= List of automobile manufacturers =

Automobile manufacturers are companies and organizations that produce motor vehicles. Many of these companies are still in business, and many of the companies are defunct. Only companies that have articles on Wikipedia are included in this list. The list is sorted by country of origin.

== A ==
=== Algeria ===
- SNVI

=== Argentina ===
- ASA Aluminium Body
- Zanella
- Sero Electric

==== Defunct ====
- Anasagasti
- AutoLatina
- Autoar
- Crespi
- Eniak
- Hispano-Argentina
- IAVA
- IAME
- IKA
- Sevel Argentina
- SIAM Di Tella

=== Armenia ===
==== Defunct ====
- ErAZ

=== Australia ===
==== Current ====
- ACE EV Group
- BCI Bus
- Borland Racing Developments
- Bolwell
- Custom Bus
- Elfin Sports Cars
- Ford Australia
- General Motors Specialty Vehicles (GMSV)
- Minetti Sports Cars
- Nota
- P&D Coachworks
- Volgren

==== Defunct ====
- Brabham Automotive
- Ford Performance Vehicles (FPV)
- Giocattolo
- Holden

=== Austria ===
- KTM
- Magna Steyr
- Puch
- Rosenbauer
- Tushek & Spigel

==== Defunct ====
- Austro-Daimler
- Austro-Tatra
- Denzel
- Felber
- Libelle
- Lohner–Porsche
- Möve
- ÖAF (merged into MAN SE)
- Steyr
- Steyr-Daimler-Puch

=== Azerbaijan ===
- AzSamand
- Ganja Auto Plant
- Nakhchivan Automobile Plant

== B ==
=== Bangladesh ===
- BMTF

=== Belarus ===
- BelAZ
- BelGee
- Belkommunmash
- MAZ
- MoAZ
- MZKT
- Neman

=== Belgium ===
==== Current ====
- Edran
- Gillet
- Van Hool

==== Defunct ====
- Auto-Mixte
- FN
- Impéria
- Métallurgique
- Minerva
- Nagant
- Pieper

=== Bolivia ===
- Quantum Motors

=== Botswana ===
==== Defunct ====
- Motor Company of Botswana

=== Brazil ===
==== Current ====
- Agrale
- Chamonix NG Cars
- Grupo Caoa
- Comil
- Carbuss
- Marcopolo
- Mascarello
- Neobus
- TAC
- Volkswagen Truck & Bus

==== Defunct ====
- Brasinca
- BusscarНсВР
- Dacon
- Engesa
- FNM
- Farus
- Gurgel
- HTT
- Hofstetter
- JPX
- Lobini
- Obvio!
- Puma
- Romi
- Santa Matilde
- Troller
- Vemag

=== Bulgaria ===
==== Current ====
- Litex
- SIN

==== Defunct ====
- Bulgaralpine
- Bulgarrenault
- Moskvych
- Pirin-Fiat
- Sofia

== C ==
=== Canada ===
==== Current ====
- Campagna
- canEV
- Edison Motors
- Conquest
- Felino
- Girardin Minibus
- GreenPower
- Intermeccanica
- INKAS
- Lion Electric
- Magnum Cars
- New Flyer
- Nova Bus
- Potential Motors
- Prevost
- Roshel
- Terradyne
- Vicinity

==== Defunct ====
- Acadian
- Asüna
- Beaumont
- Bricklin
- Dennis
- Derby
- Dupont
- Dynasty
- Envoy
- Frontenac
- Gray-Dort
- Hayes Trucks
- Manic
- McLaughlin
- Meteor
- Monarch
- Orion
- Pacific Trucks
- Passport
- Redpath
- Russell
- Studebaker
- ZENN

=== China ===
==== Current ====
- Arcfox
- Avatr
- Aion
- Apex Motors
- BAIC
- Baojun
- BAW
- Bestune
- Bisu Auto
- Brilliance
- BYD
- Changan
- Chery
- CNHTC
- Dayun
- Deepal
- Denza
- Dongfeng
- EuAuto
- Exeed
- FAW
- Fangchengbao
- Forthing
- Foton
- GAC Group
- Geely
- Great Wall
- Hafei
- Haima
- Haval
- Higer
- Hongqi
- Huajing
- iCar/iCaur
- IM Motors
- JAC Motors
- Jaecoo
- Jetour
- Jiangling
- Jinbei
- Jonway
- Joylong
- Kaiyi
- Karry
- King Long
- Leapmotor
- Li Auto
- Maxus
- M-Hero
- Neta
- Nio
- Ora
- Omoda
- Roewe
- Rox Motor
- SAIC
- Sehol
- Seres Auto
- Shacman
- Soueast
- Tank
- Trumpchi
- Venucia
- Voyah
- Wey
- Wuling
- Xiaomi
- Xiamen Golden Dragon Bus
- XPeng
- Yudo Auto
- Yutong
- Yangwang
- Zhongtong Bus
- Zotye
- ZX Auto
- Zeekr
- 212

==== Defunct ====
- Changhe
- Dadi Auto
- Emgrand
- Englon
- Everus
- Gonow
- Hafei
- Heibao
- Hanteng
- Hawtai
- Landwind
- Leahead
- Lifan
- Qoros
- Ranz
- Rising Auto
- Zinoro

=== Croatia ===
- DOK-ING
- Rimac

=== Czech Republic ===
==== Current ====
- Škoda
- Tatra
- Avia
- Kaipan
- MTX
- Praga

==== Defunct ====
- Aero
- Jawa
- LIAZ
- Velorex
- Walter Fiat

== D ==
=== Denmark ===
- Zenvo

== E ==
=== Egypt ===
- El Nasr Automotive Manufacturing Company
- Egyptian German Automotive Company
- the Ghabbour Group (MCV Egypt - Manufacturing Commercial Vehicles - MCV Bus & Coach - GB Auto)
- Speranza Motors

=== Ethiopia ===
- Marathon Motors Engineering
- Holland Car (defunct)

== F ==
=== Finland ===
- Valmet Automotive
- Electric Raceabout
- Sisu Auto

=== France ===
==== Current ====
- Aixam
- Alpine
- Auverland
- Bolloré
- Bugatti
- Citroën
- Delage
- DS
- Exagon
- Ligier
- Microcar
- Méga
- Peugeot
- PGO
- Renault
- Renault Trucks
- Venturi

==== Defunct ====
- Avions Voisin
- Berliet
- Chenard-Walcker
- Darracq
- Decauville
- De Dion-Bouton
- Delahaye
- Delaunay-Belleville
- Facel Vega
- Helicron
- Hommell
- Hotchkiss
- Lorraine-Dietrich
- Mathis
- Matra
- Mors
- Panhard
- Rochet-Schneider
- Salmson
- Simca
- Talbot
- Talbot-Lago

== G ==
=== Germany ===
==== Current ====
- Alpina
- Apollo
- Artega
- Audi
- Bitter
- BMW
- Daimler Truck
- Isdera
- Lotec
- Maybach
- Mercedes-Benz
- Multicar
- Neoplan
- Opel
- Ruf
- Porsche
- Setra
- Smart
- Volkswagen
- Volkswagen Commercial Vehicles
- Wiesmann

==== Defunct ====
- Adler
- AGA
- Auto Union
- AWS
- AWZ
- Barkas
- Borgward
- Brennabor
- Büssing
- Dauer
- DKW
- Glas
- Goliath
- Gumpert
- Hanomag
- Hansa
- Heinkel
- Horch
- Karmann
- Lloyd
- Maurer-Union
- Maybach
- Melkus
- Messerschmitt
- MAN
- NAG
- NSU
- Robur
- Simson
- Stoewer
- Tempo
- Trabant
- Wanderer
- Wartburg
- Zundapp

=== Guatemala ===
- Rosmo

=== Ghana ===
- Kantanka

=== Greece ===
==== Current ====
- ELVO
- Korres
- Namco
- Replicar Hellas
- Kioleides
- Keraboss
- Temax

==== Defunct ====
- Alta
- Attica
- Autokinitoviomihania Ellados
- Automeccanica
- Balkania
- BET
- Biamax
- BIOMAN
- DIM
- MAVA-Renault
- MEBEA
- Neorion
- Pan-Car
- Theologou

== H ==
=== Hungary ===
==== Current ====
- Credo
- Ikarus
- Rába

==== Defunct ====
- Csepel Automobile Factory
- Csonka
- Puli

== I ==
=== India ===
==== Current ====
- Ajanta Group
- Ashok Leyland
- Asia MotorWorks
- Atul Auto
- AVANI
- Bajaj
- Eicher
- Force
- Hero Motocop
- Hradyesh
- KAL
- Mahindra
- Maruti Suzuki
- Omega Seiki Mobility
- SML Isuzu
- Tara International
- Tata
- TVS

==== Defunct ====
- Chinkara
- Ideal Jawa
- Kinetic Engineering Limited
- Lohia Machinery
- Mopeds India Limited
- Premier
- Sipani
- Standard
- Hindustan Motors

=== Ireland ===
==== Defunct ====
- TMC
- Alesbury
- Shamrock (car)

=== Indonesia ===
==== Current ====
- Esemka
- Fin Komodo Teknologi
- Gaya Motor (Astra International)
- Pindad
- Polytron

==== Defunct ====
- Timor

=== Iran ===
- Azar Motor Industrial Co
- Bahman
- Diar
- Farda Motors
- Fath Vehicle Industries
- Iran Khodro
- Khodro Kaveer
- Kish Khodro
- Modiran Vehicle Manufacturing
- Morattab
- Lamari
- Pars Khodro
- SAIPA
- Zagross Khodro

=== Israel ===
==== Current ====
- Carmor
- Ha'argaz
- Merkavim
- Plasan
- REE Automotive
- Tomcar
- Zibar

==== Defunct ====
- AIL
- Autocars

=== Italy ===
==== Current ====
- Abarth
- Alfa Romeo
- Automobili Estrema
- Casalini
- Covini
- CTS
- DR Motor
- Ducati
- Ferrari
- Fiat
- Iso
- Italdesign
- Iveco
- Lamborghini
- Lancia
- Maserati
- Mazzanti
- Minardi
- Pagani
- Piaggio
- Pininfarina
- Vespa
- Zagato

==== Defunct ====
- APIS
- Ansaldo
- Aquila
- A.S.A.
- A.T.S.
- Autobianchi
- Aurea
- Bandini
- Bertone
- Bizzarrini
- Bremach
- Ceirano
- Chiribiri
- Cisitalia
- Cizeta
- De Tomaso
- Diatto
- FCA
- Fabbrica Ligure Automobili Genova (FLAG)
- Fornasari
- Innocenti
- Intermeccanica
- Iso Milano
- Isotta Fraschini
- Itala
- Junior
- Lambretta
- LMX
- Marca-Tre-Spade
- Moretti
- Nardi
- O.M.
- O.S.C.A.
- Qvale
- Scuderia Ferrari
- Rapid
- S.C.A.T.
- Siata
- S.P.A.
- Stanguellini
- Storero
- Vignale
- Volugrafo
- Zust

== J ==
=== Japan ===
==== Current ====
- Acura
- Aspark
- Autobacs Seven
- Daihatsu
- Dome
- GLM
- Hino
- Honda
- Infiniti
- Isuzu
- J-Bus
- Lexus
- Mazda
- Mitsubishi Motors
- Mitsubishi Fuso
- Mitsuoka
- NMKV
- Nissan
- Subaru
- Suzuki
- Tommykaira
- Takeoka Auto Craft
- Toyota
- UD Trucks

==== Defunct ====
- Asahi
- Autozam
- Datsun
- Eunos
- Ohta
- Otomo
- Prince

== K ==
=== Kenya ===
- Mobius Motors

== L ==
=== Latvia ===
==== Current ====
- Dartz

==== Defunct ====
- Ford-Vairogs
- RAF (Latvija)

=== Lebanon ===
- W Motors

=== Liechtenstein ===
- Orca Engineering (Defunct)
- Jehle (Defunct)

=== Luxembourg ===
- MDI

== M ==
=== Malaysia ===
- Bufori
- DefTech
- Inokom
- Modenas
- Naza
- Perodua
- Proton

=== Mexico ===
==== Current ====
- DINA
- Mastretta
- VUHL

==== Defunct ====
- Ramirez
- VAM

=== Monaco ===
- Montecarlo
- Venturi

=== Morocco ===
==== Current ====
- Neo Motors
- Laraki
- Renault Somaca

==== Defunct ====
- Fiat Somaca

=== Myanmar ===
- Shan Star

== N ==
=== Nepal ===
- Hulas Motors

=== Netherlands ===
- Burton
- Carver
- DAF
- Dakar
- Donkervoort
- Spijkstaal
- Spyker
- Stellantis (Multi-National)
- Vandenbrink
- VDL Nedcar
- Vencer

=== New Zealand ===
- Anziel
- Saker Cars
- Trekka

=== Nigeria ===
- Innoson Motors

=== North Korea ===
- Pyeonghwa Motors
- Sungri Motors
- Samhung Motors

=== Norway ===
==== Current ====
- Moxy Trucks

==== Defunct ====
- Buddy
- Think

== O ==
=== Oman ===
- MAYS

== P ==
=== Pakistan ===
==== Current ====
- Sazgar
- United Auto Industries

==== Defunct ====
- Adam Motor Company
- Dewan Farooque Motors
- Nexus Automotive

=== Philippines ===
==== Current ====
- Almazora Motors
- Del Monte Motors
- Sarao Motors

==== Defunct ====
- Delta

=== Poland ===
==== Current ====
- AMZ
- Arrinera
- Autosan
- Jelcz
- Solaris
- Ursus

==== Defunct ====
- FSC Żuk
- FSM
- FSO
- FSR Tarpan
- Intrall
- Polski Fiat
- Star
- Syrena
- Warszawa
- ZSD Nysa

=== Portugal ===
==== Current ====
- MOBIpeople
- Salvador Caetano
- Vinci

==== Defunct ====
- Bravia
- Portaro
- UMM
- Edfor
- ALBA
- Olda

== R ==
=== Romania ===
==== Current ====
- Dacia
- ROMAN

==== Defunct ====
- ARO
- Oltcit
- Rocar

=== Russia ===
==== Current ====
- Aurus
- Avtotor
- GAZ
- IZh
- Kamaz
- Lada
- LiAZ
- PAZ
- Sollers
- Tenet
- UAZ

==== Defunct ====
- Amur
- Avtoframos
- AvtoKuban
- Derways
- GAZ (Volga)
- Marussia
- Moskvitch
- Russo-Balt
- SeAZ
- SMZ
- TagAZ
- Yo-Mobile
- ZiL

== S ==
=== Saudi Arabia ===
- Ceer Motors
- KSU Gazal-1

=== Serbia ===
==== Current ====
- FAP
- FAS
- Ikarbus
- IMT

==== Defunct ====
- Neobus
- Zastava
- IDA
- Yugo

=== Slovenia ===
==== Current ====
- Adria Mobil
- Revoz
- Tushek & Spigel
- TAM-Europe

==== Defunct ====
- TAM

=== South Africa ===
==== Defunct ====
- AAD
- Perana Performance Group

=== South Korea ===
==== Current ====
- CT&T United
- Daewoo Bus
- Genesis
- GM Korea
- Gwangju Global Motors
- Hyundai
- KG Mobility
- Kia
- Renault Korea
- Tata Daewoo

==== Defunct ====
- Asia Motors
- Daewoo
- Keohwa
- Proto
- Saehan
- SsangYong
- Samsung
- Shinjin
- Sibal

=== Spain ===
- Abadal
- Aspid
- Cupra
- GTA
- Irizar
- SEAT
- Spania
- Tauro
- Tramontana
- Uro
- Hispano Suiza

=== Sri Lanka ===
- Micro
- Vega EVX

=== Sweden ===
==== Current ====
- Koenigsegg
- NEVS
- Polestar
- Scania
- Volvo Buses
- Volvo Cars
- Volvo Trucks

==== Defunct ====
- Jösse Car
- Saab
- Uniti

=== Switzerland ===
==== Current ====
- Micro Mobility Systems
- Leblanc
- Piëch Automotive
- Rinspeed
- Sbarro

==== Defunct ====
- Enzmann
- Martini
- Monteverdi
- Pic-Pic
- Soletta

== T ==
=== Taiwan ===
- CMC
- Foxtron
- Luxgen
- Yulon

=== Thailand ===
- Thai Rung

=== Tunisia ===
- Wallyscar

=== Turkey ===
==== Current ====
- BMC
- Erkunt
- Etox
- Fiat-Tofaş
- FNSS
- Guleryuz
- Karsan
- Otokar
- Özaltin
- Pancar Motor
- Temsa
- Togg

==== Defunct ====
- Anadol
- Devrim

== U ==
=== Ukraine ===
- Bohdan
- Etalon
- KrAZ
- LAZ
- ZAZ
- LuAZ (now part of Bogdan)

=== United Arab Emirates ===
- W Motors

=== United Kingdom ===
==== Current ====
- AC
- Alexander Dennis
- Apex Motors
- Ariel
- Aston Martin
- Atalanta Motors
- BAC
- Bentley
- Bowler
- Caterham
- Crosslé
- David Brown Automotive
- Elemental Cars
- Ginetta
- GKD
- GMA
- Grinnall
- Healey
- Ineos
- Jaguar
- Lagonda
- Larmar
- Land Rover
- LEVC
- Lister
- Lotus
- McLaren
- Mellor Bus
- MG
- Mini
- Modec
- Morgan
- Noble
- Radical Sportscars
- Rolls-Royce
- Ronart Cars
- TVR
- Ultima Sports
- Vauxhall
- Westfield
- Wrightbus

==== Defunct ====
- Adam's Brothers
- AEC
- Allard
- Alvis
- Austin
- Austin-Healey
- British Leyland
- Bristol
- Daimler
- Donald Healey
- Elva
- Gordon Keeble
- Hillman
- Humber
- Jensen
- Jowett
- Lanchester
- LDV
- Marcos
- Morris
- Panther Westwinds
- Reliant Motors
- Riley
- Rootes
- Rover
- Sharps Commercials Ltd
- Singer
- Standard
- Sunbeam
- Trident Cars
- Triumph
- Trojan
- Vale Motor Company
- Wolseley

=== United States ===
==== Current ====
- All American Racers
- AM General
- Anteros Coachworks
- Aptera
- Arcimoto
- Autocar
- Blue Bird
- Bremach
- BrightDrop
- Buick
- Cadillac
- Canoo
- Czinger
- Chevrolet
- Chrysler
- Chrysler (brand)
- DDR Motorsport
- Dodge
- Drako Motors
- ElDorado
- ENC
- Equus
- Falcon Motorsports
- Faraday
- Fisker
- Ford
- Freightliner
- Gillig
- GM
- GEM
- GMC
- Hennessey
- IC Bus
- Jeep
- Karma
- Kenworth
- Lincoln
- Lucid Motors
- Mack
- MCI
- Navistar
- Nikola Motor
- Oshkosh
- Panoz
- Peterbilt
- Pierce
- Polaris
- Ram
- RAESR
- Rezvani Motors
- Rivian
- Rossion
- Saleen
- SCG
- Shelby
- SSC
- Tesla
- Thomas Built Buses
- Trion Supercars
- VLF Automotive
- Western Star
- Workhorse

==== Defunct ====
- Adams-Farwell
- Alco
- AMC
- Amplex
- Apollo
- Apperson
- Aptera
- ArBenz
- Auburn
- Avanti Motor Company
- Baker Electric
- Bates
- Brush
- Cartercar
- Chalmers
- Chandler
- Chaparral Cars
- Checker
- Clénet
- Cole
- Columbia
- Continental
- Cord
- Crawford
- Crosley
- Cutting
- Daniels
- Davis
- Devon
- DeLorean
- DeSoto
- Detroit Electric
- Diamond Reo Trucks
- Doble
- Dorris
- Dort
- Duesenberg
- Durant
- Dymaxion
- Eagle
- Edsel
- Elgin
- Essex
- Excalibur
- Flint
- Frazer
- Frontenac
- FCA
- Gardner
- Geo
- Graham-Paige
- GreenTech Automotive
- Grumman
- Haynes
- Hudson
- Hummer
- Hupmobile
- Hupp-Yeats
- Imperial
- International Harvester
- Inter-State
- Jackson
- Jeffery
- Kaiser
- King
- Kissel
- Kline Kar
- Knox
- LaFayette
- Laforza
- Lambert
- LaSalle
- Lexington
- Local
- Locomobile
- Lordstown Motors
- Lozier
- Lyons-Knight
- Marmon (Cars)
- Marmon (Trucks)
- Marmon-Herrington
- Maxwell
- McFarlan
- Mercer
- Mercury
- Mitchell
- Monarch
- Monroe
- Moon
- Mosler
- Nash
- National
- Nyberg
- Oakland
- Oldsmobile
- Overland
- Packard
- Peerless
- Pierce-Arrow
- Pilot
- Plymouth
- Pontiac
- Pope-Toledo
- Pope-Tribune
- Premier
- Proterra
- Pungs Finch
- Rambler
- Rauch and Lang
- Regal
- REO
- Safari Coach
- Saturn
- Scion
- Scripps-Booth
- Simplex
- Speedwell
- Stanley
- Star
- Stearns-Knight
- Sterling
- Sterling Trucks
- Stevens-Duryea
- Stoddard-Dayton
- Stout Motor Car Company
- Studebaker
- Stutz
- TH!NK
- Thomas
- Tucker
- Vector
- VPG
- Velie
- Westcott
- White
- Willys
- Zimmer

=== Uruguay ===
- Effa

==== Defunct ====
- Sevel Uruguay

=== Uzbekistan ===
- SAZ
- GM Uzbekistan

== V ==
=== Venezuela ===
==== Current ====
- Venirauto

=== Vietnam ===
==== Current ====
- Thaco
- Mekong Auto
- VinFast

==== Defunct ====
- Vinaxuki

== See also ==
- List of Asian automobile manufacturers
- List of car brands
- List of current automobile manufacturers by country
- List of manufacturers by motor vehicle production
- List of European automobiles
- Timeline of motor vehicle brands
