= List of current automobile marques =

For other automobile manufacturing related lists, see See also

This is a list of current automobile marques arranged in alphabetical order. The list only includes marques of road-legal automobiles currently in production. The marque's year of foundation is shown in brackets.

== A ==
- AC (1901)
- ACE EV Group (2017)
- Acura (1986)
- Aeolus (2009)
- Agrale (1962)
- Aion (2017)
- Aistaland (2026)
- Aito: see Seres (2016)
- Aiways (2017)
- Aixam (1983)
- Alfa Romeo (1910)
- Almac (1985)
- Apex Motors (2018)
- Alpha (2020)
- Alpina (1965)
- Alpine (1955)
- Alternative Cars (1984)
- Amberavto (1996)
- AM General (1954)
- Anteros (2005)
- Apex (2018)
- Apollo (2004)
- Aptera (2005)
- Arash (2006)
- Arcimoto (2007)
- Arcfox (2017)
- Arctic Trucks (1990)
- Ariel (2001)
- Arrinera (2008)
- Aspark (2005)
- Aspid (2003)
- Aston Martin (1913)
- Atalanta (2011)
- Audi (1932)
- AUDI (2024)
- Automobili Estrema (2020)
- Auverland (1980)

== B ==
- BAC (2009)
- Bahman (1953)
- BAIC (1988)
- Bajaj (1930s)
- Baojun (2010)
- Baltasar Cars (2011)
- BAW (1953)
- Beijing: see BAIC (2013)
- Bentley (1919)
- Bestune (2006)
- Bowler (1985)
- BJEV: see BAIC (2013)
- BMC (1963)
- BMW (1916)
- Bollinger (2014)
- Bolloré (1822)
- Bolwell (1962/2008)
- Brilliance (1992)
- Bufori (1986)
- Bugatti (1909)
- Buick (1903)
- BYD (2003)

== C ==
- Cadillac (1902)
- Callaway (1977)
- Caresto (1996)
- Carver (1994)
- Caterham (1973)
- Ceer Motors (2022)
- Century (2025)
- Chamonix (1987)
- Chang'an (1862)
- Chery (1997)
- Chevrolet (1911)
- Chirey: see Chery (2022)
- Chrysler (1925)
- Cirelli: see SWM (2018)
- Citroën (1919)
- Ciwei (2018)
- CMC (1969)
- Comarth (1999)
- Cupra (1985/2018)
- Czinger (2019)

== D ==
- Dacia (1966)
- Daihatsu (1951)
- Dakar 4x4 (1991)
- David Brown (2013)
- Dax (1968)
- Dayun (1987)
- DDR Motorsport (2001)
- De la Chapelle (1970s)
- De Tomaso (1959)
- Delage (1905/2019)
- DeLorean (1975)
- Denza (2010)
- Detroit Electric (1907)
- DFSK (2003)
- Diar (2000)
- Dodge (1900)
- Dongfeng (1969)
- Donkervoort (1978)
- Drako Motors (2013)
- DR (2006)
- DS (2015)
- Dynasty (1998)

== E ==
- Ebro (1954/2023)
- EdisonFuture (2020)
- Edran (1984)
- Electric Raceabout (2009)
- Elemental (2012)
- Elaris (2020)
- Elfin (1957)
- Elio (2009)
- Elva (1955)
- EMC: see Kaiyi (2022)
- Englon (2010)
- Enranger: see Weichai (2013)
- Epicland (2026)
- Equus (2009)
- Esemka (2007)
- Etox (2006)
- EVEasy (2018)
- Everus (2008)
- EVO: see DR (2020)
- Exeed (2017)

== F ==
- Factory Five Racing (1995)
- Falcon Motorsports (2009)
- Fangchengbao (2023)
- Faraday Future (2014)
- Fath Vehicle Industries (1995)
- FAW (1953)
- Fengon: see DFSK (2014)
- Ferrari (1939)
- Felino Corporation (2009)
- Fiat (1899)
- Fiat Professional (2007)
- Firefly (2024)
- FMC (2013)
- Foday (1988)
- Force (1958)
- Ford (1903)
- Forthing (2001)
- Foton (1996)
- Foxtron (2020)
- Fownix: see MVM (2002)
- Fraser (1988)
- Freelander (2024)

== G ==
- GAC (1955)
- GAZ (1932)
- Geely (1986)
- Geely Galaxy (2023)
- GEM (1992)
- Genesis (2015)
- Gibbs (2012)
- Gillet (1992)
- GKD (2006)
- Ginetta (1958)
- Glickenhaus (2004)
- GMC (1911)
- GMA (2017)
- Great Wall (1984)
- Grinnall (1990)
- GTA (2005)
- Gyon (2018)

== H ==
- Haval (2013)
- Hawtai (2000)
- Hengchi (2020)
- Henrey (2010)
- Hispano Suiza (1904)
- Honda (1946)
- Hongqi (1958)
- Hopium (2019)
- Hozon (2014)
- Huajing (2026)
- Hulas Motors (1996)
- Hurtan (1991)
- Hyptec (2022)
- Hyundai (1967)
- Hennessey (1991)

== I ==
- ICH-X: see DR (2022)
- IKCO (1962)
- IM (2020)
- Ineos (2017)
- Infiniti (1989)
- Intermeccanica (1959)
- Ioniq (2020)
- Isdera (1969)
- Iso (1938)
- Isuzu (1916)
- Iveco Bus (1975)
- IVM (2007)

== J ==
- JAC (1964)
- Jaecoo (2022)
- Jaguar (1922)
- Jeep (1941)
- Jetour (2018)
- Jetta (2019)
- Jinbei (1991)
- JMC (1993)
- JMEV (2015)
- Jonway (2005)
- Joylong (2007)
- JY (2023)

== K ==
- Karsan (1966)
- Kaipan (1991)
- Kaiyi (2014)
- Kandi (2002)
- Kantanka (1994)
- Karma (2014)
- Karry (2009)
- Keyton (2016)
- Keraboss
- KGM (1954)
- Kia (1944)
- Kiira (aka KMC) (2014)
- Koenigsegg (1994)
- Korres Engineering (2002)
- KTM (1992)

== L ==
- Lada (1966)
- Lamborghini (1963)
- Lancia (1906)
- Land Rover (1948)
- Laraki (1999)
- Leapmotor (2015)
- Leblanc
- Lepas (2025)
- LEVC (2013)
- Lexus (1989)
- Li Auto (2015)
- Lifan (1992)
- Ligier (1968)
- Lincoln (1917)
- Linghui (2026)
- Lingxi (2023)
- Lister (1954)
- Livan (2020)
- Lobini (1999)
- Lojo: see Xiaohu
- Lotus (1952)
- Lucid (2007)
- Luxeed (2023)
- Luxgen (2009)
- Lynk & Co (2016)

== M ==
- Maextro (2024)
- Mahindra (1945)
- Maruti Suzuki (1981)
- Maserati (1914)
- Maxus (2011)
- Mazda (1920)
- McLaren (1989)
- Mega (1989)
- Melex (1971)
- Mercedes-AMG (1967)
- Mercedes-Benz (1926)
- Mercedes-Maybach (1909)
- MG (1924)
- Micro (1995)
- Micro Mobility Systems (1996)
- Mini (1969)
- Mitsubishi (1870)
- Mitsuoka (1968)
- Mobius (2010)
- Morgan (1910)
- Moskvitch (1946/2022)
- MVM (2002)
- Mullen (2014)
- Munro Vehicles (2019)
- Myers EV (1996)
- Marussia (2007)

== N ==
- Navya SAS (2014)
- Neo Motors (2018)
- Nio (2014)
- Nissan (1933)
- Noble (1999)

== O ==
- Omoda (2022)
- Onvo (2024)
- Opel (1862)
- Ora (2018)
- Oreva (1971)

== P ==
- Pagani (1992)
- PGO (1985)
- PAL-V (2001)
- Panoz (1989)
- Pars Khodro (1967)
- Perodua (1993)
- Peugeot (1889)
- Piëch Automotive (2017)
- Phoenix Motorcars (2002)
- Pininfarina (2018)
- Polaris (1954)
- Polestar (1996/2017)
- Porsche (1931)
- Praga (1907)
- Proton (1983)

== Q ==
- Quantum Motors (2017)

== R ==
- Radical (1997)
- Ram (2010)
- Renault (1899)
- Rimac (2009)
- Rinspeed (1979)
- Rivian (2009)
- Rezvani (2014)
- Rinco: see Xiaohu (2022)
- Roding (2008)
- Roewe (2006)
- Rolls-Royce (1906)
- RONN (2007)
- Ruf (1939)
- Ruixiang: see Yinxiang (2021)

== S ==
- SAIC (2025)
- SAIPA (1966)
- Saker (1989)
- Saleen (1983)
- Sbarro (1971)
- SEAT (1950)
- SECMA (1995)
- Sehol (2018)
- Seres (2016)
- Sero Electric (2010)
- Shan Star
- Shelby (1962)
- SIN (2012)
- Sinogold (2016)
- Škoda (1895)
- Skyworth (2017)
- Slate Auto (2022)
- Smart (1994)
- Sono (2016)
- Soueast (1995)
- Sportequipe: see DR (2022)
- Spyker (1999)
- SSC (1999)
- Stelato (2024)
- Subaru (1953)
- Superformance (1996)
- Suzuki (1909)
- SWM (2014)

== T ==
- Takeoka (1982)
- TAC (2004)
- Tata (1945)
- Tauro Sport Auto (2010)
- Techrules (2015)
- Telo Trucks (2022)
- Tesla (2003)
- Thai Rung (1967)
- Thunder Power (2011)
- Tiger Truck (1989)
- Tiger: see DR (2024)
- TOGG (2018)
- Toyota (1937)
- Tramontana (2007)
- Trion (2012)
- Trumpchi (2010)
- Tushek&Spigel (2012)
- TVR (1947)

== U ==
- UAZ (1941)
- Ultima (1992)

== V ==
- Vandenbrink (2006)
- Vanderhall (2010)
- Vauxhall (1857)
- Vega (2013)
- Vencer (2010)
- Venucia (2010)
- VGV: see Weichai (2019)
- VinFast (2017)
- VLF (1965)
- Volkswagen (1937)
- Volvo (1927)
- Voyah (2020)
- VUHL (2010)

== W ==
- W Motors (2012)
- Wallyscar (2007)
- WaterCar (1999)
- Weiwang: see Yinxiang (2011)
- Weltmeister (2015)
- Westfield (1982)
- Wey (2016)
- Wheego (2009)
- Wiesmann (1988)
- Wuling (2002)

== X ==
- XEV (2016)
- Xiaohu (2021)
- Xiaomi (2021)
- Xos (2016)
- XPeng (2014)
- Xtrim: see MVM (2021)

== Y ==
- Yangwang (2023)
- Youxia (2014)
- Yuanhang: see Dayun (2022)
- Yudo (2017)
- Yulon (1953)

== Z ==
- Zacua (2017)
- Zamyad (1963)
- ZAZ (1932)
- Zeekr (2021)
- Zenos Cars (2012)
- Zenvo (2004)
- Zotye (2003)
- ZX (aka Zhongxing) (1999)

== Alliances ==
- COVESA (2009)
- Open Automotive Alliance (2014)
- Renault-Nissan-Mitsubishi Alliance (1999)
- Stellantis (2021)

== Automotive design & coachbuilding ==
- Castagna (1849)
- CTS (1926)
- Dallara (1972)
- Fisher Body (1908)
- Ghia (1916)
- Italdesign Giugiaro (1968)
- MOMO (1964)
- Rometsch (1924)
- Tatuus (1980)
- Vandenbrink (2006)
- Zagato (1919)

== Automotive parts suppliers ==
- AC Propulsion (1992)
- Automotive Lighting (1999)
- BBS (1970)
- Bilstein (1873)
- Bosch (1886)
- Comau (1973)
- Dinan (1979)
- Delco (1909)
- Factory Five (1995)
- Hoesch (1871)
- HKS (1973)
- Impul (1980)
- Intrepid (1991)
- Locust
- Loremo (2000)
- Magna (1957)
- Magneti Marelli (1919)
- Mazel(1987)
- Mecachrome (1937)
- Mopar (1937)
- Motrio (1998)
- Multimatic (1984)
- nanoFlowcell (2013)
- Napier (1990)
- Novitec (1989)
- Paxton (1937)
- Rieter (1795)
- ThyssenKrupp (1999)
- VDL (1953)
- VeilSide (1990)
- Weber (1923)

== Contract manufacturers & Manufacturing subsidiaries ==
- EDAG (1969)
- Kuozui Motors (1984)
- Magna (1957)
- Magna Steyr (2001)
- MCA (1969)
- Mopar (1937)
- Motrio (1998)
- Valmet (1968)
- VDL (1953)
- VDL Nedcar (1967)

== Fleet Management Companies ==
- ALD (1946)

== Tuning marques ==
- 9ff (2001)
- Abarth(1949)
- Abt Sportsline (1896)
- AC Schnitzer (1987)
- Autech (1986)
- Bitter Automotive (1971)
- Brabus (1977)
- Carlsson (1989)
- Carly (1979)
- Eibach (1951)
- Galpin (1946)
- Gemballa (1981)
- Gordini (1946)
- G-Power (1971)
- Gazoo Racing (2007)
- HPD (1993)
- HSV (2017)
- Holden Special Vehicles (1987)
- Kleemann (1985)
- Koenig (1977)
- Lingenfelter (1973)
- Mansory (1989)
- MTM (1990)
- Mugen (1973)
- Pratt & Miller (1989)
- Prodrive (1984)
- Ralliart (1984)
- RE Amemiya (1974)
- Renntech (1989)
- Roush Performance (1995)
- RTR Vehicles (1999)
- Sauber (1970)
- Spiess (1972)
- Steinmetz (1993)
- STILLEN (1986)
- Studie (1995)
- TechArt (1987)
- TRD (1954)
- WCC (1994)

== See also ==
- List of automobile manufacturers
- List of automobile marques
- List of current automobile manufacturers by country
- Timeline of motor vehicle brands
- Automotive industry in the United Kingdom
- List of car manufacturers of the United Kingdom
- List of Asian automobile manufacturers
- List of Eastern European automobiles
- List of Western European automobile manufacturers
