= List of current automobile manufacturers by country =

This is a list of notable current automobile manufacturers including buses & trucks manufacturers but excluding agricultural, construction, military & motorcycle vehicles with articles on Wikipedia by region.

== A ==
=== Algeria ===
- SNVI

=== Argentina ===
- ASA Aluminium Body
- Zanella
- Sero Electric

=== Australia ===
- ACE EV Group
- BCI Bus
- Borland Racing
- Bolwell
- Custom Bus
- Elfin Sports Cars
- Minetti Sports Cars
- Nota
- P&D Coachworks
- Volgren

=== Austria ===
- KTM - (sports car only)
- Magna Steyr
- Rosenbauer
- Tushek & Spigel

=== Azerbaijan ===
- AzSamand
- Ganja Auto Plant
- Nakhchivan Automobile Plant

== B ==
=== Belarus ===
- BelAZ
- BelGee
- Belkommunmash
- MAZ
- MoAZ
- MZKT
- Neman

=== Belgium ===
- Edran
- Gillet
- Van Hool

=== Bolivia ===
- Quantum Motors

=== Brazil ===
- Agrale
- Comil
- Grupo Caoa
- Chamonix NG Cars
- Carbuss
- Marcopolo
- Mascarello
- Neobus
- Puma
- TAC

=== Bulgaria ===
- Litex
- SIN

== C ==
=== Canada ===
- Bombardier
- Campagna
- Edison Motors
- Felino Corporation
- Intermeccanica
- INKAS
- Lion Electric Company
- Magnum Cars
- New Flyer
- Nova Bus
- Prevost
- Terradyne
- Vicinity Motor Corp.

=== China ===
- Arcfox
- Aion
- Apex Motors
- Ankai
- BAIC
- Bonluck
- Baojun
- BAW
- Bestune
- Brilliance
- BYD
- Changan
- Changhe
- Chery
- Dongfeng
- Denza
- Englon
- Exeed
- EuAuto
- Everus
- FAW
- Hongqi
- Foton
- Firefly
- Fangchengbao
- GAC
- Geely
- Great Wall
- Gyon
- Henrey Automobile
- Hafei
- Haima
- Hanteng
- Hawtai
- Haval
- Heibao
- HiPhi
- Higer
- Hozon Auto
- Huajing
- Jetour
- Jiangling
- JMEV
- Jinbei
- Jonway
- JAC
- Jetta
- JuneYao Auto
- Karry
- Kandi
- King Long
- ORA
- Landwind
- Leahead
- Li Auto
- Leapmotor
- Lynk&Co
- Maextro
- Mudan Auto
- Maxus
- Nio
- Qoros
- Roewe
- Ranz
- SAIC
- Sehol
- Soueast
- Spotlight Automotive
- Stelato
- Sunlong Bus
- Skyworth Auto
- Trumpchi
- Wuling
- Voyah
- Xpeng
- Xiaomi Auto
- Yudo Auto
- Yutong
- Zhongtong Bus
- Zinoro
- Zotye
- Zeekr
- WEY
- Xiamen Golden Dragon Bus
- Yangwang
- ZX Auto

=== Colombia ===
- Busscar de Colombia
- Sofasa

=== Croatia ===
- DOK-ING
- Rimac

=== Czech Republic ===
- Škoda
- Tatra
- Avia
- Kaipan
- MTX
- Praga

== D ==
=== Denmark ===
- Hydrema
- Zenvo

== E ==
=== Ecuador ===
- Aymesa

=== Egypt ===
- MCV Bus & Coach

=== Ethiopia ===
- Marathon Motors Engineering

== F ==
=== Finland ===
- Valmet Automotive
- Electric Raceabout
- Sisu Auto

=== France ===
- Aixam
- Alpine
- Auverland
- Bolloré
- Bugatti
- Citroën
- Delage
- De La Chapelle
- DS
- Exagon
- Heuliez Bus
- Hopium
- Ligier
- Microcar
- Méga
- Navya SAS
- Peugeot
- PGO
- Power Vehicle Innovation
- Renault
- Renault Trucks
- SECMA
- Venturi

== G ==
=== Georgia ===
- KAZ

=== Germany ===
==== German Big Three ====
- BMW
  - Alpina
  - BMW
  - BMW I
  - BMW M
- Mercedes-Benz
  - Daimler Truck
  - Mercedes-Benz
  - Setra
  - Smart
- Volkswagen
  - Audi
  - MAN
  - Porsche
  - Volkswagen

==== Others ====
- Apollo
- Artega
- Bitter
- Elaris
- e.GO Mobile
- Isdera
- Lotec
- Multicar
- Neoplan
- Opel
- Ruf
- Sono
- Wiesmann

=== Guatemala ===
- Rosmo

=== Ghana ===
- Kantanka

=== Greece ===
- ELVO
- Keraboss
- Kioleides
- Korres
- Namco
- Replicar Hellas
- Temax

== H ==
=== Hungary ===
- Ikarus
- Rába

== I ==
=== Iceland ===
- Arctic Trucks

=== India ===
- Ather electric
- Ajanta Group
- Ashok Leyland
- Asia MotorWorks
- Atul Auto
- Bajaj
- Eicher
- Force
- ICML motors
- KAL
- Mahindra
- Maruti
- Ola Electric
- Omega Seiki Mobility
- Tara International
- Tata Motors
- Tata Motors Passenger Vehicles

=== Indonesia ===
- Astra International
- Esemka
- Indomobil Group
- Pindad

=== Iran ===
- Azar Motor Industrial Co
- Bahman
- Diar
- Fath Vehicle Industries
- Iran Khodro
- Khodro Kaveer
- MVM
- Morattab
- SAIPA
- Zagross Khodro

=== Israel ===
- Autocars Co.
- Automotive Industries Ltd.
- City Transformer
- Ha'argaz
- Merkavim
- Plasan
- REE Automotive
- Tomcar
- Zibar

=== Italy ===
- Abarth
- Alkè
- Astra
- Alfa Romeo
- Automobili Estrema
- Bremach
- Casalini
- Covini
- CTS
- DR Motor
- Dallara
- Fiat
- Ferrari
- Iso
- Italdesign
- Iveco
- Lancia
- Lamborghini
- Maserati
- M.A.T
- Mazzanti
- Minardi
- Pagani
- Piaggio
- Pininfarina
- SCV Srl
- XEV
- Zagato

== J ==
=== Japan ===
==== Major ====
- Acura
- Daihatsu
- Hino
- Honda
- Infiniti
- Isuzu
- Lexus
- Mazda
- Mitsubishi
- Mitsubishi Fuso
- Nissan
- Subaru
- Suzuki
- Toyota
- UD Trucks

==== Minor ====
- Aspark
- Dome
- GLM
- J-Bus
- Mitsuoka
- NMKV
- Tommykaira

== K ==
=== Kenya ===
- Cooper Motor Corporation
- Mobius Motors

== L ==
=== Latvia ===
- Dartz
- Drive eO

=== Lebanon ===
- EV Electra
- W Motors

=== Luxembourg ===
- MDI

== M ==
=== Malaysia ===
- Bufori
- DefTech
- Inokom
- Naza
- Perodua
- Proton

=== Mexico ===
- DINA
- Mastretta
- VUHL
- Zacua

=== Monaco ===
- Venturi

=== Morocco ===
- Laraki
- Neo Motors
- Somaca

=== Myanmar ===
- Shan Star

== N ==
=== Nepal ===
- Hulas Motors

=== Netherlands ===
- Burton
- Carver
- DAF
- Dakar
- Donkervoort
- Spijkstaal
- Spyker
- Stellantis (Multi-National)
- Vandenbrink
- VDL Bus & Coach
- Vencer

=== New Zealand ===
- Almac
- Anziel
- Kiwi Bus Builders
- Saker Cars
- Trekka

=== Nigeria ===
- Innoson Motors

=== North Korea ===
- Pyeonghwa Motors
- Sungri Motors
- Samhung Motors

=== North Macedonia ===
- FAS Sanos

== P ==
=== Pakistan ===
- Dewan Farooque Motors
- Sazgar

=== Philippines ===
- Almazora Motors
- Francisco Motors
- Del Monte Motors
- Sarao Motors

=== Poland ===
- AMZ
- Arrinera
- Autosan
- FSO Syrena in Kutno
- Jelcz
- Melex
- Solaris
- Solbus
- Ursus

=== Portugal ===
- MOBIpeople
- Salvador Caetano
- Vinci

== R ==
=== Romania ===
- Dacia
- Astra Bus
- C&I Eurotrans XXI
- El Car
- Grivița
- ROMAN

=== Russia ===
- Aurus
- Avtotor
- AvtoVAZ
- GAZ
  - KAvZ
  - LiAZ
  - PAZ
- KAMAZ
  - NefAZ
- Kombat Armouring
- Moskvich
- Sollers
  - UAZ
- TREKOL
- UralAZ
- Volgabus

== S ==
=== Saudi Arabia ===
- KSU Gazal-1
- Ceer Motors

=== Serbia ===
- FAP
- FAS
- Ikarbus
- IMT

=== Slovenia ===
- Adria Mobil
- Revoz
- TAM-Europe

=== South Africa ===
- Advanced Automotive Design
- Perana Performance Group

=== South Korea ===
- CT&T United
- Daewoo Bus
- Genesis
- Gwangju Global
- Hyundai
- KGM Commercial
- Kia
- Renault Korea
- Spirra
- SsangYong
- Tata Daewoo
- Woojin Industrial Systems

=== Spain ===
- Aspid
- Ayats
- Beulas
- Baltasar Cars
- Carrocera Castrosua
- Cupra
- Comarth
- GTA
- Hispano-Suiza
- Hurtan
- Irizar
- Sunsundegui
- SEAT
- Spania
- Tauro
- Tramontana
- Uro

=== Sri Lanka ===
- Micro Cars

=== Sudan ===
- Giad Auto

=== Sweden ===
- Caresto
- Koenigsegg
- Polestar
- Scania
- Volvo

=== Switzerland ===
- Micro Mobility Systems
- Leblanc
- Piëch Automotive
- Rinspeed
- Sbarro

== T ==
=== Taiwan ===
- CMC
- Hotai Motors
- Foxtron
- Kuozui Motors
- Luxgen
- Thunder Power
- Yulon

=== Thailand ===
- Bangchan
- Thai Rung

=== Tunisia ===
- Wallyscar

=== Turkey ===
- BMC
- Erkunt
- Etox
- Guleryuz
- Karsan
- Katmerciler
- Otokar
- Ozaltin
- Temsa
- Tofas
- Togg

== U ==
=== Ukraine ===
- Bogdan Corporation
- Etalon
  - Boryspil Bus Factory
  - Chernihiv Bus Factory
- Eurocar
- KrAZ
- Sherp
- ZAZ

=== United Arab Emirates ===
- NIMR
- STREIT Group
- W Motors

=== United Kingdom ===
- AC
- Alexander Dennis
- Apex
- Ariel
- Aston Martin
- Atalanta
- BAC
- Bentley
- Bowler
- Caterham
- David Brown
- Elemental Cars
- Ginetta
- Gordon Murray Automotive
- GKD Sports
- Grinnall
- Ineos
- Jaguar
- Lagonda
- London EV Company
- Land Rover
- Lister
- Lotus
- Munro Vehicles
- McLaren
- Mellor Bus
- MG
- Mini
- Morgan
- Noble
- Radical Sportscars
- Rolls-Royce
- Ronart
- Switch Mobility
- TVR
- Ultima Sports
- Vauxhall

=== United States ===
==== Big Three ====
Hummer is part of General Motors

- General Motors
  - Buick
  - Cadillac
  - Chevrolet
  - GMC
- Stellantis
  - Chrysler
  - Dodge
  - Jeep
  - Ram
- Ford
  - Ford
  - Lincoln

==== Others ====
- All American Racers
- AM General
- Anteros Coachworks
- Aptera
- Arcimoto
- Autocar
- Alpha
- Bremach
- Bollinger
- Callaway
- Canoo
- Czinger
- DDR Motorsport
- DeLorean
- Drako
- Detroit Electric
- E-Z-GO
- Equus
- EdisonFuture
- Falcon Motorsports
- Factory Five Racing
- Faraday
- Fisker
- Freightliner
- Gillig
- Google
- GEM
- Hennessey
- Harley Davidson
- International Harvester
- IC Bus
- Karma
- Kenworth
- Lingenfelter Performance Engineering
- Lordstown
- Lucid
- Mullen
- Mack
- Myers
- MCI
- Navistar
- Nikola
- Oshkosh
- Panoz
- Phoenix Motorcars
- Peterbilt
- Pierce
- Polaris
- Proterra
- RAESR
- Rezvani
- Rivian
- Ronn Motor Group
- Rossion
- Saleen
- SCG
- Scout
- Shelby
- Slate Auto
- SRT
- SSC
- Thomas Built Buses
- Tesla
- Telo Trucks
- Trion Supercars
- VLF
- Vanderhall Motor Works
- Western Star
- Workhorse
- Xos, Inc.

=== Uruguay ===
- Effa

=== Uzbekistan ===
- MAN Auto-Uzbekistan
- UzAuto Motors
- SAZ

== V ==
=== Venezuela ===
- Venirauto

=== Vietnam ===
- Mekong
- SAMCO
- THACO
- VinFast

== Z ==
=== Zimbabwe ===
- Willowvale Motor Industries

== See also ==
- List of motorcycle manufacturers
- List of car brands
- List of Asian automobile manufacturers
- List of European automobiles
- List of manufacturers by motor vehicle production
- Timeline of motor vehicle brands
