= List of automobile manufacturers of Canada =

This is a list of notable automobile manufacturers with articles on Wikipedia by country. It is a subset of the list of automobile manufacturers for manufacturers based in Canada. It includes companies that are in business as well as defunct manufacturers.

== Manufacturers ==
- Campagna (1988)
- Canadian Electric Vehicles (1996)
- Conquest (2008)
- Edison Motors (2021)
- Fiat Chrysler Canada (1925)
- Ford Canada (1904)
- General Motors Canada (1918)
  - CAMI (1986)
- GreenPower (2007)
- Girardin Minibus (1935)
- Honda Canada (1969)
- HTT Automobile (2007)
- Lion Bus (2011)
- Magnum Cars (1968)
- New Flyer (1930)
- Nova Bus (1993)
- Potential Motors (2018)
- Prevost (1924)
- Roshel (2016)
- Terradyne Armored Vehicles Inc. (2006)
- Timmis (1968)
- Toyota Canada (1964)
- Vicinity Motor Corp. (2008)
- ZENN Motor Company (2006–2010) | (Originally founded as Feel Good Cars in 2001)

== See also ==
- List of automobile manufacturers
- List of automobile marques
