= California Automobile Company =

American automobile manufacturer (1900–1902)

- Company type: Private
- Industry: Automotive industry
- Founded: 1900
- Defunct: 1902
- Fate: Destroyed by fire
- Headquarters: San Francisco, California, U.S.
- Products: Automobiles (gasoline, electric, steam)

The California was an automobile company located in San Francisco, California, from 1900–1902. It promised prices 100–300 dollars less than other auto companies.

== History ==
The California Automobile Company was established in 1900, during the earliest years of automobile manufacturing on the West Coast. The company marketed itself as offering prices $100 to $300 less than competing automobile manufacturers, and emphasized the advantage of being a local producer. In a 1902 advertisement, the company stated: "Our factory, where your machine is made, is at your disposal for any repairs or breakage. These can be attended to without the troublesome delays necessarily encountered when dealing with Eastern firms."

=== Closure ===
On May 12, 1902, a fire destroyed the company's factory along with all of its machinery, bringing the enterprise to an abrupt end.

A separate, unrelated company also called the California Automobile Company was later established in Los Angeles in 1909, when it acquired the Auto Vehicle Company.

== Models ==
The California's main car was a runabout that ranged in price from $500–$3,000. It was tiller driven, and had an air-cooled, gasoline engine. The company also had electric and steam engines.

== See also ==
- List of automobile manufacturers
- Brass Era car
- History of the automobile
