= BIOMAN (lifting devices) =

Greek machine manufacturer

BIOMAN Tiger IIa dumper (1500 kg)

BIOMAN Tiger IIc heavy forklift (1000 kg)

BIOMAN is a Greek machine manufacturer, based in Koropi, near Athens. It was founded in 1967 and has focused on design and construction of a wide variety of lifting devices/material handling equipment (hydraulic and electric, platforms, lifts, forklifts, dumpers etc.). Its early products included the Tiger family of vehicles, consisting of light and heavy dumpers and forklifts (no longer produced).

== See also ==
- List of automobile manufacturers
- List of car brands
