= Hradyesh =

Indian automobile manufacturer

Hraadyesh
- Type: Private
- Industry: Luxury; Manufacturing; Distribution
- Founded: 2011; 15 years ago
- Founder: Hraadyesh Kumar Namdeo
- Headquarters: New Delhi, India
- Area served: Worldwide
- Key people: Hraadyesh Kumar Namdeo (CEO)
- Products: Luxury cars
- Services: Masterpiece and Luxury Automobiles
- Website: hradyesh.com

Hradyesh is an automobile manufacturing company based in India, specialising in custom made luxury cars.

Their "masterpiece edition" car Morris Street was launched in 2011. The company claimed that it was the most expensive luxury car built by an Indian car company.
