= Edfor =

Portuguese car manufacturer

Edfor was an automobile brand created by Eduardo Ferreirinha in Porto, Portugal.

== History ==
=== Early years ===
Eduardo Ferreirinha was a race car driver and mechanic in the 1920s and 1930s. During the 1930s, Eduardo worked with his brother Jorge at the "Irmãos Ferreirinha" shop. Together they transformed Ford vehicles into race cars, which became popular with Portuguese racers. Modifications ranged from a lowered chassis to custom bodies to engine changes. The shop also designed and built suspension and engine parts, including the famous "Ferreirinha Pistons".

One of the shop's first prototype race cars was a modified Ford Model A called the "Ferreirinha Especial". Ferreirinha's experience with Ford products led to a partnership between his company "Ed Ferreirinha & Irmão" (EFI) and the largest Ford dealership in Porto - Manuel Menéres. The partnership sought to promote automobile racing in Portugal.

=== 1936–1937 ===
The next major step Ferreirinha took was in 1936, when he designed and built a race car from the ground up using the Ford V8 engine. Three cars were built using this model. One of the cars was raced by Ferreirinha himself and the other two by Manoel de Oliveira and his brother Casimiro de Oliveira. The car placed well in both national and international races, including 1st place at the 1937 Estoril International Circuit and 3rd place at the 1938 Gávea Circuit (Rio de Janeiro). These initial cars had not been branded by Ferreirinha, but were simply referred to as "Ford Especial V8s".

After the success of the Ford Especial V8s, Ferreirinha and Menéres decided to build a road version of the race car. The name EDFOR is often thought to have been formed from abbreviations of Eduardo (ED) and Ford (FOR), but it is actually derived from (ED)uardo (F)erreirinha and J(OR)ge (his brother).

The first public mention of the new brand was in the March 1937 issue of the ACP Magazine. The article mentioned that one of the most respected auto shops in Porto – Irmãos Ferreirinha – was still working on the EDFOR Automobile and that it would soon be available. It noted that the manufacturer was using a Ford motor, a modified frame, and a new body design that was hand-built by Portuguese workers.

The magazine O Volante then debuted the first image of the Edfor, with a drawing by Vital Ferreira. Further details were revealed by Eduardo Ferreirinha in an interview:

"(...)The Edfor cars are built in our shop with new parts, many transformed and others specially built by us. This initiative was born out of a lunch last September, at the Super Serviço Ford, when we had finished three special race cars from that brand. (...)"

The Edfor was unveiled to the public in April at the IX Salão Automóvel do Porto. The Edfor Grand Sport was a 2-seater with a torpedo-style aluminum body that weighed only 150 kg. The frame was made from a special cast alloy, which allowed the car to be very lightweight, weighing just 970 kg. (It is believed that this was the first time aluminium welding techniques were applied in Portugal, with Ferreirinha bringing them back from Czechoslovakia).

The engine was a 3.6, built by EFI based on the Ford V8 block with 90 HP. It had aerodynamic fenders, a new windshield design, and suspension seats. The 3-speed manual gearbox was modified to achieve 85 km/h in 1st gear (2.32), 130 km/h in 2nd gear (1.65), and a top speed of 160 km/h in 3rd (1.00). The steering had an intermediate multiplication box studied for increased safety. The front suspension was a new design with adjustable helical springs in series, and the shocks were adjusted on the dashboard with the new André Telecontrol. This gave the car a variable geometry that provided improved handling and safety. The brake drums were also modified with alloy fins for better cooling and braking.

The price was set at 55000.00 Escudos.

The idea behind the Grand Sport was to compete with cars such as the BMW 328, considered by the specialized press as one of the most beautiful and elegant sports cars of its time.

=== Media paradox ===
During the 1930s, a huge national debate was started by the automotive press led by O Volante with many articles and interviews concerning the creation of a Portuguese automotive brand. In 1937, the announcement of the EDFOR was a surprise. Finally, there was an automobile that was designed and had a large number of parts built in Portugal. But inexplicably, after the presentation of the EDFOR at the Porto auto show, there was little to no press follow-up. This effectively destroyed any sales impetus that had been previously created.

=== World War II ===
With the start of World War II, Ferreirinha's dream of building a production series came to an end.

Only four EDFORs had been built, and records show that only two of them were registered, one in June 1937 and another in August 1939. It's unknown what happened to the other two cars.

License plate RP-10-30 was raced by Eduardo Ferreirinha and then sold to Amadeu Manuel Seabra in 1939. He raced it up until the start of the war.

The first post-war race in Portugal took place in 1947, and Augusto Madureira raced the RP-10-30. Unfortunately his participation ended in a serious crash, destroying part of the car.

Even though the factory was shut down by that time, the EDFOR was still raced in 1951 and 1952 (the same RP-10-30) by Harry Rugeroni and Agostinho Sousa Roxo.

=== 2006–present ===
Filmmaker Manoel de Oliveira was honored at the 2006 Autoclássico at Exponor, Porto where his 1938 film «Já Se Fabricam Automóveis em Portugal» was shown after being lost for decades. It features footage of the factory and the Edfor cars.

At that time, he also came across the 1936 Edfor V8 that he had raced in his youth. The car had been recently restored by the current owner, a German by the name of Axel Walter, and was on display. It had been found in a Portuguese junkyard in 1974 and exported to Germany without any knowledge of the car's exceptional origins. In 2002, the current owner did some research and got in contact with the Ferreirinha family to confirm its authenticity. He bought the car and then began the difficult process of restoring it as closely as possible to its 1938 racing condition.

In 2009, the Caramulo Museum created a temporary exposition of Portuguese automobiles, which featured the Edfor. Material from the exposition was later turned into a book entitled "Automóveis Portugueses".

The Edfor Grand Sport (NT-10-68) remains in the Ferreirinha family. It continues to be featured in magazines and still shows up at many classic car events. It was displayed at the 2011 and 2012 Salão Motor Classico in Lisbon, Portugal.

The other Edfor "Especial V8" race car is still owned by Axel Walter in Germany.
