= Enzmann =

Former Swiss automobile manufacturer

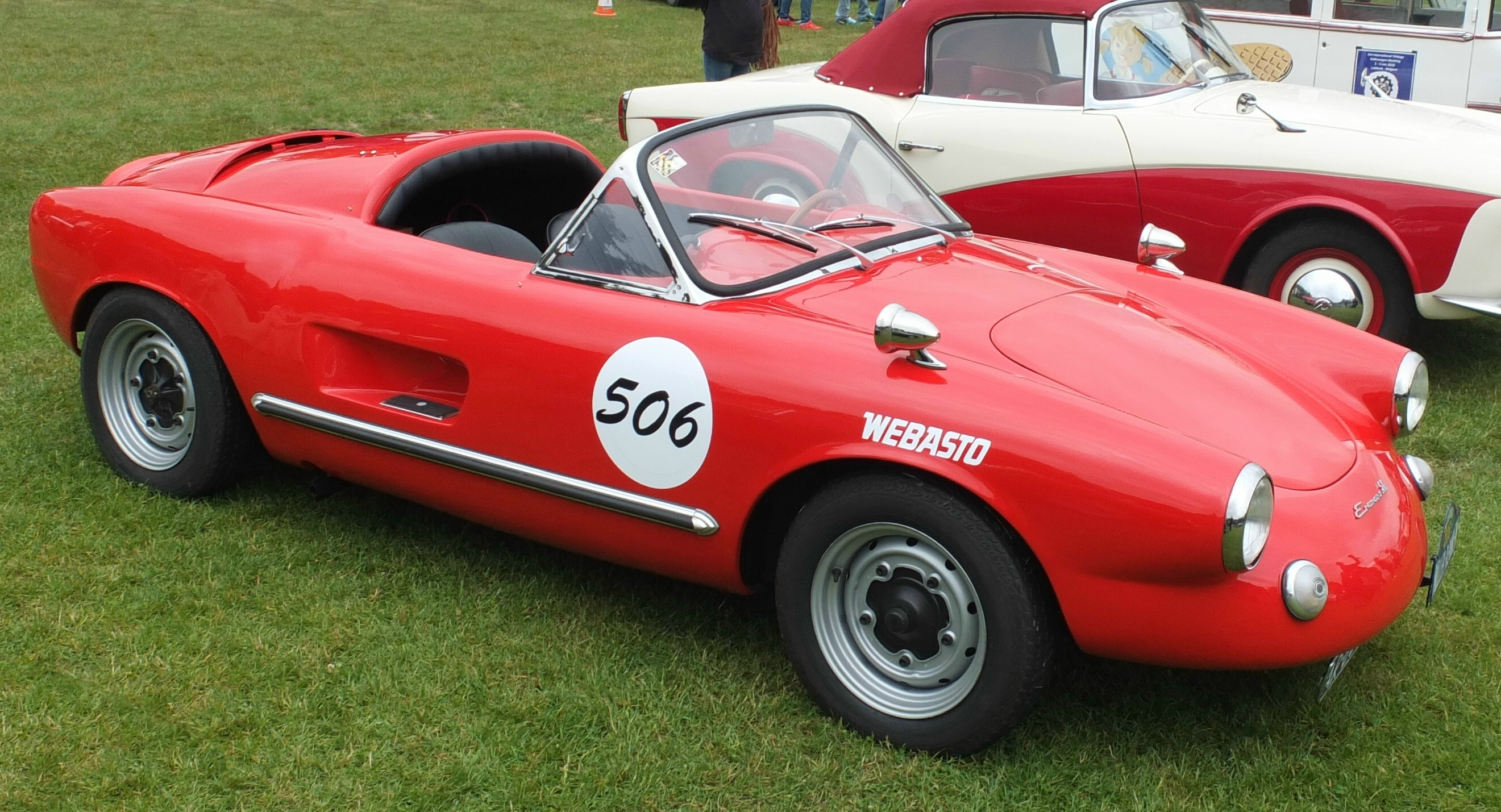
Enzmann 506

The Enzmann 506 is a Swiss automobile manufactured from 1957 until the late 1960s (some sources claim 1969 as the final year). The company purchased new Volkswagens, unbolted the Beetle body shells from the floorpans, and refitted them with fiberglass bodywork produced by a boatyard in Grandson. Some 100 cars were produced, and customers could also buy separate fiberglass bodies to make the assembly themselves.

== Overview ==
The car's name—506—was nothing more than the stand number under which Enzmann debuted their creation at the 1957 Frankfurt Auto Show. Volkswagen engines, naturally, were fitted as standard, but the similar Porsche 356 powerplant was also easy to fit into the Beetle chassis. Some owners also added Okrasa tuning parts to these engines, with MAG or Judson Superchargers.

As of 2009, it was reported that one could still buy an Enzmann body kit from the descendants of the car's creator.

== See also ==
- Porsche 356
- Porsche 914
- Volkswagen Karmann Ghia
