= Eniak Antique =

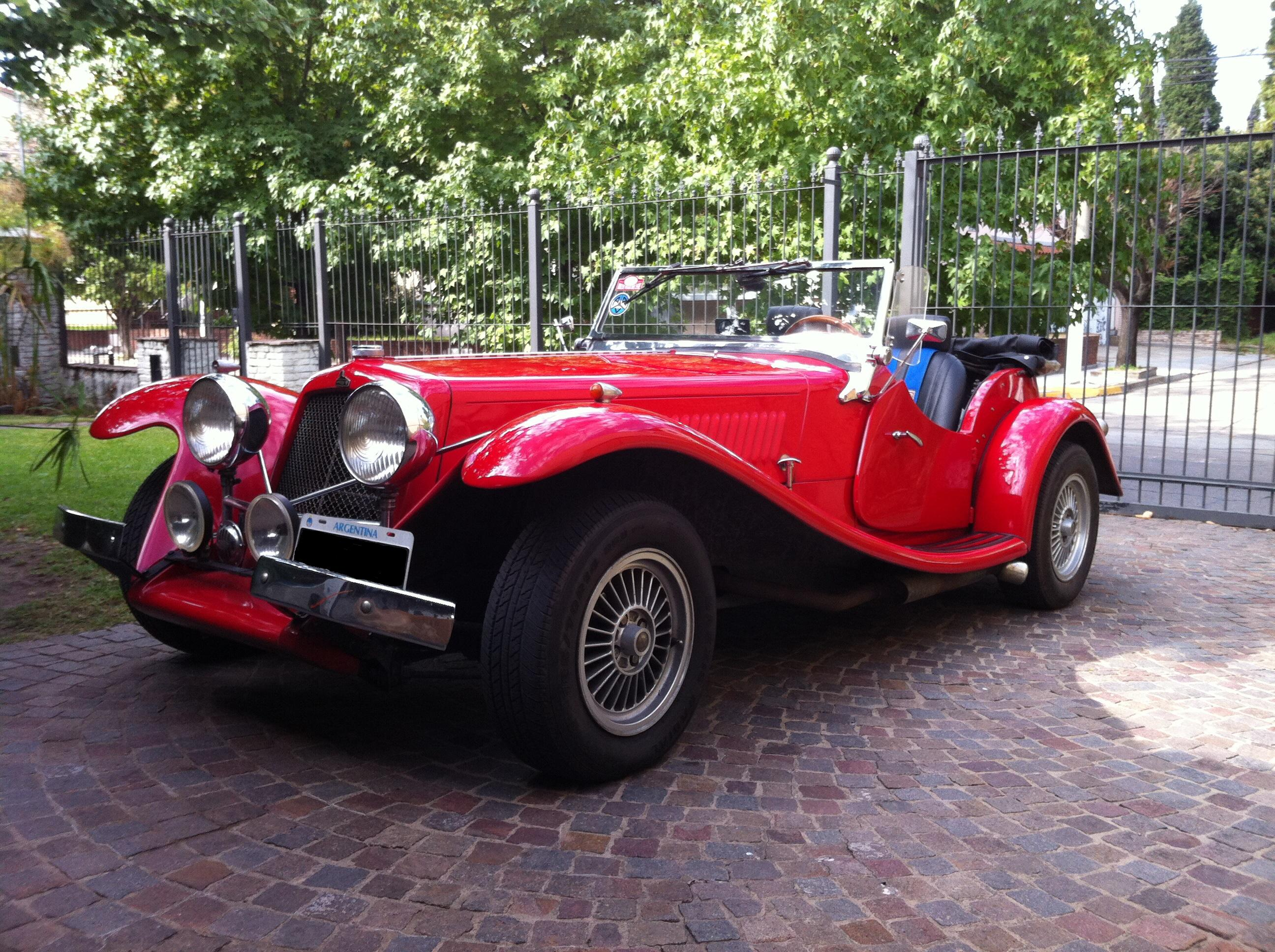

Overview
- Manufacturer: Eniak
- Production: 1983–1989
- Assembly: Buenos Aires, Argentina

Body and chassis
- Body style: 2-door roadster
- Layout: FR layout

Powertrain
- Engine: 1.8 VW-Dodge I4; 3.6 Ford 221 I6
- Transmission: 4-speed manual

Dimensions
- Wheelbase: 2,450 mm (96.5 in)
- Length: 3,900 mm (153.5 in)
- Width: 1,600 mm (63.0 in)
- Height: 1,270 mm (50.0 in)
- Curb weight: 750 kg (1,653 lb)

The Eniak Antique is an automobile built in Argentina by Eniak beginning in 1983. The Eniak company had hitherto mainly focused on electronics, some of which found their way into cars. The Antique was a metal-bodied, fiberglass-bumpers and doors, two-seat roadster that took its styling cues from the classic sports cars of the thirties, with some resemblance to the Alfa Romeo 8C. The cars have rear-wheel drive and a 1.8-liter inline-four with 92 PS (68 kW) or 110 PS (81 kW) depending on the state of tune. The engines came from the Volkswagen 1500 (originally a Hillman Avenger unit) and were tuned by Balestrini. The round gauges on the dashboard were of Eniak's own manufacture, and a traditional looking large four-spoke wooden steering wheel finished the job. A few cars were shipped to Japan in 1988, but Eniak still had to shut its doors in 1989.
