= Marca-Tre-Spade =

The Marca-Tre-Spade was an Italian automobile manufactured from 1908 until 1911. The four-cylinder 24 hp (18 kW) IOE cars, with four-speed gearboxes, were the product of a well-known gunsmith.
