= Vinaxuki =

Former Vietnamese vehicle manufacturer

- Industry: Cars
- Founded: 2004, Vietnam
- Defunct: 2015
- Headquarters: Thanh Hóa Province, Vietnam
- Area served: Vietnam
- Key people: Bùi Ngọc Huyên

Vinaxuki or Xuan Kien Auto JSC was a Vietnamese automaker (and brand name) headquartered in Hanoi, Vietnam. Established in 2004, the company manufactured and assembled cars and mini trucks under its own brand name as well as other Chinese brands. Since it was established, Vinaxuki launched 38 truck models, two semi-truck models, two touring car models and two coach models. Operation ceased in 2015.

== Products ==
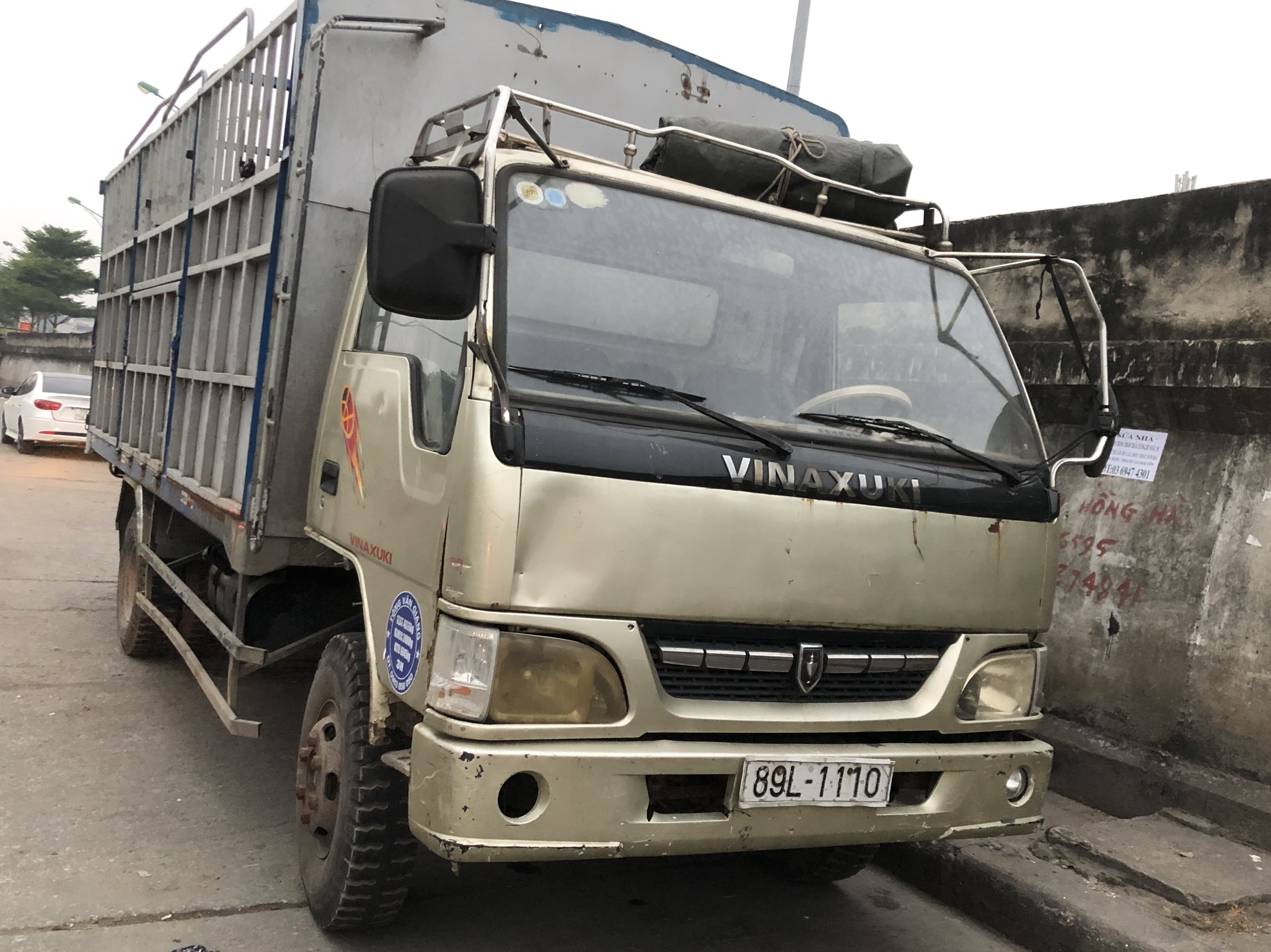
Vinaxuki Truck

=== Automobiles ===
- Vinaxuki Pickup 650X – Pick-up truck
- Songhuajiang HFJ6376 – Minivan
- Hafei HFJ7110E – Subcompact hatchback

=== Minitrucks ===
- Vinaxuki 3500TL, 990T, 1490T
- Jinbei: various models
- Songhuajiang HFJ1011G

=== Trucks ===
- Vinaxuki 3450T, 5500TL, 8500TL, 2500BA, 3000BA, 4500BA, 5000BA, 7000BA
