= Pancar Motor =

Pancar Motor was founded in 1956 and manufactured Turkey's first diesel engines. The company is still producing today.
