= Timmis (car) =

Timmis Ford V8
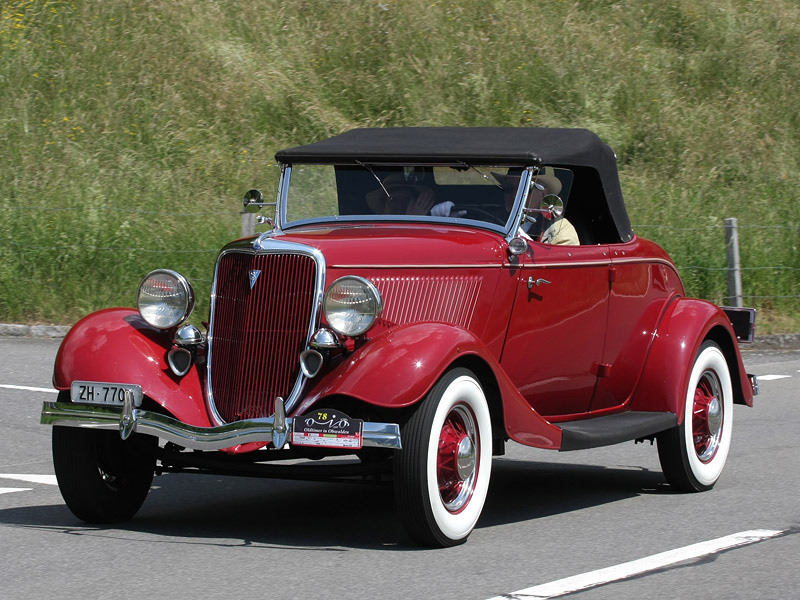

Overview
- Manufacturer: Timmis Motor Company
- Production: since 1968
- Assembly: Victoria, British Columbia, Canada

Body and chassis
- Class: Sports car
- Body style: 2-door roadster
- Layout: FR layout
- Related: Ford V-8

Powertrain
- Engine: 3.9L V8
- Transmission: 3-speed manual

Dimensions
- Wheelbase: 112 in (2,845 mm)
- Length: 175.9 in (4,468 mm)
- Width: 67.4 in (1,712 mm)
- Height: 65.5 in (1,664 mm)
- Curb weight: 2,300 lb (1,043 kg)

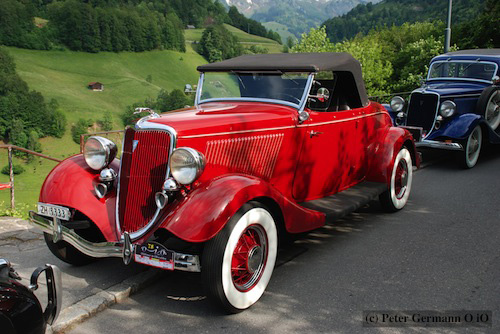

The Timmis Ford V8 is a 2-door roadster based on the 1934 Ford V-8. It is produced by the Timmis Motor Company, a small-scale Canadian car producer based in Victoria, British Columbia, Canada.

The car is built using original parts from 1934 (frame with the original 1934 Ford serial number stamped in, wheels, headlights, grille, instruments) which are sourced from unused stock parts found in warehouses all over the world. Other chassis parts, the transmission, the differential, the brakes and the steering unit have the original 1934 outward appearance, but more modern internal parts. This provides the original look with a more up-to-date performance. The body and the hood are new and hand-made by Timmis. Other small body fittings are manufactured by suppliers. The engine is custom built at the Ford of Canada Engine Remanufacturing Plant to modern specification and provided with a Ford warranty. It is a 3.9 litre Ford flathead V8 with dimensions similar to the original engine used in the Ford V-8. However, this engine has 50% more power at 125 b.h.p. According to the manufacturer, the optimum cruising speed of the car is 50-55 mph (80-88 km/h). The top speed is stated to be 100 mph (160 km/h).

The Timmis Motor Company, founded by Andrew J. Timmis, has been producing the Timmis Ford V8, a recreation of the 1934 Ford V-8, since 1968 in small numbers. Other activities of the company include used-car sales.
