= APIS (automobiles) =

Automobile factory in Italy

- Founded: 1903
- Founder: Eugenio Oliveri
- Headquarters: Palermo, Sicily, Italy
- Products: Automobiles, Electric vehicles

APIS was an automobile factory from Palermo, in Italy, founded in 1903 by Eugenio Oliveri, active in the early 1900s.

== History ==
APIS was founded by Eugenio Oliveri. He was a prominent figure in the Palermo political-industrial scene. Senator of the Kingdom of Italy, three times mayor of Palermo. In 1903 he took over a "mechanical constructions with foundry" plant from Pietro Corsi, however, he left the position of director. The factory was specialized in various types of construction, to which were added the electric cars with 4 to 10 HP, the gasoline cars with 5 to 10 hp with engines of 1, 2, 4 and 8 cylinders, with or without reverse speed lever, cardan and chain transmission, fan cooling (own patent), equipped with all the improvements discovered until then, and steam cars from 25 to 50 hp. The company was short-lived and closed after producing about ten cars.

== Production ==
The company had produced:

- electric cars;
- gasoline cars;
- steam cars;
- steam boilers;
- extraction machines;
- driving machines;
- electric pumps;
- hydraulic motors;
- hydraulic presses;
- gas engines.

== Bibliography ==
- (in Italian) Mario Taccari, "Palermo l'altro ieri", S.F. Flaccovio (1966);
- (in Italian) Francesco Brancato, "Storia dell’industria a Palermo", Edizioni Giada (1991).
