= EdisonFuture =

American electric vehicle manufacturer

- Industry: Automotive
- Founded: 2020; 6 years ago
- Headquarters: Livermore, California, US
- Parent: SPI Energy
- Website: edisonfuture.com

EdisonFuture is an American startup company that plans to produce electric pickup trucks and vans. It was established in 2020 and is based in Livermore, California.

== History ==
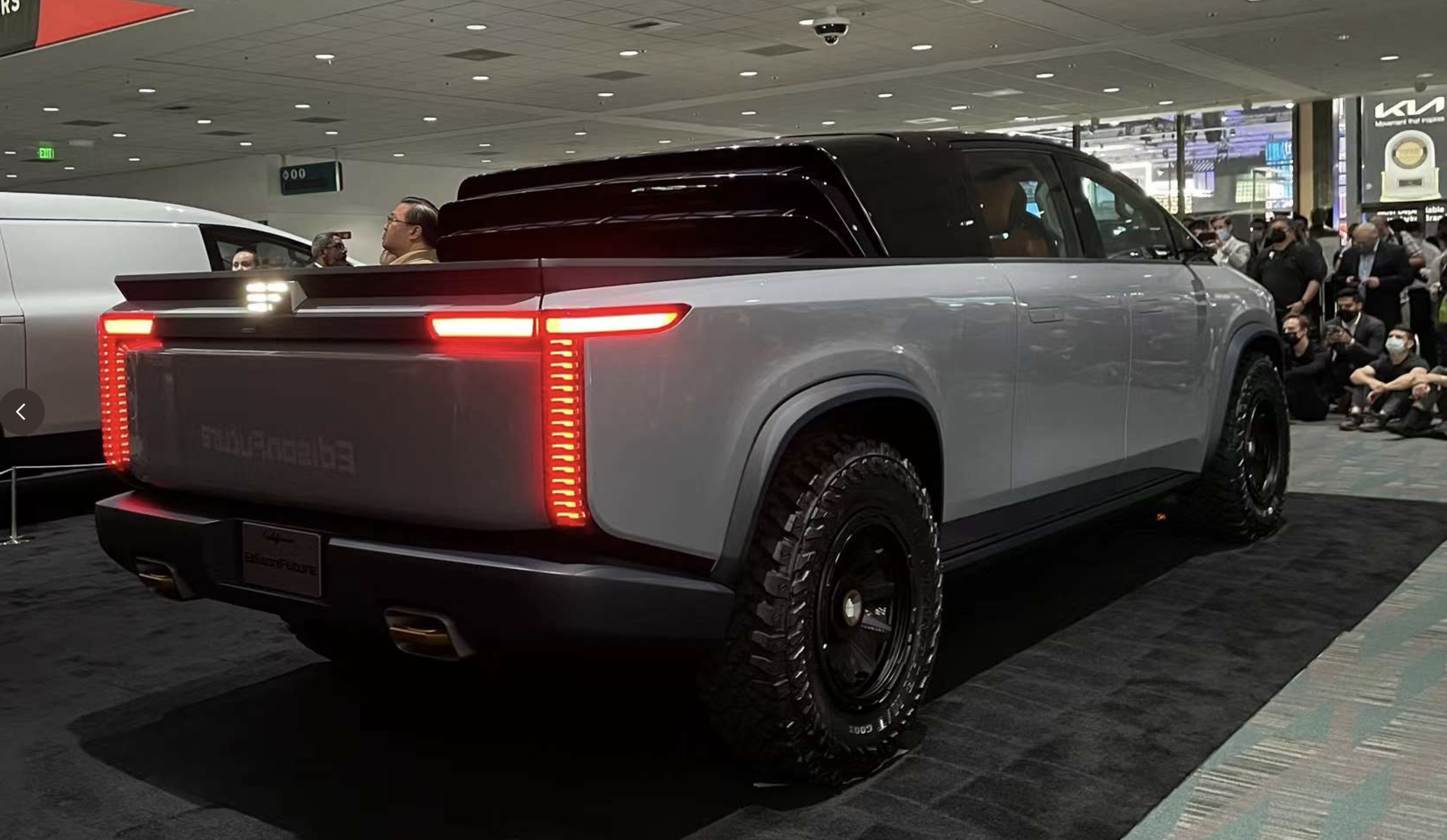
EdisonFuture EF1-T electric truck.

In 2020, SPI Energy, which already owned a full stake in the local company Phoenix Motorcars, decided to expand its presence in the United States by creating the EdisonFuture startup. In January 2021, the company started cooperation with the Icona Design styling office, which was commissioned to develop the appearance of the first planned EdisonFuture vehicles. In July 2026, EdisonFuture filed for Chapter 11 bankruptcy protection.

=== Models ===
In mid-October 2021, EdisonFuture presented detailed visuals of its first vehicle, the EF1. Available both as a full-size 4-door pickup truck and a built-in pickup truck, it is expected to go on sale in the first half of 2022.

EdisonFuture is integrating solar panels into its vehicles as a method to enhance driving range. The company has designed its pickup and van models to include photovoltaic cells on the roof, bed cover, and the dashboard of the pickup. According to the manufacturer, these solar panels could potentially increase the daily range by 25 to 35 miles under optimal conditions.

The American startup company is targeting the heart of the e-pickup market by aligning the EF1-T with the traditional half-ton format. The truck's dimensions and design closely match those of the best-selling F-150 and its electric variant, the Lightning, positioning the EF1-T as a direct competitor in this popular segment.

EdisonFuture plans to launch its EF1-T electric truck in three different trims. The Standard model features a 120-kWh battery and a single motor that delivers 440 horsepower and an estimated range of 300 miles. It can accelerate from 0 to 60 mph (97 km/h) in 6.5 seconds. The Premium EF1-T steps up with a 150-kWh battery and two motors, boosting the horsepower to 690 and increasing the range to 380 miles, while also reducing the 0 to 60 mph time to 4.5 seconds. The range-topping EF1-TS Super trim offers a 180-kWh battery and three motors, resulting in a total of 816 horsepower and extending the range to 450 miles. This model achieves a 0 to 60 mph time of 3.9 seconds. EdisonFuture is also developing a van model, the EF1-V. It will be offered in both single and dual-motor versions. The van can accelerate from 0 to 60 mph in 6.5 seconds.

The EF1-T standard model with a single rear motor is rated to tow 7,500 pounds. The EF1-TP premium two-motor variant can tow 9,000 pounds. The top EF1-TS Super tri-motor range topper can tow 11,000 pounds. The EF1-V van the rear-drive model can tow 7,500 pounds, and the two-motor AWD long-range model can tow 8,000 pounds.
