= Rosmo =

- Industry: Automotive
- Founded: 1936
- Founder: Severino Rosmo Baratto
- Headquarters: Quetzaltenango, Guatemala
- Products: buses
- Website: www.rosmo.com

Rosmo, founded as Carrocerías ROSMO by Mr. Severino Rosmo Baratto in 1936, is a Quetzaltenango, Guatemala-based bus manufacturer for the Guatemalan market.
