= Takeoka Auto Craft =

Japanese automobile manufacturer

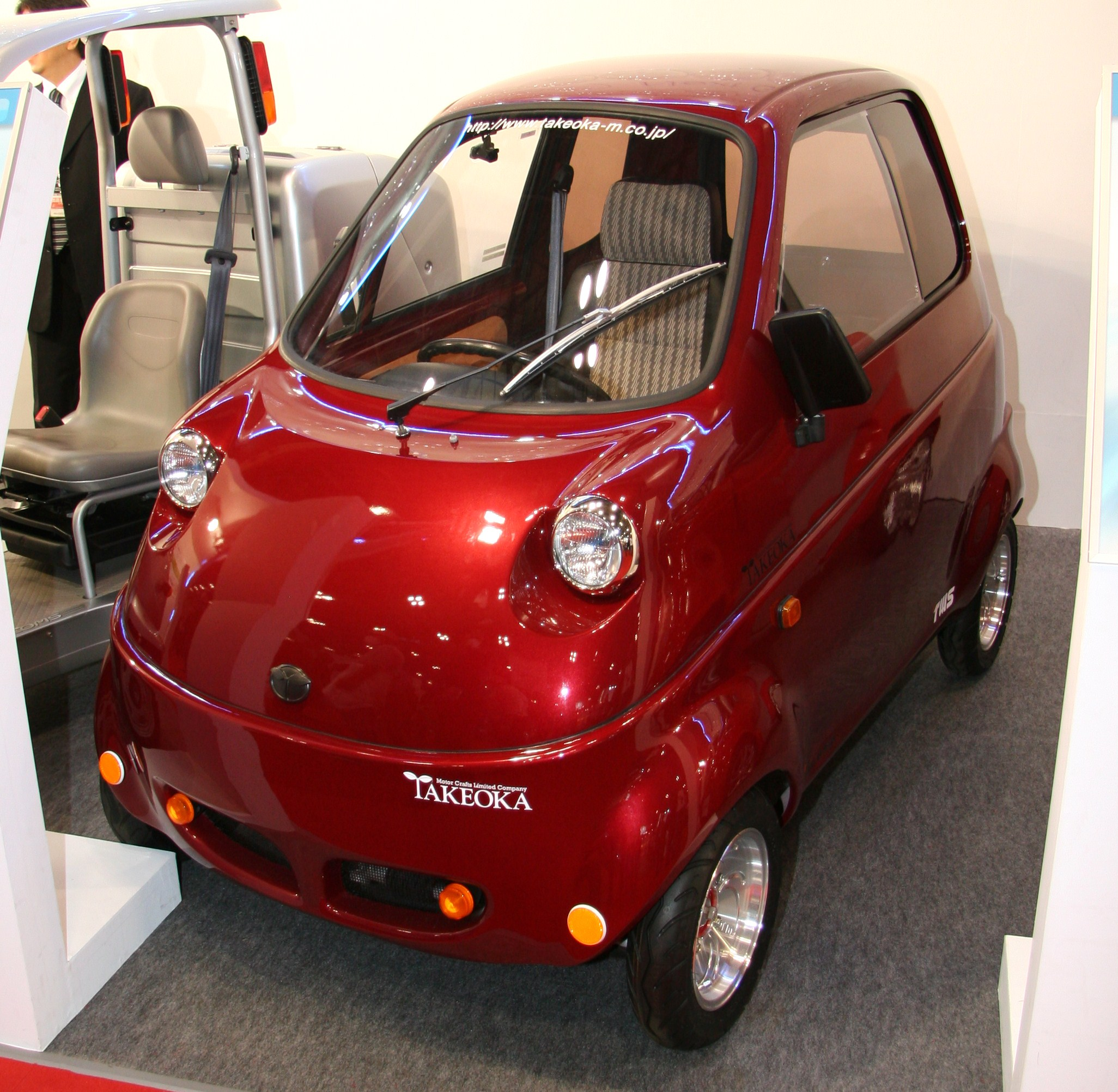
- Takeoka Milieu
- Type: Yūgen gaisha
- Industry: Automotive
- Founded: 1 October 1982; 43 years ago
- Headquarters: Toyama, Japan
- Products: Automobiles

Takeoka Auto Craft Co. Ltd. (有限会社タケオカ自動車工芸, Takeoka Jidōsha Kōgei), commonly known as Takeoka, is a Japanese automobile manufacturer that specializes in microcars.

== Company history ==
The company was founded in 1981 in Toyama. On October 1, 1982, the entry was made as a Yūgen gaisha. The production of small cars began in 1990. The brand name is Takeoka.

In 1998 the range was expanded to include electric cars.

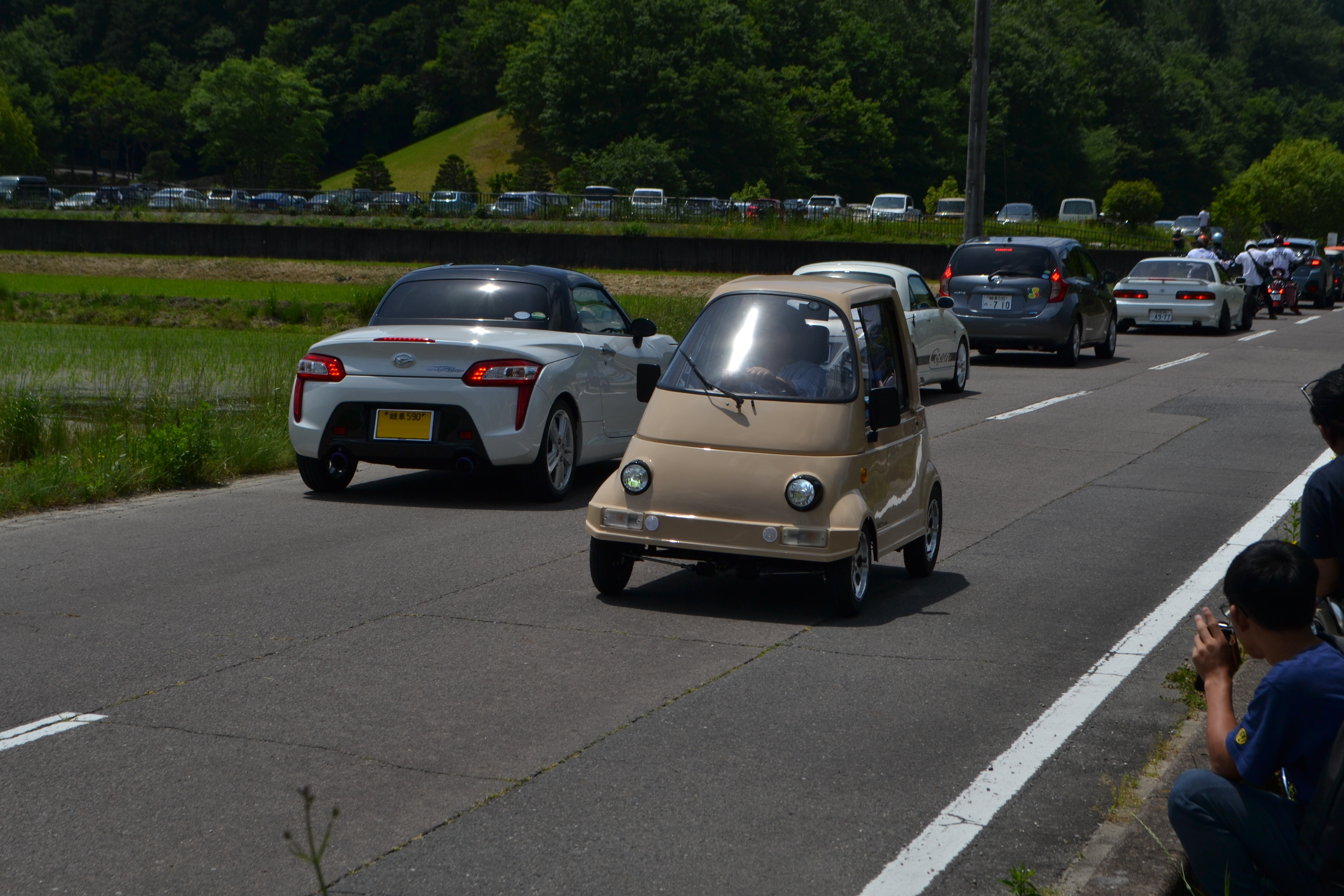
Abbey

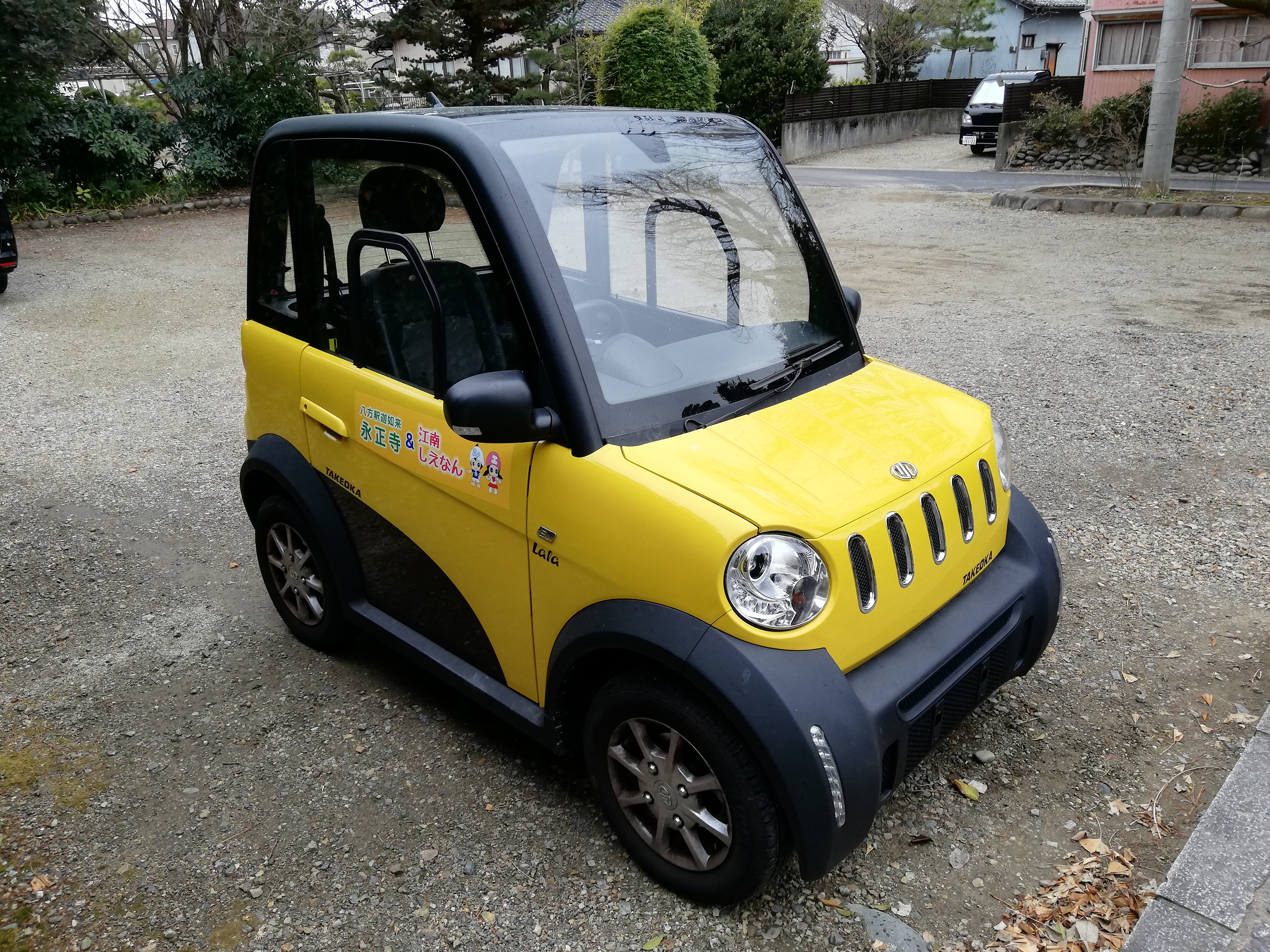
Lala

== Products ==
Takeoka's first model, the Abbey (ア ビ ー, Abī), was 215 cm long and weighed about 145 kg. A 49 cc engine drove the vehicles. Until 1997, about 1,500 Abbeys were sold. The current series, the Abbey Carrot, uses a water-cooled four-cylinder engine sourced from the Yamaha CE50 scooter, featuring a displacement of 50 cm³, weighing 160 kg, and has a top speed of 60 km/h (37 mph).

The Lala (ララ) is a one-seater electric minicar (motorized four-wheeled bicycle) that contains the same features as a typical mini-car, launched in 2016. Vehicles manufactured by China's Jiayuan Automobile are imported, modified independently, and sold.

Discontinued

The Rookie (ル ー キ ー, Rūkī) is a three-wheel covered electric motor scooter with a length of 180 cm, a weight of 110 kg, and a top speed of 34 km/h (21 mph). (1997－2024)

The Milieu (ミ リ ュ ー R, Miryū R) is an electric microcar, measuring 215 cm in length and weighing 295 kg, with a maximum speed of 60 km/h (37 mph), and a range of 50 km. (2000－2024)

The T-10 is also an electric car measuring at 224 cm in length, 365 kg in weight, with a 55 km/h (34 mph) top speed, and a 45 km range. There is a T-10G version with a 50 cm² petrol engine made for long-distance journeys. (2011－2024)

In addition, the company released an electric snow plow, the Oscha (オ ス チ ャ, Osucha) in 2013.
