= Khodro Kaveer =

Automobile company based in Yazd, Iran

- Company type: Private company
- Industry: Automotive
- Founded: 2001, Ardakan
- Headquarters: Tehran and Ardakan, Yazd Province, Iran
- Key people: Masoud Haratifar (CEO)
- Products: Automobiles; Commercial vehicles; Automotive parts
- Website: http://www.kai.co.ir

Khodro Kaveer is an automobile company based in Yazd, Iran. Established in 2001, it makes BMC and Cumitas cars.

Kaveer Automotive Industrial Corporation (in Persian: شرکت صنایع خودرو کویر), also known as Khodro Kaveer, is an Automotive Company headquartered in Ardakan. Khodro Kaveer was established in 2001, to assemble and produce BMCs under license for the Iranian market. The CEO of Khodro Kaveer is Masoud Haratifar, predecessor of whom was Mohammad Reza Soroush.
