= Edran =

Belgian automobile manufacturer

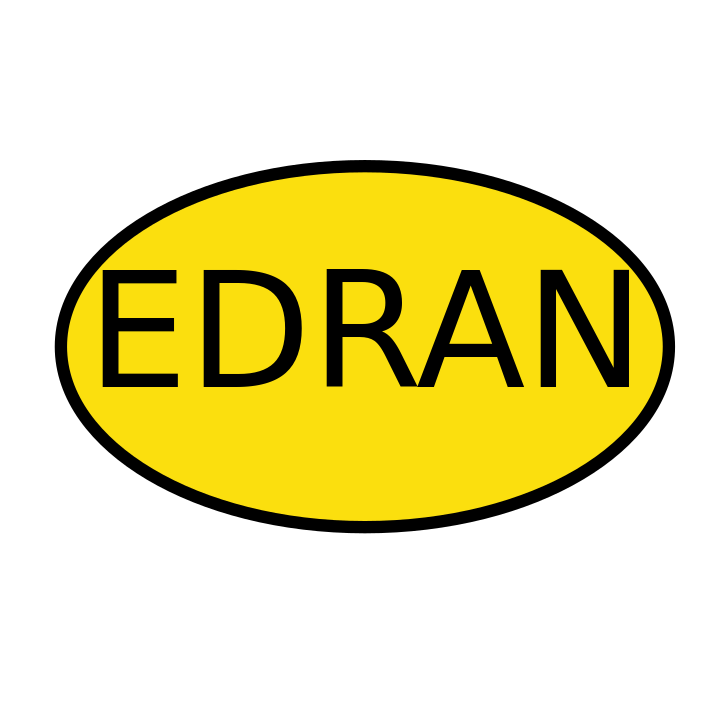
- Company type: Automobile manufacturer
- Founded: 1984
- Founder: André Hanjoul
- Headquarters: Belgium
- Products: Automobiles
- Website: www.edran.be

Edran is a Belgian automobile manufacturer. The company was founded in 1984 by André Hanjoul. The first car to be displayed in public was the Edran Spyder MK I at the 1994 Brussels Motor Show. In 2006, the company introduced its newest sports car, the Edran Enigma.

== Spider Mk I ==
According to the company's website, the Spider Mk I has a 4-cylinder engine with 150 or 180 horsepower (130 kW) and a top speed of 210 km/h (130 mph ) or 230 km/h (142 mph), respectively. The body is made of fiberglass, carbon fiber, and Kevlar, giving a total weight of 710 kg.

== Enigma ==
According to the company's website, the Enigma has an 800 horsepower (600 kW), center-mounted 8-cylinder engine. It has a top speed of 340 km/h (211 mph). The body and chassis are made of carbon fiber and Kevlar, giving the Enigma a total weight of 1,240 kg.

== See also ==
- List of automobile manufacturers
- List of car brands
- List of Western European automobile manufacturers
