= Vega EVX =

Overview
- Manufacturer: Vega Innovations
- Also called: Vega EVX Supercar
- Production: 2022 (expected) 25 units.
- Designer: Dhash M Gunaratne

Body and chassis
- Class: Sports car (S)
- Body style: 2-door coupe
- Layout: 4 motor torquing all-wheel drive

Powertrain
- Transmission: Automatic
- Hybrid drivetrain: Permanent AC Synchronous 4 Motor torquing all-wheel drive system
- Battery: LFP Pouch cell 540V, Liquid cooled. 50 Cells per Module, 12 Modules 480kg.
- Electric range: 300 km (186 mi)
- Plug-in charging: Offboard charger

Dimensions
- Wheelbase: 2,846 mm (112.0 in)
- Length: 4,532 mm (178.4 in)
- Width: 1,970 mm (77.6 in)
- Height: 1,220 mm (48.0 in)
- Curb weight: 1,900 kg (4,200 lb)

The Vega EVX is an all-electric battery-powered two-seater AWD sports car developed by Sri Lankan automobile manufacturer Vega Innovations and was planned to enter production in 2022. The first vehicle was registered in 2023.

== Development ==
Both the electronics and software for Vega EVX were designed and developed in Sri Lanka and in-house by Vega Innovations. Components developed include with the Liquid Cooled Battery-pack Motor-controller, Body Controller, Thermal Control System, Digital Infotainment System and Instrument Cluster.

== Introduction ==
The serial version prototype of the Vega EVX was to be presented at the Geneva Motor Show in March 2020 but was canceled due to the COVID-19 pandemic. However, the car was unveiled in a live stream at the Geneva Motor Show in 2020.

== Specifications and performance ==
The car weighs 2,090 kg (4,610 lb) out of which, the battery is responsible for 480 kilograms (1,060 lb). Vega EVX prototype has two 300-kilowatt (402 hp; 408 PS) electric motors each positioned on the front and rear axles, providing it with all-wheel drive and allowing it a cumulative power of 600 kW (805 hp; 816 PS) and 760 N⋅m (561 lb⋅ft; 77 kg⋅m) of torque. The EVX initially receives a small LiFePo4 (lithium iron phosphate) battery with a capacity of 55 kWh (200 MJ), placed in the rear center position, allowing it a range of 300 kilometres (190 mi), before the arrival of a larger battery of 130 kWh (470 MJ) increasing its autonomy to 250 kilometres (160 mi). and from 0–100 km/h (0–62 mph) in 3.1 seconds with a top speed of 240 km/h (150 mph).

VEGA Innovations has described the production version of the Vega EVX can accelerate from 0–100 km/h (0–62 mph) in less than two seconds, and achieve a top speed of 380 km/h (240 mph) with a 750 kilometres (470 mi) battery range.
