= Vinci (automobile) =

Vinci GT
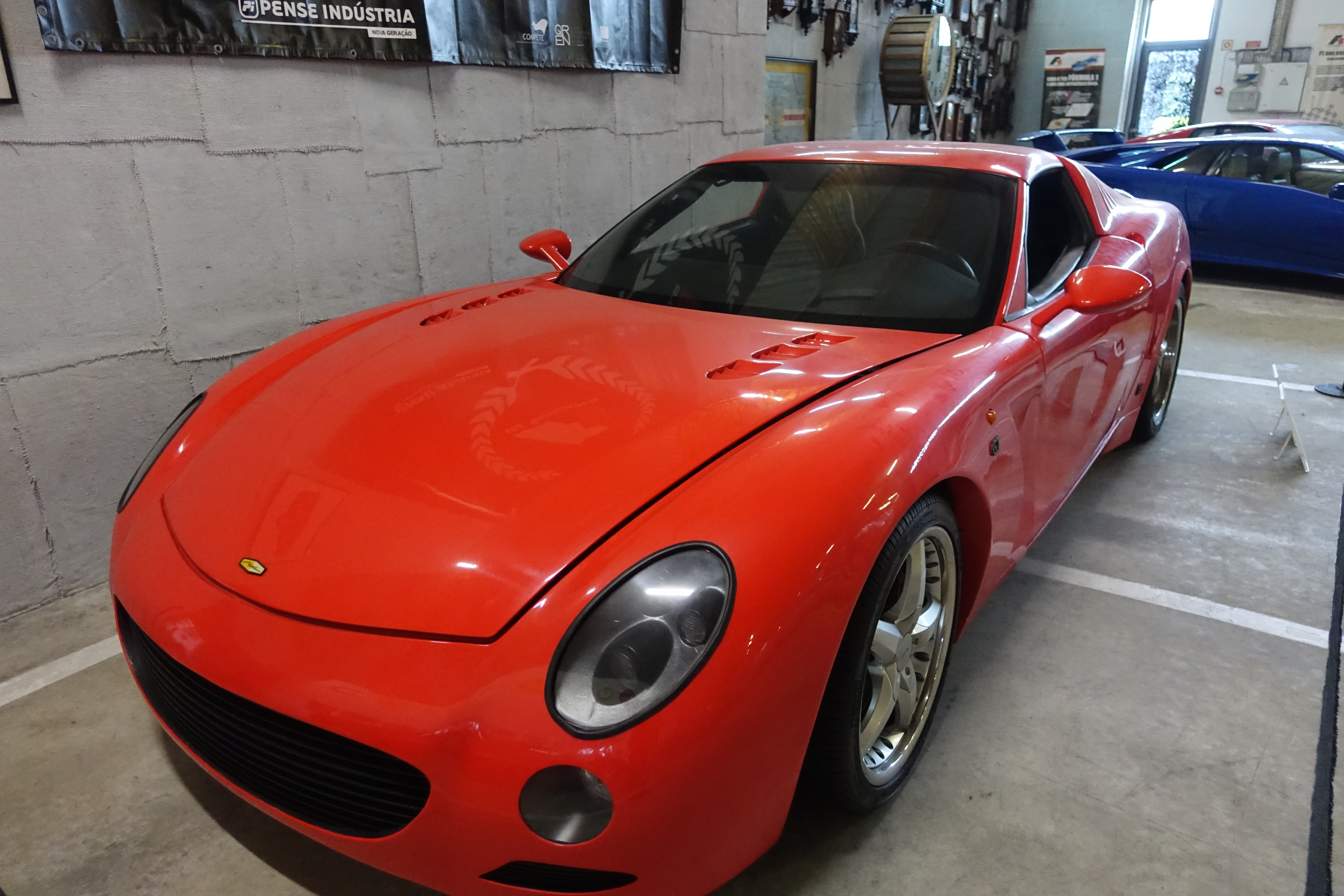

Overview
- Manufacturer: Retroconcept/Retrosport
- Production: 2007
- Designer: Ernesto Freitas

Body and chassis
- Class: Sports car (S)
- Body style: two-door coupé
- Related: Chevrolet Corvette C5

Powertrain
- Engine: GM LS engine
- Transmission: 4-speed manual

Vinci is a Portuguese-based project for a brand of cars (possibly owned by a development stage company called Retroconcept or Retrosport (both names are referred to in sources)).

In 2007 the brand announced the first Portuguese sports car. Its design was inspired by the cars of the 60's and 70's. The car is equipped with the GM LS engine, the same as the Chevrolet Corvette. The rest of car was claimed to be a product of Portuguese engineering (serious doubts on this matter are expressed on the Portuguese Wikipedia page for the car, given that it appears to be a modified Corvette C5 instead of a newly build vehicle using the Corvette's engine), produced with the experience of working for other brands like UMM and Bravia (builder of the Chaimite series of armoured vehicles). The brand, Vinci, is also developing other models like Vinci Sport, Vinci TT (from the Portuguese "Todo-o-terreno" All Terrain) and Vinci Eco (a 'nature-friendly' car). The company wants to forget less successful Portuguese experiences in the automotive industry, such as UMM and Bravia, and instead follow the example of AJP, a Portuguese builder of motorcycles.

Some sources suggest that CEIIA (Centro para a Excelência e Inovação na Indústria Automóvel), from Maia Municipality, was involved in the original development of the car, although the CEIIA site contained no obvious reference to the car in April 2009.

On 2009-04-19 the Brazilian TV program Auto Esporte ran an article on the car. The program reported that the Auto Museu Da Maia, a car museum in the town of Maia, near the city of Porto, Portugal, had some role in the development of the car.
