= Baltasar Cars =

Spanish electric car manufacturer

- Company type: Private
- Industry: Automotive
- Founded: 2011
- Founder: Batasar López
- Headquarters: Barcelona, Spain
- Products: Automobiles
- Number of employees: 11-50
- Website: https://baltasar.com/

Baltasar Cars is a Spanish manufacturer of electric sports cars based in Barcelona, operating since 2011.

== History ==
Baltasar Cars was founded in 2011 in Barcelona by a Spanish Formula Electric racing driver and engineer and entrepreneur Batasar López. The startup got its name from the name of the founder and focused on the development of road, fully electric sports cars. Starting from the year of establishment, for the next decade, Baltasar engineers were focused on working on their first car model, developed from scratch to a ready-to-sell form.

The premiere of the first Baltasar Cars vehicle took place 10 years after its establishment, in the second half of April 2021. The Baltasar Revolt was presented in the form of a two-seater track car admitted to traffic at the same time: no windows, streamlined silhouette and fully electric drive.

Baltasar Cars is planning a low-volume production of the Revolt, taking into account the preferences of the individual customer, starting with the first deliveries of the finished cars in mid-2022. The price per copy was set at EUR 230,000.

== Car models ==
- Baltasar Revolt
