= Potential Motors =

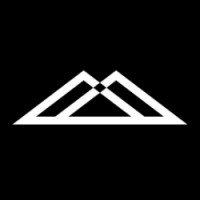
Potential Motors logo.

Potential Motors was a Canadian automotive technology company based in Fredericton, New Brunswick.

It launched its first product in 2022 called Adventure 1.

The Adventure 1 is designed specifically for off-road use, featuring a narrow body and is fully electric. It is equipped with dual-motors with four-wheel drive via differentials. It produces 604 hp and 737 lb-ft of torque. The battery is 70kWh with a claimed range of 100 miles of off-road driving.

The Adventure 1 showcases the company's Off-Road OS system, a real-time terrain detection & vehicle control AI technology.

In December 2023, the company announced it had partnered with CFMOTO USA to integrate Terrain Intelligence and Off-Road OS onto side-by-sides for the first time. Potential also revealed that it was working with "global leaders in automotive, mining and defense sectors" although it did not name any of these partners.

The company was co-founded in 2018 by Sam Poirier, who is also CEO. In 2019, Poirier was named on Atlantic Business Magazine's 30 under 30. He was also a recipient of The Globe and Mail's 2021 Changemakers Award.

The company raised USD$4m in 2022. Investors include Chris Newton (founder of Radian6, which was acquired in 2011 by Salesforce), Marcel LeBrun (former CEO at Radian6) and Marc Benioff.

The company sold all of its core technology to a global manufacturer in 2025.
