= Heibao Auto =

Chinese automotive manufacturing company

Shandong HIPO Group Co., Ltd. dba (Heibao Auto)
- Type: Private company
- Traded as: Zhonghang Heibao Co., Ltd. SSE: 600760
- Industry: Automotive
- Headquarters: Weihai, China
- Key people: Wang Zhigang (President)
- Products: Automobiles, agricultural vehicles
- Number of employees: Approx. 3,000
- Subsidiaries: Zhonghang Heibao Co., Ltd.,
- Website: www.heibao.com

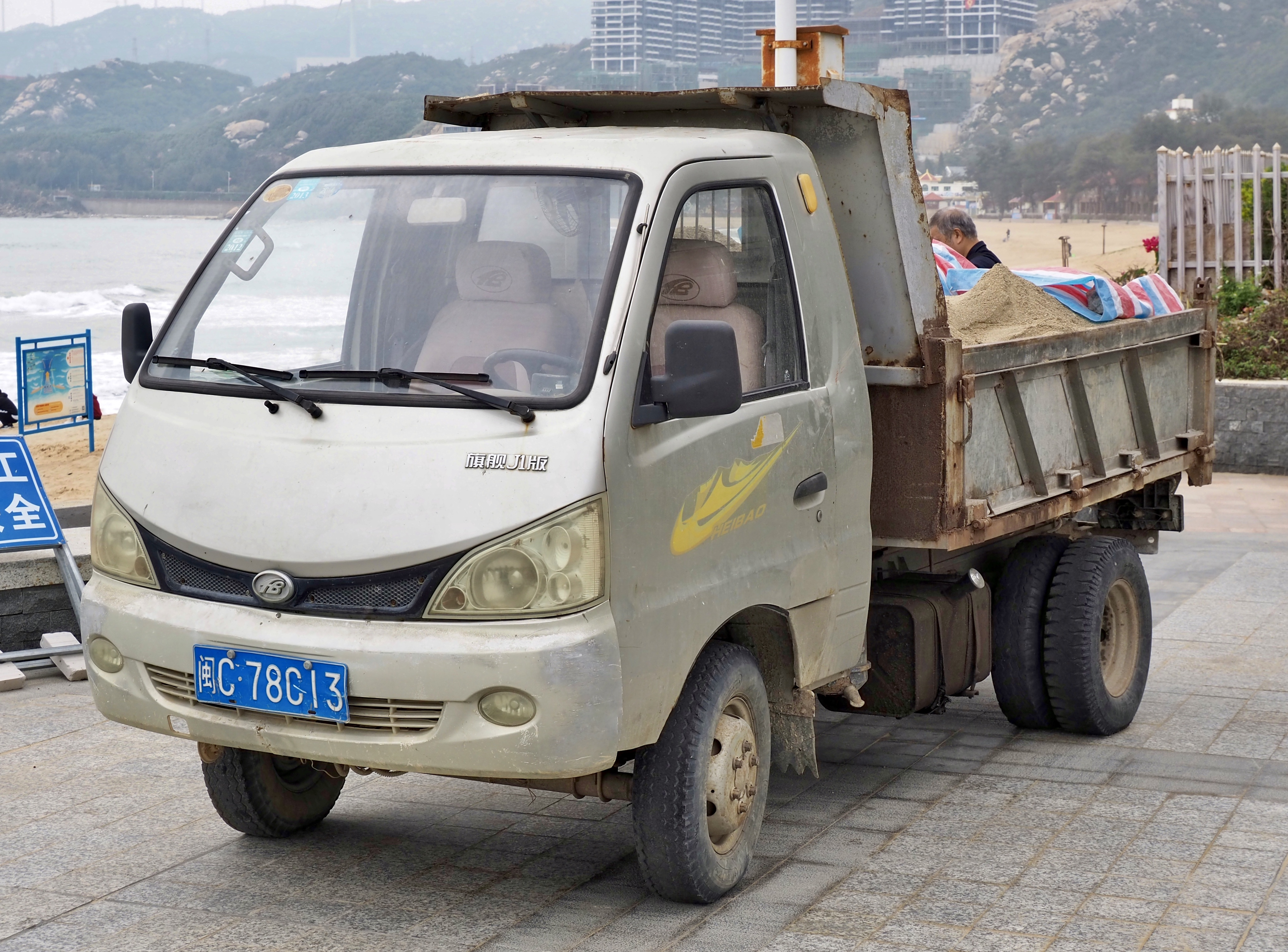
Heibao Q7

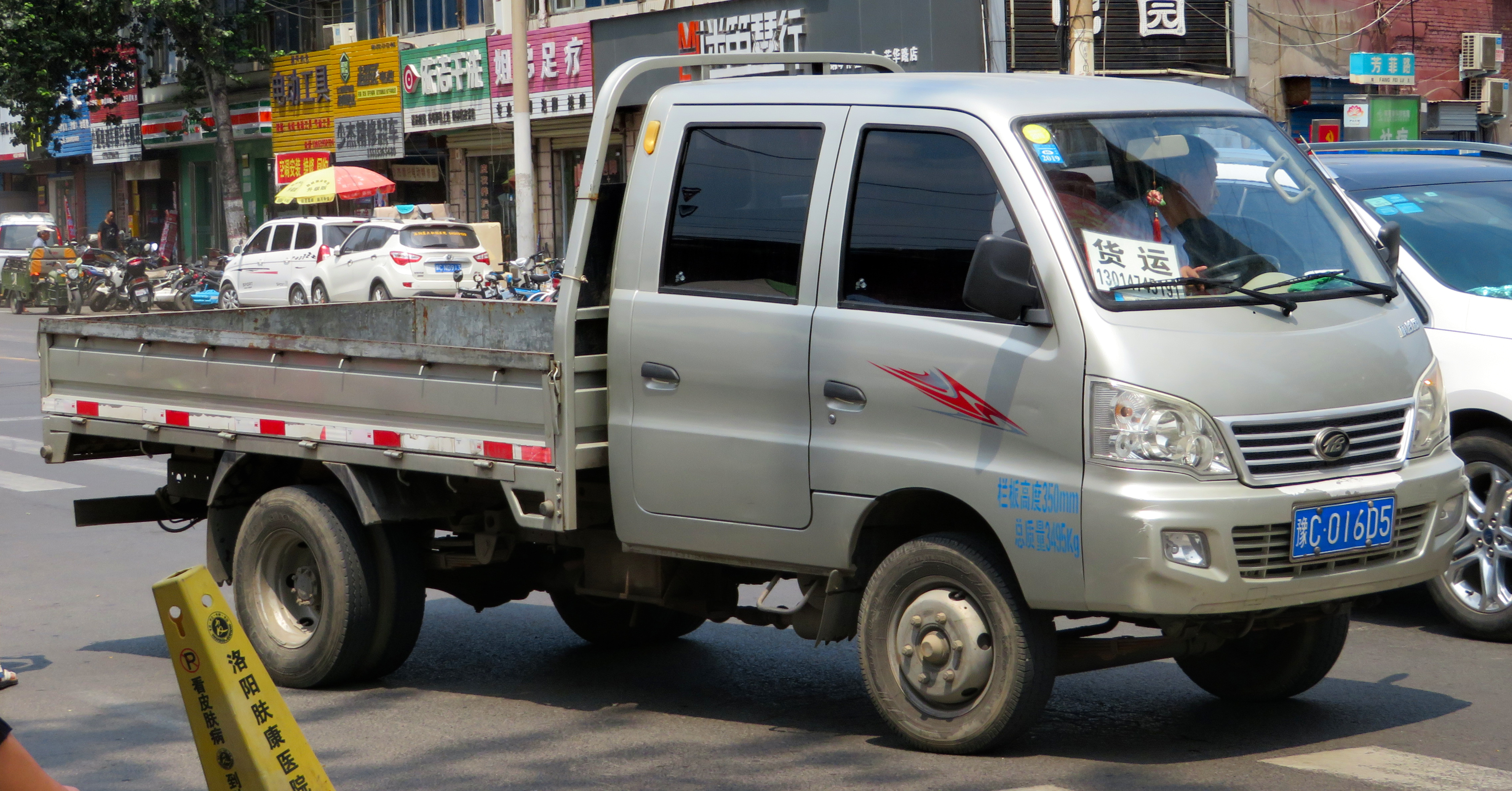
Heibao H3

Heibao Auto (黑豹汽车; officially Shandong HIPO Group Co., Ltd.) is a Chinese automotive manufacturing company headquartered in Weihai.

Zhonghang Heibao Co., Ltd., a subsidiary of Heibao, is listed on the Shanghai Stock Exchange.

Heibao Auto's production capacity is 100,000 vehicles per year.

In June 1993, Shandong Black Panther Co., Ltd. (later renamed Dongan Black Panther Co., Ltd. according to the adjustment of equity composition) was established by Wendeng Agricultural Transport Vehicle Factory through targeted raising. It is a listed company on the Shanghai Stock Exchange.

In 2010, Dongan Black Panther acquired part or all of the equity interests of Anhui Kaile Special Vehicle Co., Ltd., Liuzhou Chenglong Special Vehicle Co., Ltd., and Shanghai Aviation Special Vehicle Co., Ltd., becoming a subsidiary of Jincheng Group Co., Ltd., and changed its name AVIC Black Panther Co., Ltd. In 2015, Beijing Automobile Manufacturing Co., Ltd., AVIC Black Panther Co., Ltd. and Weihai Ruihai Construction and Development Co., Ltd. jointly invested in the establishment of BAIC Black Panther (Weihai) Automobile Co., Ltd., and the production plant of Black Panther was transferred from AVIC Black Panther to BAIC Black Panther.

In August 2016, AVIC Black Panther's major asset restructuring project was launched. AVIC Black Panther sold all business assets to Jincheng Group in cash, and issued shares to Aviation Industry Corporation of China and Huarong Company to purchase 100% of the equity they held in total in Shenyang Aircraft Group. In 2017, AVIC Black Panther was renamed AVIC Shenyang Aircraft Co., Ltd., and 100% of the equity of AVIC Shenyang Aircraft Industry (Group) Co., Ltd. was injected into AVIC Shenyang Aircraft Co., Ltd. in the same year.

On September 29, 2020, the signing ceremony of BAIC Black Panther's equity delivery and debt restructuring was held in Nanjing. BAIC Black Panther became a wholly owned subsidiary of Wendeng State Investment; on November 10 of the same year, Shandong Heavy Industry Group launched a comprehensive acquisition of Black Panther Automobile Strategic Reorganization Plan.

== Products ==
- EV 2002
- EV 2003 (LSV) (sold in the US as the ZAP Worldcar)

== See also ==
- List of automobile manufacturers of China
