= Vencer =

Dutch manufacturer of sports cars

- Industry: Automotive
- Founded: 2010
- Founder: Robert Cobben
- Headquarters: Vriezenveen, Netherlands
- Products: Automobiles
- Website: www.vencer.nl

Vencer is a Dutch manufacturer of sports cars. It was founded in 2010 by Robert Cobben. Their current lineup includes the Vencer Sarthe. The hand-built 2015 Sarthe retails from €270,882 and is only available in Europe.
