= Keraboss Super K =

Automobile

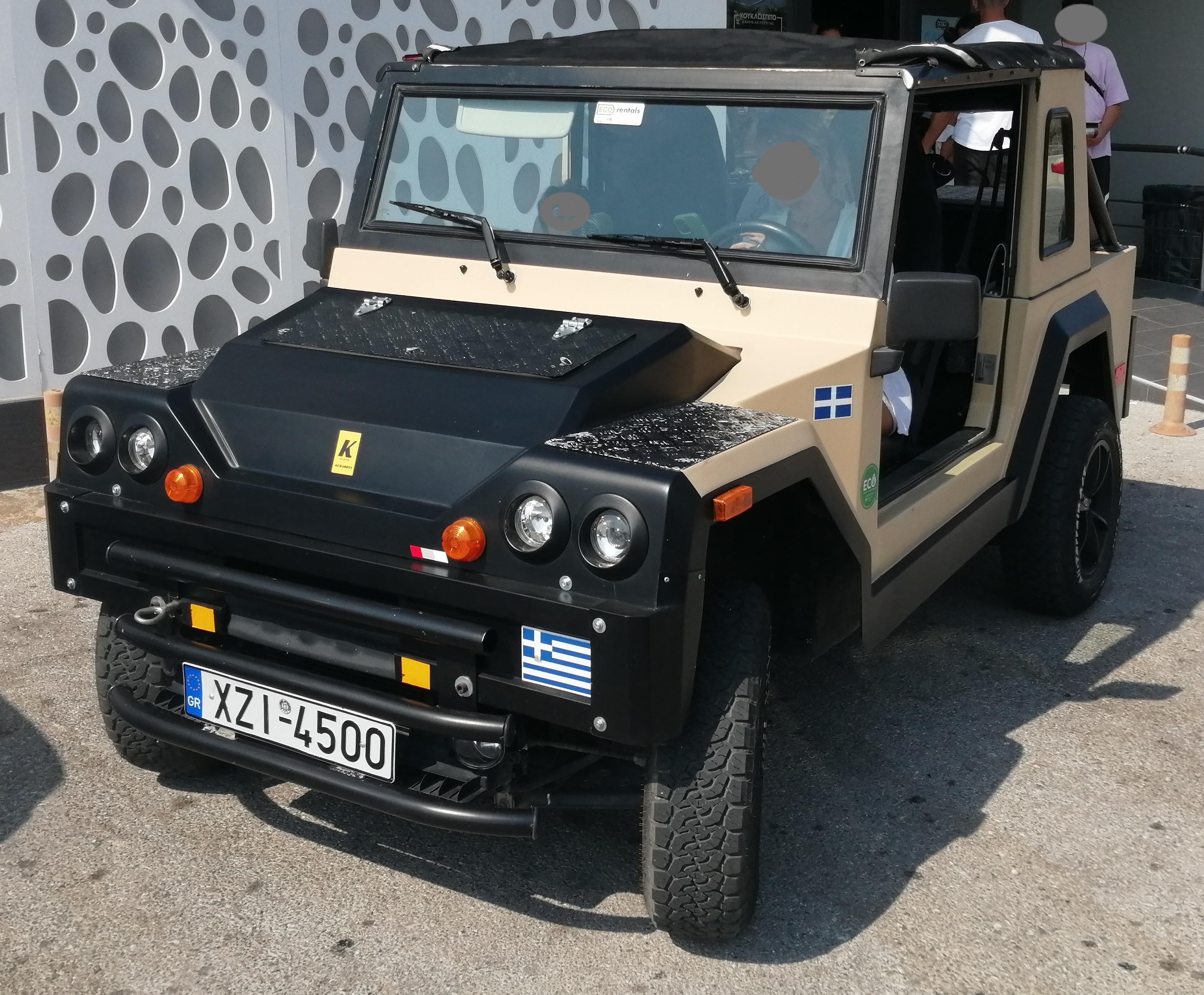
- Keraboss Super K

Overview
- Manufacturer: Keraboss cars manufacturing
- Production: 2011–present
- Assembly: Athens, Greece,

Powertrain
- Engine: gasoline: 999 cc Mitsubishi
- Transmission: Automatic, Semi automatic, 5-speed

Dimensions
- Wheelbase: 2150 (mm)
- Length: 3375 (mm)
- Width: 1560 (mm)
- Height: 1590 (mm)

Keraboss Super K is a car designed and produced by Athens-based Keraboss cars manufacturing.

Pavlos Kerabos (company name is spelled as ‘Keraboss') founded Keraboss Design in 1975 (51 years ago), specializing in car conversions (including cabrio and hardtop versions), license production of light jeep-type vehicles, and (later) auto tuning. Development of the Super K model started in 2008, with two cars built in 2011. The car is a light, SUV-type vehicle, and received type certification in 2021. Series production of a modernized version started in June 2022, with first export (to France) reported in December 2022.

In some (mostly popular) media it is often stated that the Keraboss Super K was the "first Greek car to achieve state certification" (and, thus, issuance of license plates based on Greek certification), which is an erroneous statement as this was also the case for other Greek cars previously produced.
