= DDR Motorsport =

Sports car

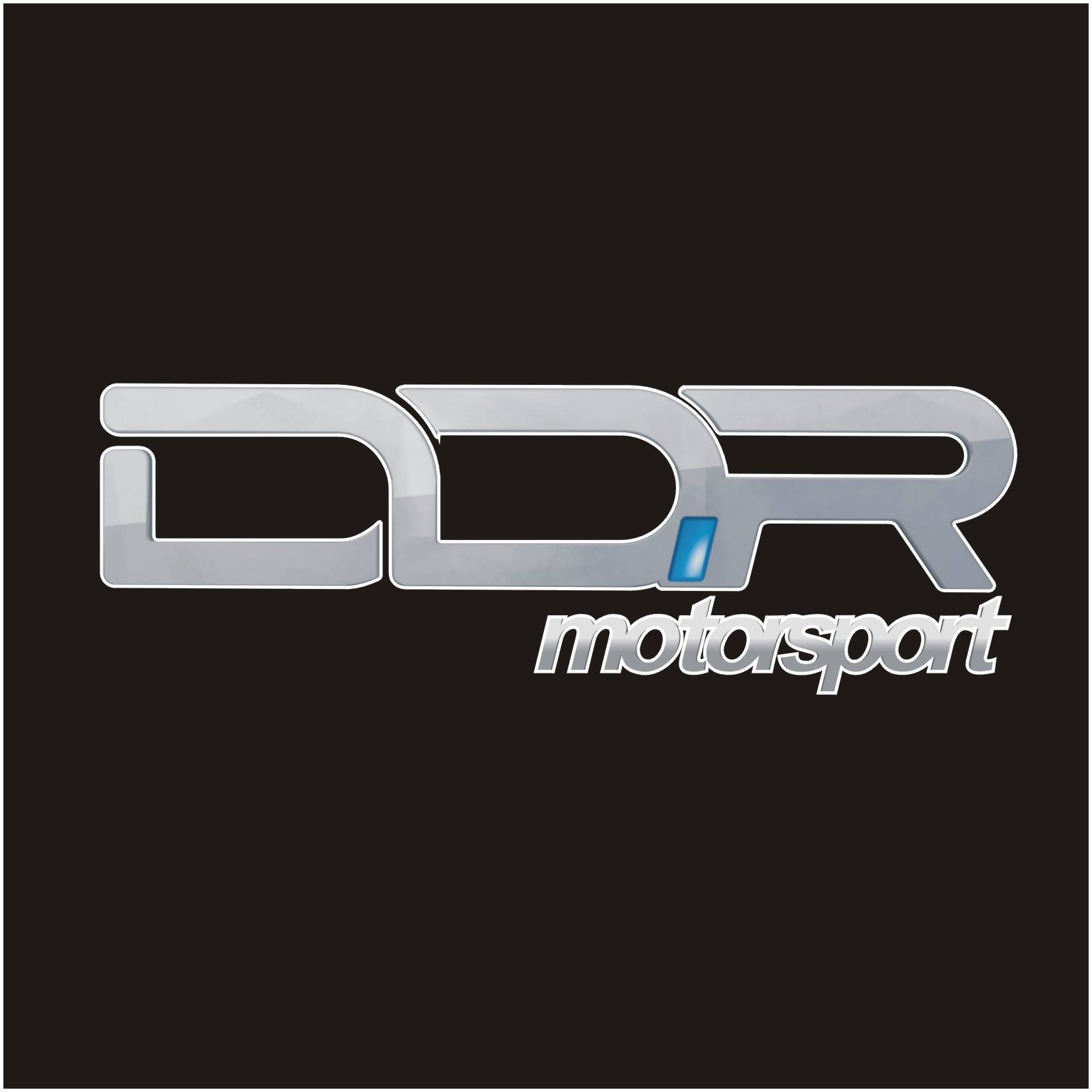
- Industry: Automotive
- Founded: 2001
- Founder: Diego Grullón
- Headquarters: Miami, Florida, United States
- Products: sports cars
- Website: ddrmotorsport.com

The Grullon GT is a sports car manufactured by DDR Motorsport Miami Inc. in Miami, Florida, United States. The design is mid engined, rear wheel drive layout, with a tubular steel space frame chassis and composite body.

DDR Motorsport was founded in 2001 by Diego Grullón. DDR made his debut launching the DDR SP4 "Sport Prototype 4 cylinder" at the 2005 Knott's Berry Farm kit car show in California.

The two main models are the Miami GT8 "Gran Turismo 8 Cylinder", which is powered by a Corvette's GM LS-series engine and uses either a Porsche G50, G96 or Audi 5000 transaxle, and the GT4 "Gran Turismo 4 cylinder", powered by the Toyota 2.0 liter turbo 3S-GTE engine used in the SW-20 Toyota MR2.

There are 2 models by special order. The SP-RE "Sport Prototype Rotary Engine" with a Mazda RX-7 engine, using a Porsche G50 transaxle coupled with a KEP adaptor plate. The other model is the DDR SP-BE "DDR Sport Prototype Boxer Engine" using a Subaru engine and transaxle.

The cars manufactured by DDR Motorsport are primarily sold as components. Turnkeys are available from DDR too, although built by third parties.
