= Magnum Cars =

Canadian sports car manufacturer

Magnum Cars is a Canadian company that manufactures sports cars and racing cars. It was established in 1968. Magnum built two Formula Ford cars for Gilles Villeneuve. Certain models are licensed for street use under an exception, that permits low-volume manufactures to produce fewer than 20 cars per year.

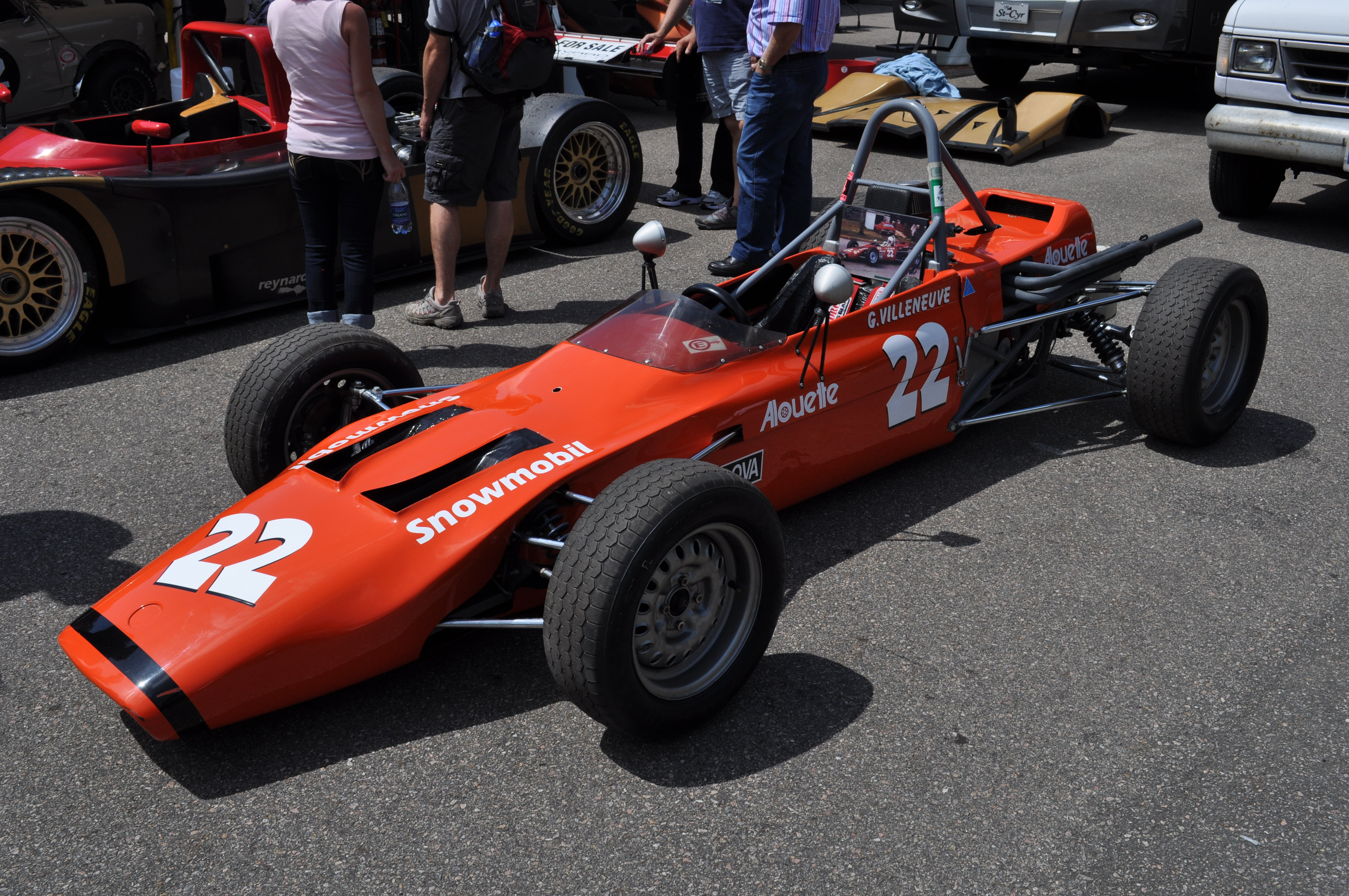
Villeneuve's 1973 Magnum Cars MkIII Formula Ford car, with which he won the Quebec Formula Ford championship.
