= Quantum Motors =

Industrias Quantum Motors SA
- Industry: Automotive
- Founded: 2017
- Founder: José Carlos Márquez and Carlos Suroco Deiters
- Headquarters: Cochabamba, Bolivia
- Area served: Bolivia; Peru; Paraguay; Mexico; El Salvador
- Products: electric cars tricycle cars motor scooters scooters electric bikes electric tricycles
- Website: tuquantum.com

Industrias Quantum Motors SA is a vehicle manufacturing company based in Cochabamba, Bolivia and founded by José Carlos Márquez and Carlos Suroco Deiters in 2010. The company originally made mini electric dump trucks for the mining industry. It also makes motorcycles and bicycles.

== Electric cars ==
The company obtained a license to manufacture a small Chinese electric car, very similar in shape to the Henan Camp Industrial Co Ltd Robeta electric car, which Quantum adapted to suit Latin American conditions. The cars were first manufactured in Bolivia in 2019 with 60% imported components and 40% local. The E2 and E3 models can fit up to three passengers and have a maximum speed of 55 km/h (34 mph).

The company has expanded its operations into Peru, Paraguay, Mexico and El Salvador. Agreement was reached with the Mexican government in 2022 for Quantum to manufacture its new E4 model there for the Mexican market. Quantum is working with the Mexican company Potencia Industrial SA de CV.

In Peru, Quantum marketed the Colibri, a three-wheel electric vehicle. Quantum began operations in El Salvador in 2021 and announced it was going to build a factory there in 2022 producing the E5 model.

In 2022 Quantum began discussions with the Cuban government about the possibility of supply its electric vehicles and other products. These discussions were ongoing in 2023 with Quantum intending to show its products at the 10th Latin American Integration Association (ExpoAladi-2023) in Havana.

By 2023 the company had sold about 350 cars in Bolivia, but was finding it difficult to compete against the fuel subsidized fossil fuel vehicles.

== Models ==
Electric cars

- E2 production commenced 2019 - no longer in production
- E3 production commenced 2019 - no longer in production
- E4 production commenced 2020
- E4+ (or E4 mountaineer) production commenced 2020
- E5 production commenced 2022

Tricycle car/motor scooter

- Colibri
- Duk-E - cargo carrier

Motor scooter

- Yuki

Scooter

- SK!

Electric Bikes

- Ara
- Condor
- Tuki

Electric tricycle

- Multi bike

== Batteries ==
One of the challenges for Quantum was obtaining low cost lithium batteries. Up until 2022 when it established Quantum Batteries it had to rely on China for its supply.

== Electric bikes ==
Quantum has partnered with the Chinese Company Yadea, who makes electric bikes that are imported by Quantum. Quantum also markets Super Soco electric bikes under licence.
