= Trion Supercars =

American car manufacturer

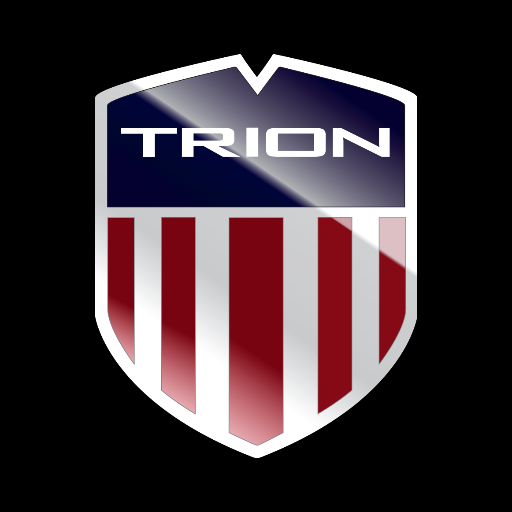
- Type: Private
- Industry: Automotive
- Founded: May 7, 2012
- Founder: Richard Patterson
- Headquarters: Orange County, California, U.S.
- Key people: Richard Patterson (CEO)
- Products: Sports cars
- Website: www.triondemo.com

Trion Supercars is an American private automotive company based in Las Vegas. It was founded in 2012 by American automotive engineer Richard Patterson. The company has been developing the "Nemesis", which was originally scheduled to be their first produced vehicle sold to the public. The Nemesis is developed to be offered in several different variations, with the highest trim having up to 2000 horsepower, powered by a 552 cubic inch (9045ccm) quad-cam V8.

== History ==
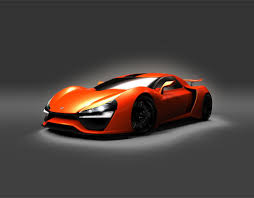
Trion Nemesis

In July 2015, Trion first unveiled the Nemesis as a full-scale concept model to the public, along with one of the intended drivetrains. The car was initially intended to enter production in 2018.

In January 2016, the Trion Nemesis RR was unveiled at the Silicon Valley Auto Show. In November 2016, Trion Supercars displayed the Nemesis in the SEMA Show followed by the LA Auto Show.

The Trion Nemesis is planned to be produced as a street legal vehicle, aiming to become the fastest street legal car. Pre-orders in 2016 had a base price of 1.6 million USD.

The Nemesis RR is a mid-engine four wheel drive supercar, powered by a 9.0L twin turbocharged V8 engine capable of producing 2000 hp. Power will be channeled to all four wheels via an eight-speed sequential transmission. The RR will feature all wheel drive, traction management system and 10 speaker JBL sound system.

The Nemesis GT was expected to reach a top speed of 218 mph, accelerate from 0-60 mph in 3.5 seconds, and deliver about 1400 horsepower. The base model started at 1.2 million USD.

As of November 2024 Trion has yet to release a production version of the vehicles as it has previewed and which were under various stages of development, including having presented and shown a full scale mock-up models to the public at various events in recents years.

The corporate entity is still in operation and has announced that it is still in development of a Hypercar, the project now appearing to have evolved and expanded featuring an all-electric drivetrain.
