= Shan Star =

Small light commercial vehicle manufacturer in Taunggyi

Aye Tharyar Mai Tong Industry Co., Ltd
- Industry: Automotive
- Headquarters: Taunggyi, Myanmar
- Area served: Myanmar
- Products: Jeeps and Pickup Trucks

Shan Star (Aye Tharyar Mai Tong Industry Co., Ltd) is a small light commercial vehicle manufacturer in Taunggyi, Shan State, Myanmar. Its products include light jeeps and pick-up trucks.

== External link/Reference ==
- Information in Autoindex
