= Automobili Estrema =

Italian car manufacturer

- Industry: Automotive
- Founded: 2020
- Founders: Gianfranco Pizzuto
- Headquarters: Modena, Emilia-Romagna, Italy
- Area served: Worldwide
- Key people: Gianfranco Pizzuto (founder and CEO)
- Products: hypercars and electric supercars
- Website: fulminea.com

Automobili Estrema is a car manufacturer specialized in the production of electric sports cars founded in 2020 by entrepreneur Gianfranco Pizzuto, former co-founder and financier of Fisker Automotive in 2007.

== Models ==
=== Fulminea ===
Estrema Fulminea
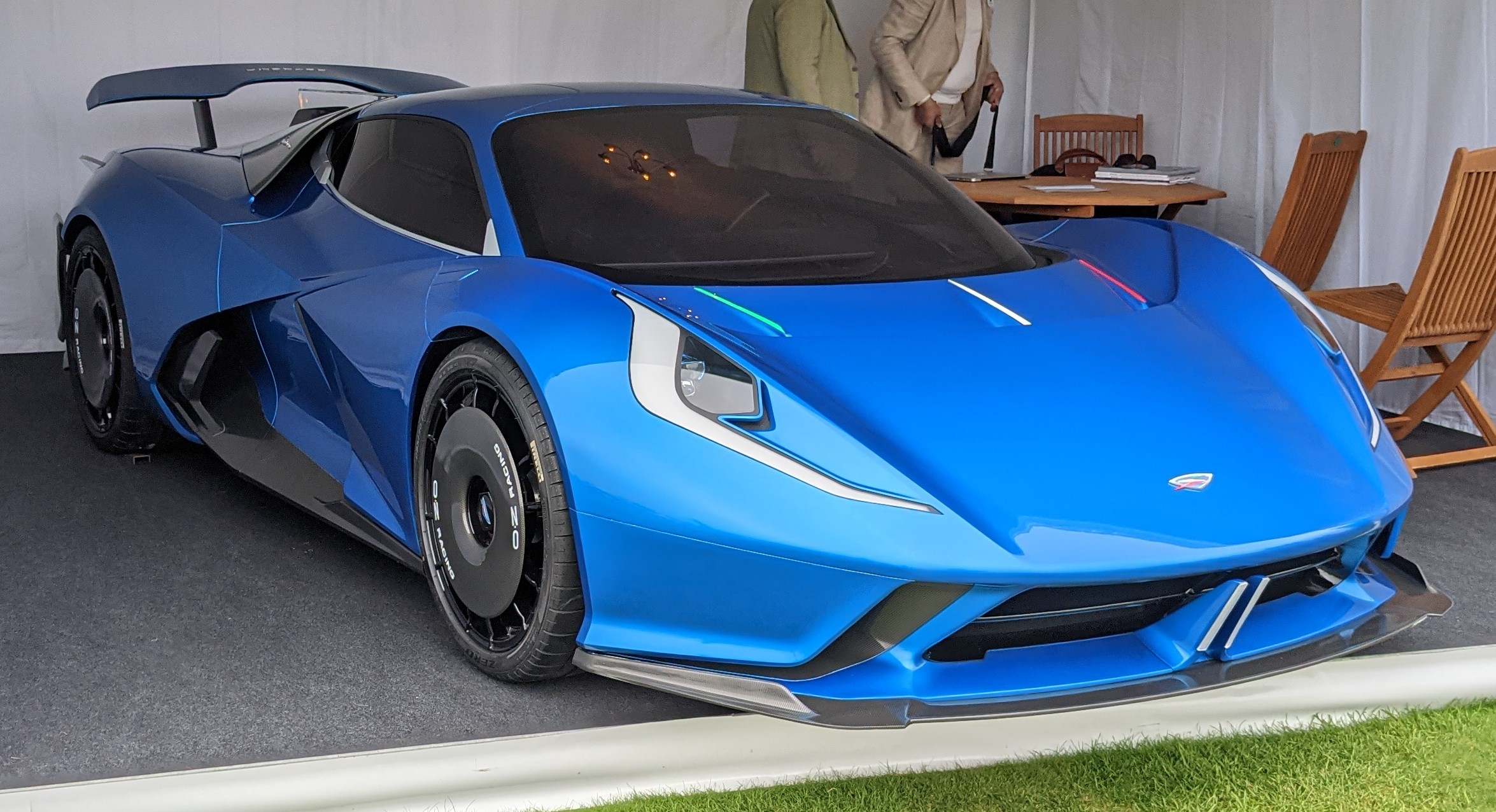

Overview
- Manufacturer: Automobili Estrema
- Production: 2023 (61 units planned)

Body and chassis
- Class: Electric sports car (S)
- Body style: 2-door coupé

Powertrain
- Battery: Hybrid Battery Pack which uses a combination of ABEE’s (Avesta Battery Energy Engineering) solid state cells paired with ultra-capacitors.
- Electric range: 520 km

Dimensions
- Length: 4,683 mm
- Width: 2,052 mm
- Height: 1,148 mm
- Curb weight: 1,500 kg

The car was publicly unveiled at Turin Automobile Museum on May 13, 2021.
