= Tushek =

Austrian-Slovenian vehicle manufacturer

Tushek & Spigel Supercars GmbH
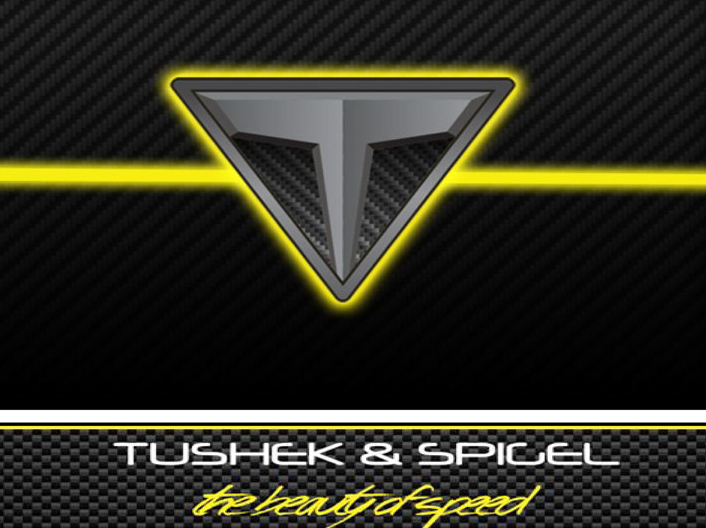
- Industry: Automotive
- Founded: 2012
- Founder: Aljosa Tushek, Jacob Carl Spigel
- Headquarters: Graz, Styria, Austria
- Key people: Aljoša Tushek (founder and CEO); Vili Pustonik (COO); Dragos Gheorghiu (CCO)
- Products: Super Sport Cars

Tushek & Spigel Supercars GmbH is an Austrian-Slovenian manufacturer of supercars, founded in Slovenia under the name 'Tushek' and based in Graz, Austria, at a former military airport which included a private racetrack that is used for testing. The company was founded by Aljoša Tushek and Jacob Carl Spigel.

== Description ==
Supercar startup Tushek, founded by Slovenian racing driver Aljoša Tushek, started in 2012 when it unveiled the Renovatio T500 at the Top Marques Monaco. Dissatisfied with the insufficient speed of his Porsche 911 racing car, he took the Slovak K-1 Attack (sk) assembly kit as the basis for creating his own sports car. In 2011, the Tushek Supercars brand was founded. The first car assembled by the company was called the Renovatio T500. Since then, Tushek relocated from Slovenia to Austria, and rebranded itself Tushek & Spigel. 80% of the Renovatio is completely self-assembled by the Slovenian manufacturer. 30 cars of this model were assembled, and were sold at a price of €300,000.

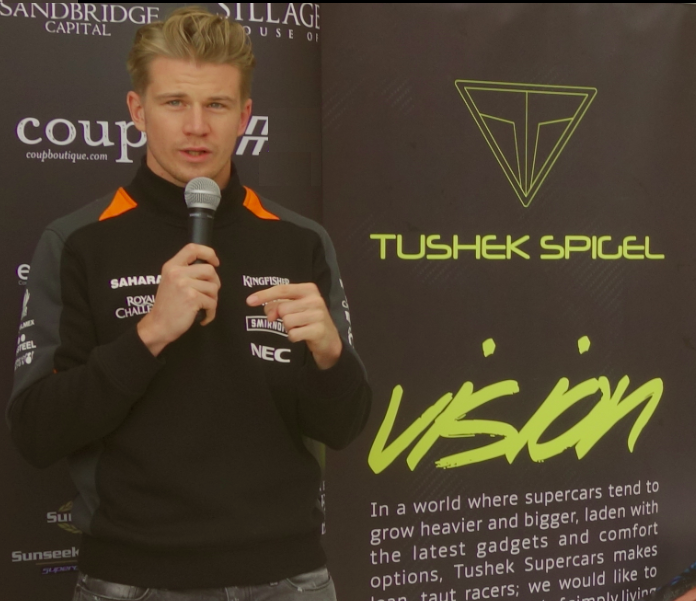
Nico Hülkenberg - Tushek Spigel

In 2013, Tushek Supercars announced plans to create a new sports car, the Forego T700.

During the 2014 Top Marques Monaco, Tushek & Spigel presented a new model, the Tushek TS 600. The company also presented a new model, the Tushek TS 900 Apex, during the 2018 Top Marques Monaco.

All cars are assembled by hand to order.

== Models ==
- Tushek TS 500 (2012)
- Tushek TS 600 (2014)
- Tushek TS 900 Racer Pro (~2016)
- Tushek TS 900 Apex (2018)
- Tushek Aeon E (2023)
- Tushek Aeon H (2024)
- Tushek Aeon R (2026)

TS 500	TS 600-PISTA	TS 600-STRADA
TS 500	TS 600	Tushek-spigel TS 600
