= Industry in Turkey =

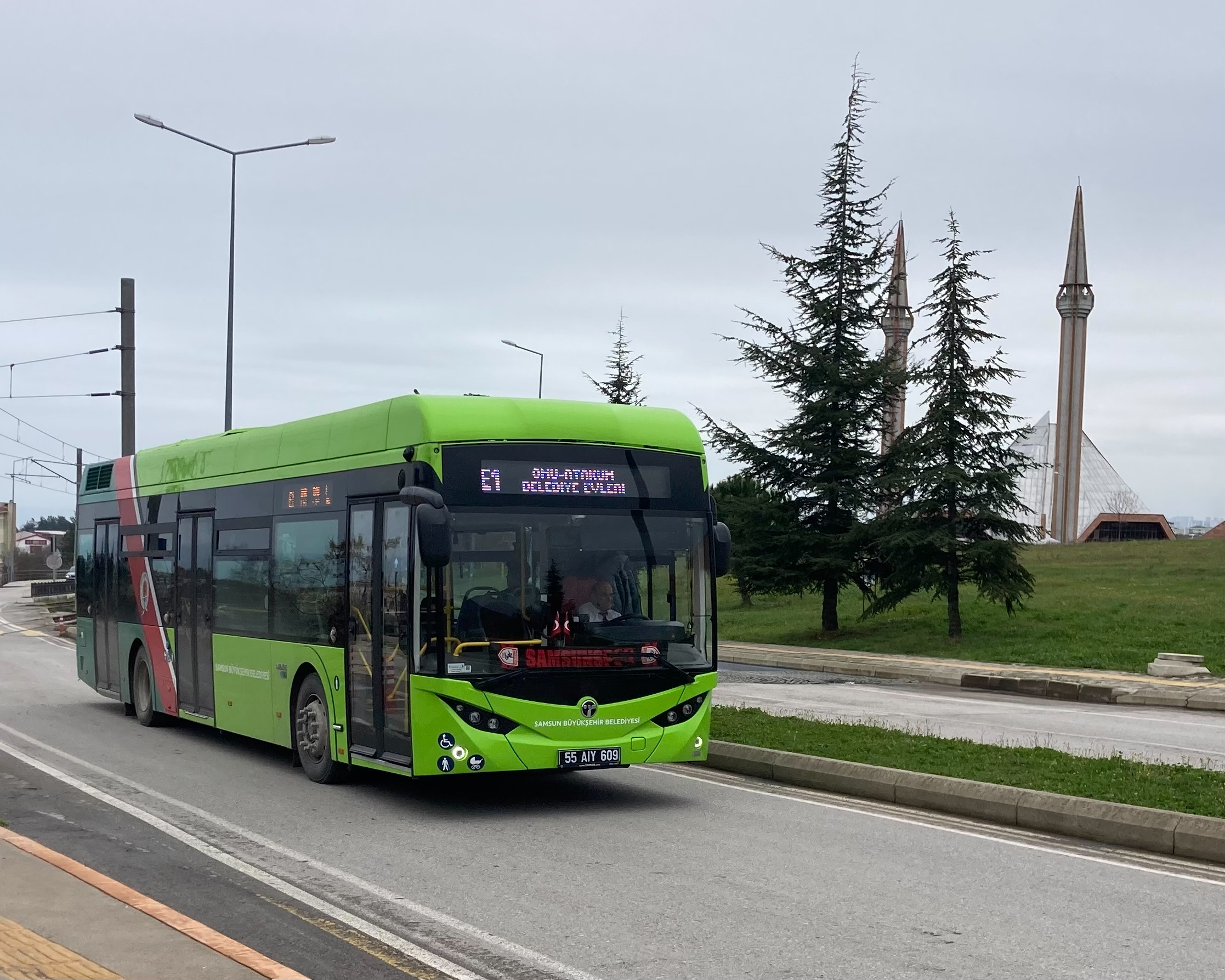
Electric vehicles such as buses are manufactured

Industry is about a quarter of the economy of Turkey, and is mostly manufacturing. Heavy industry is tending to move out of the EU due to Turkey's laxer pollution regulations and cheaper energy. However, there are concerns about authoritarianism in the government of Turkey and lack of progress in decarbonisation.

== Consumer electronics and home appliances ==
Turkey's Vestel is the largest TV producer in Europe, accounting for a quarter of all TV sets manufactured and sold on the continent in 2006. By January 2005, Vestel and its rival Turkish electronics and white goods brand Beko accounted for more than half of all TV sets manufactured in Europe.

== Textiles and clothing ==
Turkey is the world's fifth-largest exporter of textiles, accounting for 10% of the country's GDP and employing 750 000 people in 2018. Turkish companies made clothing exports worth $13.98 billion in 2006; more than $10.67 billion of which (76.33%) were exported to the European Union.

== Motor vehicles and automotive products ==
The automotive industry in Turkey, which plays an important role in the manufacturing sector of the Turkish economy, produced 1,352,648 motor vehicles in 2022, ranking as the 13th largest producer in the world (production peaked at 1,695,731 motor vehicles in 2017, when Turkey also ranked 13th). Turkish automotive companies like TEMSA, Otokar and BMC are among the world's largest van, bus and truck manufacturers. Togg, or Turkey's Automobile Joint Venture Group Inc. is the first all-electric vehicle company of Turkey.

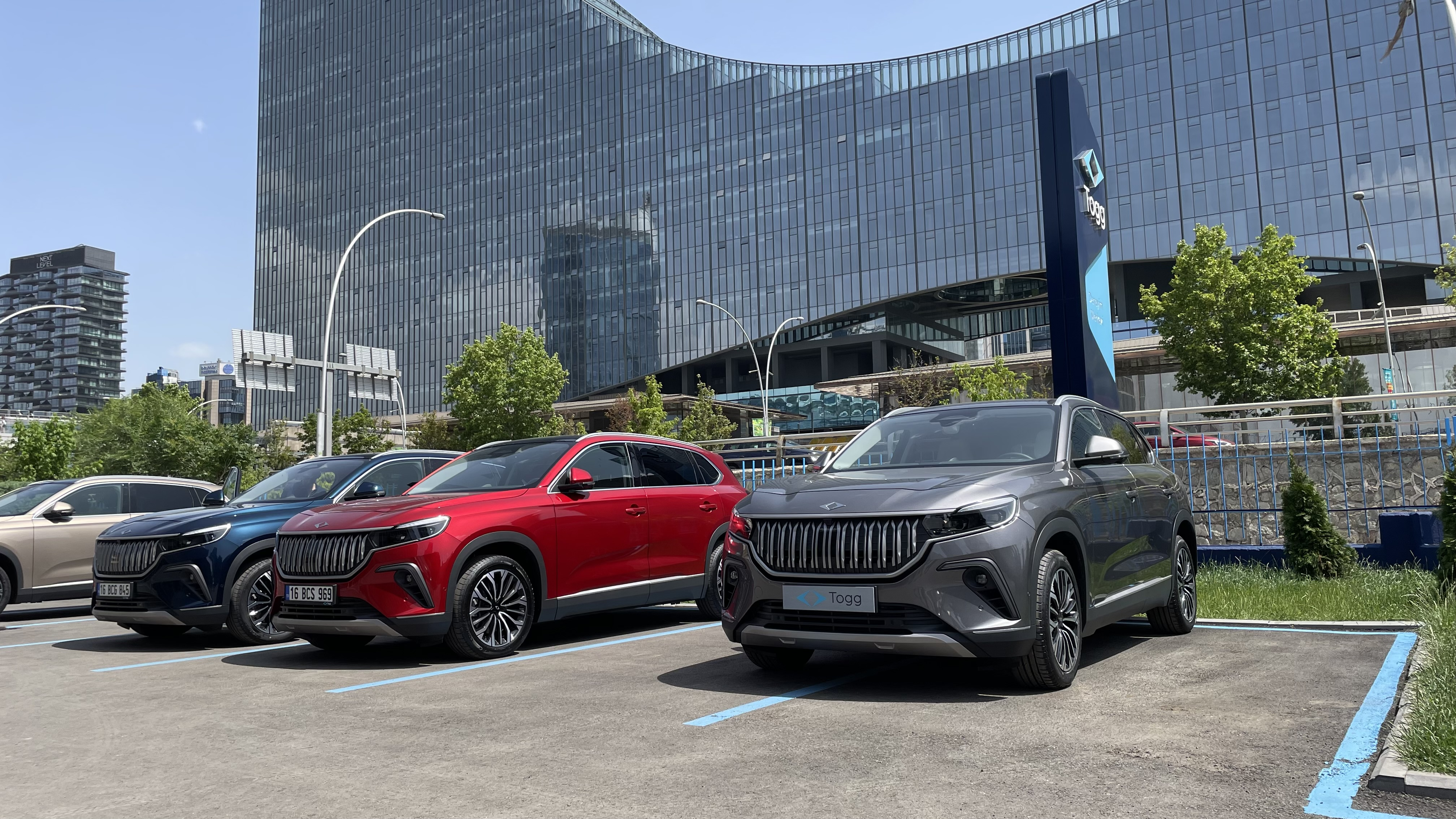
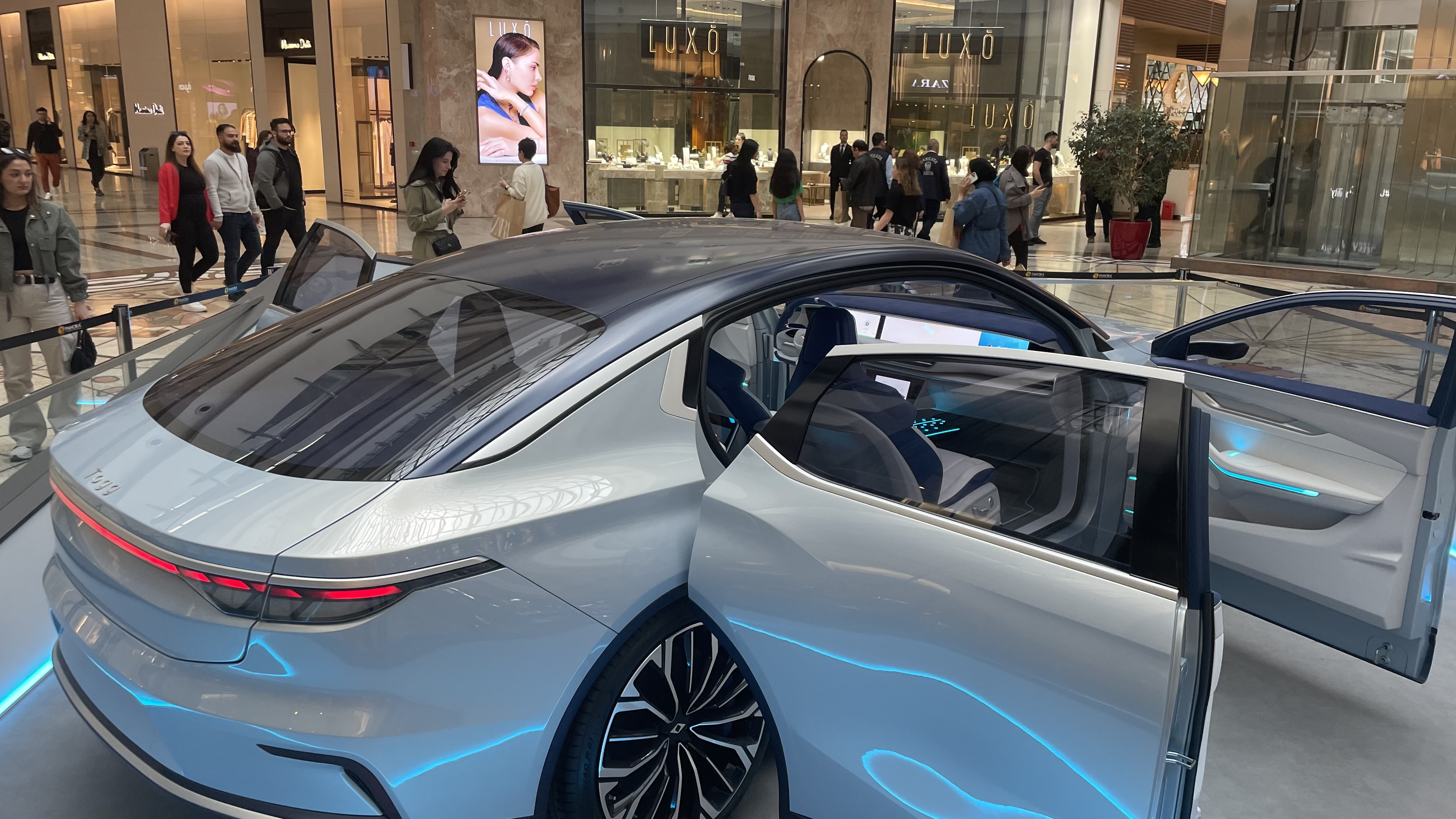
Togg T10X SUV and Togg T10F sedan produced by Togg, a Turkish automotive company which manufactures EVs

The automotive industry is an important part of the economy since the late 1960s. The companies that operate in the sector are mainly located in the Marmara Region. With a cluster of car-makers and parts suppliers, the Turkish automotive sector has become an integral part of the global network of production bases, exporting over $22.94 billion worth of motor vehicles and components in 2008.

Global car manufacturers with production plants include Fiat/Tofaş, Oyak-Renault, Hyundai, Toyota, Honda and Ford/Otosan. Turkish automotive companies like TEMSA, Otokar and BMC are among the world's largest van, bus and truck manufacturers. Togg is a new Turkish automotive company established in 2018 for producing EVs. Togg's factory in Gemlik, Bursa Province, was inaugurated on 29 October 2022, the 99th anniversary of the Turkish Republic.

Turkey's annual auto exports, including trucks and buses, surpassed 1 million units for the first time in 2016 as foreign automakers' investment in new models and a recovery in its mainstay European market lifted shipments. According to the industry group Automotive Manufacturers Association (OSD), Turkey-based car plants exported 1.14 million units in 2016, up 15% from the year before. Auto exports hit a record high for the fourth straight year. Production grew 9% year on year in 2016 to 1.48 million units, setting a new record for the second consecutive year. Nearly 80% of vehicles produced in Turkey were exported.

== Multiple unit trains, locomotives and wagons ==
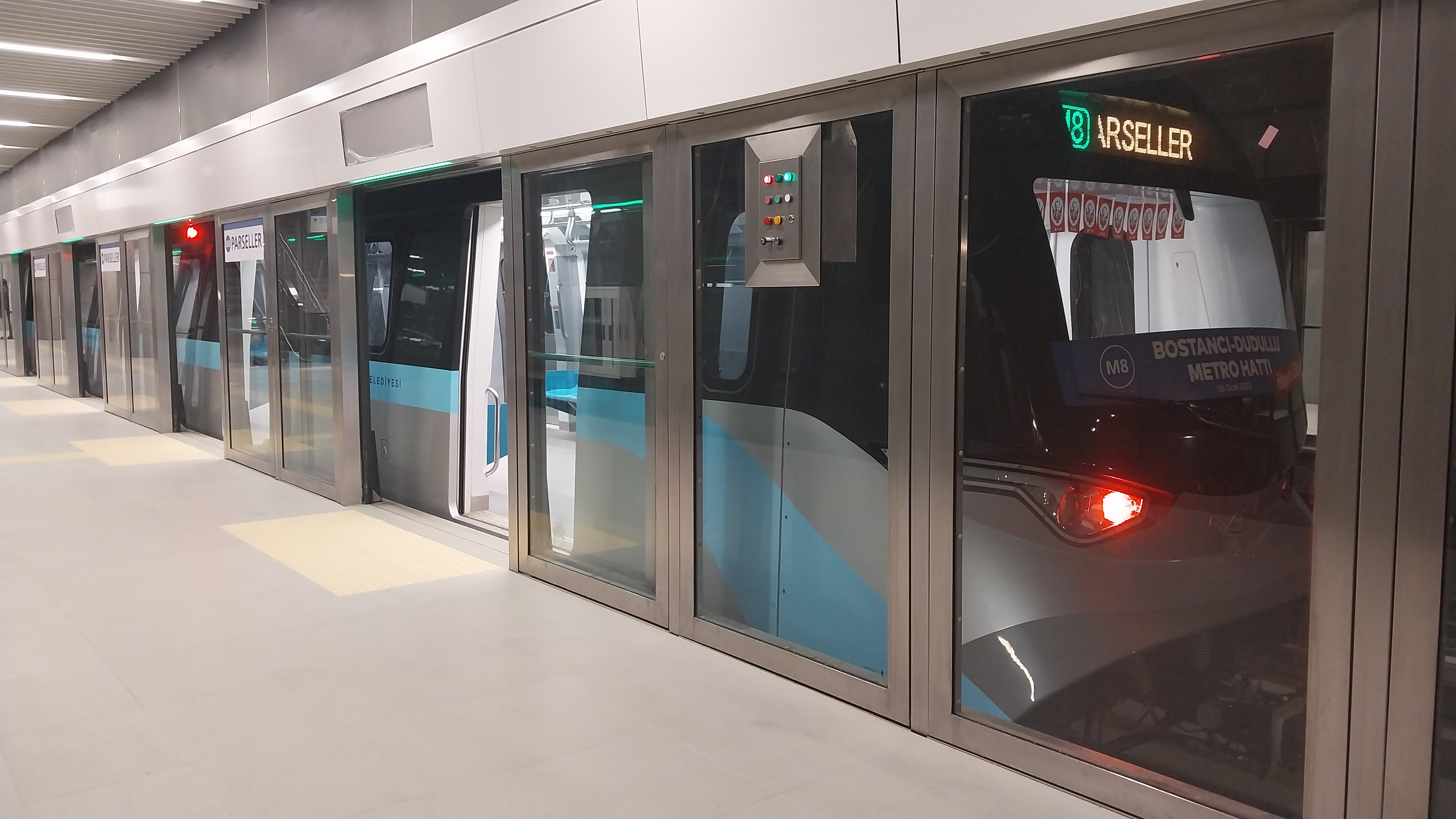
Istanbul Metro's M8 line is among the new lines with fully automated driverless trains and platform screen doors for increasing passenger safety.

TÜLOMSAŞ (1894), TÜVASAŞ (1951) and EUROTEM (2006) are among the major producers of multiple unit trains, locomotives and wagons in Turkey, including high-speed EMU and DMU models.

Bozankaya is a Turkish manufacturer of rolling stock including metro, tram and trolleybus vehicles in Ankara.

== Defense industry ==
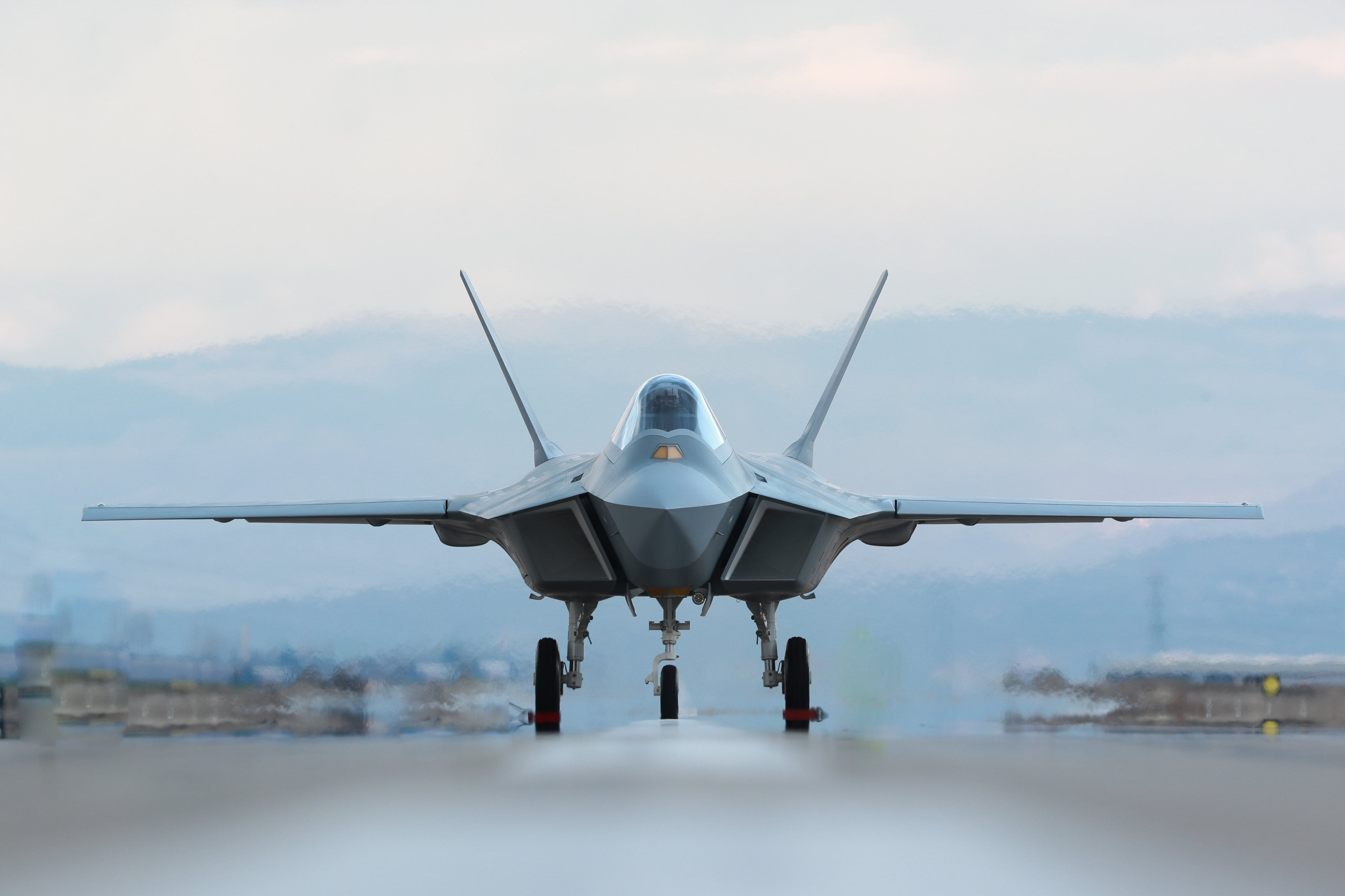
The TAI TF Kaan, a twin engine fifth generation air superiority fighter, completed its maiden flight on February 21, 2024. TAI Anka-3, a flying wing type stealth UCAV, completed its maiden flight on December 28, 2023.

Turkey has many modern armament manufacturers. Annual exports reached $1.6 billion in 2014. MKEK, TAI, Aselsan, Roketsan, FNSS, Nurol Makina, Otokar, and Havelsan are major manufacturers. On 11 July 2002, Turkey became a Level 3 partner of the F-35 Joint Strike Fighter (JSF) development program. TAI builds various aircraft types and models, such as the F-16 Fighting Falcon for the Turkish Air Force. Turkey has recently launched domestically built new military/intelligence satellites including a 0.8m resolution reconnaissance satellite (Project Göktürk-1) for use by the Turkish Armed Forces and a 2m resolution reconnaissance satellite (Project Göktürk-2) for use by the Turkish National Intelligence Organization.

Other important products include the TAI TF Kaan stealth air superiority fighter, Tepe-class destroyer, Istanbul-class frigate, Ada-class corvette, Atılay-class submarine, TAI Anka-3 flying wing type stealth UCAV, Baykar MIUS Kızılelma UCAV, Baykar Akıncı HALE UCAV, Baykar Bayraktar TB2 MALE UCAV, Baykar Bayraktar TB3 carrier-based MALE UCAV, TAI Aksungur MALE UCAV, TAI Anka MALE UAV/UCAV, Aselsan İzci UGV, Altay main battle tank, T-155 Fırtına self-propelled howitzer, J-600T missile, T-129 attack helicopter, A400M, Roketsan UMTAS anti-tank missile, Roketsan Cirit laser-guided rocket, Panter howitzer, ACV-300, Otokar Cobra and Akrep, BMC Kirpi, FNSS Pars 6x6 and 8x8 APC, Nurol Ejder 6x6 APC, TOROS artillery rocket system, Bayraktar Mini UAV, ASELPOD, and SOM cruise missile.

== Steel-Iron industry ==
Turkey ranks 8th in the list of countries by steel production. In 2013, total steel production was 35.134 million tonnes. Turkey's crude steel production reached a record high of 34.1 million tons in 2011. Notable producers (above 2 million tonnes) and their ranks among top steel producing companies.

- Erdemir (7.1 million tonnes) (47th) (Only Erdemir-Turkey; Erdemir-Romania is not included)
- Habaş (4.4 million tonnes) (72nd)
- İçdaş (3.6 million tonnes) (76th)
- Diler (2.3 million tonnes) (108th)
- Çolakoğlu (2.1 million tonnes) (110th)

== Construction and contracting sector ==
The Turkish construction and contracting industry is made up of a large number of businesses. In 2016 a total of 39 Turkish construction and contracting companies were listed in the Top 250 International Contractors List prepared by the Engineering News-Record. From the beginning of the 1970s to the end of 2022, Turkish contractors have completed more than 11,605 projects in 133 countries. Their business volume abroad has reached 472 billion US Dollars in 2022.

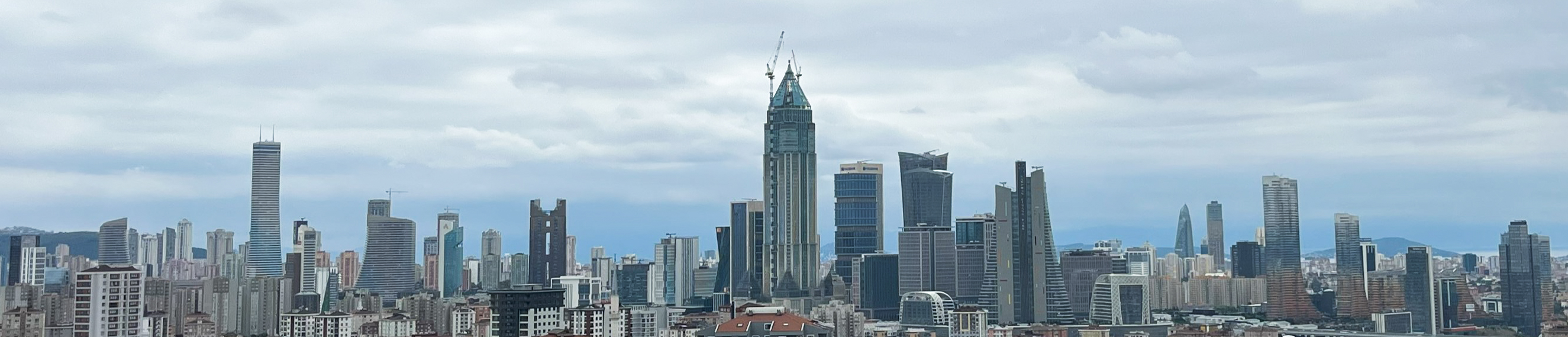
IFC and the skyline of Ataşehir district on the Asian side of Istanbul. The construction sector plays an important role in Turkey's economy.

As Turkey is prone to strong earthquakes, the buildings that were constructed before the post-1999 safety standards and regulations remain a major concern, with many ongoing urban redevelopment and reconstruction projects, especially in large cities. In 2019, an amnesty plan to register illegally constructed buildings for generating extra tax revenues to the government brought in $3.1 billion, but the plan was criticized for ignoring safety issues. The two major earthquakes on 6 February 2023 in southern Turkey have revealed that some of the recently built structures that collapsed were not constructed in accordance with the latest safety regulations.
