= Automotive industry in Turkey =

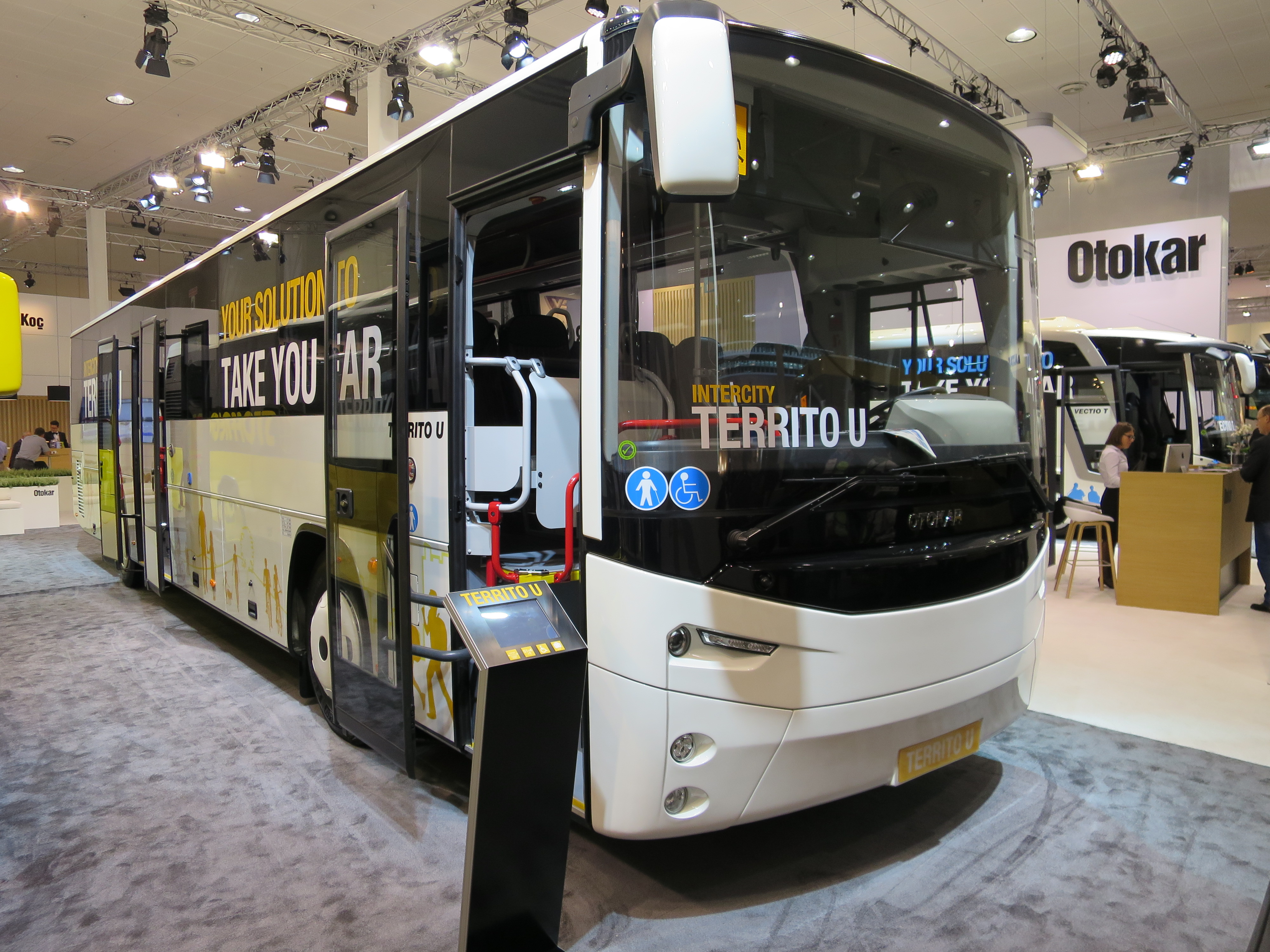
Turkish automotive companies like TEMSA, Otokar and BMC are among the world's largest van, bus and truck manufacturers.

The automotive industry in Turkey plays an important role in the manufacturing sector of the Turkish economy. The companies operating in the Turkish automotive sector are mainly located in the Marmara region, especially Bursa.

In 2023, Turkey produced 1,486,393 motor vehicles, ranking as the 13th largest producer in the world (production peaked at 1,695,731 motor vehicles in 2017, when Turkey also ranked 13th). Turkish automotive companies like TEMSA, Otokar and BMC are among the world's largest van, bus and truck manufacturers. Togg, or Turkey's Automobile Joint Venture Group Inc. is the first all-electric vehicle company of Turkey. With a cluster of car-makers and parts suppliers, the Turkish automotive sector has become an integral part of the global network of production bases, exporting more than $35 billion worth of motor vehicles and components. In 2017, nearly 85% of exports went to Europe. Global car manufacturers with production plants include Tofaş, Oyak-Renault, Hyundai Assan Otomotiv, Toyota Motor Manufacturing Turkey, Ford Otosan.

The foundations of the industry were laid in the 1950s when TOE (Türk Otomotiv Endüstrileri A.Ş.) started producing REO military truck and later trucks by International Harvester. A brief foray in car production was stopped short. In 1961 the first indigenously designed domestic passenger car Devrim was made by train manufacturer TCDD. With the establishment of the Otosan assembly factory in 1959, mass production of the domestic car Anadol started in 1966 followed by the mass production of Renault 12 by Renault-Oyak joint venture Mais in 1969.

== History ==
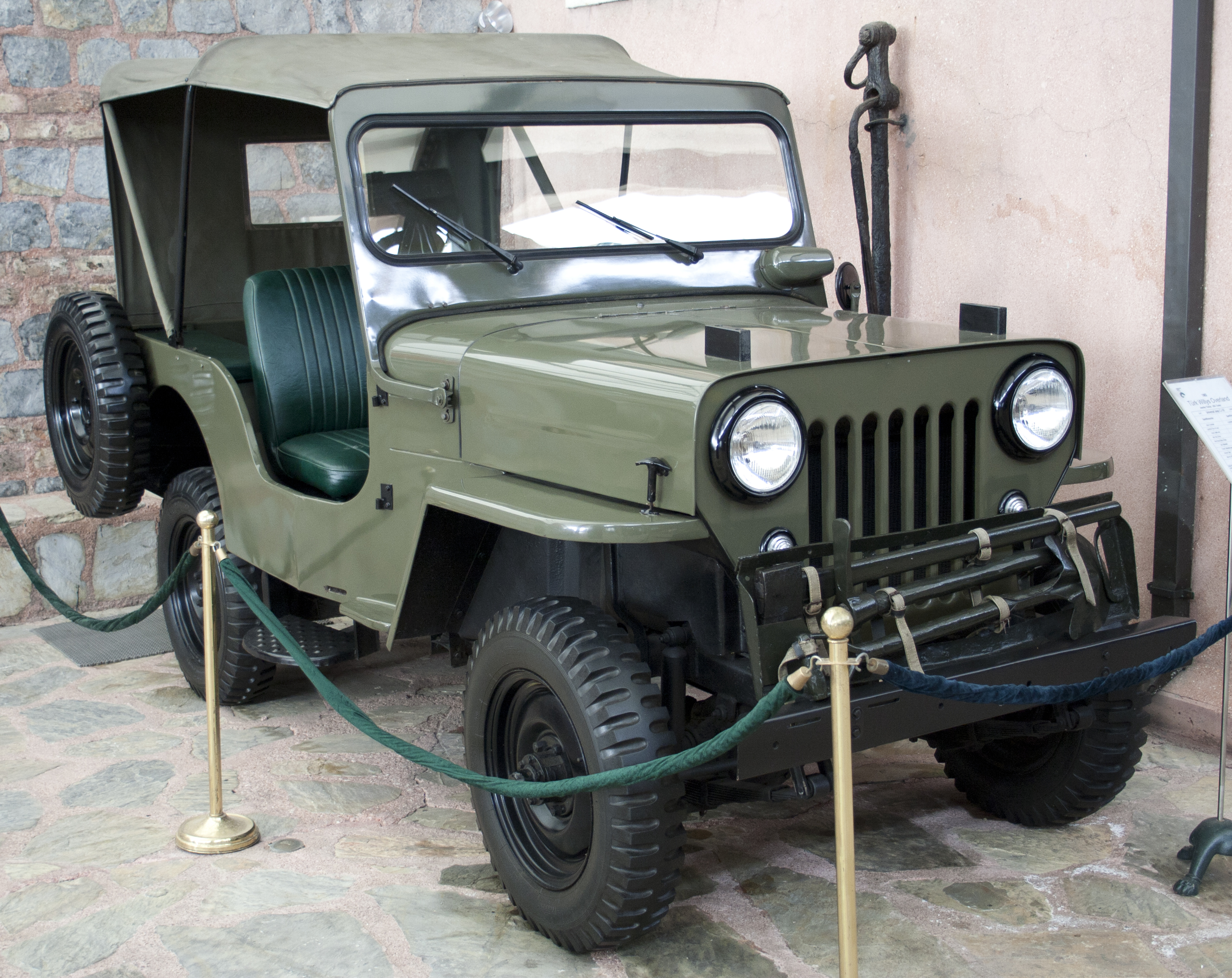
A Türk Willys Overland CJ-3B on display at the Rahmi M. Koç Museum

On 15 August 1925 the Turkish Aircraft, Automobile and Engine Limited Company (Tayyare Otomobil Türk Anonim Şirketi, TOMTAŞ) factory was founded in Turkey.

In 1929 the first car was assembled in Istanbul by Ford Motor Company. 48 cars were produced daily. However, production ended due to the Great Depression of the 1930s.

In 1954 the Jeep factory was established for the production of Turkey's Willys-Overland vehicles in Tuzla, Turkey.

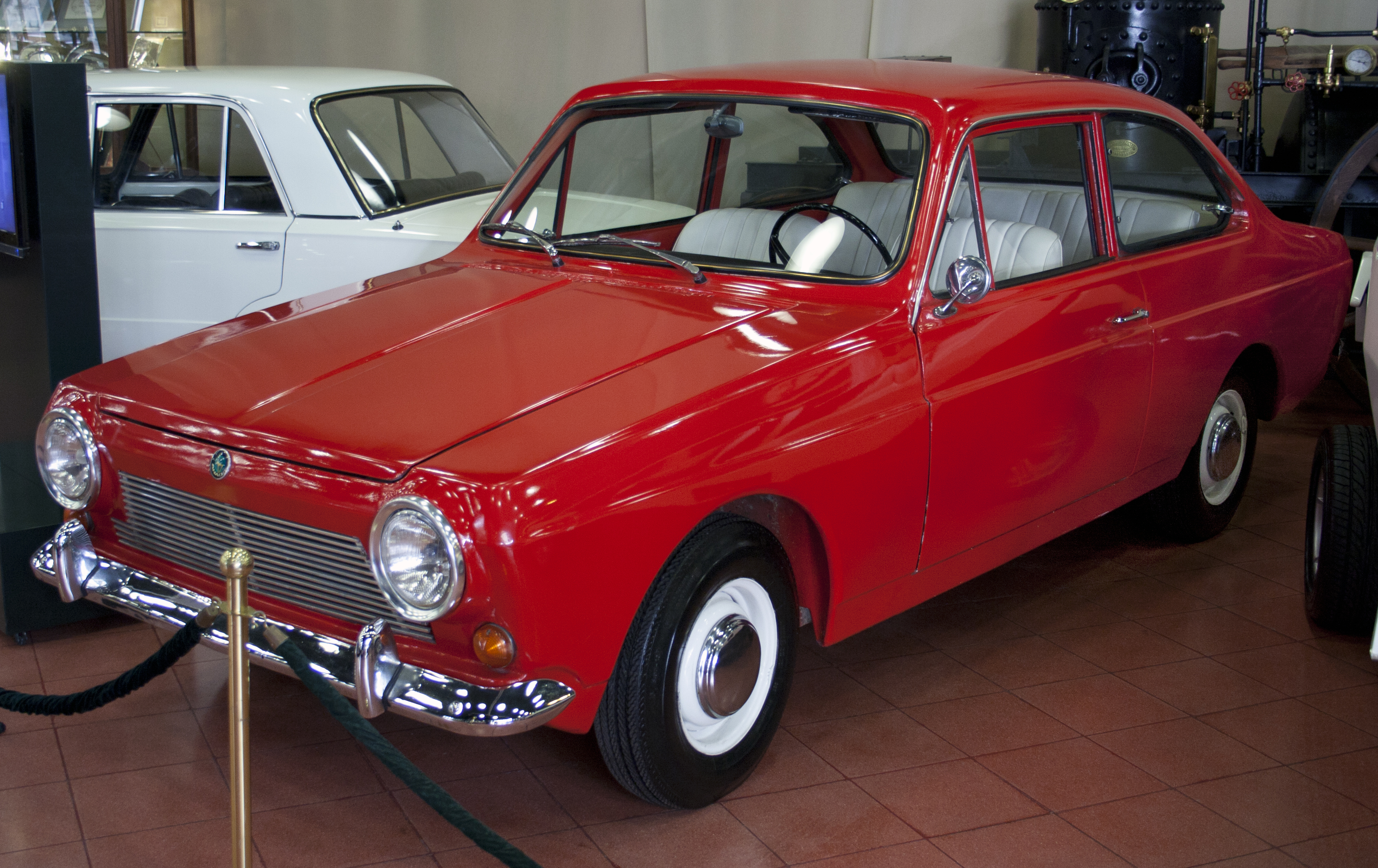
Anadol A1 (manufactured at Ford Otosan)

In 1959 the Otosan factory was established in Istanbul to produce the models of the Ford Motor Company under licence in Turkey. Production of the Ford Consul at the Otosan factory began in 1960.

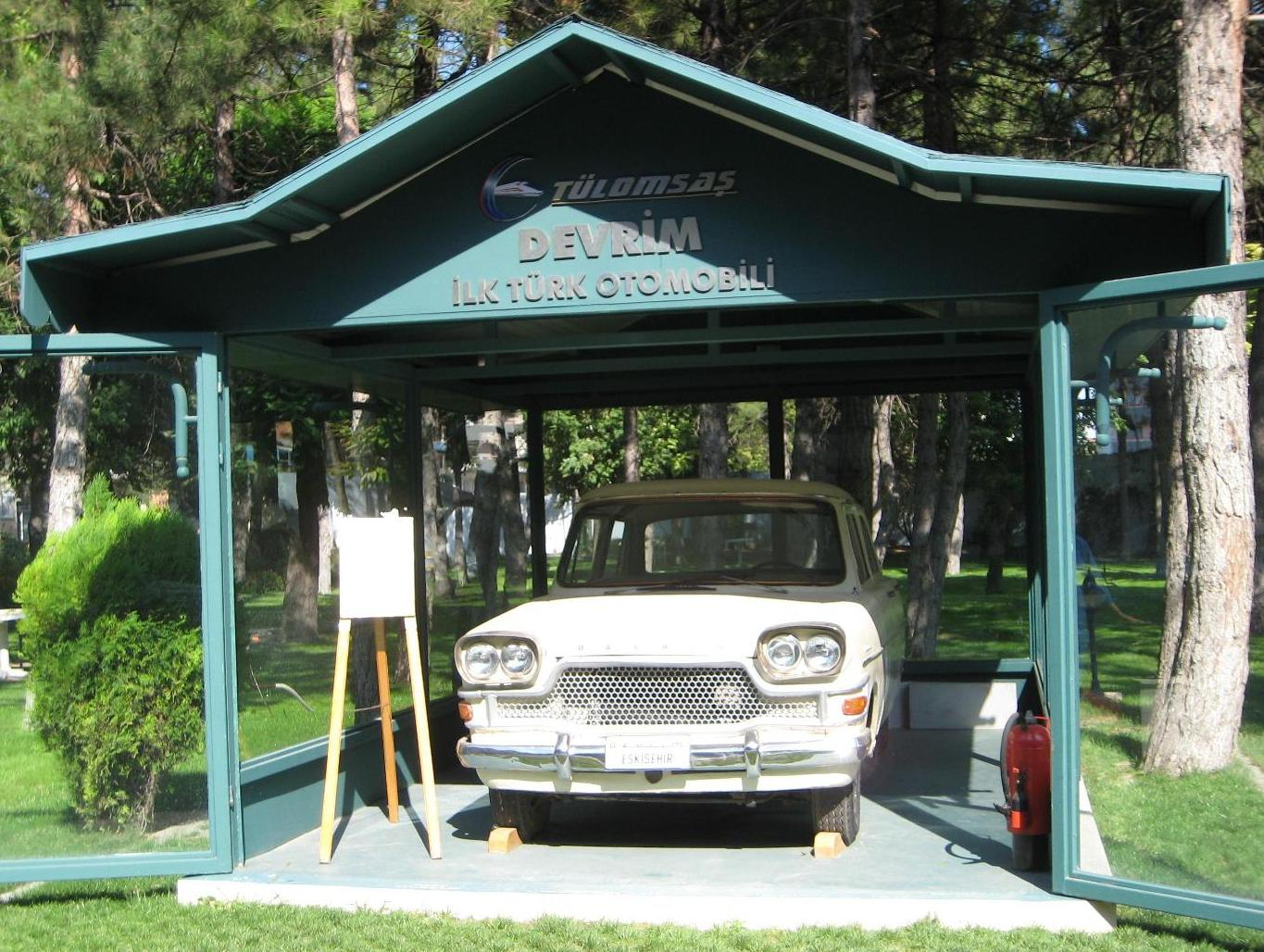
Last sample of Devrim at TÜLOMSAŞ

In 1961 four Devrim sedan prototypes were built at the Tülomsaş factory in Eskişehir. It was the first indigenously designed and produced Turkish automobile, but it did not enter production.

In 1964 the production of the Austin and Morris vehicles of the British Motor Corporation began at the BMC factory in İzmir. The BMC brand was later fully acquired by Turkey's Çukurova Group in 1989, which currently produces all BMC models in the world.

In 1966 Anadol became the first mass-produced Turkish automobile brand. All Anadol models were produced by the Otosan factory in Istanbul.

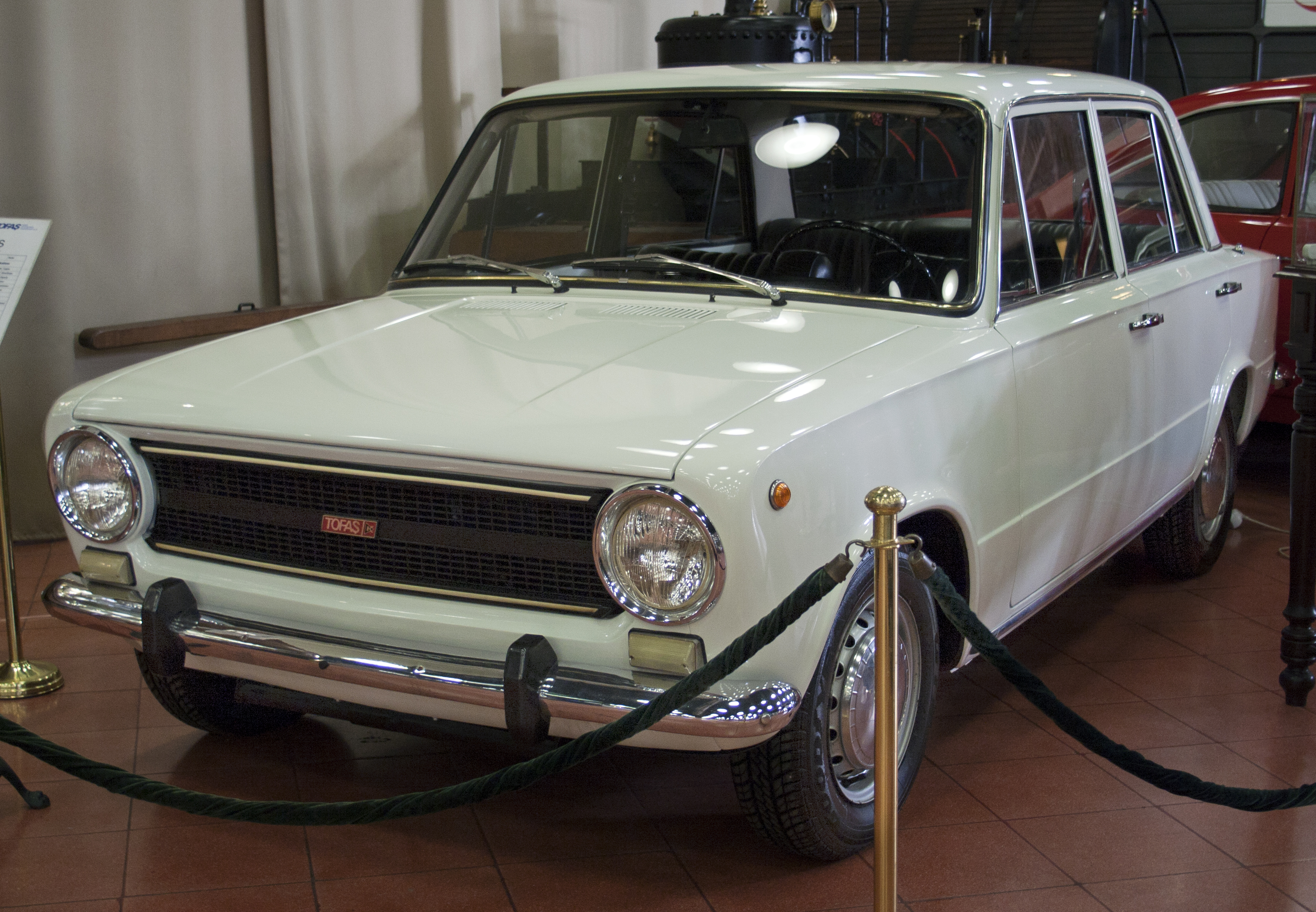
Tofaş Murat 124

In 1968 the Tofaş factory was opened in Bursa for producing Fiat models under licence.

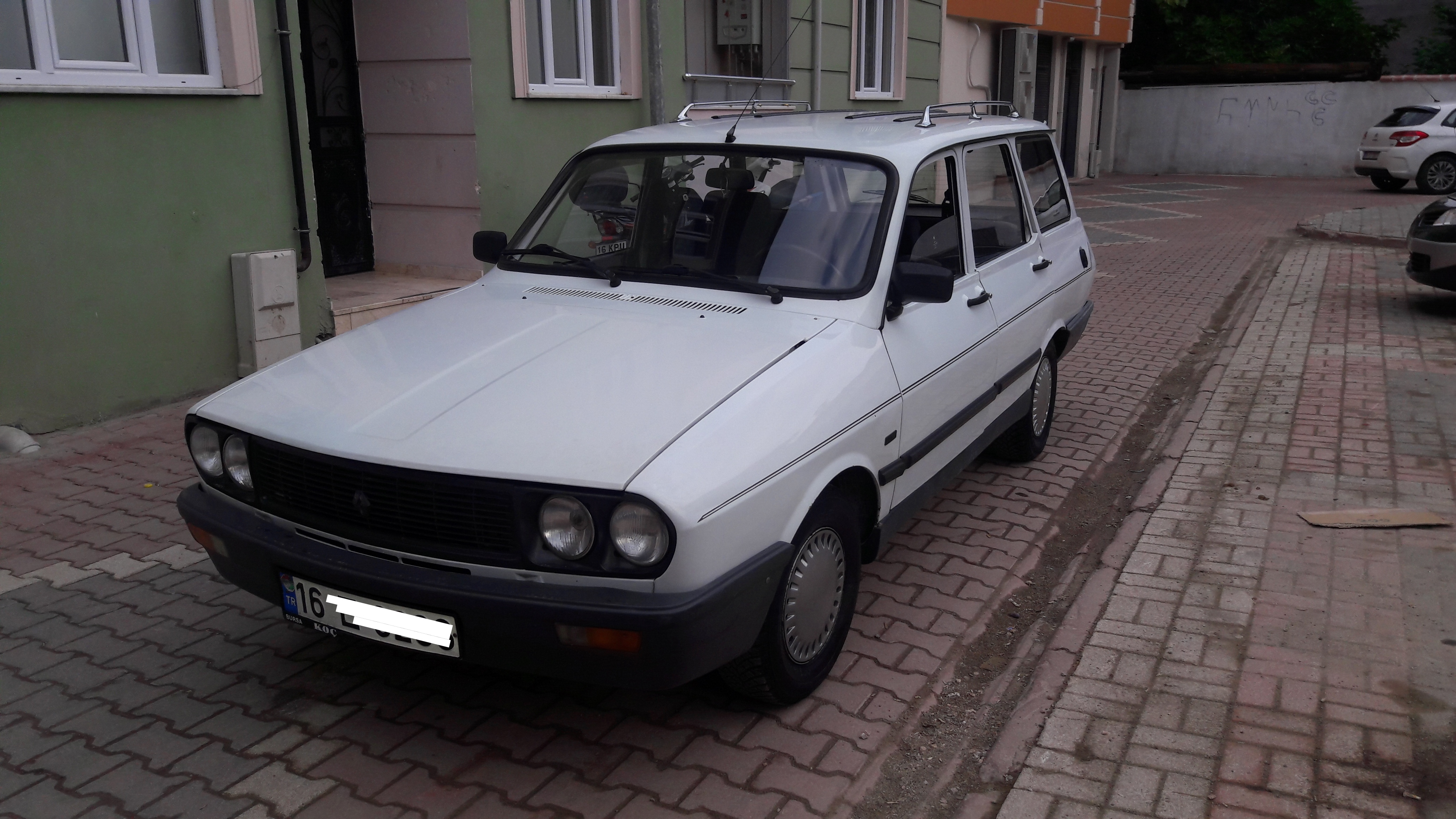
Oyak-Renault 12 Toros

In 1969 the Oyak-Renault factory was established in Bursa for producing Renault models.

Other global automotive manufacturers such as Toyota, Honda, Opel, Hyundai, Mercedes-Benz and MAN Truck & Bus produce automobiles, vans, buses and trucks in their Turkish factories. There are also a number of Turkish bus and truck brands, such as BMC, Otokar and TEMSA.

By 2004, Turkey was exporting 518,000 vehicles a year, mostly to the European Union member states.

In 2006, the European Investment Bank loaned Tofaş €175 million to jointly develop and produce with PSA Peugeot Citroën and Fiat Auto small commercial vehicles for the European market. The loan, part-financing for total investments estimated at €400 million, was intended to result in an important expansion of the company's production capabilities and create around 5,000 new jobs. The vehicles will be produced at the manufacturing plant of Tofaş in Bursa with an additional, initial, annual capacity of 135.000 cars, due to roll off the assembly line in late 2007.

The first official introduction of Etox Zafer took place on 30 August 2007.

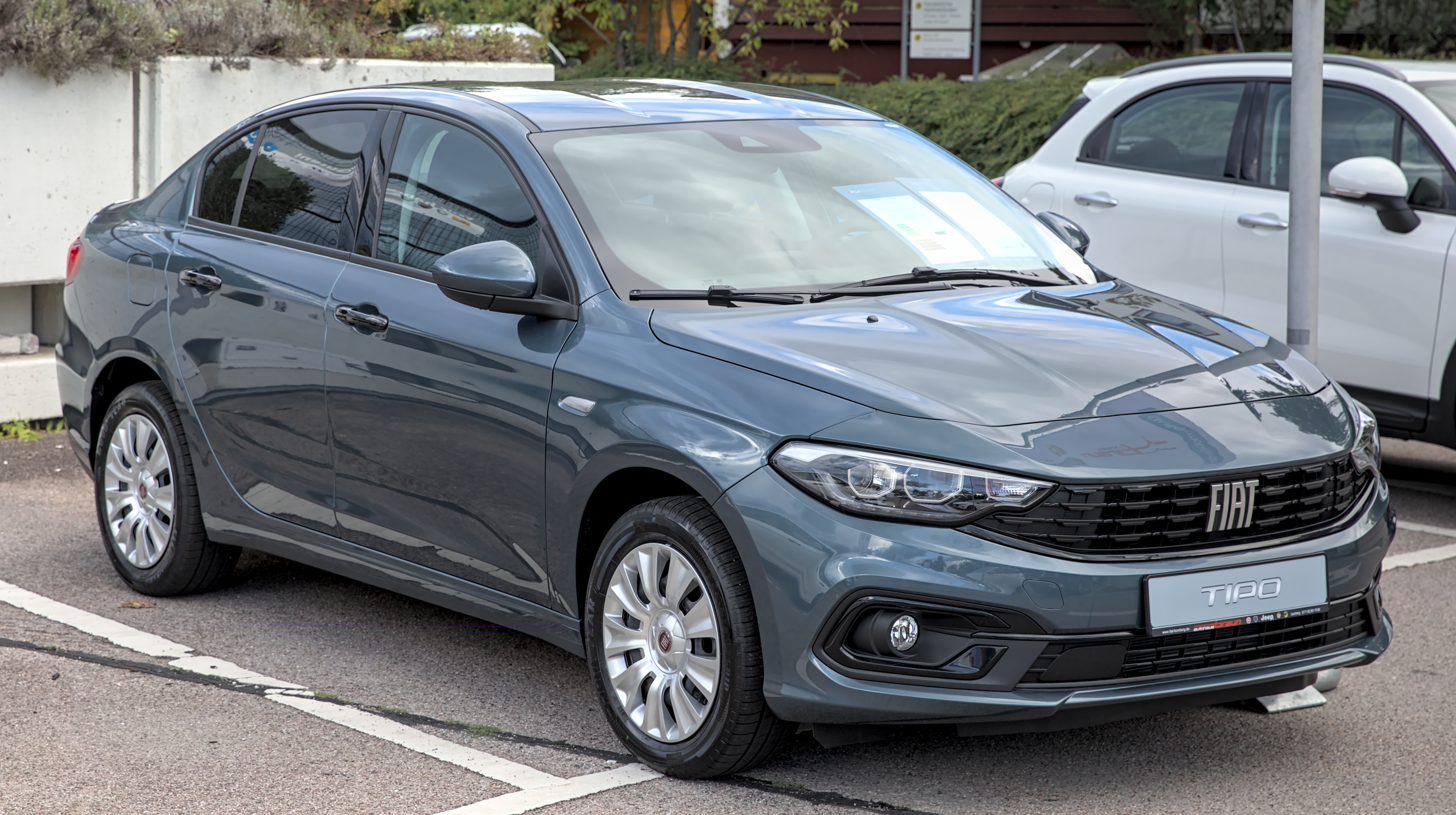
Fiat Egea is fully designed and produced by TOFAŞ

Like in many countries, the car manufacturing industry was significantly affected by the Great Recession. In March 2009, Turkey's Automotive Industry Association (OSD) said the automotive production fell by 63% on year in the first two months of 2009, as exports dropped by 61.6% in the same period.

In 2019, the high automotive export figures were boosted by the substantial increase in sales to the Netherlands and the U.S., which saw a rise of 131% and 55%, respectively. According to Uludağ Automotive Industry Exporters.

Togg, a Turkish automotive manufacturer of electric luxury cars, is presented on December 27, 2019 during a public event in Gebze in the province of Kocaeli, where the Turkish president unveiled the prototypes of a compact sedan, the T10S, and a compact SUV, the T10X, designed by Murat Günak and the design firm Pininfarina. The opening of the Togg factory in Gemlik is inaugurated on October 29, 2022, the Turkish Republic Day. The factory was built in a quick time of just over 2 years, with construction having started on July 18, 2020 for a total of 1.2 million square meters. During the event, the company was presented by its vision, its mission, its production objectives as well as its approach to users. This day also saw the first Togg vehicle, an Anadolu red T10X, come off the assembly line. In addition, the public was able to learn of the arrival of a 4-door coupé model, the C-XCoupe, in 2026.

== Manufacturers ==
=== Active ===
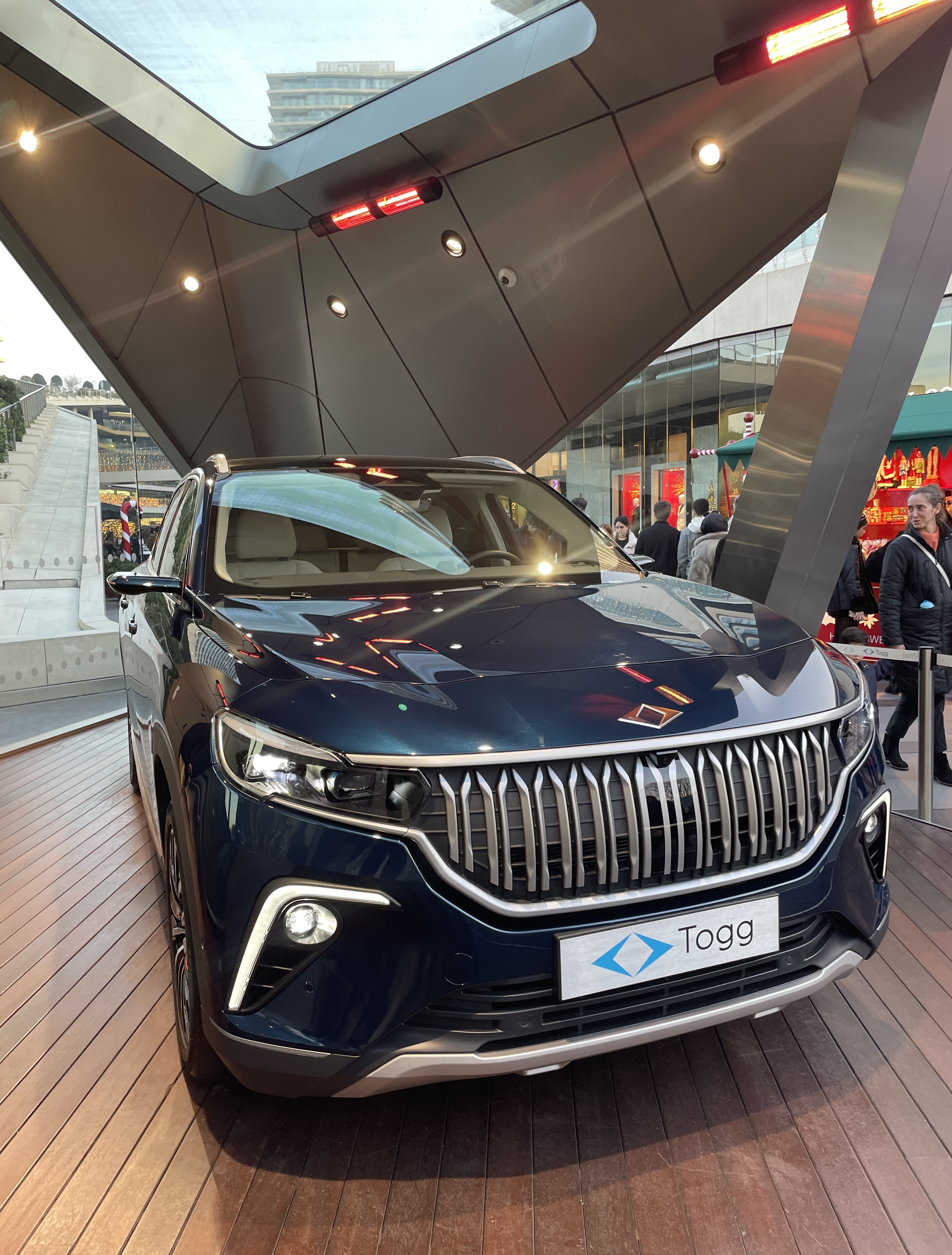
Showcase of the Togg T10X model at Zorlu Center in Istanbul

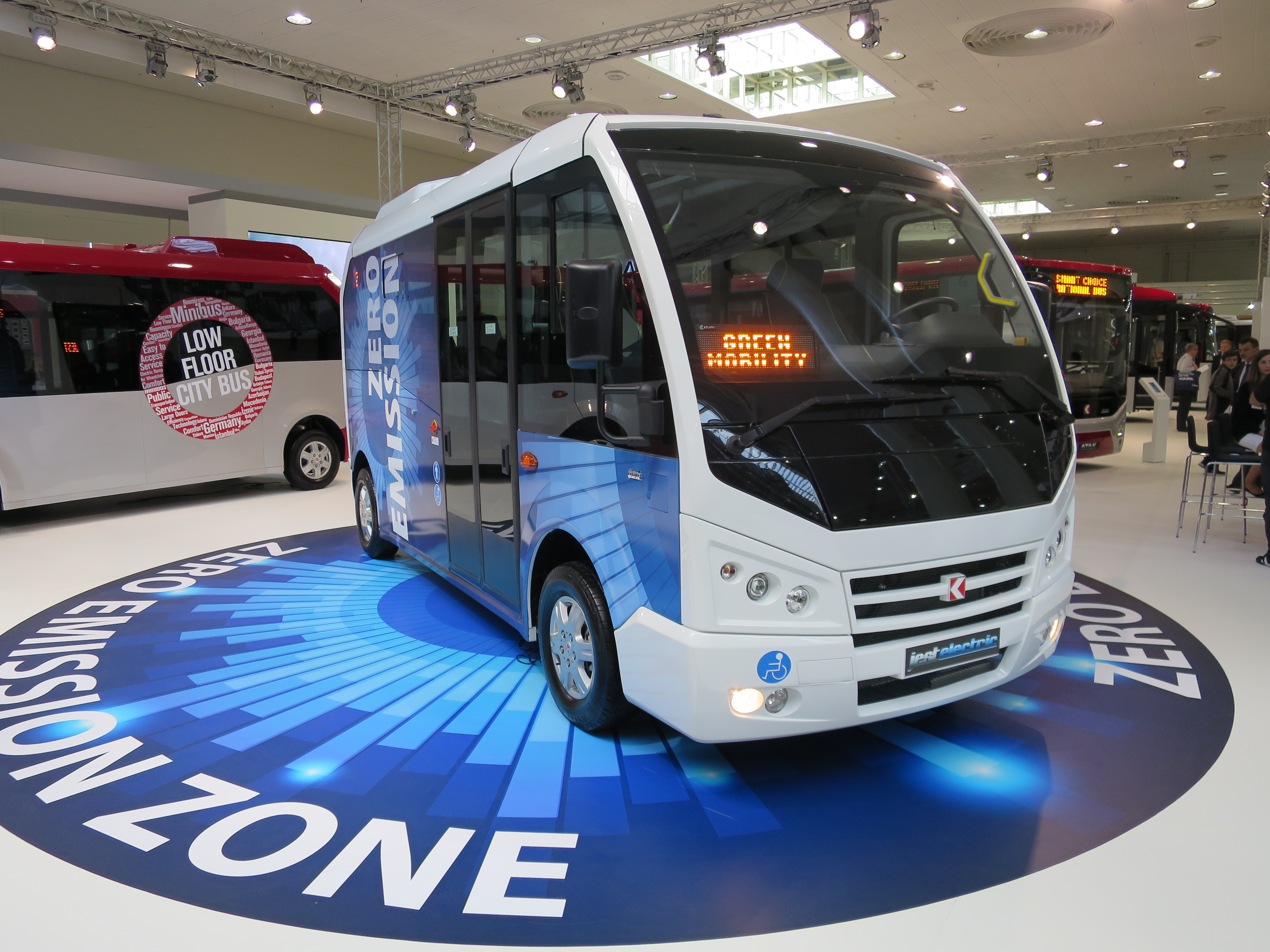
Karsan e-Jest at IAA 2016

- BMC
- Bora
- Diardi
- Erkunt
- Etox
- FNSS Defence Systems
- Ford Otosan
- Hyundai
- Isuzu
- Karsan
- Kral
- Mercedes-Benz Türk
- Onuk
- Otokar
- Oyak-Renault
- Pilotcar
- TEMSA
- Tofaş
- TOGG
- Toyota

=== Defunct ===
- Anadol
- Askam
- Devrim
- EVT Motor
- Honda
- Imza
- Otokar-Renault
- Otoser
- Özaltın

== Production ==
World map of motor vehicle production in 2007.

In 2022 Turkey produced 1,352,648 motor vehicles, ranking as the 13th largest producer in the world.

Annual production in Turkey had earlier peaked at 1,695,731 motor vehicles in 2017, when the country also ranked 13th in the world.

Turkey produced 1,124,982 motor vehicles in 2010, ranking as the 7th largest automotive producer in Europe; behind Germany (5,819,614), France (3,174,260), Spain (2,770,435), the United Kingdom (1,648,388), Russia (1,508,358) and Italy (1,211,594), respectively.

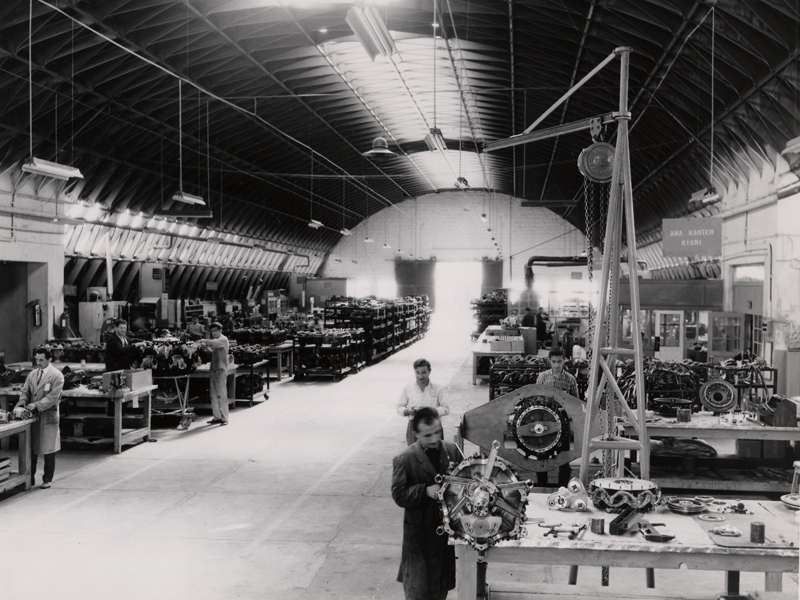
Turkish Aircraft, Automobile and Engine Limited Company (Tayyare Otomobil Türk Anonim Şirketi, TOMTAŞ) in early 20th century.

In 2008 Turkey produced 1,147,110 motor vehicles, ranking as the 6th largest producer in Europe (behind the United Kingdom and above Italy) and the 15th largest producer in the world.

The combined capacity of the 6 companies producing passenger cars stood at 726,000 units per year in 2002, reaching 991,621 units per year in 2006. In 2002, Fiat/Tofaş had 34% of this capacity, Oyak/Renault 31%, Hyundai/Assan and Toyota 14% each, Honda 4%, and Ford/Otosan 3%.

With a cluster of car-makers and parts suppliers, the Turkish automotive sector has become an integral part of the global network of production bases, exporting over $22,944,000,000 worth of motor vehicles and components in 2008.

Turkey also manufactures motorcycles as well as electric bicycles, e-scooters and 3 wheelers. Electric lorries are produced as well. Turkey aims to produce batteries for these e-vehicles.

== Economics ==
As of 2021 the special consumption tax^{(Turkish)} – a sales tax on luxuries, such as private cars – is

- Up to 85 kW motor - 60%
- 85 kW to 120 kW - 150%
- 120 kW and over 220%

The is a 40% import tariff on Chinese electric cars, whereas the EU and US have 10% and 27.5% tariffs on them. As of 2023 health impact assessment is not done in Turkey. As of 2025, nearly 18% of new car sales were electric, making Turkey the 4th place in Europe.

=== Charging network ===
As of 2025, there were more than 35,000 stations serving countrywide with 2.588 MW installed. The CCS2 charging standard is used.

== See also ==
- List of companies of Turkey
- Automotive industry
- Economy of Turkey
