= Togg =

Turkish electric car manufacturer

TOGG

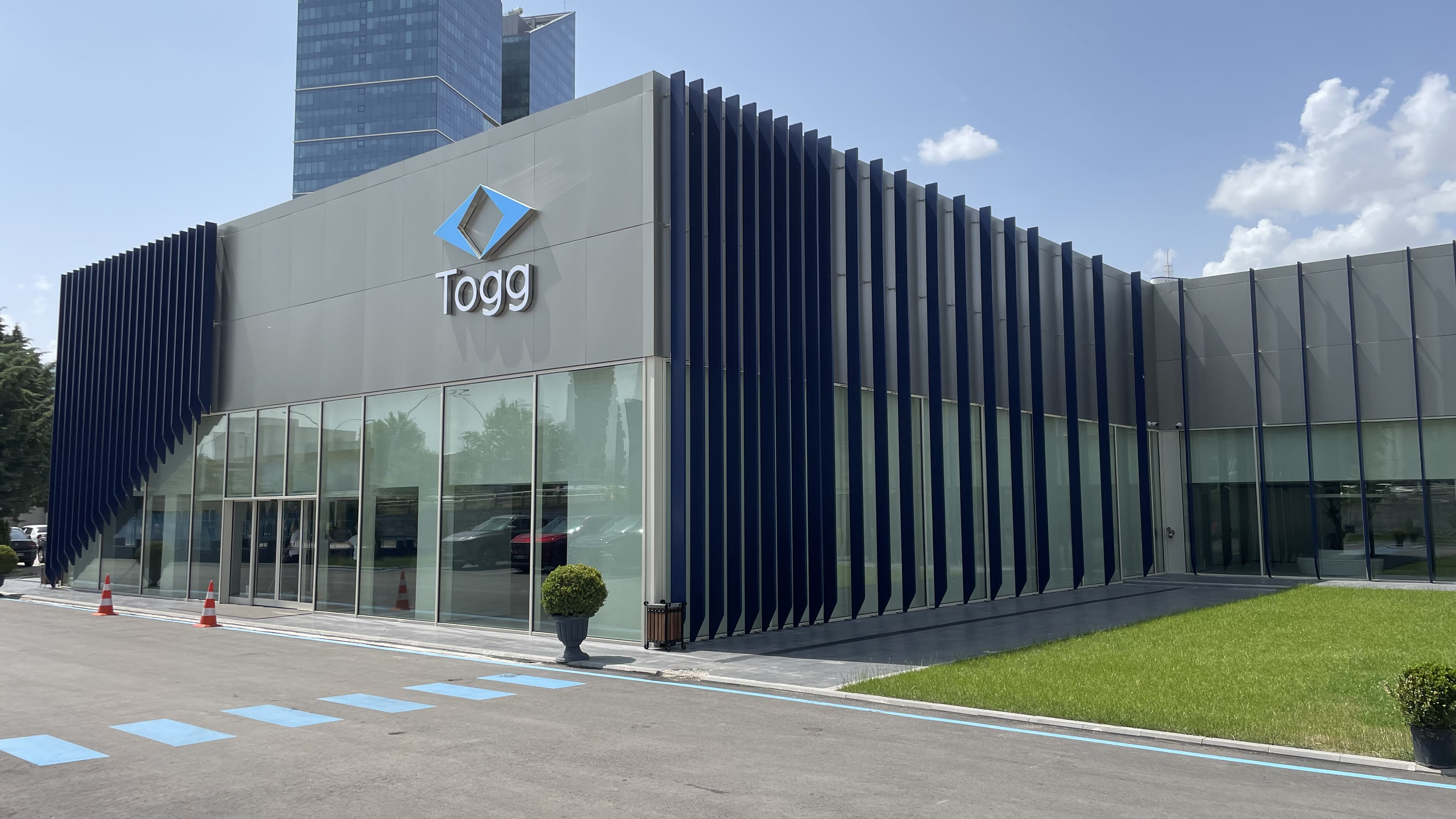
- Togg showroom in Ankara
- Type: Joint Stock Company
- Industry: Automotive, mobility ecosystem
- Founded: 25 June 2018; 8 years ago
- Headquarters: Gebze, Kocaeli Province, Turkey
- Area served: Europe, Middle East, South Caucasus, Central Asia, South East Asia
- Key people: Mehmet Gürcan Karakaş (CEO); Sergio Rocha (COO)
- Products: Electric car
- Owner: Anadolu Group (23%); BMC Turkey (23%); Turkcell (23%); Zorlu Holding (23%); TOBB (8%)
- Number of employees: 1,475 (2023)
- Subsidiaries: Trugo (EV charging network); Siro (50%)
- Website: www.togg.com.tr

TOGG (stylised as Togg), acronym of Türkiye'nin Otomobili Girişim Grubu (lit. 'Turkey's Automobile Joint Venture Group'), is a Turkish automotive manufacturer of electric cars headquartered in Gebze, Kocaeli Province, Turkey. The company was founded as a joint venture by five Turkish companies in 2018. An assembly plant was opened in 2022 in Gemlik, Bursa province, next to Togg's subsidiary Siro which produces the lithium-ion batteries. Sales of the first vehicle, the Togg T10X, started in March 2023.

== History ==
Togg's previous logo (2018–2021)

Togg is the first major national manufacturer of electric cars in Turkey, supported by the Turkish government. However, it is not the first Turkish automobile to have been designed and produced. The Devrim was the first Turkish car, of which four prototypes were built in Eskişehir in 1961. Anadol was the first mass-produced Turkish automobile brand. TOGG is the result of the association of five Turkish companies in a consortium, supported by the government and the Union of Chambers and Stock Exchange of Turkey (TOBB), to design and market 100% electric Turkish automobiles as well as to develop a new transformational mobility ecosystem with Turkish intellectual and industrial property.

The companies and organizations that decided to work together to produce electric vehicles in Turkey were announced by President Recep Tayyip Erdoğan in November 2017. For this purpose, Turkey's Automobile Joint Venture Group (Togg) was launched on 25 June 2018, by Anadolu Group (19%), BMC (19%), Kök Group (19%), Turkcell (19%), Zorlu Holding (19%) and TOBB (5%). In September 2019, it was claimed that Kök Group would withdraw from the project. In October 2019, the company headquarters moved from Şişli, Istanbul, to Gebze, Kocaeli. The CEO of the company, Gürcan Karakaş, announced that the design of the SUV and sedan models will be completed in 2019, and they will go on sale in 2022. The SUV and sedan models of Togg were introduced at a press conference held on 27 December 2019. The body design work of Togg's SUV and sedan models were done by Turkish designer Murat Günak and Pininfarina.

In 2021, Anadolu Group, Turkcell, and Vestel (part of Zorlu Holding) invested more money to increase the total capital from ₺150 million to almost ₺1 billion, and their share to about 23% each, while those of BMC (Turkey) and TOBB increased to 23% and 8% respectively.

Togg established a factory in Gemlik, Bursa for the production of electric cars with a cost of ₺22 billion. It was announced that project-based state aid would be given for the factory. Construction of the factory started on 21 May 2020. In August 2020, it was decided that the company would manufacture under the Togg brand. On 18 December 2021, Togg's new logo was introduced. Togg's international debut took place at the CES 2022 event in Las Vegas, Nevada, USA, on 5 January 2022.

== Models ==
Togg plans to produce 5 different models by 2030. Also, the manufacturer aims to export one million vehicles to European countries by the end of the decade.

Name	Type	Announcement	Unveiling	Production	Motor	Image
Togg T10X	C-segment SUV	2019	29 December 2019	29 October 2022	Electric	
Togg T10F	Fastback sedan	2019	29 December 2019	2025	Electric	
Togg T8CX	C-segment Xcoupe	2022	29 October 2022	After 2026	Electric	
Togg T8X	B-segment SUV	TBA	TBA	Until 2030	Electric	
Togg 10V	C-segment MPV	TBA	TBA	Until 2030	Electric	

=== T10X ===
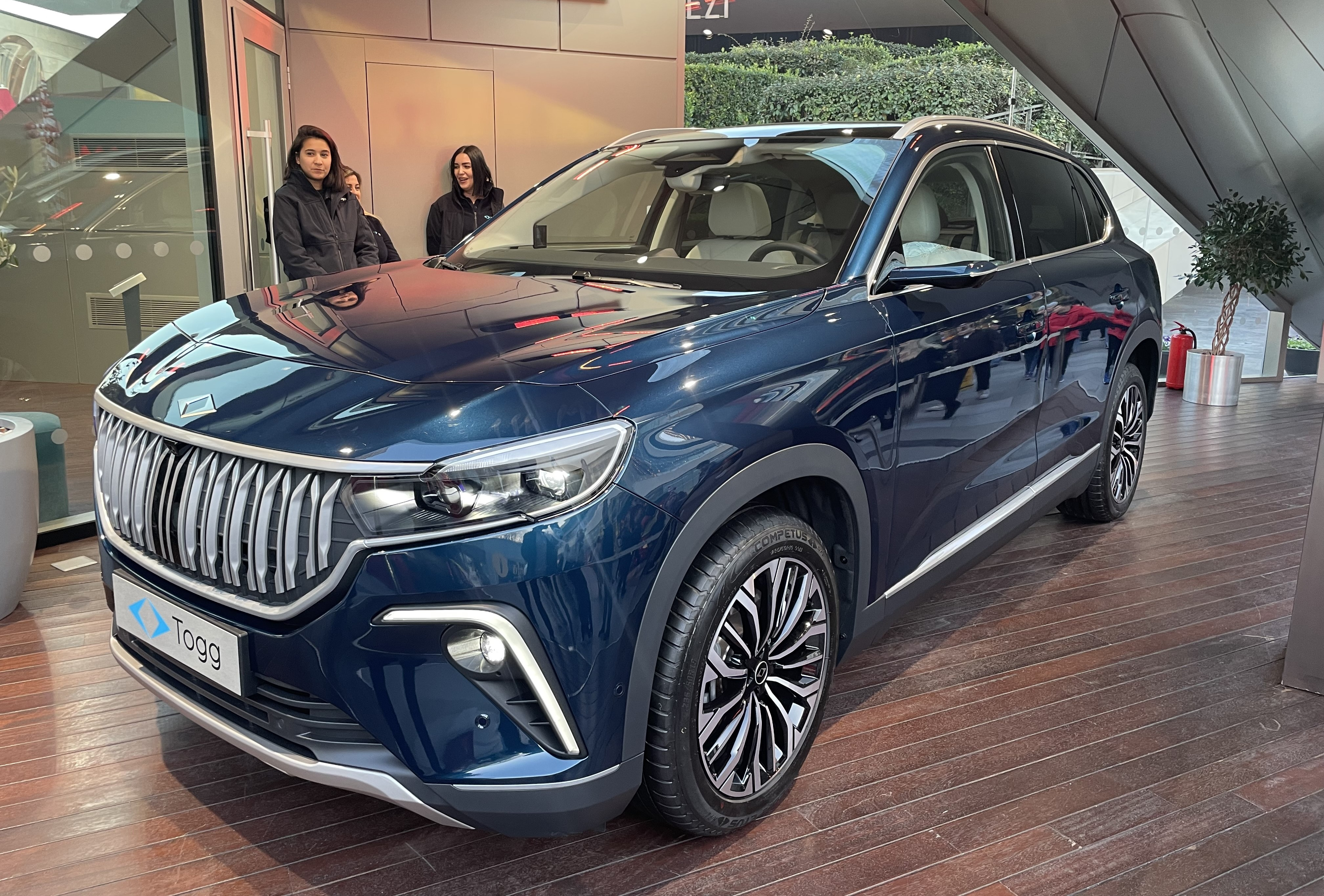
2022 Togg T10X on display at Zorlu Center in Istanbul.

The manufacturer's first model is a 100% electric SUV whose design was designed by Turkish automotive designer Murat Günak and the Pininfarina firm. The design of the T10X incorporates several elements of Turkish culture, notably the rims and the tulip-shaped grille. Additionally, the stitching lines on the T10X seats also represent a tulip. The concept name of this SUV was the C-SUV, and was later named T10X when the vehicle was released.

Togg launches mass production of its all-electric SUV in October 2022, with a choice of two-wheel drive (RWD) and a 160 kW (218 PS) motor placed on the rear axle or all-wheel drive (AWD) with a second additional engine positioned at the front for a total of 320 kW (435 PS) and 700 N⋅m (516 lb⋅ft) of torque. Acceleration is 7.6s and 4.8s respectively to go from 0 to 100 km/h. Two Li-ion batteries are available offering a range of 314 or 523 km (195 or 325 mi) depending on the capacity chosen.

Inside, the T10X offers an ultra-modern ambiance with 12-inch digital instrumentation and a central touch screen resting on a 29-inch panel that covers the entire width of the dashboard. On the prototype model, then called C-SUV, two small screens were placed at the ends to transmit images from the camera mirrors.

=== T10F ===
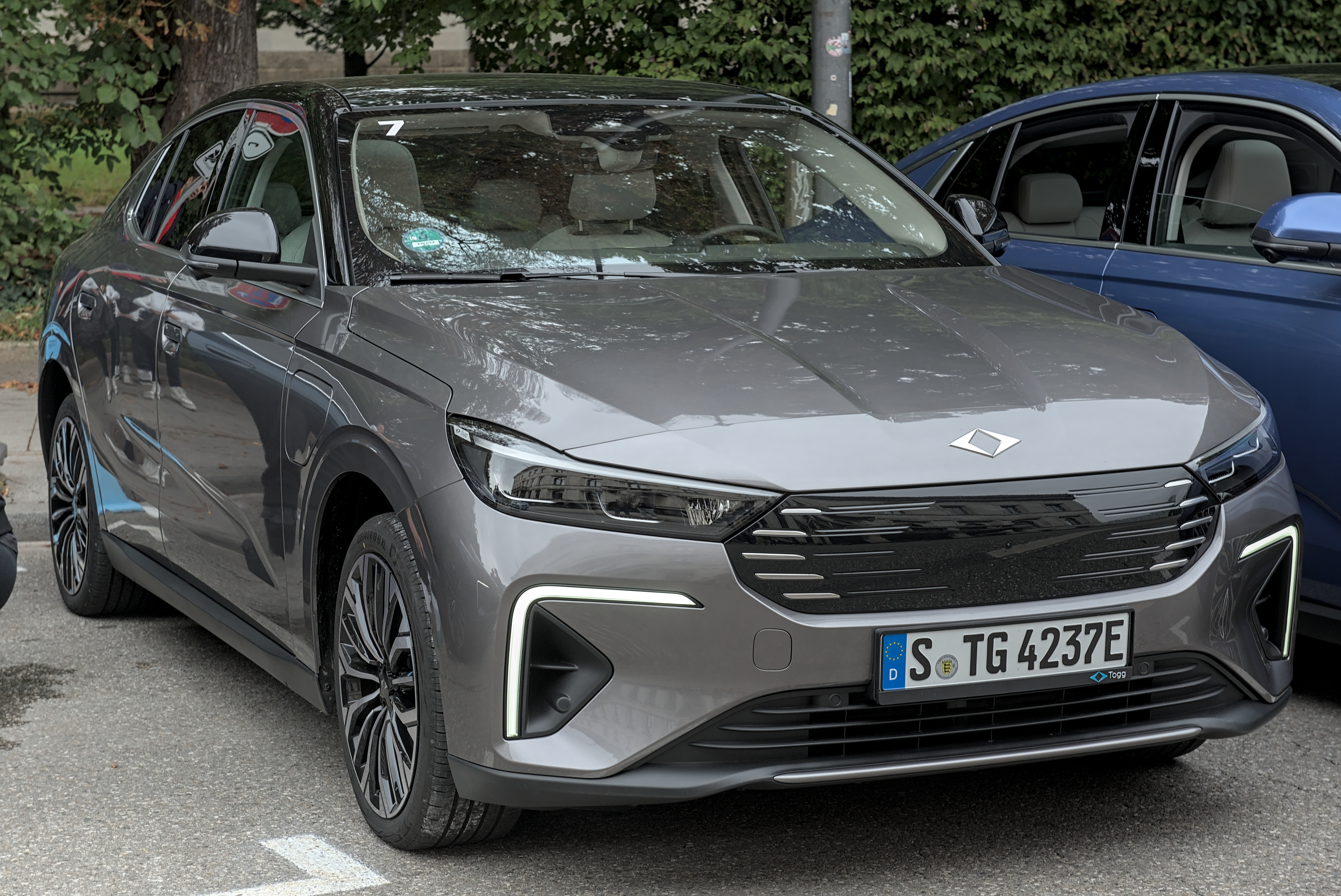
Togg T10F at IAA 2025

The T10F fastback sedan was unveiled at the 2024 Consumer Electronics Show (CES) in Las Vegas. This is the second model from the Turkish car manufacturer.

== Production plant ==
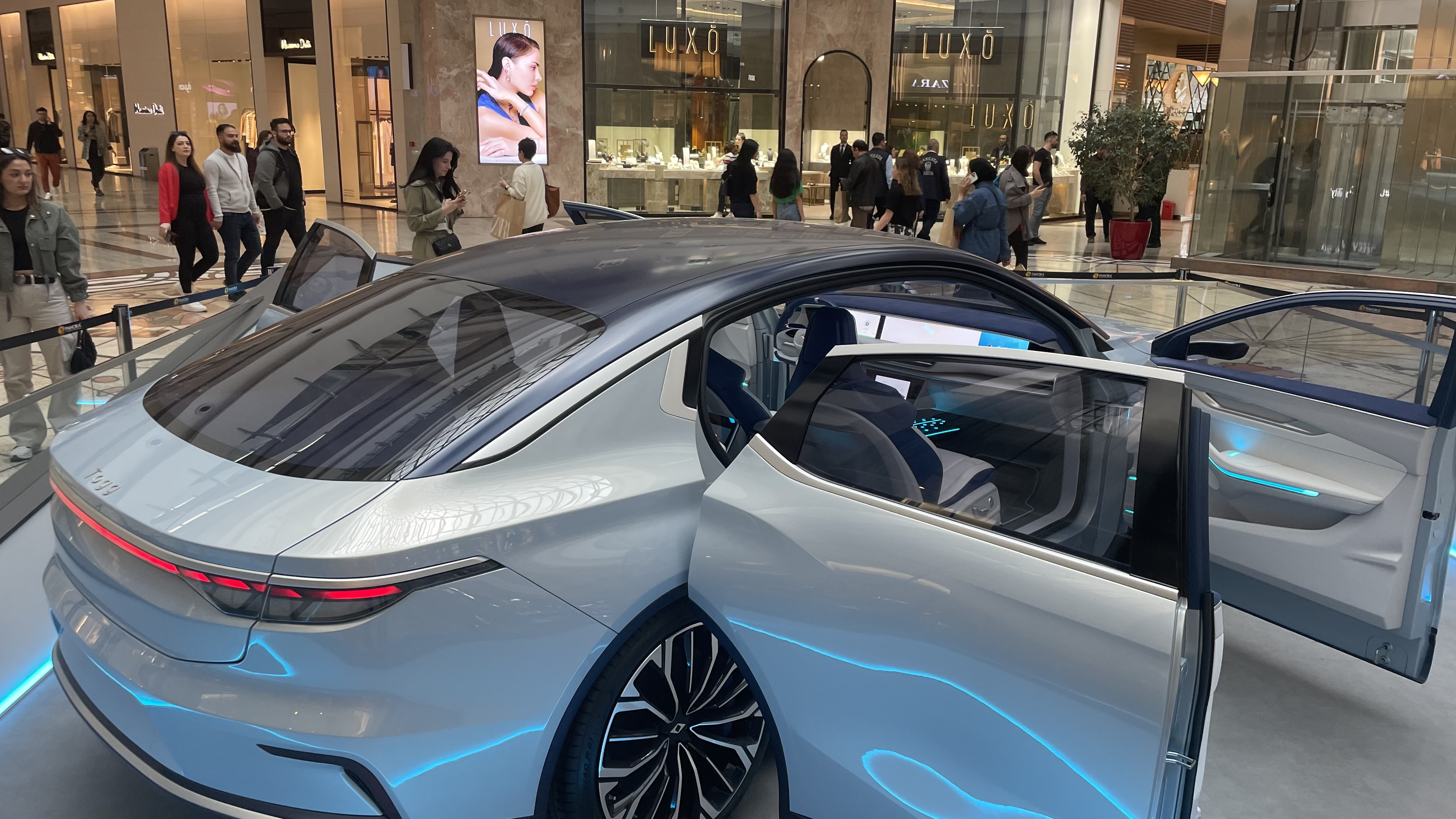
Togg sedan concept car

Gemlik district of Bursa Province was chosen as the production plant site. It is part of 400 ha (990 acres) of land owned by the Turkish Armed Forces. The site was preferred for its proximity to a seaport, a free-trade zone and to suppliers. The construction cost of the production plant is budgeted at ₺ 22 billion (approx. US$1.2 billion). Employment of 4,323 people is planned at the production plant. Annual production of 175,000 electric vehicles is planned. It was inaugurated on 29 Oct 2022.

== Suppliers ==
Commercial scale lithium production as a side product of boron is planned for 2022. Togg has also entered into a joint venture with the Chinese battery company Farasis to manufacture lithium batteries for the car: the new 50/50 venture is called Siro, and will be built near Ankara.

== Economics ==
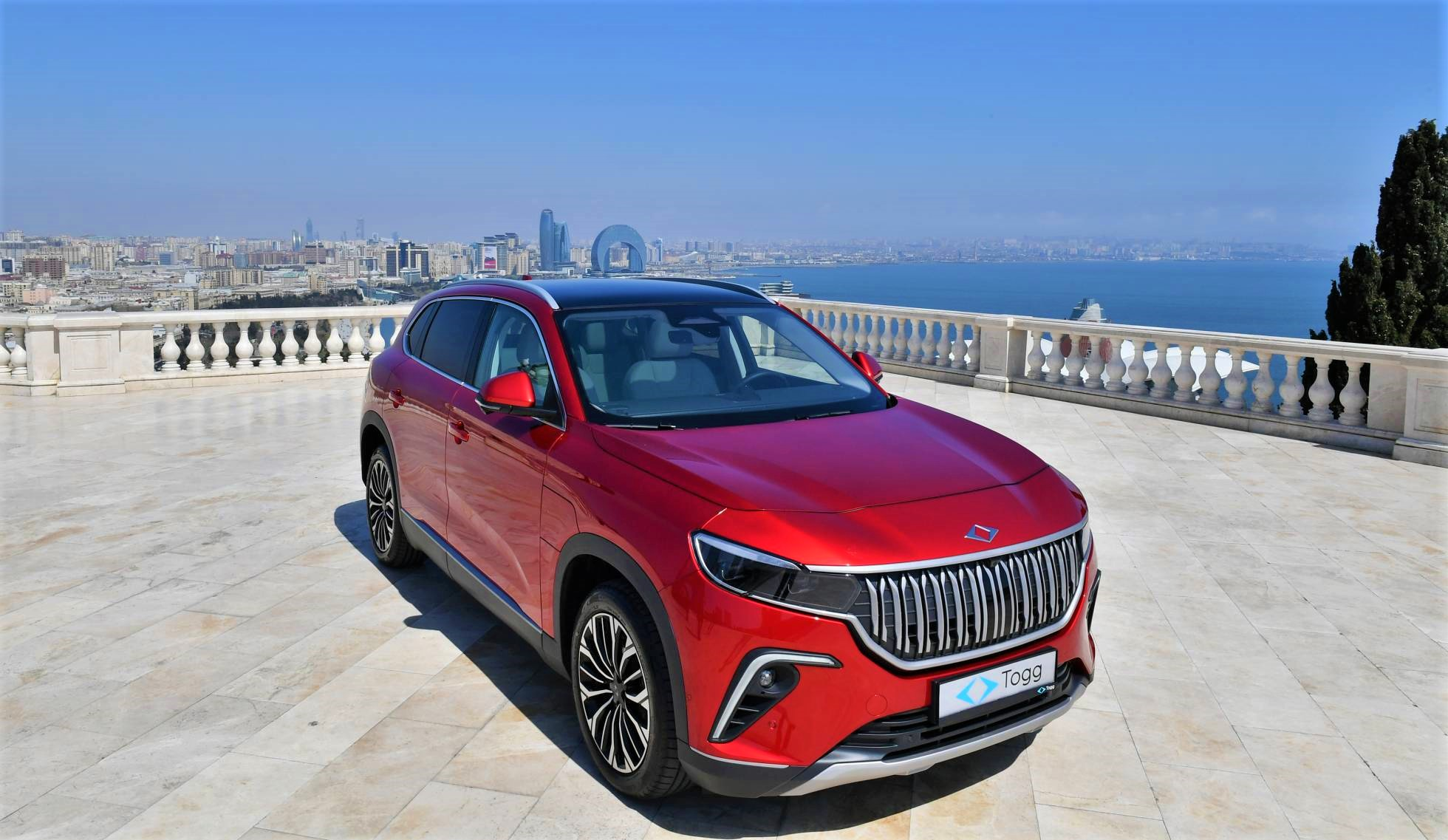
Togg T10X in Anadolu red during a presentation in Baku, Azerbaijan

In June 2022, less than 1% of the cars sold in Turkey were electric. As of 2025, the figure jumped to nearly 18% As of July 2022 the special consumption tax^{(Turkish)} A sales tax on luxuries – at the start of Togg's sales in March 2023 has been proposed to be:

- Up to 160 kW motor and price before tax under ₺700,000 - 10%
- Up to 160 kW motor and price before tax over ₺700,000 - 45%
- Over 160 kW motor and price before tax under ₺750,000 - 50%
- Over 160 kW motor and price before tax over ₺750,000 - 60%

== Legal issues ==
In June 2021, Togg filed a complaint in order to obtain the domain name “togg.com”, which was previously purchased by someone else, and brought the issue to the World Intellectual Property Organization. Togg, in their complaint, stated that the company was founded in 2018 to produce cars and the plaintiff does not have a factory yet but it unveiled plans for two electric vehicles in December 2019. In response, the defense said that the domain was bought in 2003 by a computer engineer named George Gould for the company named "The Office of George Gould", who sold his company and naming rights to another company in 2010, and the domain is already redirected to the website of another company (tcbinc.com) which is the current owner of the disputed "togg.com" and provides computer infrastructure services.

In September 2021, the complaint of Togg was rejected and ruled in favor of the domain registrant and found that the complaint was brought in bad faith (Reverse Domain Name Hijacking). In the judgment, it was also stated that Togg was right in its complaint about name similarity, but it was concluded that the defendant bought the domain name in 2014, 4 years before Togg was founded, and therefore it was not possible to have bad intentions.

== See also ==
- Automotive industry in Turkey
