= Etox =

Turkish sports car manufacturer

- Company type: Subsidiary
- Industry: Automotive
- Genre: Car Manufacturer
- Founded: 2006; 20 years ago
- Founder: Ercan Malkoç
- Headquarters: Ankara, Turkey
- Key people: Ercan Malkoç, CEO and President
- Website: Etox.com.tr

Etox is the first Turkish automobile manufacturer dedicated exclusively to building sports cars. The company is based in Ankara, Turkey. Its first model, the Etox Zafer, is the second Turkish sports car after the Anadol STC-16, which was produced from 1973 to 1975.

== Prototype ==
Designing the Etox Zafer took 6 months after testing and surveying among hundreds of prototypes. The latest prototype was created by 46 Turkish engineers in 2 years. The 100,000 kilometer quality tests of the Etox Zafer were completed in 2007.

== Mass production ==
The license for mass production of the Etox Zafer was granted by the Turkish Government in 2007. The Zafer is to be assembled in Turkey, with engines built by French, German and Swedish auto manufacturers, though Etox plans to develop its own engines in the near future. The 1.5 liter diesel engine which produces 125 bhp (93 kW) is a Renault engine with slight ECU modifications; the 3.0 liter diesel engine which produces 225 bhp (168 kW) is a BMW engine; while the 3.0 liter gasoline engine which produces 272 bhp (203 kW) is a Volvo engine. Apart from the three standard engines, a 450 bhp (340 kW) engine is also available for special orders.

The Etox Zafer costs between 85,000 and 150,000 TL (10,000 and 18,000 USD) depending on the model and engine type.

== Official introduction of Etox Zafer ==
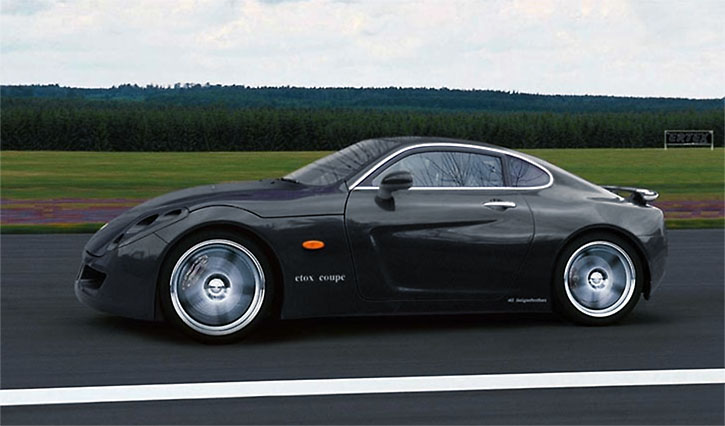
Etox Zafer Coupe on a Turkish road

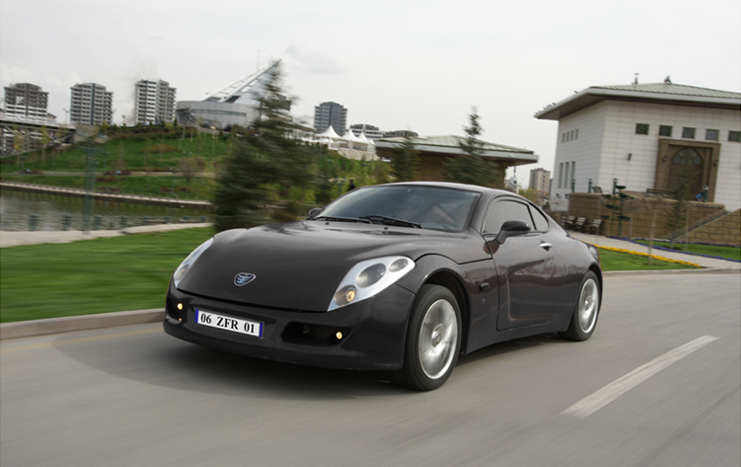
Etox Zafer Coupé near Göksu Park in the Eryaman district of Ankara

The first official introduction of Etox Zafer took place on 30 August 2007. August the 30th is the Zafer Bayramı (Victory Day) in Turkey (the word Zafer means Victory in Turkish).

== Technical specifications ==
=== Dimensions ===
- Length: 4215 mm
- Width: 1980 mm
- Height: 1290 mm
- Axle distance: 2575 mm
- Front trace gap: 1700 mm
- Rear trace gap: 1698 mm

=== Engines ===
Etox Zafer is powered by 3 standard engines, and 1 optional engine:

- 1.5 litre, 125 bhp (93 kW) diesel engine (standard production)
- 3.0 litre, 225 bhp (168 kW) diesel engine (standard production)
- 3.0 litre V6, 272 bhp (203 kW) gasoline engine (standard production)
- 450 bhp (340 kW) engine (optional)
