= Özmaktaş-Özaltın Makina Otomotiv =

Özmaktaş-Özaltın Makina Otomotiv was a Turkish company specialized in assembling cars and motor vehicles by using CKD kits. The firm was located in Adana and used the brand name Özaltin. Özaltin was founded in 2000 and classified as a manufacturer of exotic cars because the annual production was very low.

== Models ==
Özaltin offered products from other manufacturers. The first model of the brand was the Özaltin Platin EX minivan, licensed by the Chongqing Chang'an Automobile Company. The pickup variant was known as the Özaltin Silver. As second model, the Özaltin Gold, was introduced some months later. This car was in license of Zxauto and was identical to the Toyota Hilux and the Volkswagen Taro. The old Toyota ToyoAce Custom from the early 1990s was currently built in a slightly different design as the Özaltin Sedef. Another model of the brand was the Özaltin Kristal.
