= Togg T10F =

Battery electric compact sedan

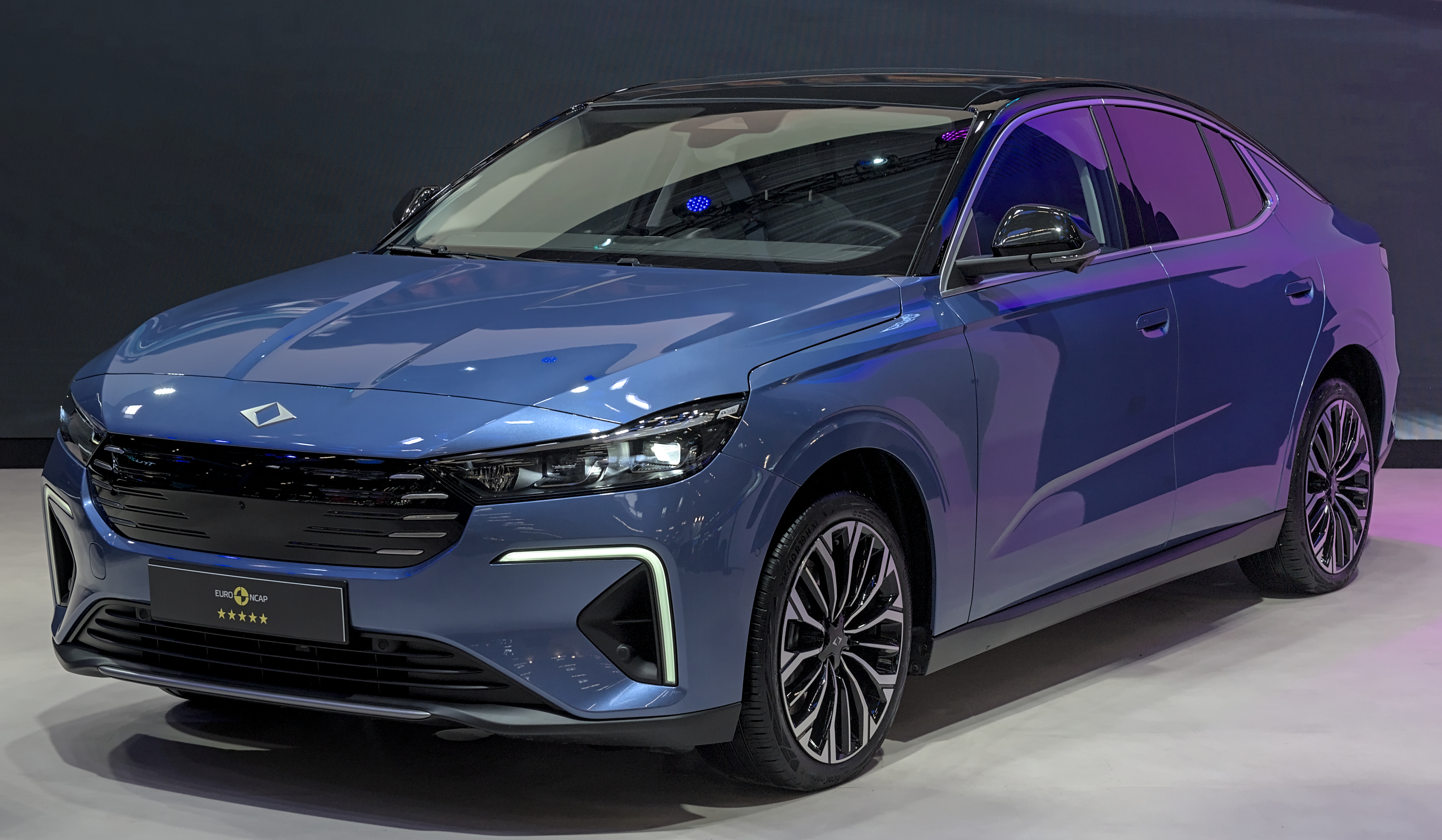

Overview
- Manufacturer: Togg
- Production: 2025–present
- Assembly: Turkey: Gemlik
- Designer: Murat Günak and Pininfarina

Body and chassis
- Class: Compact car (C)
- Body style: 5-door liftback sedan
- Layout: Rear-motor, rear-wheel-drive (RWD); Dual-motor, four-wheel-drive (AWD)
- Related: Togg T10X

Powertrain
- Electric motor: Single motor: 160 kW (215 hp); Dual motor: 320 kW (429 hp)
- Transmission: Single-speed fixed
- Battery: 88.5 kWh or 52.4 kWh
- Range: 623 km (387 mi) WLTP
- Plug-in charging: CCS up to 180 kW

Dimensions
- Wheelbase: 2,890 mm (113.8 in)
- Length: 4,830 mm (190.2 in)
- Width: 1,881 mm (74.1 in)
- Height: 1,560 mm (61.4 in)
- Curb weight: 1,939–2,235 kg (4,275–4,927 lb)

The Togg T10F is a battery electric compact car produced by the Turkish car manufacturer Togg. Presented in 2024, the T10F follows the T10X as the second of five models that the company plans to release by 2030.

== Naming ==
The T10F has a designation that corresponds to a model code at Togg:

- The "T" refers to Turkey, the vehicle's country of origin, and Togg;
- The "10" stands for compact segment (C);
- The "F" designates the fastback sedan body type.

== Overview ==
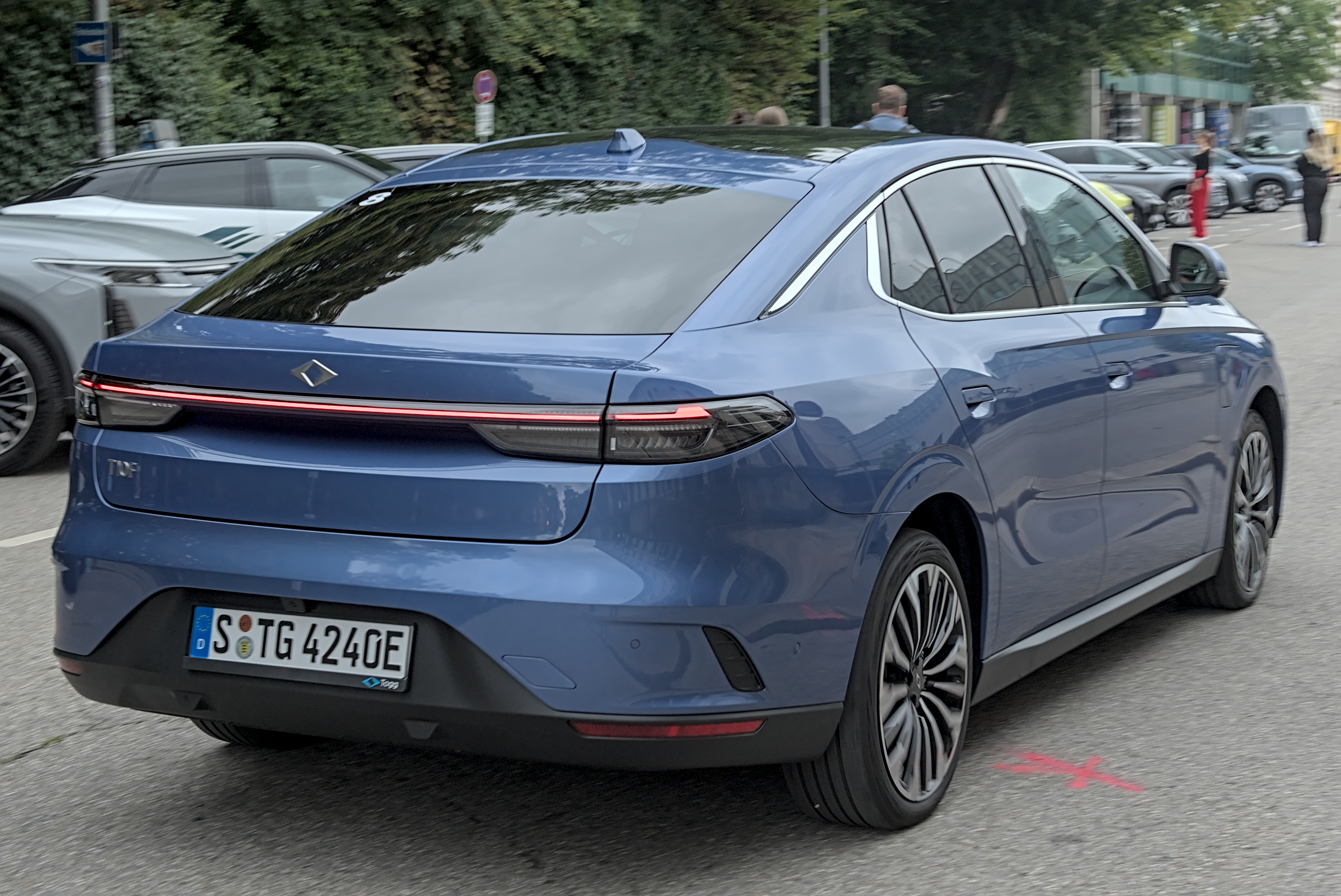
Rear view

The T10F was presented by Turkish automaker Togg on 9 January 2024, during the Consumer Electronics Show (CES) 2024 held in Las Vegas.

=== Design ===
The fastback body shape allows the sedan to offer a sportier design than conventional sedans. However, the design moves away from the classic notchback fastback shape and adopts a more dynamic and aerodynamic silhouette with its five doors. Key design features include a sculpted line that extends from the front to the rear door, a rear wing edge that wraps around the door handle, and a vertical chrome element on the C-pillar. The T10F's design emphasizes details and aerodynamics, featuring flush door handles and sculpted wheels to optimize airflow. The surface of the rear wings follows the base of the rear window, incorporating an integrated spoiler. Cutting the rear pillar allows for a two-tone roof. The front of the T10F features boomerang-shaped daytime running lights, with long, thin turn signals integrated into the front fascia. The grille has been sculpted with recesses and chrome inserts reminiscent of tulip petals, one of the symbols of Turkey. The rear light design mirrors that of the T10X SUV, with a side light design that visually increases the width of the vehicle. The rear bumper's aerodynamic air outlets mirror those at the front.

In terms of dimensions, the T10F is slightly taller, longer, and wider than the Tesla Model 3 and BYD Seal, which occupy the mid-size D-segment, despite the T10F being a C-segment compact size. The T10F is slated to compete against electric mid-size sedans like the BYD Seal, Tesla Model 3, and Hyundai Ioniq 6 in the Turkish EV market.

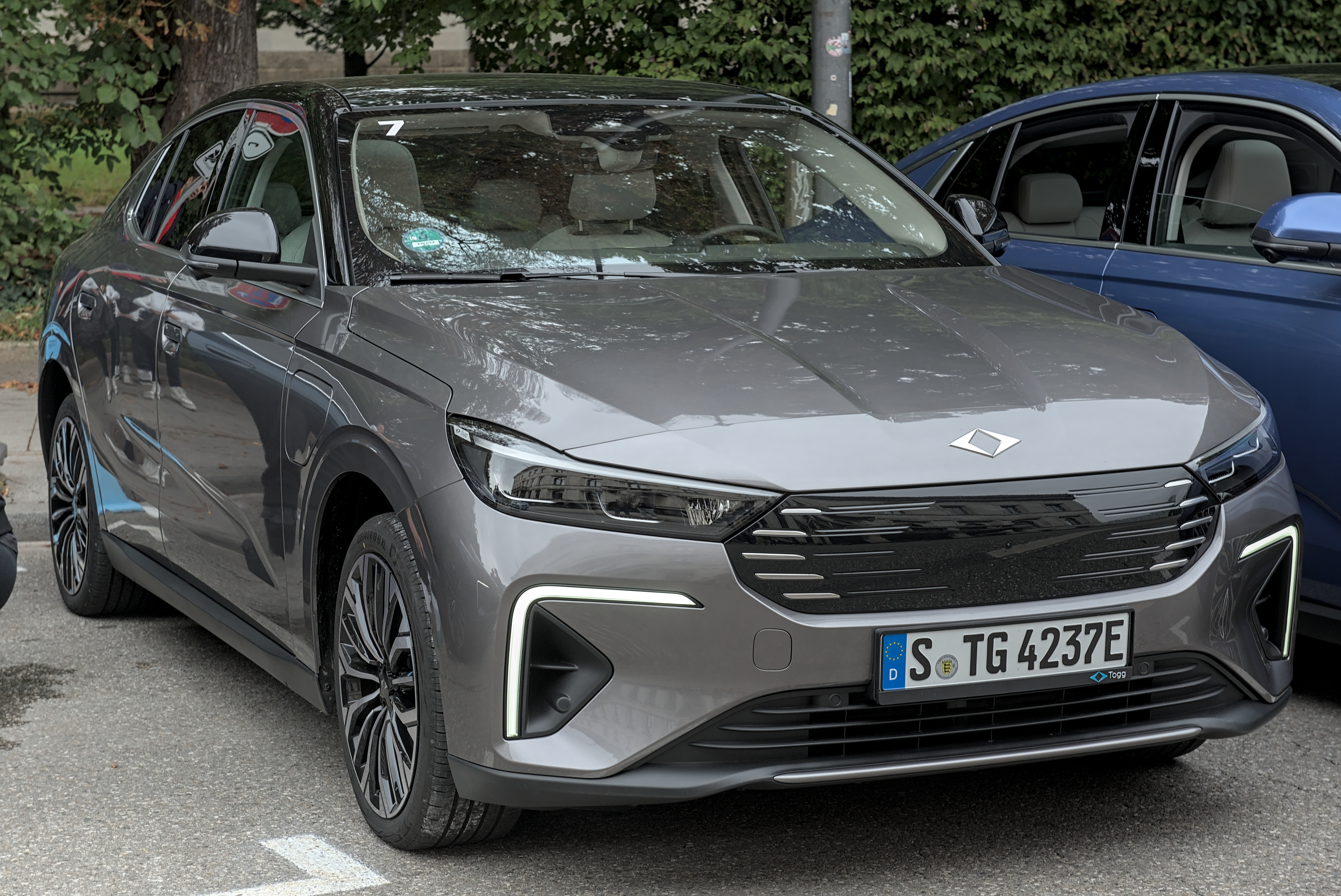
Togg T10F grey color

=== Interior ===
The interior of the T10F is very similar to that of the T10X. The interior offers 12.3-inch digital on-board instrumentation and a central touchscreen infotainment screen based on a 29-inch panoramic panel which covers the entire width of the dashboard. Added to this is a second 8-inch touch screen positioned further down for access to settings. The center console in a floating form has a rotary transmission selector on the side, a wireless charger, a button for the electronic parking brake, regenerative braking control and a touchpad. Standard equipment inside the vehicle also includes an on-board camera with voice activation and control. An infotainment system using artificial intelligence as well as Togg's Trumore digital platform incorporates a home automation (Smart Living) and ubiquitous technology system allowing the user to carry out multiple actions of daily life. The Trumore app allows access and use of the vehicle. The manufacturer offers a 12-speaker Meridian sound system inside its sedan.

=== Batteries ===
Togg offers two battery options for the T10F which correspond to a choice between a lithium-ion battery with a capacity of 52.4 kWh for a range of 350 km, or a larger lithium-ion battery with a capacity of 88.5 kWh providing a range of 623 km. The T10F has a charging capacity of up to 180 kW with a DC charger, allowing the battery to charge from 20% to 80% in 28 minutes. The batteries are produced at Siro in Gemlik, Bursa province. Siro's facilities are located alongside the Togg plant. Siro is a Togg subsidiary (50% owned) established in partnership with energy company Farasis Energy. Togg is also developing its own battery technology under the Trugo brand.

=== Safety ===
The T10F comes standard with seven airbags and a suite of Advanced Driver Assistance Systems (ADAS) that can evolve through continuous learning and automatic over-the-air (OTA) updates.

The sedan includes adaptive cruise control with stop-and-go function that works in conjunction with a traffic sign detection system, a lane keeping system and a lane departure warning system. The vehicle also features a surround view camera, blind spot assist system, driver assistance system, advanced electronic stability control and automatic parking assist system. Togg's Rush Hour Pilot allows drivers to take their hands off the wheel in heavy traffic at up to 15 km/h so the vehicle moves autonomously.

==== Euro NCAP ====
Euro NCAP test results Togg T10F V2 RWD Long Range (LHD) (2025)
Test	Points	%
Overall:	5 /5 stars	
Adult occupant:	38.0	95%
Child occupant:	42.0	85%
Pedestrian:	49.6	78%
Safety assist:	14.4	80%
