= Togg T10X =

Battery electric compact crossover SUV

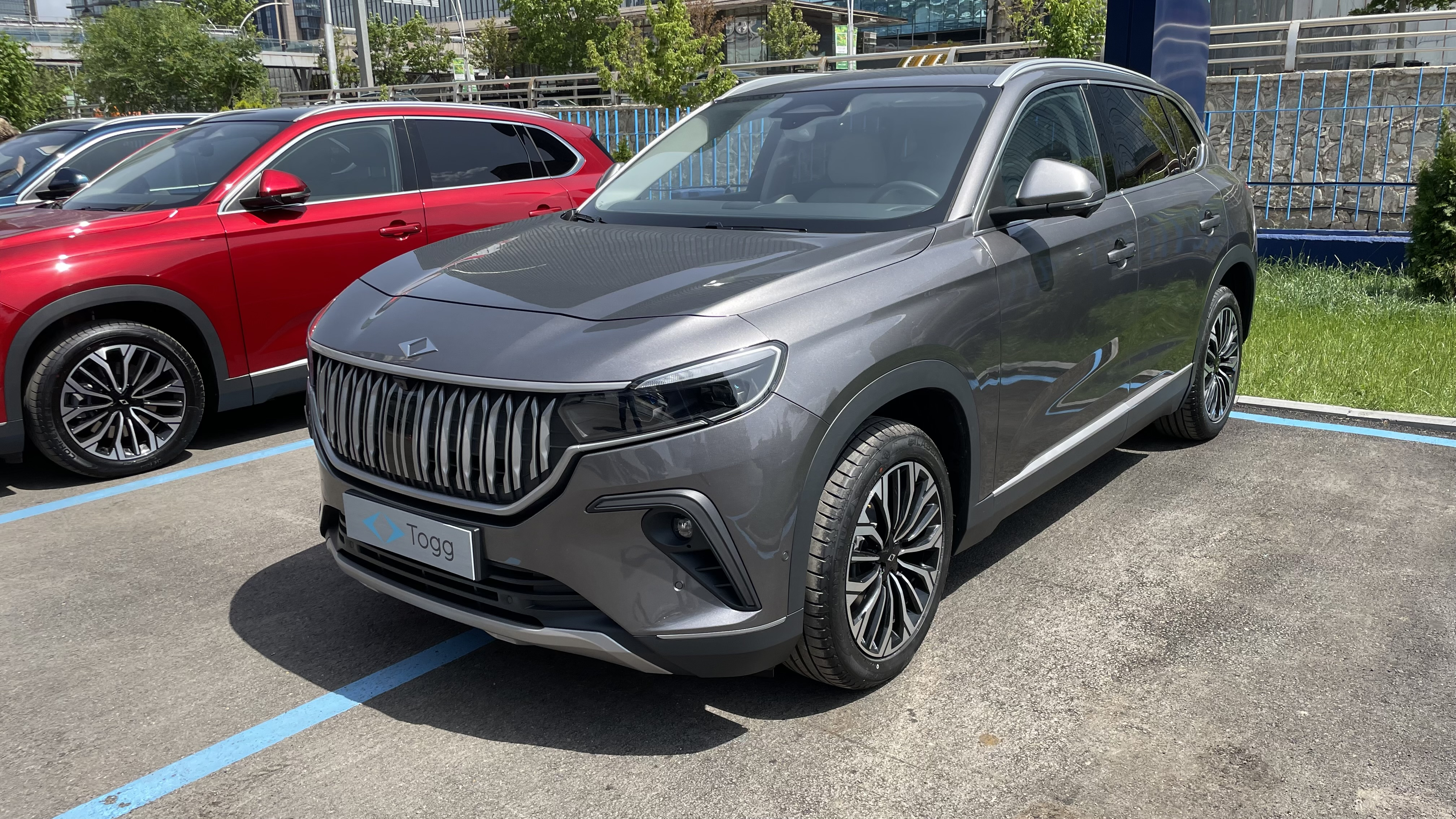

Overview
- Manufacturer: Togg
- Production: October 2022 – present
- Model years: 2023–present
- Assembly: Turkey: Gemlik
- Designer: Pininfarina and Murat Günak

Body and chassis
- Class: Compact crossover SUV (C)
- Body style: 5-door SUV
- Layout: Rear-motor, rear-wheel-drive (RWD); Dual-motor, four-wheel-drive (AWD)
- Related: Togg T10F

Powertrain
- Power output: 160–320 kW (215–429 hp; 218–435 PS)
- Transmission: Single-speed fixed
- Battery: 52.4 kWh NMC Farasis; 88.5 kWh NMC Farasis
- Electric range: 314–523 km (195–325 mi) WLTP
- Plug-in charging: CCS up to 180 kW

Dimensions
- Wheelbase: 2,890 mm (113.8 in)
- Length: 4,599 mm (181.1 in)
- Width: 1,886 mm (74.3 in)
- Height: 1,676 mm (66.0 in)
- Curb weight: 1,947–2,126 kg (4,292–4,687 lb)

The Togg T10X is a battery electric compact crossover SUV produced by the Turkish car manufacturer Togg. Togg started manufacturing the T10X in 2022, which is the first of five electric cars models that are planned to be produced by 2030. Deliveries started in April 2023.

== Naming ==
The T10X has a designation that corresponds to a model code at Togg:

- The "T" refers to Turkey, the vehicle's country of origin, and Togg;
- The "10" stands for compact segment (C);
- The "X" designates the SUV body type.

== Overview ==
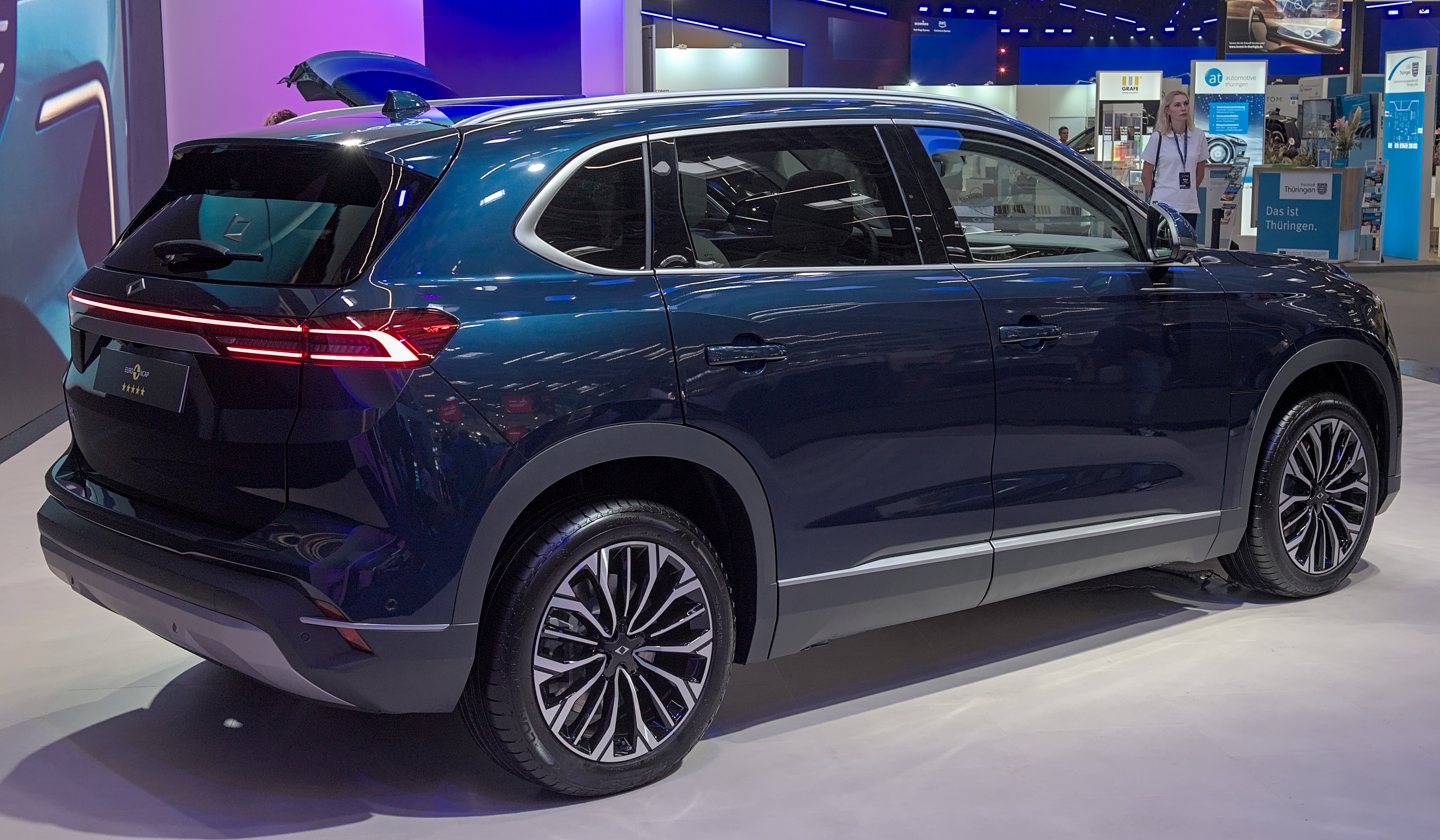
Rear view

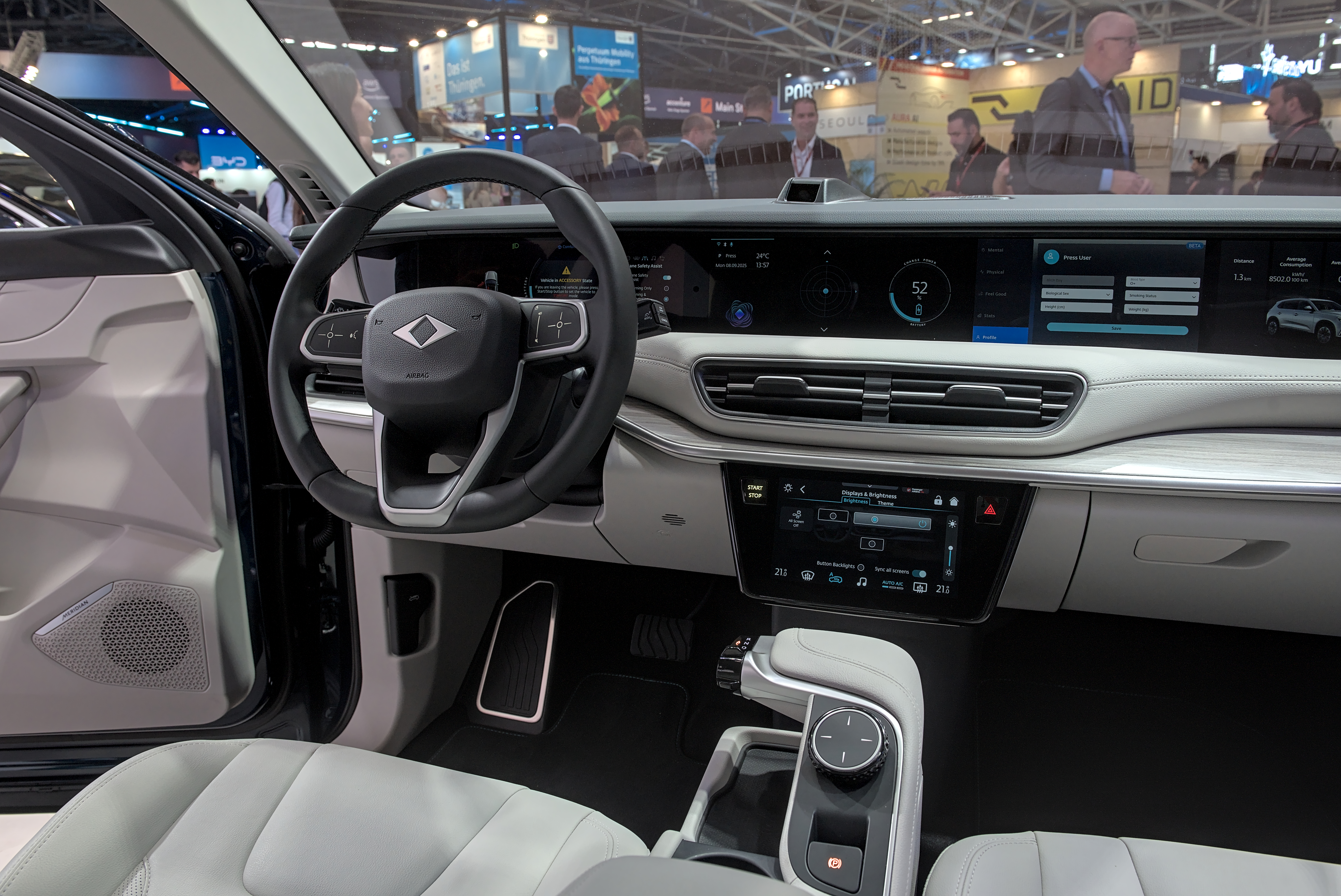
Interior

The vehicle was designed by the Turkish designer Murat Günak in collaboration with Pininfarina, based on Togg's requirements, including a tulip motif. The car was planned to be built on the Saab 9-3's Phoenix 1.0 platform acquired from NEVS in 2015, but later TOGG developed a new platform for the car. The design of the T10X incorporates several elements of Turkish culture, notably the rims and the tulip-shaped grille. Additionally, the stitching lines on the T10X seats also represent a tulip.

=== Interior ===
The T10X has 12-inch digital on-board instrumentation and a central touch screen resting on a 29-inch panoramic panel that covers the entire width of the dashboard. A supplementary second touchscreen is positioned further down for access to the settings. The center console in a floating form has a rotary transmission selector on the side, a button for the electronic parking brake, a regenerative braking control and a touchpad. Standard equipment inside the vehicle also includes an on-board camera with voice activation and control. An infotainment system using artificial intelligence and Togg's Trumore digital platform incorporates a home automation (Smart Living) and ubiquitous technology system allowing the user to perform multiple actions of daily life. Togg offers an optional Meridian sound system inside its SUV.

=== Motors ===
The T10X is offered in two powertrain configurations, namely an electric motor on the rear axle providing rear-wheel drive (RWD) or dual electric motors on the front and rear axles offering all-wheel drive (AWD). The rear-wheel drive (RWD) configuration with an electric motor delivers 160 kW (215 hp; 218 PS) and 350 N⋅m (258 lb⋅ft) of torque, enabling 0–100 km/h (62 mph) in 7.6 seconds. For its part, the configuration in all-wheel drive (AWD) with two electric motors develops a power of 320 kW (429 hp; 435 PS) and 700 N⋅m (516 lb⋅ft) of torque allowing to perform the 0–100 km/h (62 mph) in 4.8 seconds.

	Togg T10X RWD		
	V1 Standard Range	V2 Standard Range	V2 Long Range
Motor power	160 kW (218 PS; 215 hp)		
Torque	350 N⋅m (258 lb⋅ft)		
Layout	Rear-wheel drive (RWD)		
Maximum speed	185 km/h (115 mph)		
0 - 100 km/h (62 mph)	7.4 s		7.8 s
Weight	1,949 kg (4,297 lb)	1,974 kg (4,352 lb)	2,126 kg (4,687 lb)
Brakes	Cooled disc brake		
Suspension	MacPherson		
Battery
Type	Lithium nickel manganese cobalt oxides		
Battery capacity	52.4 kWh		88.5 kWh
Battery range (WLTP)	314 km (195 mi)		523 km (325 mi)
Consumption (kWh/100 km)	16.7		16.9
Charging time
AC charging	195 min		345 min
DC charging	28 min (20 to 80 %)		

=== Batteries ===
Togg offers two battery options for the T10X which correspond to a choice between a lithium-ion battery with a capacity of 52.4 kWh for a range of 314 km (195 mi) and a consumption of 16.7 kWh/100 km, or a larger lithium-ion battery with a capacity of 88.5 kWh providing a range of 523 km (325 mi) for a consumption of 16.9 kWh/100 km. The T10X has a charging capacity of up to 180 kW with a DC charger, allowing the battery to go from 20% to 80% in 28 minutes.

The batteries are produced at Siro in Gemlik, Bursa province. Siro's facilities are located alongside the Togg plant. Siro is a Togg subsidiary (50% owned) established in partnership with energy company Farasis Energy. The battery is guaranteed for 8 years, and Farasis Energy says the cells will last for 1 million kilometres.

== Trim levels ==
The T10X is offered in two trim versions. The entry-level finish, named V1, only has the battery with a capacity of 52.4 kWh while the more luxurious finish, named V2, allows you to choose between the 52.4 kWh battery or the one with more large capacity at 88.5 kWh. Each of the two finishing versions offer a group of options (Launch Package) containing different elements from one version to another.

== Safety ==
Cars sold in the home market are limited to 185 km/h (115 mph). The T10X comes standard with nine airbags and a suite of Advanced Driver Assistance Systems (ADAS) that can evolve through continuous learning and automatic over-the-air (OTA) updates.

Euro NCAP test results Togg T10X LR (Long Range) RWD (LHD) (2025)
Test	Points	%
Overall:	5 /5 stars	
Adult occupant:	38.0	94%
Child occupant:	42.0	85%
Pedestrian:	50.3	79%
Safety assist:	14.4	80%

== Autonomy and communications ==
According to Zorlu, cars will be constantly connected to the internet by 5G. This SUV includes adaptive cruise control with stop-and-go function that works in conjunction with a traffic sign detection system, a lane keeping system, a lane departure warning system, frontal, rear and rear cross-traffic collisions. The vehicle also features a surround view camera, blind spot assist system, driver assistance system, advanced electronic stability control and automatic parking assist system.

== Sales ==
Calendar year	Turkey
2023	19,583
2024	30,093
2025	39,020
