= Devrim (automobile) =

Motor vehicle made in Turkey

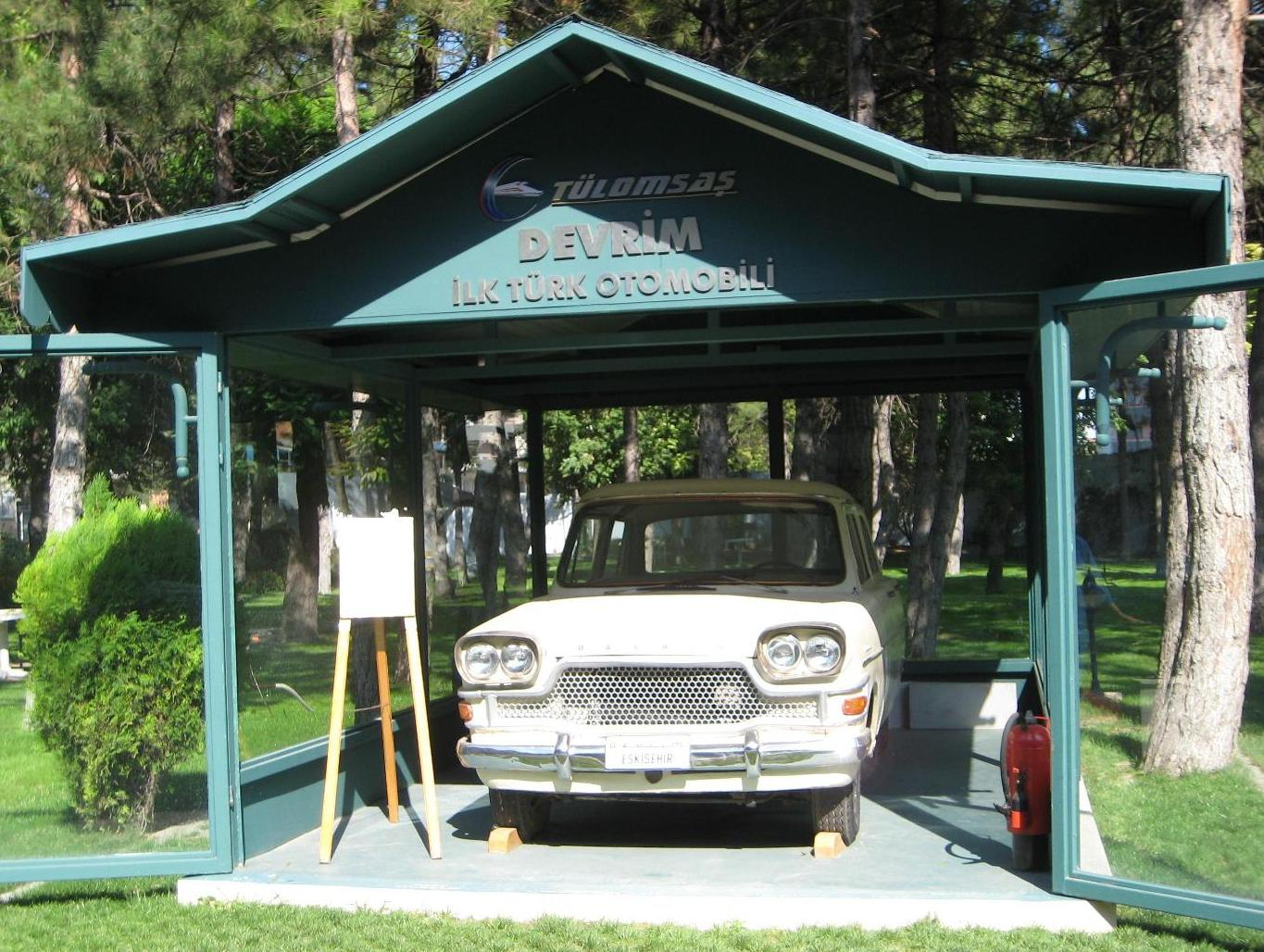
- Last sample of Devrim at TÜLOMSAŞ

Overview
- Manufacturer: Eskişehir Demiryolu Fabrikası (Eskişehir Railway Factory) (TÜLOMSAŞ)
- Production: 4 units
- Model years: 1961
- Assembly: Turkey: Eskişehir
- Designer: Turkish engineers, including: Eng. Nurettin Erguvanlı (M.Sc.); Eng. Ercan Türer (M.Sc.); Architect Kemal Elagöz (M.Sc.)

Body and chassis
- Class: Middle sized, road type
- Body style: 4-door sedan
- Layout: Front engine, rear wheel drive

Powertrain
- Engine: 2000cc carburetted, straight 4 engines, 10 units produced: Type A4L Sidevalve engine, 50 HP at 3650 rpm (4 units); Type A4T Overhead valve engine, 60 HP at 3650 rpm (3 units); Type B3T Overhead valve engine, 70 HP at 3650 rpm (4 units)
- Transmission: 3+1 speed manual, 10 units produced: Type A (3 units); Type B (4 units)

Dimensions
- Length: 4,500 mm (177.2 in)
- Width: 1,800 mm (70.9 in)
- Height: 1,550 mm (61.0 in)
- Curb weight: 1,250 kg (2,756 lb)

Devrim (pronounced [devˈɾim], meaning revolution in Turkish) was the first automobile designed and produced in Turkey.

== Automotive Industry Congress ==
On 15 May 1961, the Otomotiv Endüstri Kongresi (Automotive Industry Congress) was opened by President Cemal Gürsel. In his inaugural speech, he said:

We have to become industrialized with a well-balanced tempo. This is a certain requirement...

When it comes to the automotive industry, a modern country must produce its own transportation vehicles. In today's world transportation vehicles occupy an important place in the economy. We must produce our own transportation vehicles, we must transport with our own vehicles. First, we have to build some of the parts; then, with improvement, we must build up to 70-80% of them.

Some people say that it's impossible to produce automobiles in Turkey. This thought is the product of dark minds. Turkey has many industrial branches that encourage us in this way too...

— Cemal Gürsel

After the congress, Gürsel issued a order to build a prototype engine and car meeting the requirements of the country. These prototypes would be compared with the best cars of the time, the shortcomings would be identified, and project development work would be undertaken in order to produce the best possible car in Turkey.

== Design and production ==
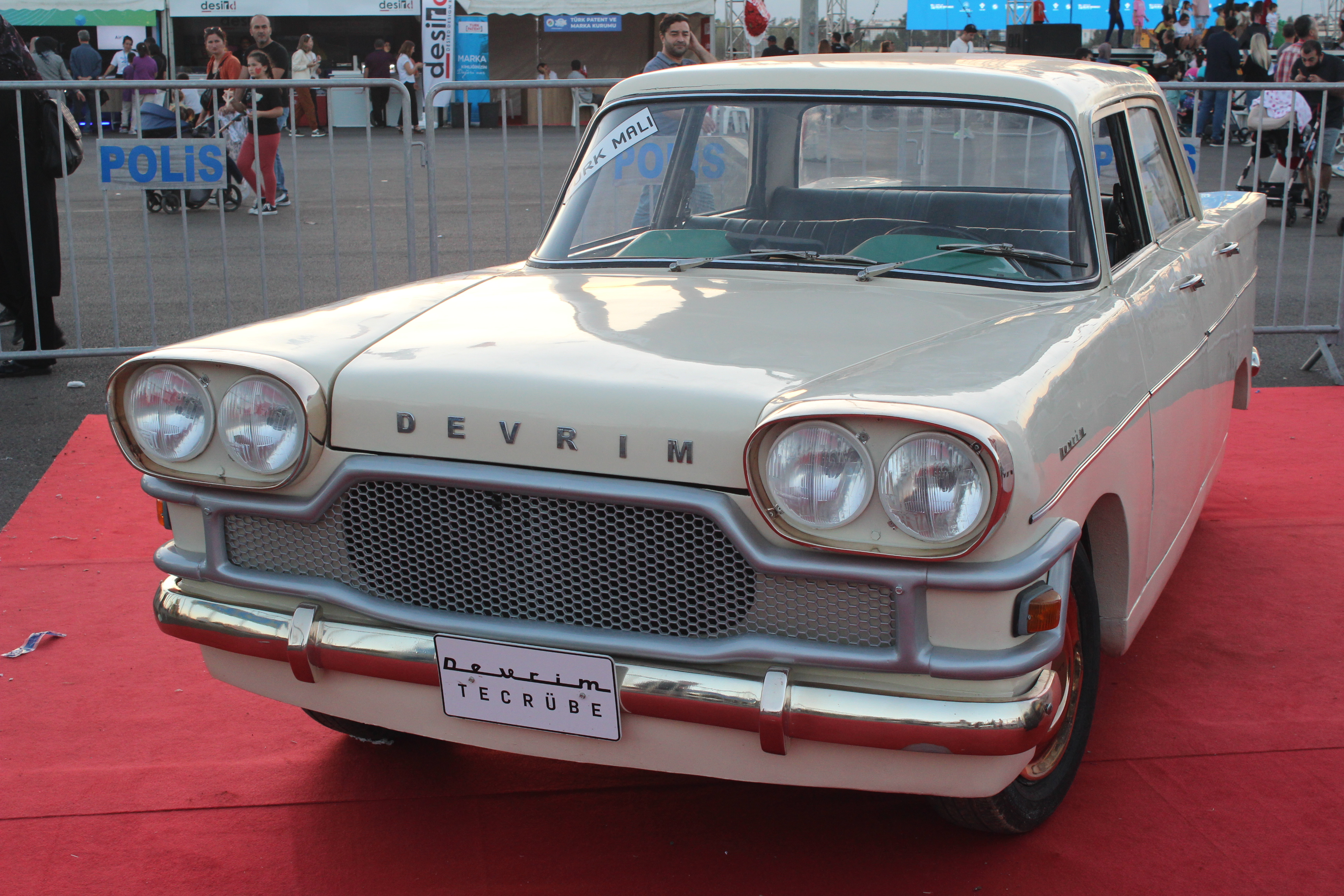
Model on display, 20 October 2013

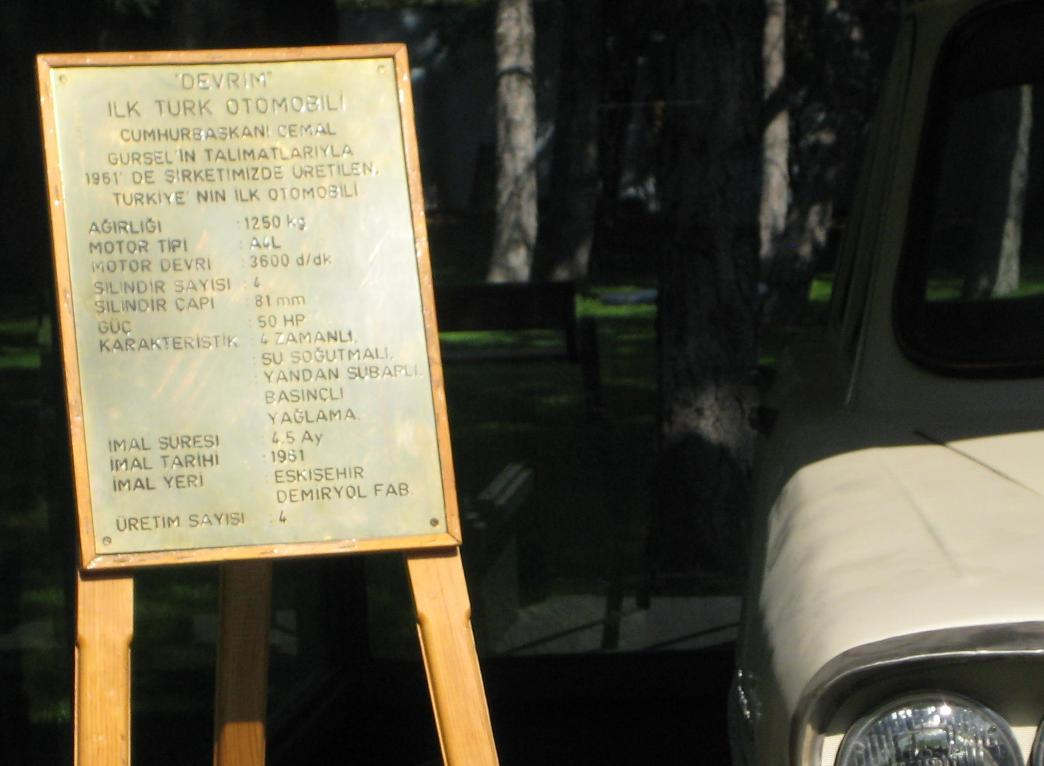
Technical specifications of Devrim

In 1961, President Cemal Gürsel ordered 24 engineers, working in various companies, to build a car fully designed and produced in Turkey, to be demonstrated during the Republic Day celebrations on October 29, 1961.

After 130 days of labor at the workshop in Eskişehir, which later became the TÜLOMSAŞ factory, the engineers managed to make four prototypes of the automobile. It was named Devrim, the Turkish word for revolution.

The schedule was extremely tight; four cars were completed, and two were shipped to Ankara for the Republic Day celebrations. The polishing paint of the one car, painted black, was done while it was on the train to Ankara. The cars were filled with little fuel, intended only for maneuvering. Since the compression rate had been increased to boost engine performance, high-octane fuel, only available in Ankara, was needed to run the engines without engine knock. On the day of the celebrations, President Gürsel attempted to make a ceremonial ride in one model before it was refuelled. The president was able to use the other car, which had been refuelled, to drive to Anıtkabir. The two cars then completed the ceremonial runs without problems.

The vehicle was never mass-produced.

== Legacy ==
Three of the prototypes were scrapped due to the bureaucratic restrictions, with their engines converted to diesel generators, but the last one (body no. 002, engine no. 002) is kept, in working condition inside the TÜLOMSAŞ factory in Eskişehir, where it was built. In 2018, it was completely disassembled and thoroughly maintained by TÜLOMSAŞ for continued preservation. Since it was preserved in a closed showroom, very little rust was observed; though paint and vinyl interiors had to be replaced according to original specifications of the car.

The story of the building process and the efforts of the 24 engineers who worked on the model were related in the film Devrim Arabaları (English: Cars of the Revolution), released 2008.

In late 2010, students from the National University of Science and Technology in Pakistan developed a hybrid car named Devrim II, drawing inspiration from Devrim.
