= Top Marques Monaco =

Annual exhibition in Monte Carlo

- Status: Active
- Genre: Supercar show and luxury fair
- Frequency: Annually
- Venue: Grimaldi Forum
- Locations: 10 Avenue Princesse Grace; 98000 Monaco
- Coordinates: 43°44′37″N 7°25′54″E
- Country: Monaco
- Years active: 2004–present
- Inaugurated: April 22, 2004–April 25, 2004
- Founders: Lawrie Lewis, Manoj Bairstow
- Most recent: May 30, 2019–June 3, 2019
- Next event: May 7, 2025–May 11, 2025
- Attendance: 35,000 (2014)
- Patron: Albert II, Prince of Monaco
- Website: topmarquesmonaco.com

Top Marques Monaco is an event that takes place annually at the Grimaldi Forum in the principality of Monaco. It features exhibitions by numerous purveyors of luxury aircraft, automobile, boat, watches, jewellery etc. A quarter of the event's ticket sales are donated to Monaco Aide et Présence, a charity established by Monaco's reigning Prince Albert.

== 2010 ==
Sales during the event totalled US$600 million (446 million euros). The entrance fee was 50 euros.

== 2011 ==
At the four-day 2011 event, there were 42 automotive manufacturers exhibiting luxury vehicles, 13 manufacturers exhibiting luxury yachts and other boats, and 26 jewelry manufacturers exhibiting watches. Exhibitors included Bugatti, Dartz, Exagon Engineering, Gillet, GTA Motor, Koenigsegg, Noble Automotive, Pagani, and Peraves. Six cars made their European debuts, including the Conquest Knight XV SUV and the Keating ZKR. A hundred cars were on display, of which more than two dozen were available for test drives. The entrance fee was 50 euros. Attendance was 33,000 people from twelve countries.

== 2013 ==
The four-day 2013 Top Marques Monaco featured six supercar debuts, including ABT Sportsline, Hamann Motorsport, Mansory, and MTM, and exhibitions by over 150 companies. Supercars on display included the GTA Spano, the Gumpert Apollo, the Koenigsegg Hundra, the Mazzanti Evantra, the Noble Automotive M600, the Roding Automobile Roadster, the Savage Rivale, the Soleil Motors Anadi, and the Vencer Sarthe. Other exhibitors included Aston Martin, Bentley, Ferrari, Fisker, Jaguar, Lamborghini, Pagani, Rolls-Royce, Ronn Motor Company, Vintech, and Wiesmann.

== 2014 ==
Running from 17–20 April, 2014's Top Marques Monaco was attended by Prince Albert of Monaco, Loris Capirossi, and a total of more than 35,000 other attendees. Vehicles premiered included David Brown Automotive's Speedback, Energica Motor Company's Ego 45 motorcycle, NanoFlowcell's Quant e-Sportlimousine, and W Motors's Lykan HyperSport. Other vehicles on display included cars manufactured by Aston Martin, Audi, BMW, Bugatti, Ferrari, Hamann Motorsport, Mazzanti Automobili, Mercedes-Benz, Pagani, Porsche, Tesla Motors, and Zenvo; and the Energica Motor Company's Eco, Forza·G's Icaro and Demonio, and Mando's Footloose e-bicycles. VIP ticket-holders had the opportunity to use a 3D virtual studio to try their hands at designing a supercar. Other exhibitors had jet-propelled hovercraft and powered surfboards on display. The entrance fee was 50 euros.

== 2015 ==
Automotive exhibitors included BMW, Ferrari, Lamborghini, McLaren, Mercedes, Nimrod Performance, Porsche, Tesla and Zenvo. Larte Design's Tesla Model S and Toroidion's 1MW had their world premieres there, as did the AeroMobil 3.0, a Slovak-made road-legal vehicle that transforms into a light aircraft.

== 2016 ==
The theme of Top Marques Monaco 2016 was James Bond; supercars from the film Spectre, as well as an Aston Martin DB5 as seen in Goldfinger, were on display along with props from the franchise.

== 2017 ==
AeroMobil s.r.o. unveiled the production model of its AeroMobil flying car, announcing that it would begin taking pre-orders for the vehicle before the end of 2017. Other exhibitors, including Donkervoort D8 GTO-RS, Vanda Dendrobium, and Calafiore C10 had their world premieres. The Jean Boulle Luxury Group announced that its patent-pending luxury diamond finish technology had been applied to a classic Pininfarina-styled Bentley, the Bentley Azure exhibited that year. The Boulle Luxury Bentley Azure was unveiled by Albert II, Prince of Monaco on 20 April at the official opening of Top Marques 2017.
