= Don Vebole =

French car stylist (born 1985)

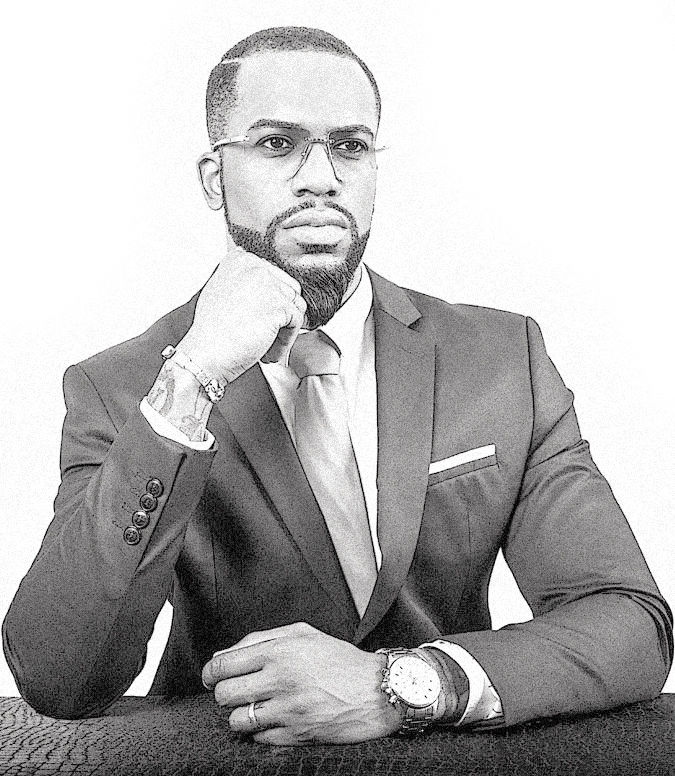
- Born: 1985 (age 40–41)
- Occupations: Entrepreneur, car designer
- Known for: Taurus World Angels
- Website: don-vebole.com

Don Vebole (born in February 1985) is a French car stylist. Raised in the Parisian suburb of Seine et Marne.

== Early life and education ==
Following the break up of his parents, at 16, in order to help his family, he used his mechanical knowledge and painting and his inventive capacity to exercise his talent for customization and modification on mopeds and other two wheels mechanics of his relatives.

== Career ==
After obtaining his Bachelor in 2004, he moved to Tampa Florida to perfect his customization techniques on luxury vehicles. After overcoming many challenges and obstacles and before his return to France in 2007, Don Vebole created Taurus USA. His creation was showcased at Tuning Show, the French car show in Paris in the city of Le Bourget .

In 2009, after participating only in two Parisian, French car shows, the director of the house Hamann Motorsport approached him to become the official distributor of the brand in France and Monaco.

After 3 years at Hamann Motorsport, he decided to focus on developing and manufacturing his own brand with regards to parts and high-end automotive accessories.
