= Mazzanti Evantra =

High-performance motor vehicle

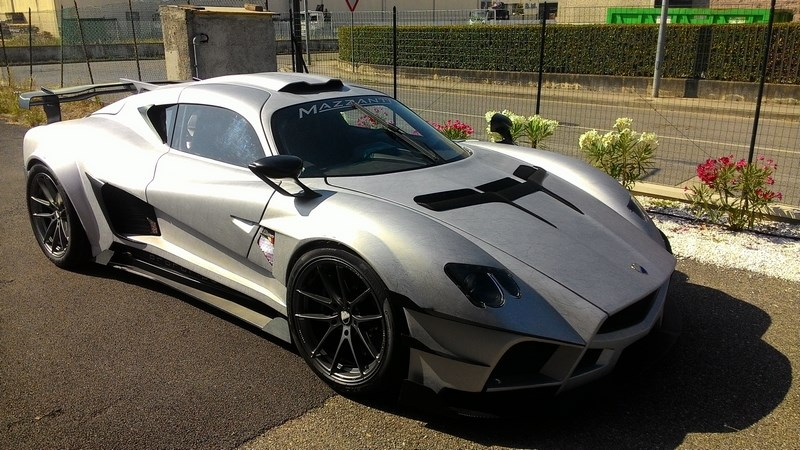
- Mazzanti Evantra Millecavalli

Overview
- Manufacturer: Mazzanti Automobili
- Production: 2013–2023
- Assembly: Italy: Pontedera
- Designer: Luca Mazzanti; Zsolt Tarnok

Body and chassis
- Class: Sports car (S)
- Body style: 2-door coupé
- Layout: Longitudinal rear mid-engine, rear-wheel drive
- Doors: Suicide-swan

Powertrain
- Engine: 7.0L LS7 (Evantra, 771); 7.2L LS7-based twin-turbo V8 (Millecavalli); 7.4L LS7-based twin-turbo V8 (Millecavalli R); 6.2L LT2 supercharged V8 (Pura, 781)
- Power output: 701 PS (691 hp; 516 kW) (Evantra Prototype); 751 PS (741 hp; 552 kW) (Evantra); 771 PS (760 hp; 567 kW) (771); 781 PS (770 hp; 574 kW) (781); 761 PS (751 hp; 560 kW) (Pura); 1,000 PS (986 hp; 735 kW) (Millecavalli); 1,121 PS (1,106 hp; 824 kW) (Millecavalli R)
- Transmission: 6-speed sequential (Evantra, Millecavalli, Millecavalli R); 7-speed sequential (771, 781); 7-speed manual (Pura)

Dimensions
- Wheelbase: 2,550 mm (100.4 in)
- Length: 4,325 mm (170.3 in) (Evantra, 771, 781, Pura); 4,425 mm (174.2 in) (Millecavalli, Millecavalli R)
- Width: 1,955 mm (77.0 in) (Evantra, 771, 781, Pura); 2,008 mm (79.1 in) (Millecavalli, Millecavalli R)
- Height: 1,225 mm (48.2 in)
- Curb weight: 1,300 kg (2,866 lb) (Millecavalli, Evantra, 771); 1,380 kg (3,042 lb) (Millecavalli R); 1,350 kg (2,976 lb) (781); 1,290 kg (2,844 lb) (Pura)

The Mazzanti Evantra is a high-performance limited production sports car made by Italian automobile manufacturer Mazzanti Automobili. The car premiered at the Top Marques Show Monaco in 2013 and has had several subsequent variants produced. The Evantra is produced on commission, in a maximum of five units per year.

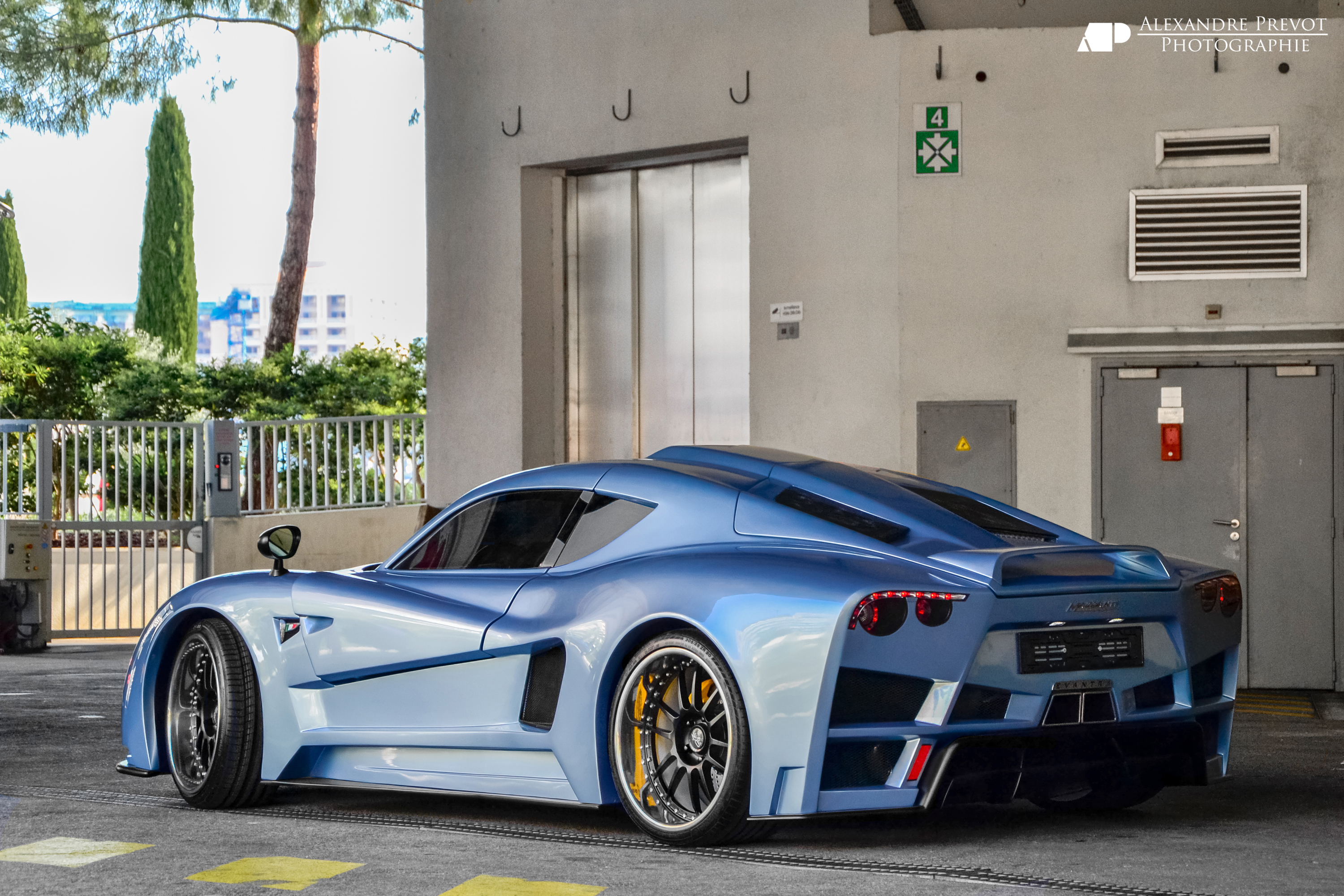
Evantra rear end

== Development and production ==
In 2011 Luca Mazzanti, after three years of design work, supported from the designer Zsolt Tarnok, presented the project "Evantra" which is a mid-engine coupé designed to be produced in a very limited number and customizable according to the customer's specifications. During 2012, Mazzanti developed 1:1 scale models of the Evantra and began the construction of the very first unit. The final test of Evantra happened in circuit at Autodromo di Modena. In 2013, the Mazzanti Evantra was unveiled in a World premiere during the Top Marques Monaco Show. The name Evantra, as tradition of Mazzanti Automobili, derives from the Etruscan language and it combines the concepts of unity and eternity: historically, Evantra was a name given by the Etruscans to the goddess of immortality. The car is produced in Pontedera, Tuscany, Italy, in a maximum of five units per year

== Specifications ==
=== Chassis ===
The boxed steel chassis is joined to a cage of chrome-molybdenum tubes creating the framework inside the vehicle. Another cage connects the engine/gearbox compartment to rear shocks attacks. These solutions contribute significantly to the structural rigidity of the chassis and contribute to occupant safety.

=== Bodywork ===
The body is structurally a two-seater coupé. The same body is built in two different types of equipment: pro-body, which made entirely of carbon fiber and one-body, which is built from the same material with some parts built from hand-wrought aluminium.

=== Interior ===
The interiors are built to order as per the customer specifications. The sporty central console, has an instrument panel equipped with a multimedia system and data acquisition trim. The engine start button is placed on the integrated bridge to the pavilion in the Mazzanti style as seen on the Antas. The car offers a choice of two driving modes, namely "Race" and "Road".

=== Engine ===
The engine is a naturally aspirated, 7.0-liter aluminum Chevrolet LS7 V8 engine that produces 701 PS (691 hp; 516 kW) at 6,600 rpm and a maximum torque of 848 N⋅m (625 lb⋅ft) at 4,500 rpm. But during prototyping and testing, Mazzanti engineers were able to extract a further 50 HP from the engine. For final production version, the engine produces 751 PS (741 hp; 552 kW) at 7,500 rpm, and a maximum torque of 860 N⋅m (634 lb⋅ft) at 5,000 rpm. The engine has a compression ratio of 11: 1 and is equipped with dry-sump lubrication system, titanium valves and connecting rods.

=== Performance ===
The Evantra V8 is equipped with a 6-speed sequential gearbox and can reach a top speed exceeding 350 km/h (217 mph) with acceleration from 0–100 km/h (62 mph) taking about 3.2 seconds. The aerodynamic development was realised with the support of partners with significant background in F1 and Le Mans. The car is equipped with stock high performance tires 255/30 R20 front and 325/25 R20 rear, mounted on specific 20" OZ Racing wheels, and controlled by a Brembo braking system with carbon-ceramic 380 mm discs and 6-piston calipers at the front and 360 mm discs and 4-piston calipers at the rear.

== Variants ==
=== Evantra 771 ===
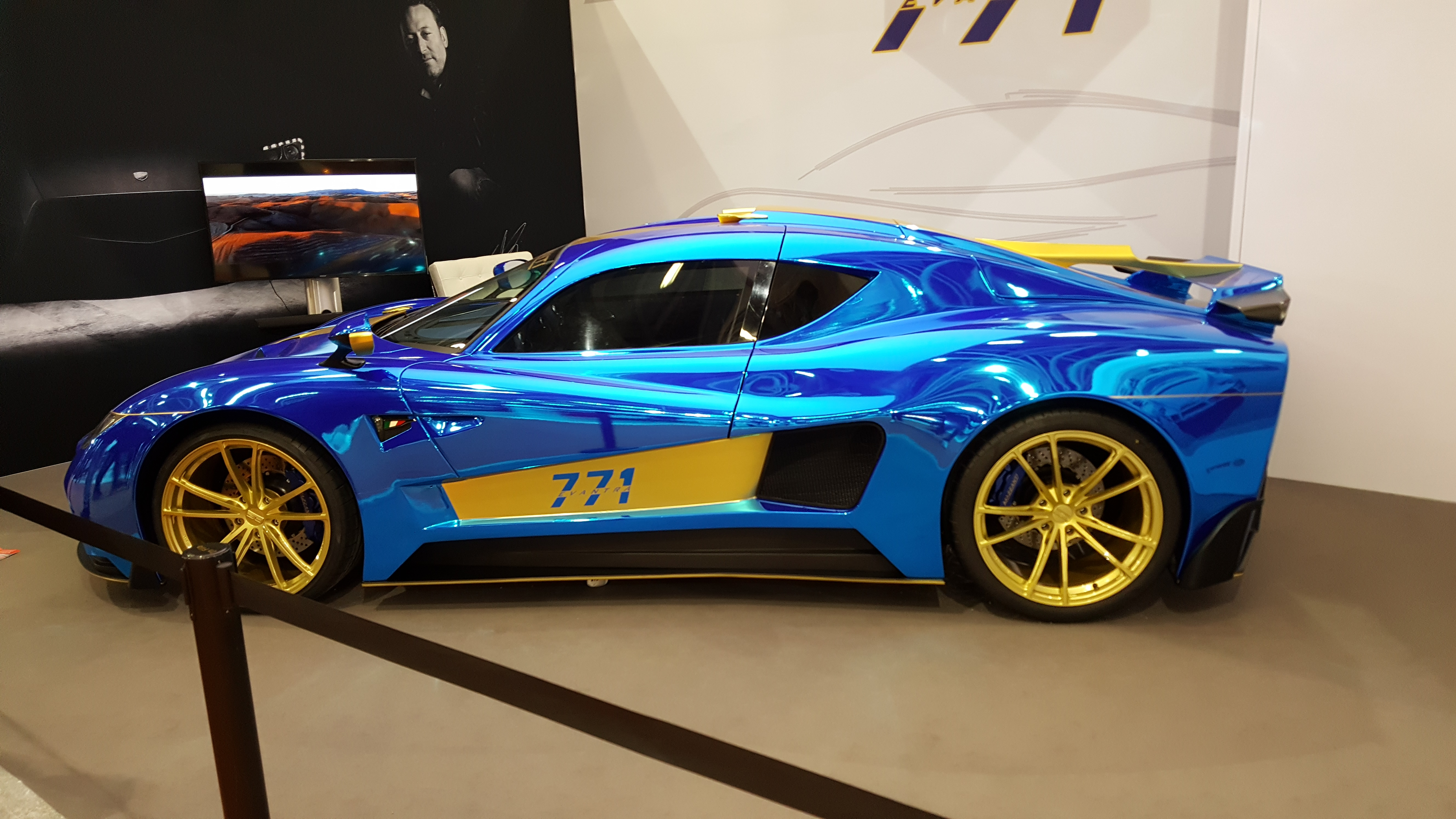
Evantra 771

The Evantra 771 was unveiled at the 2016 Bologna Motor Show, as an evolution of the Evantra. The LS7 used in the base Evantra has been modified to produce an extra 20 hp and the newly revised engine now produces 771 PS (760 hp; 567 kW) at 7,700 RPM and 642 lb⋅ft (870 N⋅m) at 6,890 RPM hence the nomenclature. It has a claimed top speed of 336 km/h (209 mph), and a 0–97 km/h (0–60 mph) acceleration time of around 3 seconds. Power is sent to the rear wheels via a 7-speed sequential transmission. The light weight OZ racing wheels measure 12 in (30 cm) by 20 in (51 cm) at the rear, 9.5 in (24 cm) by 20 in (51 cm) at the front and are fitted with 325/25R20 & 255/30R20 Pirelli P Zeroes tyres respectively. Stopping power is provided by 380 mm (15 in) rotors with 6-piston calipers at the front and 360 mm (14.2 in) rotors with 4-piston calipers at the rear, with carbon-ceramic brakes being optional. MacPherson struts at all four corners are responsible for ride stability. Sales began in the spring of 2017, and like all other Mazzanti models was limited to a production run of 5 per year.

==== Evantra 781 ====
The 781 is an evolution of the 771, replacing the 7.0L LS7 with the same engine found in the Pura, a 6.2L LT2. The engine produces 781 PS (770 hp; 574 kW) at 6,400 RPM and 969 N⋅m (715 lb⋅ft) at 4,400 RPM. The suspension has been altered, replacing the MacPherson struts with fully adjustable double wishbone suspension at both front and rear wheels. Weight has also increased slightly from the 771, from 1,300 kg (2,866 lb) to 1,350 kg (2,976 lb). The 781 retains everything from the 771 apart from the engine & suspension tweaks, and the interior retains its basic layout.

=== Evantra Millecavalli ===
The Evantra Millecavalli was unveiled at the Salone Auto Torino in 2016. The 7.0L LS7 found in the 771 has been enlarged to 7.2L, and fitted with a pair of turbochargers, and now produces 1,000 PS (986 hp; 735 kW), hence the name, with Mille meaning thousand & cavalli meaning horses. Sending that 1,000 PS and 1,200 N⋅m (885 lb⋅ft) to the rear wheels is a bespoke 6-speed sequential, which gives the car a claimed 0–97 km/h (0–60 mph) acceleration time of 2.7 second, and an estimated top speed of 402 km/h (250 mph). Again, OZ Racing supplies the wheels which are the same size as the 771 wheels, and are fitted with Pirelli Trofeo R tyres, 265/35R19 at the front and 335/30R20 at the rear. Stopping power is provided by 390 mm (15 in) rotors and six-piston calipers at the front, and 360 mm (14 in) rotors and four-piston calipers at the rear, with carbon-ceramic brakes being standard. Mazzanti claims that this can bring the car from 300 km/h (186 mph) to a stop in 7 seconds.

==== Millecavalli R ====
The R is a high performance variant of the Millecavalli. The LS7 has been further enlarged to 7.4 L, now producing 1,121 PS (1,106 hp; 824 kW) at 6,500 RPM and 1,210 N⋅m (892 lb⋅ft) at 6,500 RPM. All measurements of the car also remain the same, however the R has gone under further aerodynamic enhancement for track performance and has gained 80 kg (176 lb), increasing the weight from 1,300 kg (2,866 lb) to 1,380 kg (3,042 lb). The OEM tyres are also now Michelin instead of Pirelli.

=== Evantra Pura ===
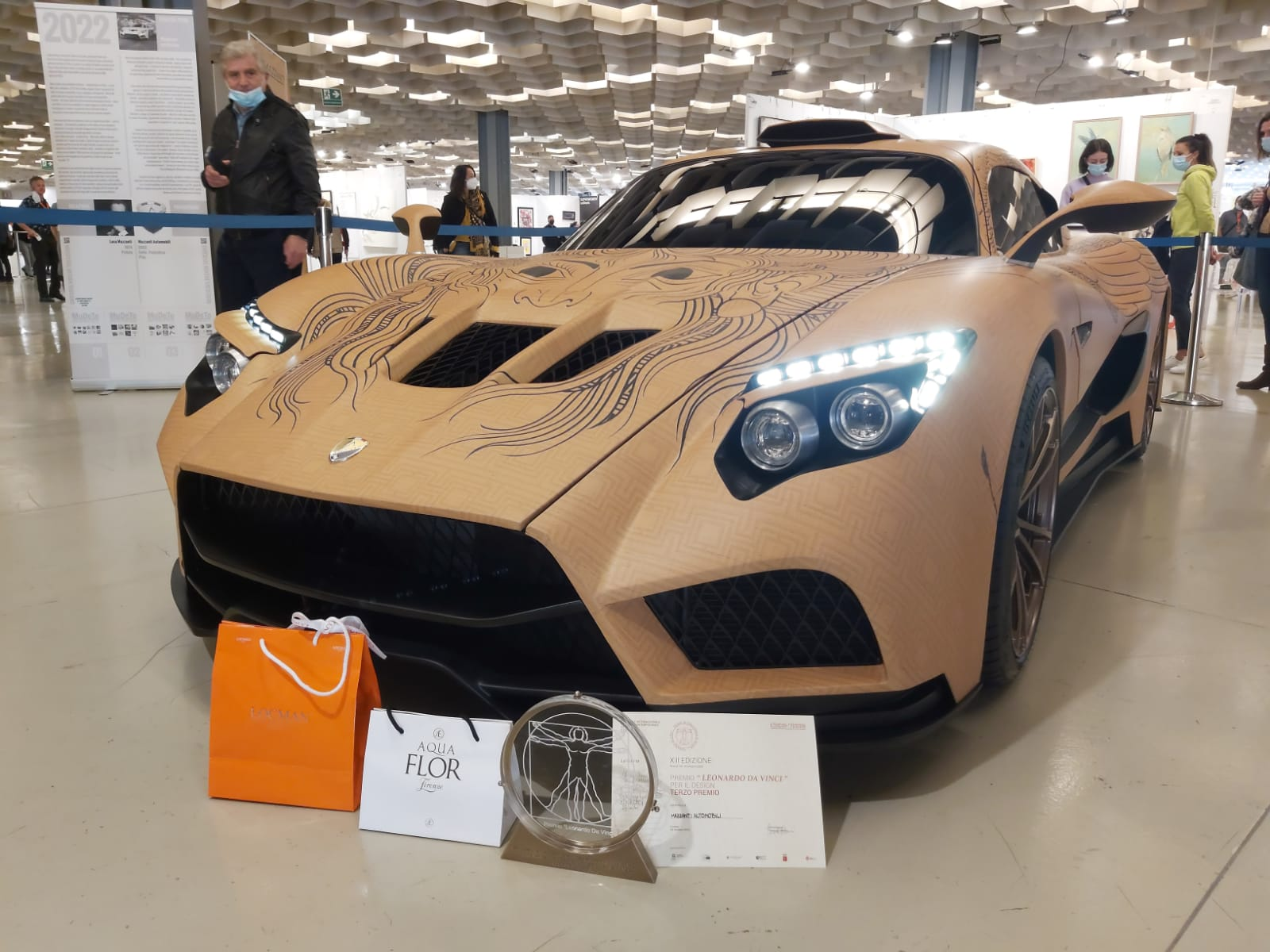
Evantra Pura

The Evantra Pura was unveiled at the 2021 Florence Biennale art festival in Florence. It shares its engine with the 781, that being a supercharged 6.2L LT2 that produces 761 PS (751 hp; 560 kW) at 6,300 RPM and 910 N⋅m (671 lb⋅ft) at 4,300 RPM. The manufacturer claims that the Pura can accelerate from 0–100 km/h (0–62 mph) in 2.9 seconds, with a top speed of over 360 km/h (224 mph). The Pura is considered the entry model within the Evantra series and has more emphasis on lightness and sheer driving pleasure, in fact the car weighs only 1,290 kg (2,844 lb), with the chassis being made of high-tensile steel, and molybdenum chrome which allows for flexibility in the corners. The car has MacPherson struts at each corner of the vehicle with fully adjustable suspension as an option. Stopping power is provided by provided by carbon-ceramic Brembos, with 6-piston calipers and 14.9 in (378 mm) rotors at the front, and 4-piston calipers and 14 in (356 mm) rotors at the rear. The car is fitted with OZ Racing wheels, with the fronts measuring 9.5 in (24 cm) by 19 in (48 cm) at the front and 12 in (30 cm) by 20 in (51 cm) at the rear, fitted with 255/35R19 and 315/30R20 Michelin rubber respectively. Power is sent to the rear wheels via a 7-speed sequential paddle-shift gearbox.

== Appearances in other media ==
The Mazzanti Evantra and Millecavalli are available to play in the desktop/mobile racing game Asphalt 8: Airborne, and the Millecavalli is also available in Asphalt 9: Legends and CSR Racing 2. The Evantra can be found in Gear Club Unlimited 3. It is also in an online browser game called NextDrive. It can be found on PacoGames.
