= Ronn Motor Group =

Car manufacturer based in Scottsdale, Arizona

RONN Motor Group
- Formerly: Ronn Motor Company
- Industry: Automaker
- Founder: Ronn Ford
- Headquarters: Scottsdale, Arizona
- Website: ronnmotorgroup.com

RONN Motor Group (RONN) is an (OTC traded $RONN) automaker based in Scottsdale, Arizona.

== History ==
RONN Motor Group was founded in 2007 when founder Ronn Ford came up with the idea for the company's first car, the RONN Scorpion. Mr. Ford was inspired by a business trip to China when he saw the growing demand for vehicles and knew carbon-burning cars would not be sustainable. He wrote up a business plan that November, and started physical development of the production prototype in March 2008.

The RONN Scorpion debuted in Europe at the Top Marques Monaco in 2009. That same year, the prototype was taken to California where it was displayed at the California State Capitol. California's Governor Arnold Schwarzenegger test drove the vehicle. Production was scheduled to begin in late 2009 and was originally set for 200 cars to be produced annually.

In August 2015, RMG partnered with Gray Design to combine its super performance car with superyachts for marketing to clients of Gray Design.The Fairwei superyacht will be matched with the 2017 RMG Bird of Prey. The Bird of Prey, a hybrid car featuring Formula One electric drive technology, was offered exclusively as part of the collaboration.

RMG began equity crowdfunding in 2015 through Regulation A+. In August 2015, the company announced production of the Scorpion 2.0.

== RONN Scorpion ==
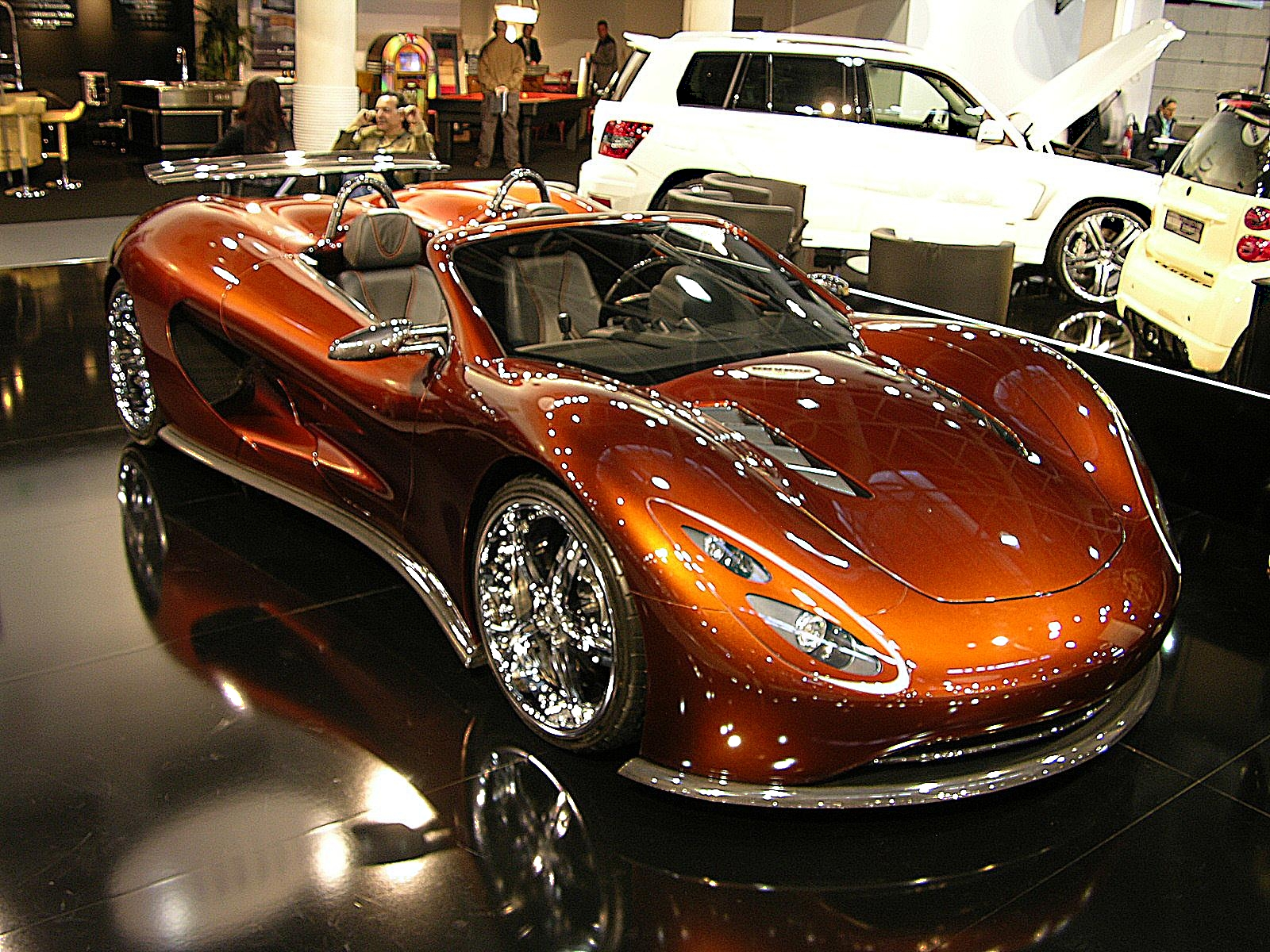
Ronn Scorpion

Mr. Ford designed the body of the Scorpion, which is powered by a 450-horsepower 3.5 liter twin-turbo V6 engine and uses "hydrogen fuel injection" to increase fuel mileage and reduce carbon emission. The Scorpion runs off a 40:60 ratio of hydrogen and gasoline. An integrated 1.5 liter water tank produces hydrogen through electrolysis, which is then added to the combustion chamber. The hydrogen bonds with carbon molecules which allows them to burn in the cylinder. The Scorpion's hydrogen injection system was built by RMG's COO, Damon Kuhn. RONN claims the car can reach 200 miles per hour and can accelerate from 0-60 mph (97 km/h) in 3.5 seconds. It averages 40 miles per gallon.

The Scorpion has a stainless steel frame and the body is made of carbon fiber. The original body prototype was produced by Metalcrafters, a company based in Fountain Valley, California. It was produced directly from the CAD rendering without using the traditional clay model.
