= Spania GTA Spano =

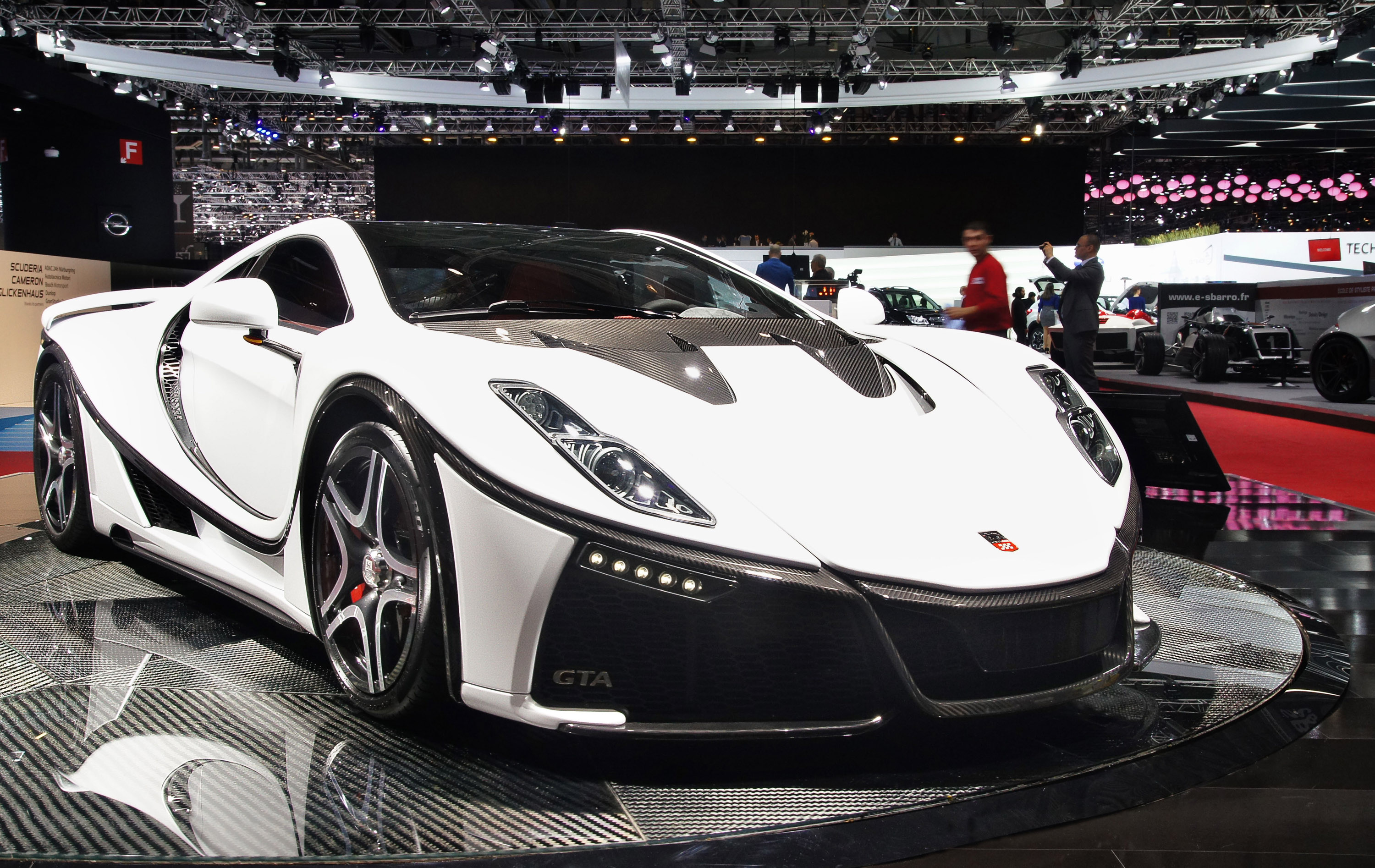
- Spania GTA Spano (second generation)

Overview
- Manufacturer: Spania GTA
- Production: 2012–present
- Assembly: Riba-roja de Túria, Valencia, Spain
- Designer: Domingo Ochoa; Sento Pallardó

Body and chassis
- Class: Sports car (S)
- Body style: 2-door coupé
- Layout: Rear-mid engine, rear-wheel-drive
- Doors: Swan doors (first generation); Butterfly doors (second generation)

Powertrain
- Engine: 8.3 L supercharged Viper V10; 8.4 L twin-turbocharged Viper V10; 8.0 L twin-turbocharged Viper V10
- Power output: 780–925 PS (574–680 kW)
- Transmission: 7-speed manual; 7-speed automated manual

Dimensions
- Wheelbase: 2,800 mm (110 in)
- Length: 4,600 mm (181 in) (Gen. I); 4,680 mm (184 in) (Gen. II)
- Width: 1,980 mm (78 in)
- Height: 1,180 mm (46 in)
- Curb weight: 1,350 kg (2,976 lb) (first generation); 1,400 kg (3,086 lb) (second generation)

The Spania GTA Spano is a limited-production sports car produced by Spanish automobile manufacturer Spania GTA, a sister company to GTA Motor Competición. Only 99 units of the GTA Spano are expected to be built.

== Development ==
After 15 years of racing experience in various leagues with Spania GTA Competición, team director Domingo Ochoa wanted to pursue his goal of bringing a Spanish sports car into production. On 29 April 2009, After five years in development, the GTA Spano was first presented to a select group at L'Hemisfèric in the City of Arts and Sciences, Valencia. This pre-production model used an 8.3 L supercharged Viper V10 engine, rated at 780 PS (574 kW) and 920 N⋅m (679 lb⋅ft) of torque on regular pump gas and up to 820 PS (603 kW) on E85 biofuel.

The GTA Spano was first displayed to the public at the 2010 Top Marques Monaco exhibition. It was displayed with the same specifications as the previous year's prototype. The Spano GTA made its first Geneva Motor Show appearance the following year, in March 2011. This version of the car also used the 8.3 L V10, with three transmission options: a 7-speed automated manual, a 7-speed automated manual, with paddle-shifters, and a 7-speed manual.

== First generation (2013–2015) ==
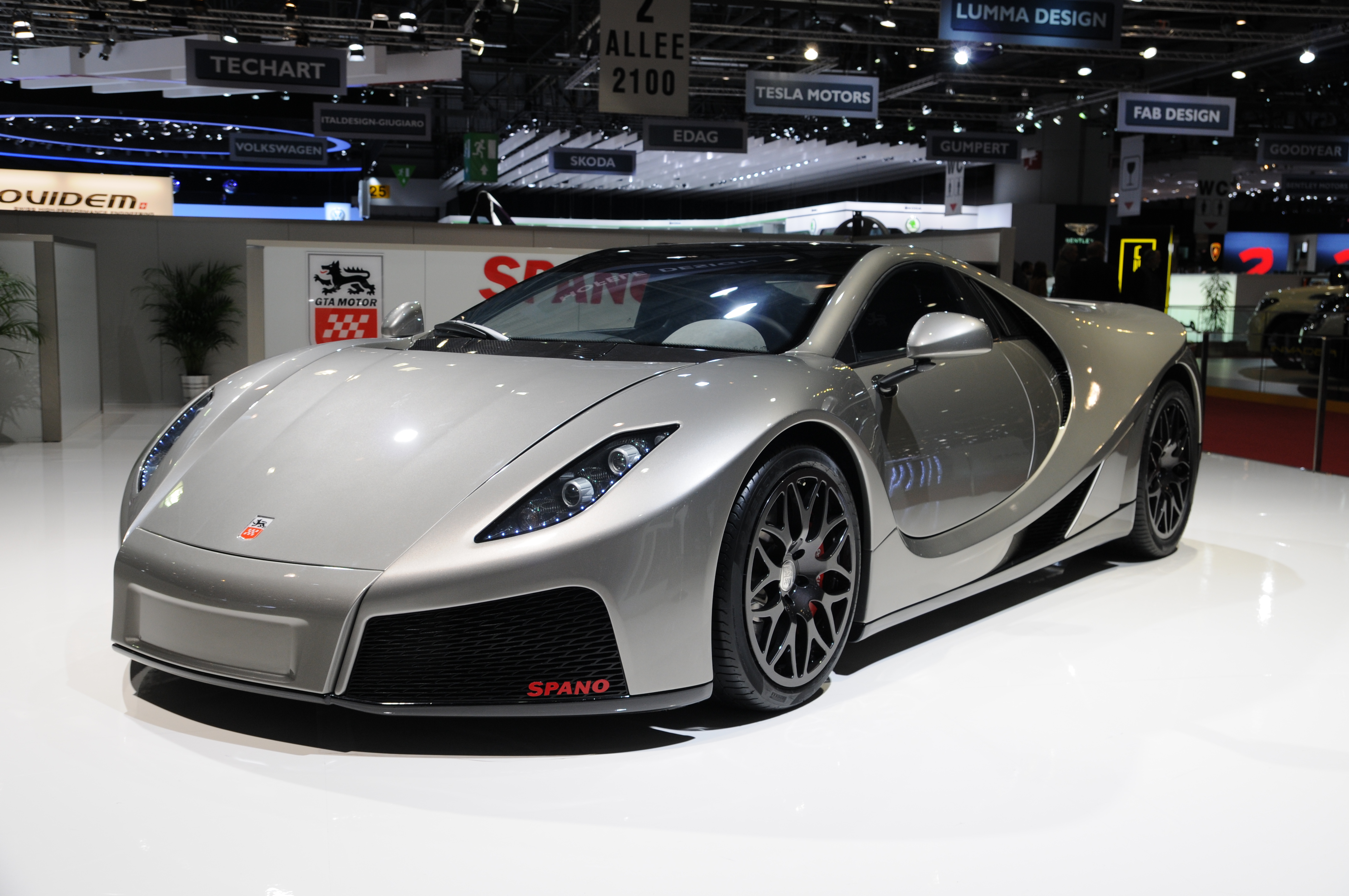
GTA Spano (first generation)

The production version of the GTA Spano was unveiled at the 2013 Geneva Motor Show, four years after the initial presentation of the prototype in Valencia. This version of the car used a revised, twin-turbocharged version of the V10 engine now displacing 8.4 L and rated at 900 PS (662 kW) and 1,000 N⋅m (738 lb⋅ft) torque. Only two of the original three transmission options were available for the production version of the GTA Spano; the 7-speed automated manual and the 7-speed manual. According to the manufacturer, performance figures for the first generation GTA Spano were estimated to be 0–97 km/h (60 mph) acceleration time of 2.9 seconds, and a top speed of 350 km/h (217 mph).

== Second generation (2015–present) ==
At the 2015 Geneva Motor Show, Spania GTA introduced an overhauled version of the GTA Spano. Several internal and external changes were made to differentiate this from the first generation model, including completely revised styling. Like the pre-production model, the second generation's Viper V10 is twin-turbocharged, however it is now rated at 925 PS (680 kW) and 1,220 N⋅m (900 lb⋅ft) of torque. The only transmission now offered is a new 7-speed paddle-shift automated manual, produced by CIMA.

In the development of the second generation of the GTA Spano, Spania GTA partnered with Spanish nanotechnology firm Graphenano to incorporate graphene materials into the car's chassis. The manufacturer claims that the use of graphene in the bodywork increases the car's structural rigidity and decreases weight. The second generation car also features more extensive use of carbon fiber body panels. The new GTA Spano is estimated by the manufacturer to accelerate from 0–97 km/h (60 mph) in 2.9 seconds, and achieve a top speed of 370 km/h (230 mph).

== Specifications ==
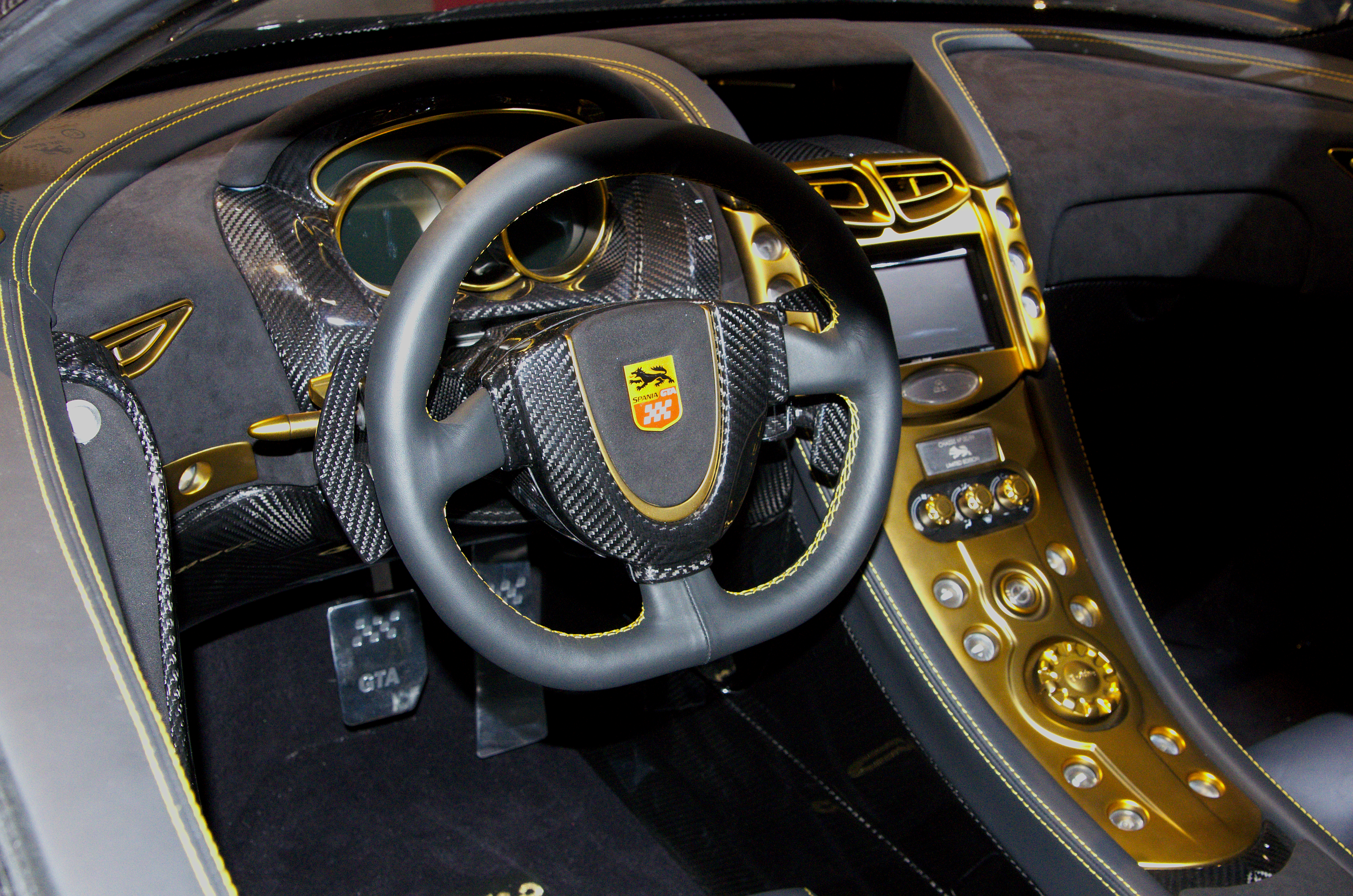
Interior

=== Chassis ===
The GTA Spano utilises a monocoque chassis design, manufactured from carbon fibre and reinforced with titanium and Kevlar composites. The second generation model also introduces graphene elements into this design, for the purpose of added chassis stiffness and rigidity.

=== Suspension ===
Both first and second generation models of the GTA Spano come equipped with double wishbone suspension at the front and rear axles. The suspension system features adaptive shock absorbers and a front axle lifting mechanism.

=== Wheels ===
The first generation of the GTA Spano came equipped with forged alloy wheels with diameters of 19 inches at the front and 20 inches at the rear. The wheels are fitted with Pirelli P Zero tyres with codes of 255/35 ZR 19 for the front and 335/30 ZR 20 for the rear.

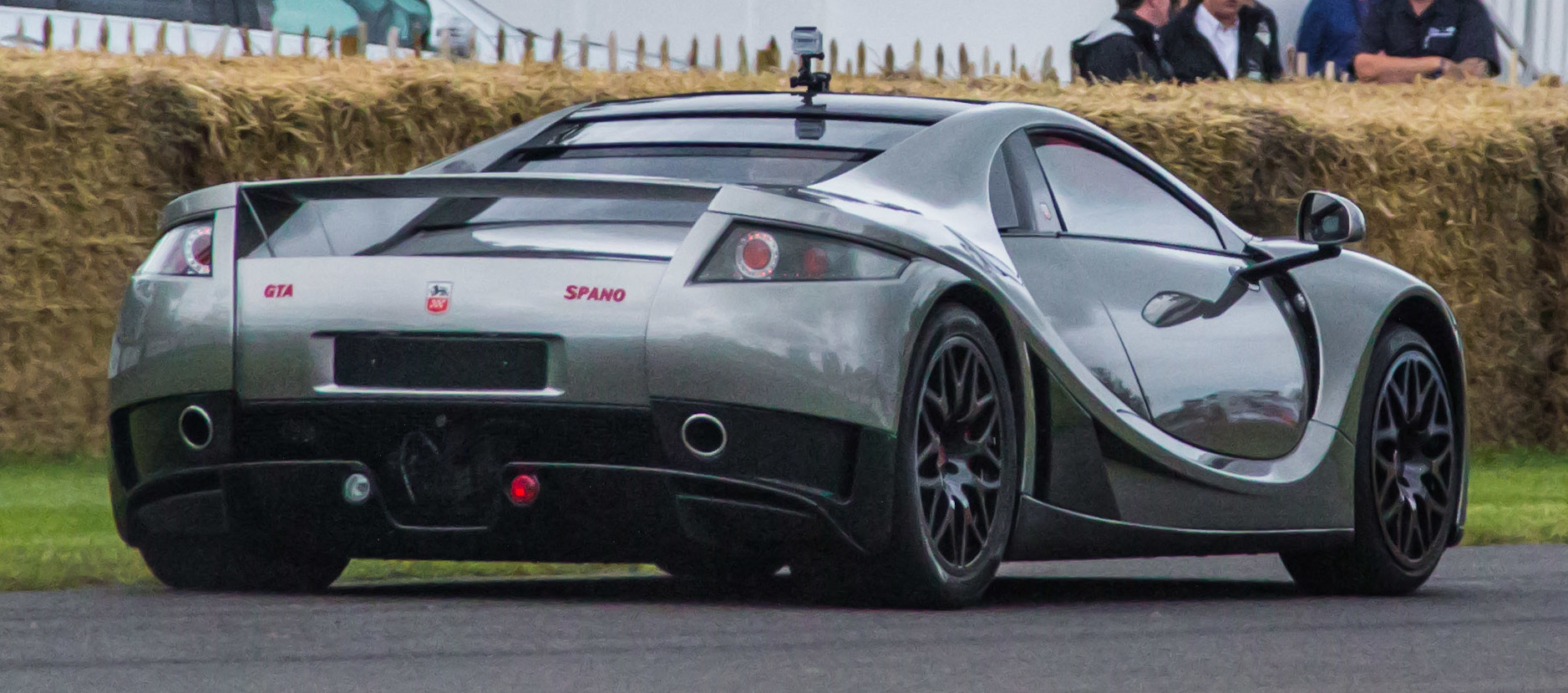
Rear view (first generation)

For the second generation model, Spania GTA switched to Michelin tyres coming from Pierre COHARD advices from Michelin OE2C and increased the sizes all around. The new car comes with Michelin Pilot Super Sport tyres with codes of 265/30 ZR 19 for the front and 345/30 ZR 20 for the rear. The brakes for all models are 380 mm (15.0 in) diameter, 6 caliper carbon ceramic ventilated discs.

=== Exterior features ===
The GTA Spano features a specially designed panoramic moonroof whose opacity can be controlled from inside the cabin. The driver can also control the car's active rear wing to adjust the level of downforce produced at speed.

=== Powertrains and performance ===
Model	Engine	Power	Torque	Curb weight	(0–97 km/h)	Top speed
Pre-production	8.3 L supercharged V10	780 PS (574 kW)	920 N⋅m (679 lb⋅ft)	1,350 kg (2,976 lb)	2.9 seconds	350 km/h (217 mph)
Generation I	8.4 L twin-turbocharged V10	900 PS (662 kW)	1,000 N⋅m (738 lb⋅ft)	1,350 kg (2,976 lb)	2.9 seconds	350 km/h (217 mph)
Generation II	8.0 L twin-turbocharged V10	925 PS (680 kW)	1,220 N⋅m (900 lb⋅ft)	1,400 kg (3,086 lb)	2.9 seconds	370 km/h (230 mph)

== In media ==
The GTA Spano was featured in the 2014 film Need for Speed.

The GTA Spano was featured in the television series Ballers season 2, episode 7.

The GTA Spano has been featured in a number of video games, including Need for Speed Rivals, Forza Horizon 3, Forza Motorsport 7, Forza Horizon 4, Forza Horizon 5, Forza Motorsport, Driveclub, Asphalt 8: Airborne, Asphalt Legends, CSR Racing, CSR Racing 2 and Gear Club Unlimited 2.
