= Toroidion =

Finnish electric car manufacturer

Toroidion was a Finnish start-up company domiciled in Pohja, Raseborg. On March 3, 2022, the company filed for bankruptcy.

== 1MW Concept ==
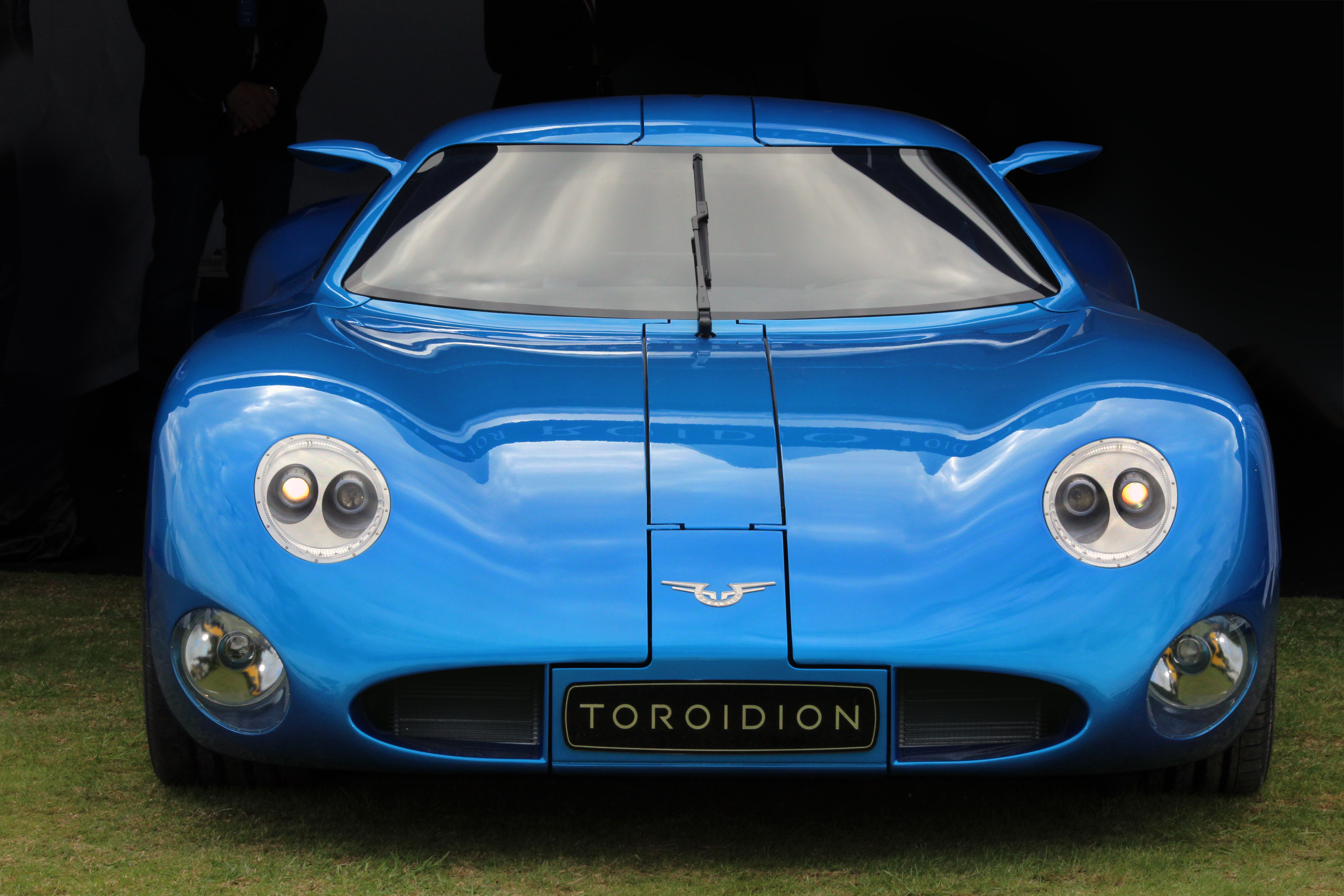
1MW Concept

In 2015, Toroidion introduced a concept car: the electric supercar 1MW Concept. Toroidion Ltd claimed to have solved core problems that have prevented making electric cars practical, but evidence of this claim has not emerged. A utility model details a central stator divided in multiple sections, each of which is fed three-phase current with a separate frequency converter. This enables a lower voltage at higher power. More elements can be added to the engine in axial direction, so that an engine can have 20 or more frequency converters. Toroidion has claimed that the lower operating voltage makes an electric car safer. Racing driver Mika Salo joined Toroidion's R&D team in 2016. Toroidion was aiming in 2016 at participation in the 24 Hours of Le Mans race within a few years.

The 1MW produces 1,341 hp (1,000 kW; 1,360 PS). Each wheel is powered by its own motor. The front wheels each have 268 hp; 272 PS (200 kW) motors and the rear wheels each have 402 hp; 408 PS (300 kW) motors. The car was claimed to be capable of accelerating from 0 to 400 km/h (250 mph) in 11 seconds. but this was never formally tested.

=== Production ===
On January 8, 2019, it was reported that production of Toroidion was starting, cars are to be made upon order and that maximum production capacity is 75. The model was named as the EUSSTA M1. The car is priced at €250,000.

== Bankruptcy ==
Toroidion filed for bankruptcy on March 3, 2022. According to the company management, they ran out of money. The company never showed a finished vehicle or sold one.
