= Hamann Motorsport =

German car tuning company

Hamann Motorsport GmbH
- Type: Public
- Industry: Automotive
- Founded: 1986
- Headquarters: Laupheim, Germany
- Key people: Richard Hamann
- Products: Cars
- Website: Hamann-Motorsport.de

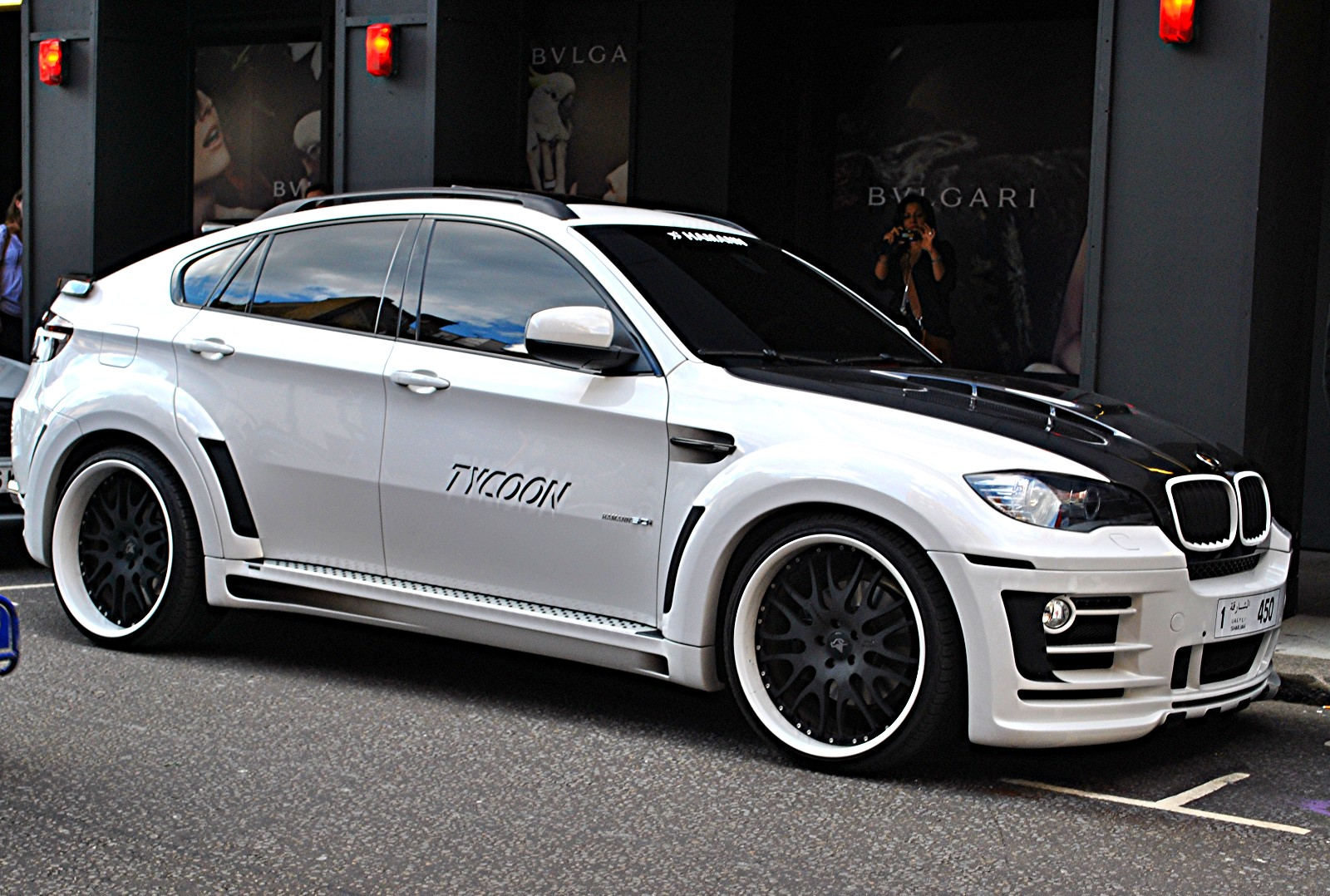
BMW X6 tuned by Hamann Motorsport, pictured in London

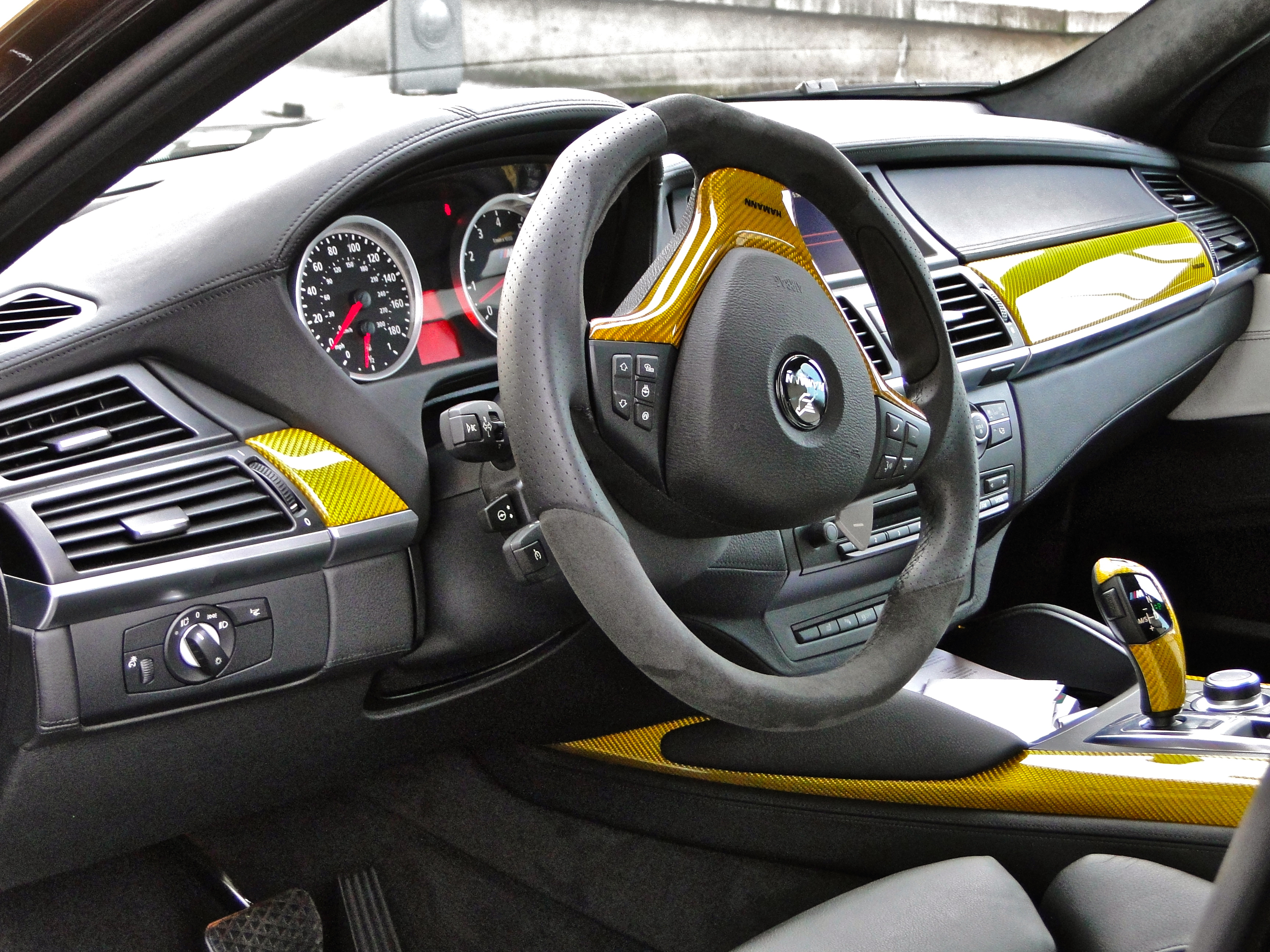
The interior of a BMW X6 M customized by Hamann, pictured in France

Hamann Motorsport GmbH is a German car tuning company based in Laupheim. It specialises in Audi, Aston Martin, Bentley, BMW, Mini, Ferrari, Fiat, Jaguar, Land Rover, Maserati, Mercedes, Rolls-Royce, Porsche and Lamborghini cars. Hamann Motorsport was founded by Richard Hamann in 1986.

The company was founded only to work with cars made in Germany, specifically BMW, but since then, has expanded its business into other car manufacturers such as Lamborghini, Porsche, Aston Martin and Ferrari. It also creates its own, one-of-a-kind cars.

Hamann offers cosmetic changes such as low profile spoilers, bodykits, carbon fiber splitters, and multi-piece alloy wheels. Other upgrades include racing LSDs, open racing exhaust systems, twelve-piston disc brakes, and engine remapping. The company orders crate engines from the dealership and then redesigns them. The company designs and builds upon numerous parts of the original car, such as tuning the car's engine, lowering the car, making a new body with more features, and installing racing tires.

The first car from Hamann Motorsport was the BMW M3 (E30), producing 348 PS (256 kW) from a turbocharged version of the 2.3-litre inline-four engine. The car accelerated from 0-60 mph in 5.1 seconds and reach a top speed of 170 mph (273 km/h). In 1990 he presented the Laguna Seca 3,5 Turbo, this time using the 3.4-litre, turbocharged M106 inline-six from the BMW 745i, tuned to 410 PS (302 kW) and reaching a top speed of 303.79 km/h (188.8 mph) in testing on the Autobahn.

Hamann Motorsport designed a variety of cars, for instance, the Lamborghini Murciélago LP640. Hamann Motorsport built the engine from scratch to enhance the horsepower to reach 690HP by modifying the engine management system and installing a custom made exhaust system. For the exterior Hamann Motorsport did not change much, they only installed the matte black wheels.

== Gallery ==
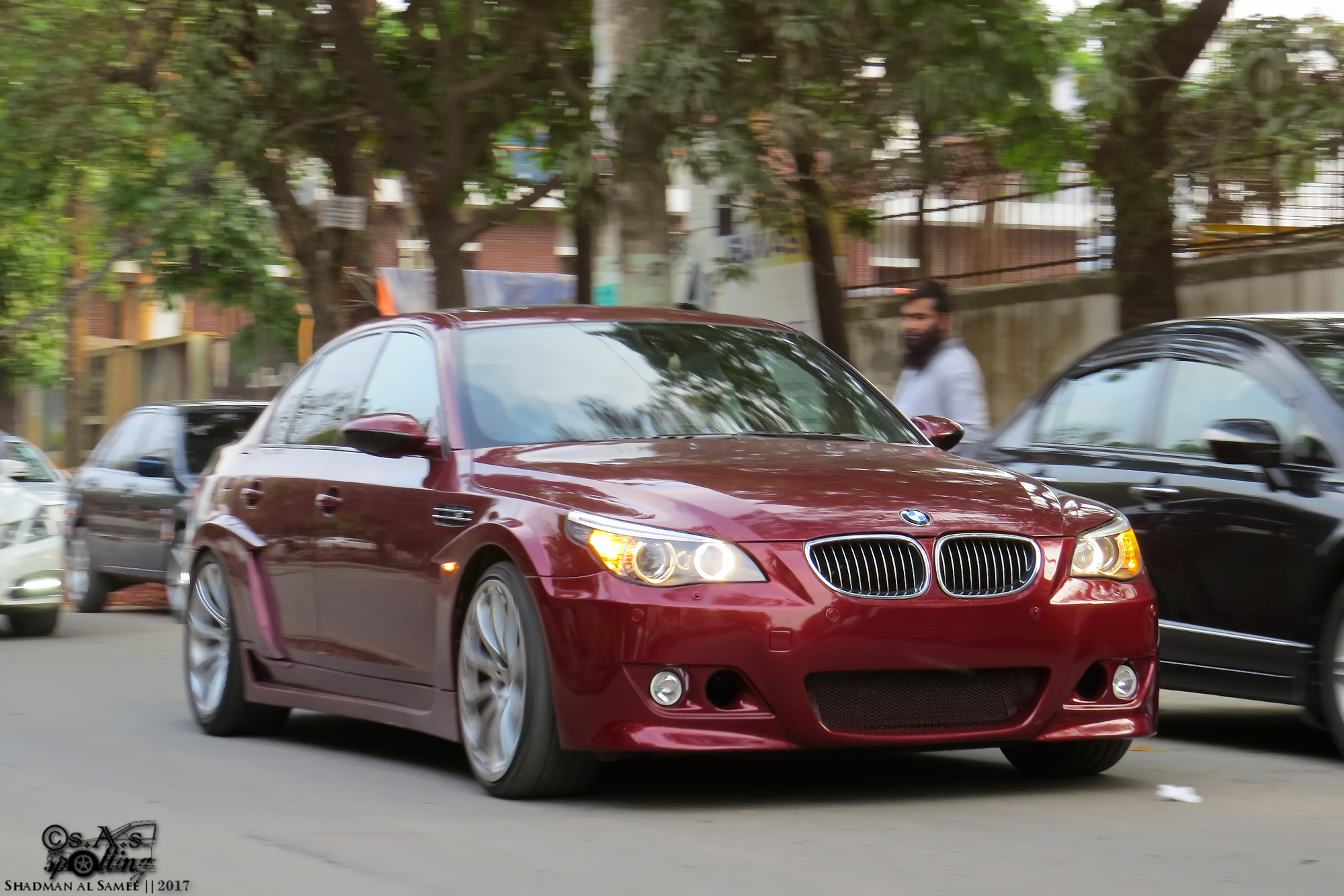
Hamann kitted BMW M5 E60 in Bangladesh

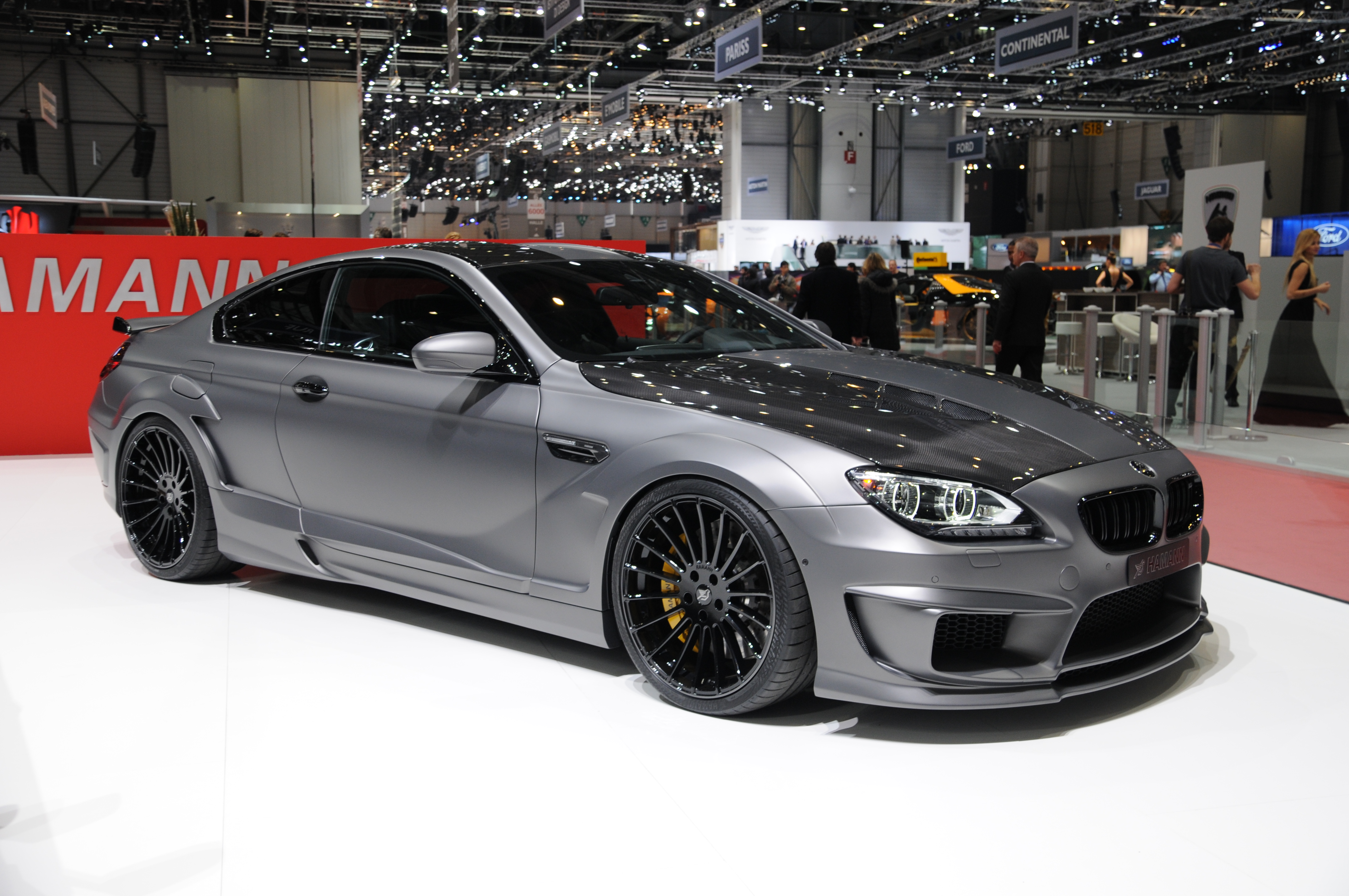
BMW M6 by Hamann at the 2014 Geneva Motor Show

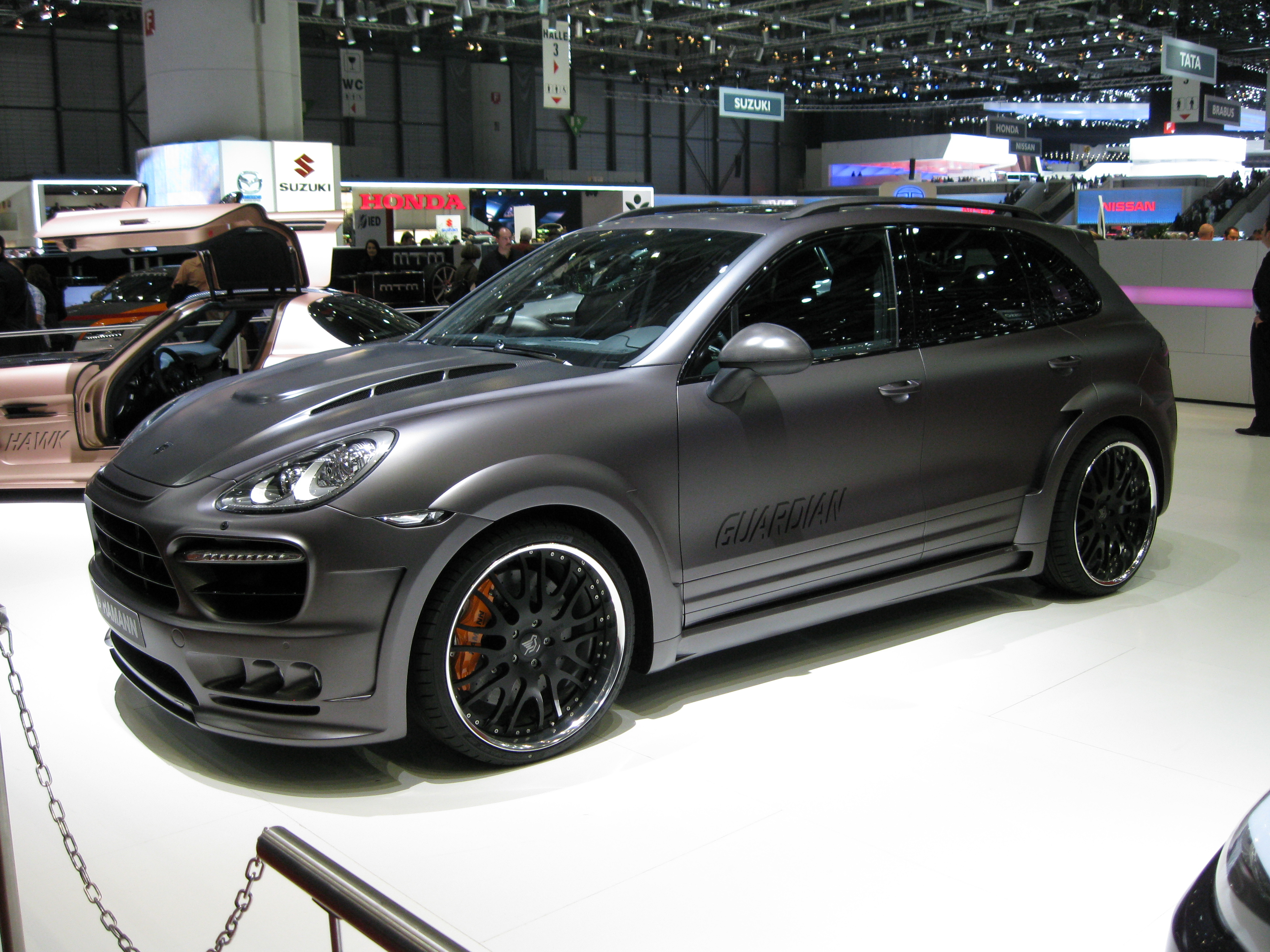
Porsche Cayenne by Hamann

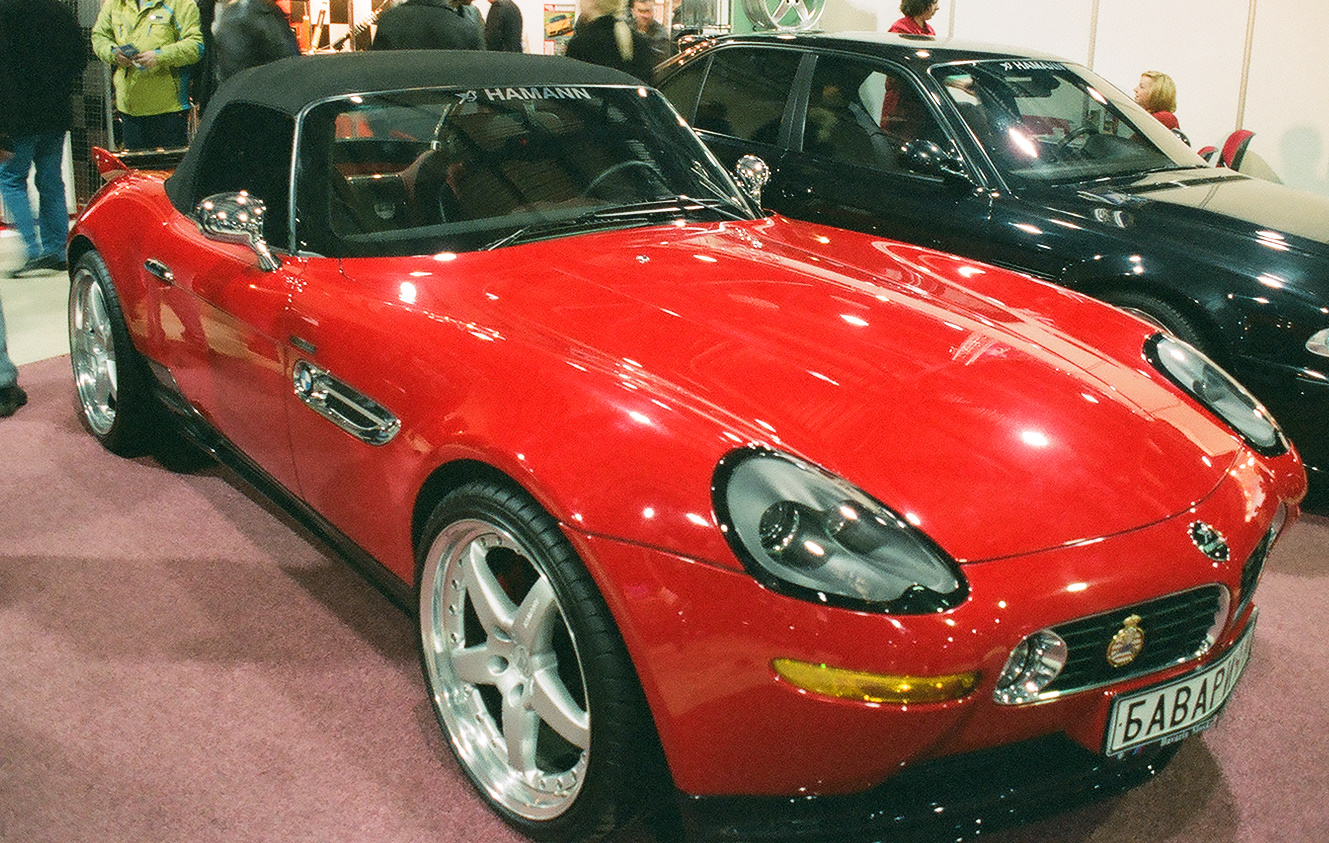
BMW Z8 by Hamann at the 2003 Moscow International Motor Show

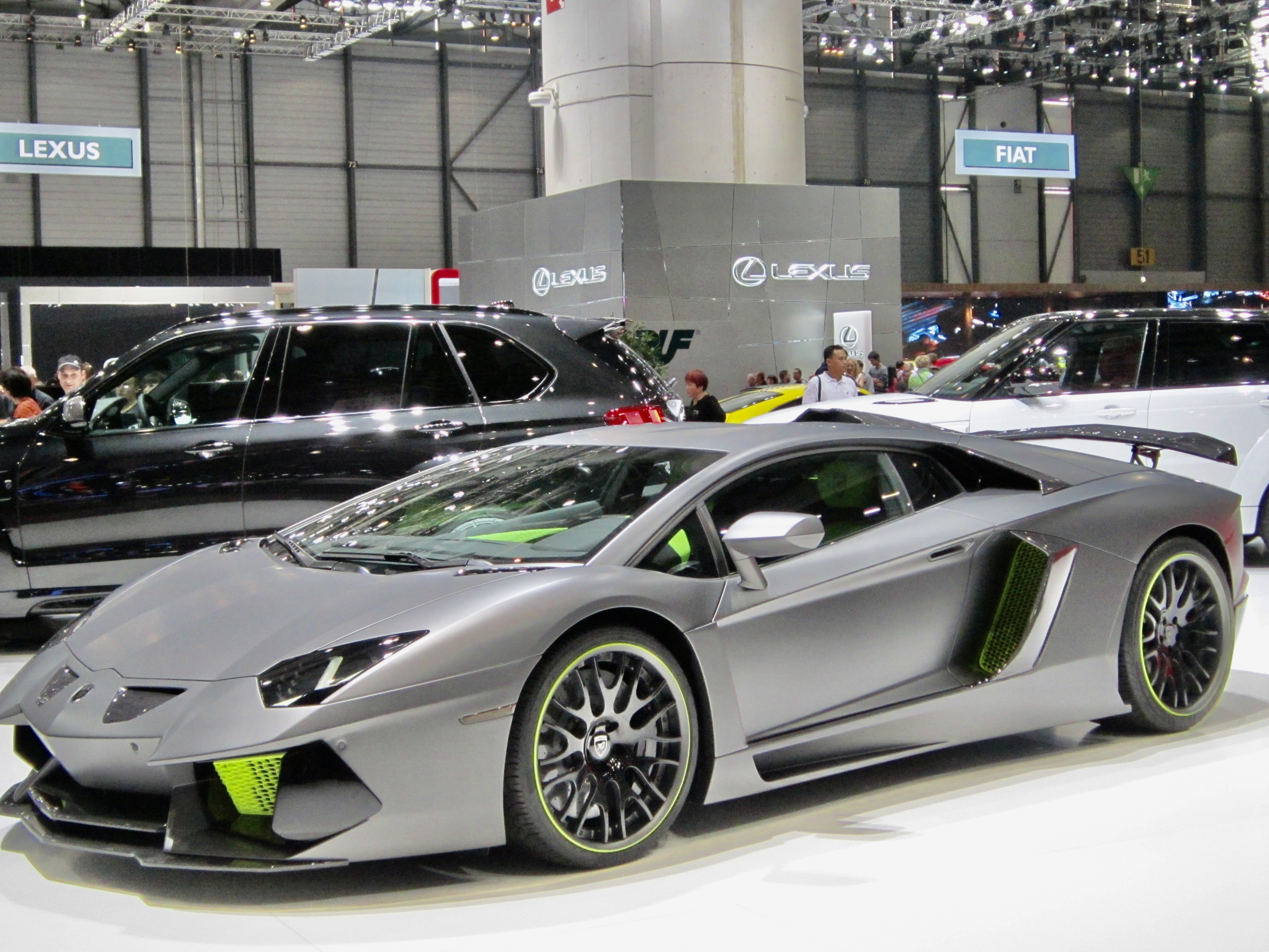
Hamann Kitted Lamborghini Aventador at 2014 Geneva International Motor Show

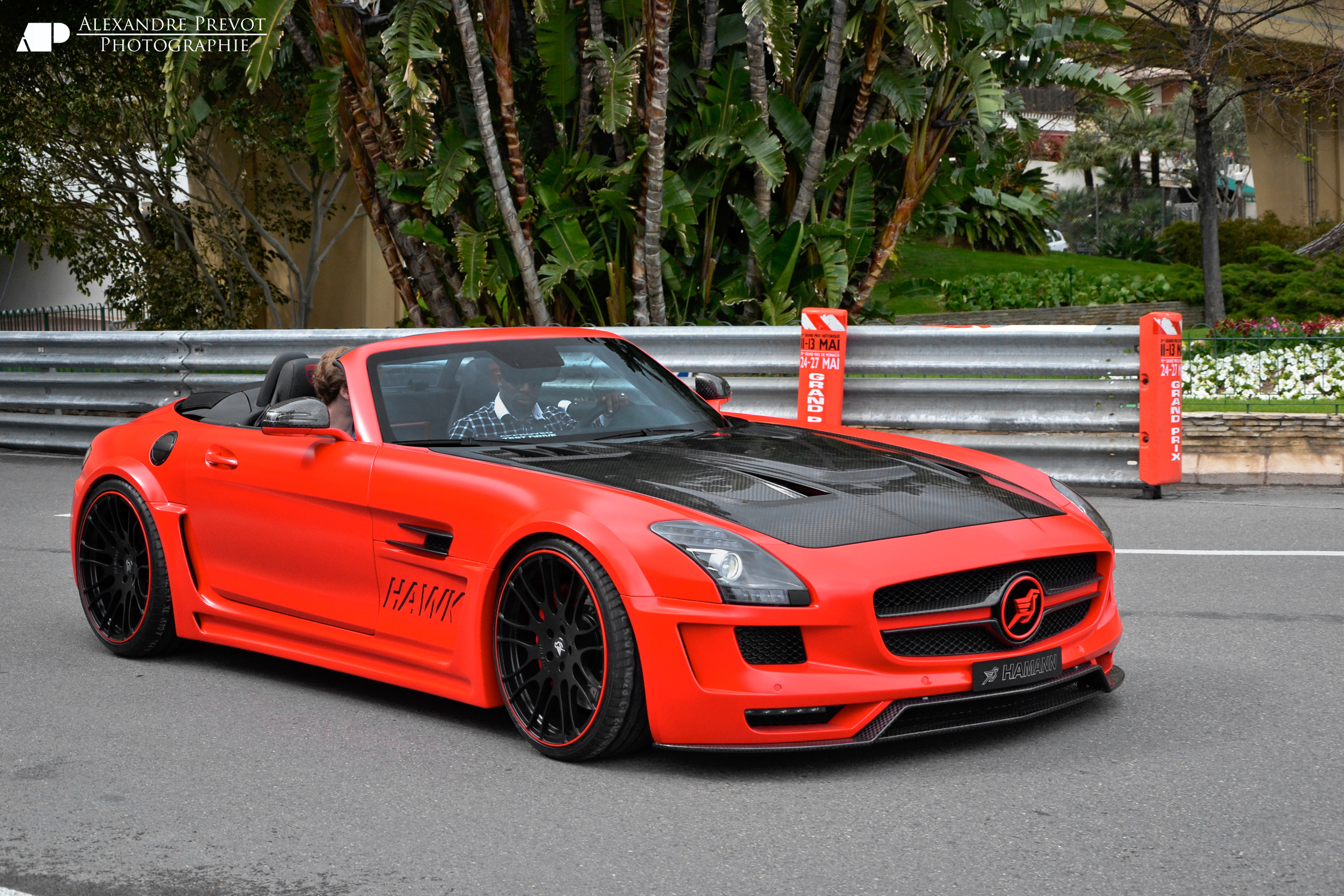
Mercedes-Benz SLS Roadster by Hamann

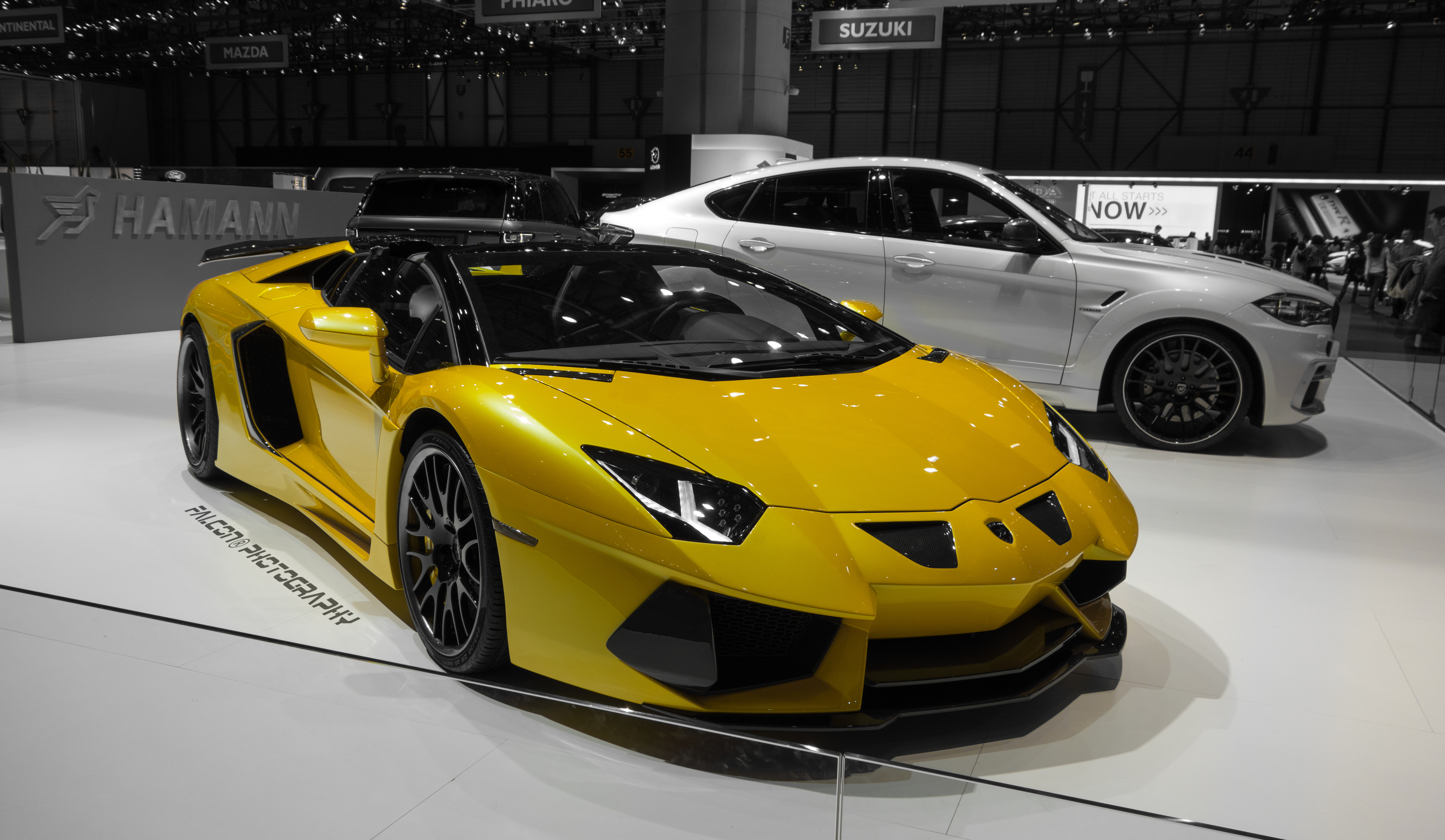
Hamann kitted Lamborghini Aventador Roadster

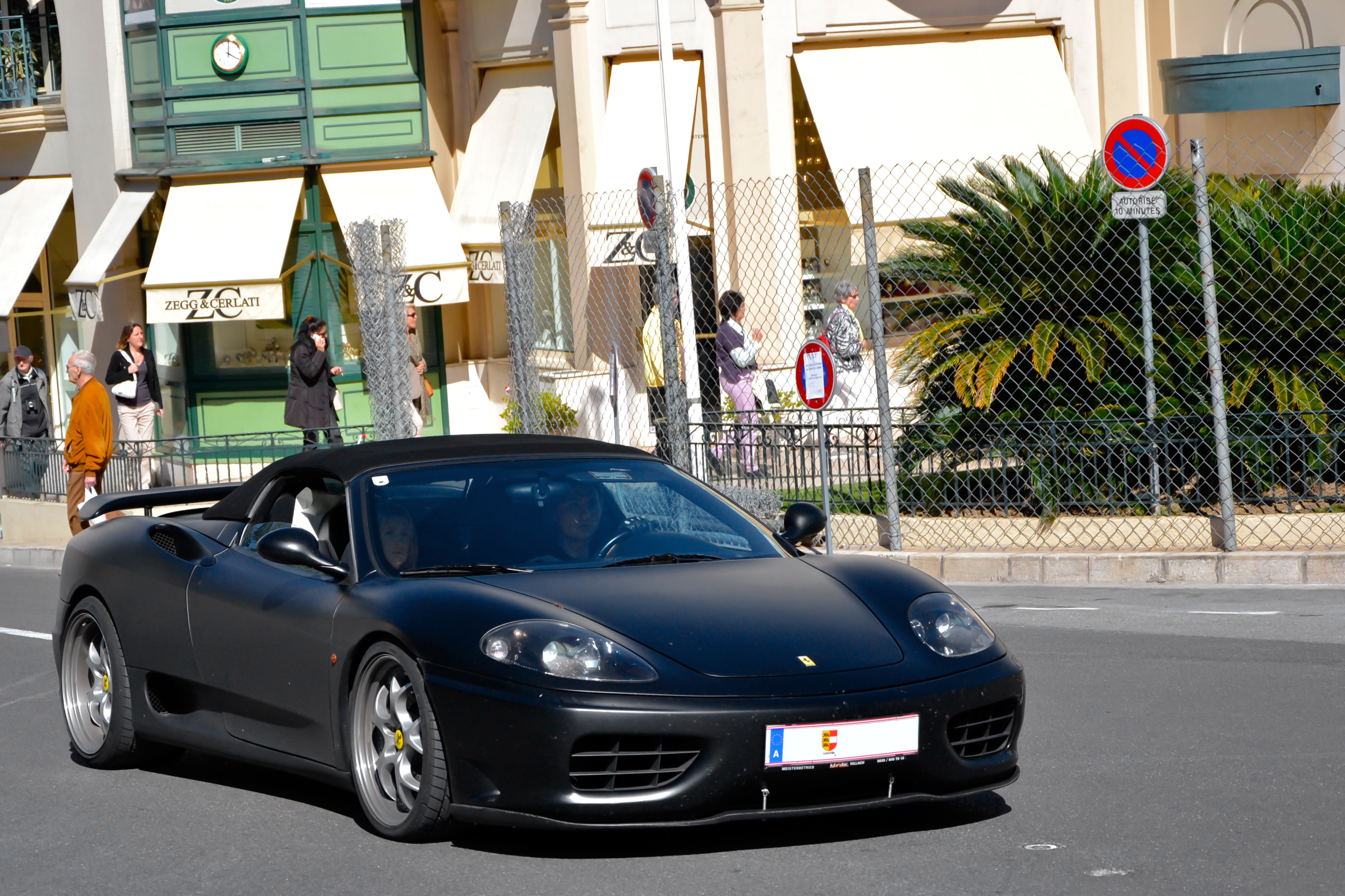
Hamann kitted Ferrari 360 Modena

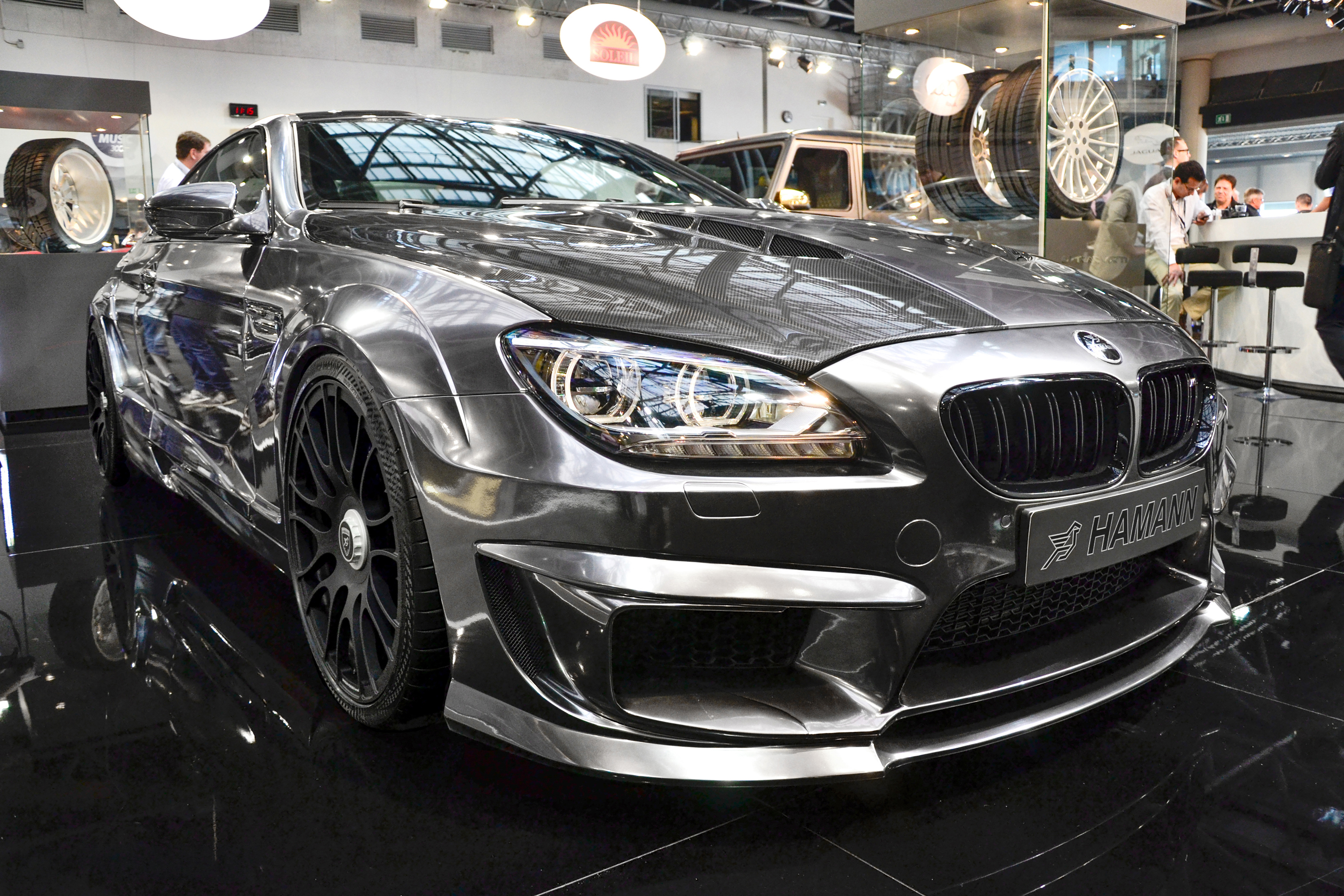
Hamann kitted BMW M6

== See also ==
- Alpina, a BMW tuning company which was granted manufacturer's status.
- Hartge, another German tuning company with a predominant focus on BMW automobiles.
