= Mazzanti Automobili =

Italian company that produces handcrafted high performance cars

Coordinates: 43.6451396°N 10.5904236°E

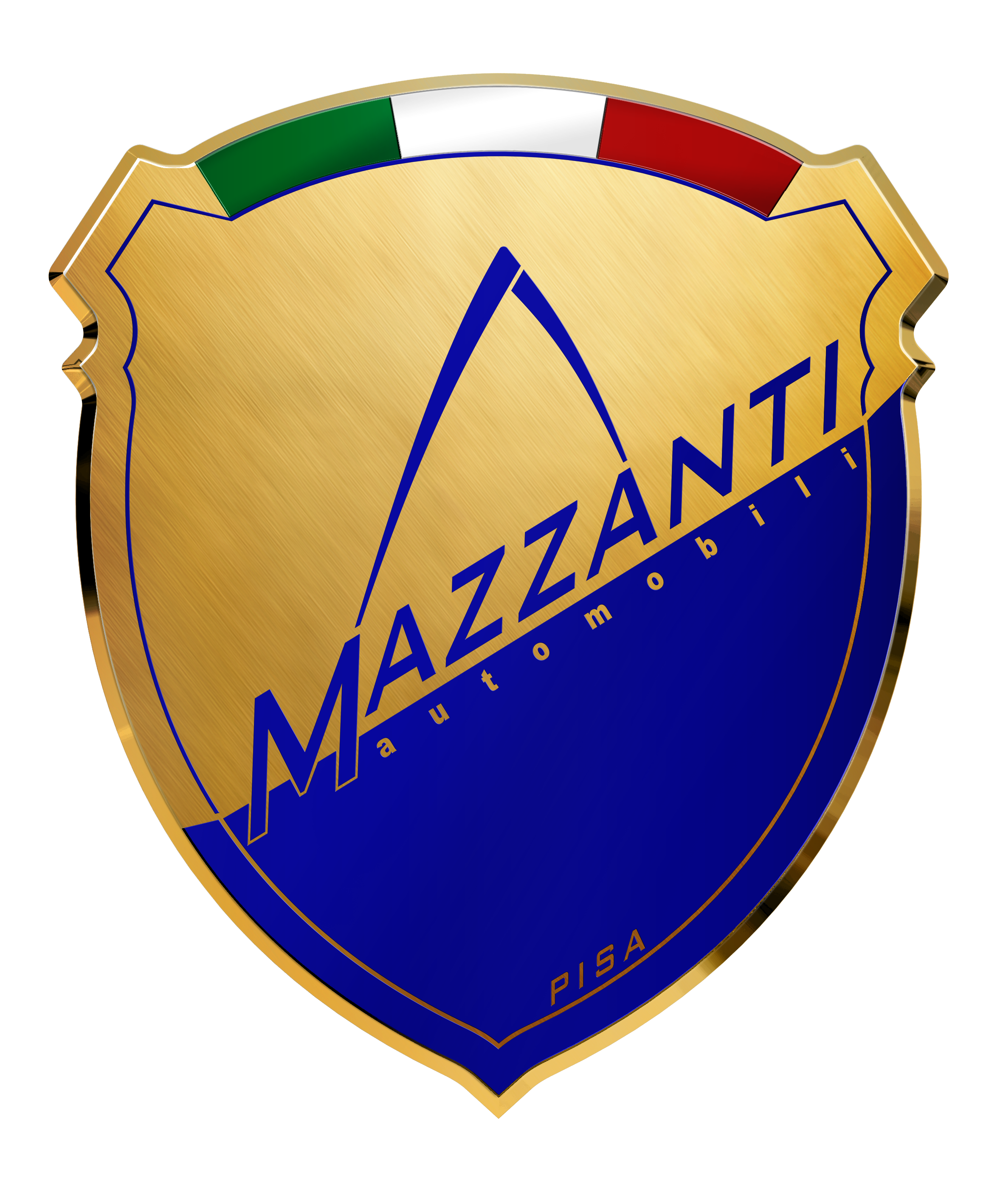
- Industry: Manufacturing
- Founded: 2002
- Founder: Luca Mazzanti; Walter Faralli
- Defunct: 2023
- Headquarters: Italy, Pisa
- Area served: Europe; * China * Russia * United Arab Emirates
- Products: Automobiles
- Website: https://mazzantiautomobili.it/

Mazzanti Automobili is an Italian company that produces handcrafted high-performance cars. It was founded in 2002 by Luca Mazzanti and Walter Faralli as Faralli & Mazzanti. It was renamed Mazzanti Automobili after the split of Mazzanti and Farelli in 2010. The company was liquidated in 2023, subsequently purchased by a new owner, and renamed to Evantra Automobili Srl.

== History ==
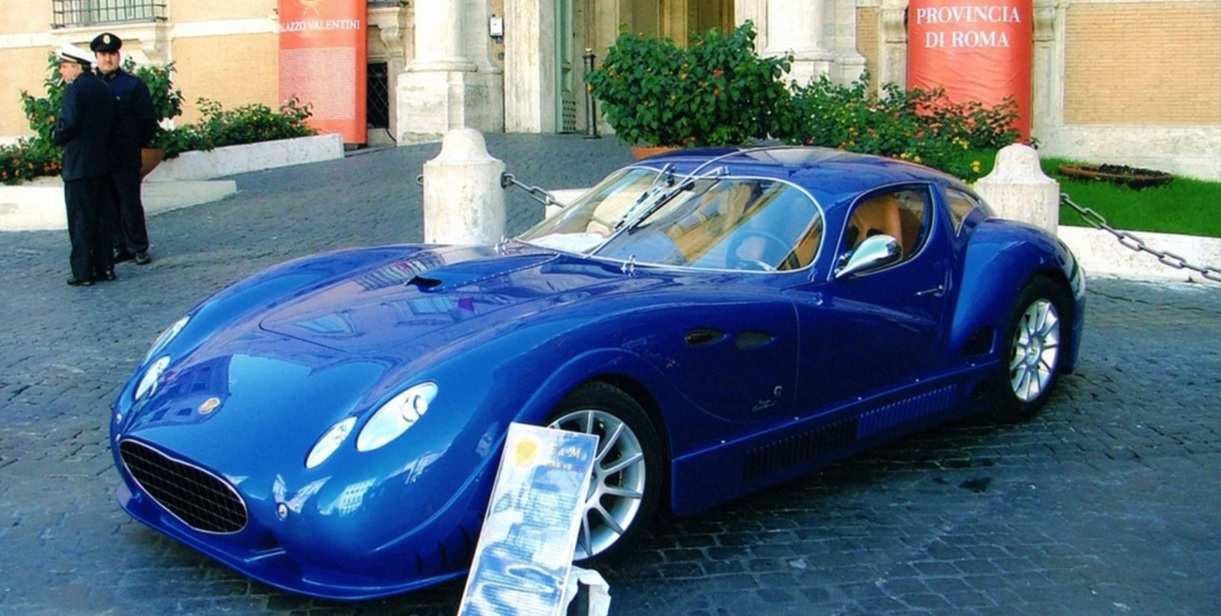
Faralli & Mazzanti Antas

Mazzanti Automobili was established in 2002 as Faralli & Mazzanti in Gello di Pontedera (PI) by Luca Mazzanti, specializing in the design and development of handcrafted automobiles, and Walter Faralli, specializing in the restoration of classic cars. The two partners set up a small automobile workshop, which was intended both to restore vehicles and to practice design skills.

They developed exotic sports cars with their first model called the F&M Antas, which was manufactured entirely by hand.

The enterprise was split into two units, "Mazzanti Automobili" and "Faralli Restauri," in 2010, when the two partners took independent approaches and decided to focus on their respective areas of expertise.

=== The Evantra project ===
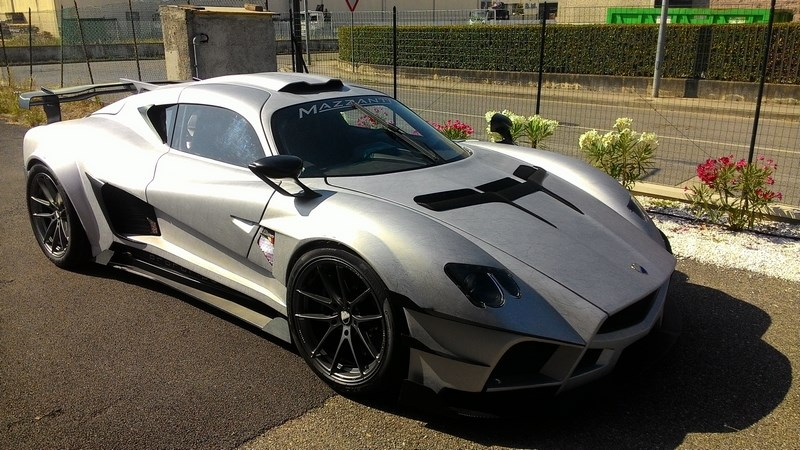
Mazzanti Evantra

In 2011, Luca Mazzanti, after three years of work and with the support of the designer Zsolt Tarnok, presented the project Evantra, a mid-engine coupé to be produced in limited units. During 2012, Mazzanti created full-sized models and began construction of the first unit.

The Evantra was archived in the collection of the Museum of Tuscan Design (Mu.De.To). The Evantra was unveiled at the 2013 "Top Marques Monaco Show."

The company has a capacity to produce five cars per year and has used the Pontedera Circuit, a temporary street racing course set up in Italy, for road testing. Final tests of Evantras were made in Autodromo di Modena.

== Markets ==
The company's main markets are Europe, Russia, China, and the United Arab Emirates.

== Bibliography ==
- Enciclopedia dell’ Automobile, Fabio Raffaelli Volume 3, pagine 409, 410, 411 e 412.
- Riccardo Paterni, Innovazione a tutto gas! Da cento anni di motorsport il carburante all'innovazione in azienda. Life Plan, Piacenza - 2013 (web)
- Hubert Hainault, Montres automobiles, symboles de l'eccellence - Editions ETAI - 2013
- Chlorosphère, Show Me - Cahier de Tendances 2016 Angers - 2014
- Tomas Klocke, Mazzanti Evantra. Supersportwagen «made in Italy» "High Life" Heft 33, Klocke Verlag - Bielefeld - 2014 (web)
