= Spania GTA =

Automobile manufacturing company

- Company type: Private
- Industry: Automobile manufacturing; Automobile design
- Founder: Domingo Ochoa
- Headquarters: Valencia, Spain
- Area served: Worldwide
- Key people: Domingo Ochoa, founder and CEO
- Products: GTA Spano
- Parent: GTA Motor Competición
- Website: www.spaniagta.com

Spania GTA is an automobile design and manufacturing company based in Valencia, Spain. It was founded by Domingo Ochoa, who is also the current CEO of the company.

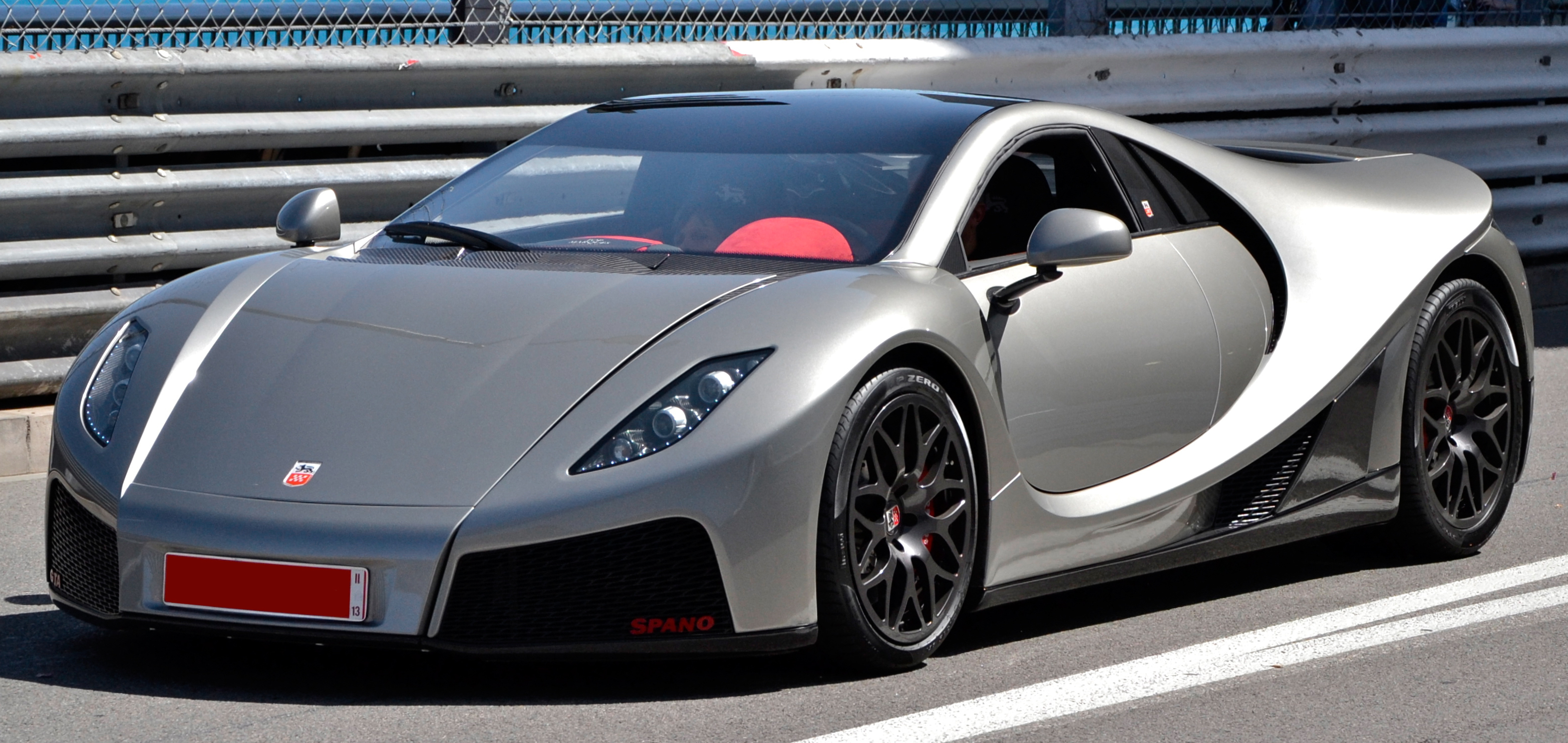
GTA Spano

They have designed, developed, and produced the GTA Spano in-house. The first production units were delivered to the customers in 2012, with full scale production expected in 2013.
