= Motoren Technik Mayer =

Automobile company

MTM – Motoren Technik Mayer GmbH
- Industry: Automotive
- Founded: 1990
- Founder: Roland Mayer
- Headquarters: Wettstetten, Germany
- Products: Car tuning
- Number of employees: 24
- Website: www.mtm-online.de

MTM – Motoren Technik Mayer GmbH is a German car tuner and small manufacturer based in Wettstetten.

== Company ==
Roland Mayer was an Audi engineer involved in the development of the five-cylinder turbo engine of the quattro sport race car of Group B.

In 1990 he founded his own company, which specializes in modifying the engines ECU. Since founded the company focused on the Audi brand but today also offers products for other VW brands like Volkswagen, Seat, Skoda, Lamborghini and Bentley.

MTM has a global dealer network of nearly 90 distributors in Europe, North and South America, Asia, Africa and Australia.

The company is a member of the Association of the Automotive Industry (VDA) and the Association of Automobile Tuners (VDAT). A cooperation between MTM and the racing car supplier Nitec Engineering resulted in the Gumpert Sportwagenmanufaktur in Altenburg.

== Vehicles and Products ==
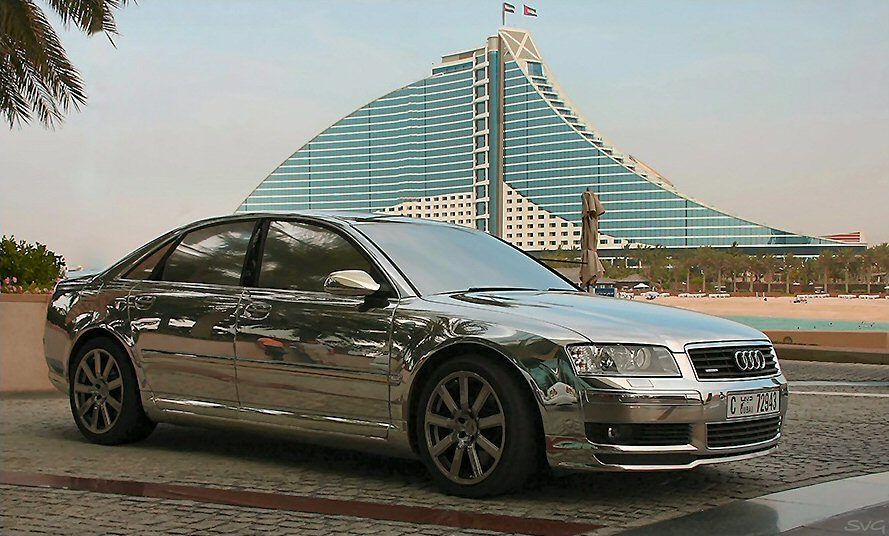
MTM Audi A8 in Hochglanzpolitur

In autumn 1992, the company built a 315 kW five-cylinder turbo engine into an Audi S2 becoming the "MTM Audi S2 RSR Clubsport"

In a test by the Sport-Auto magazine on the Hockenheim ring the MTM Audi S2 RSR Clubsport was 3 seconds faster per lap than with "normal" tires and configuration.

Visual changes to vehicles tuned by MTM are mostly subtle. A special exception to this rule are the Audi A8 models type D2 and D3, with a highly polished chrome finish.

== Speed records ==
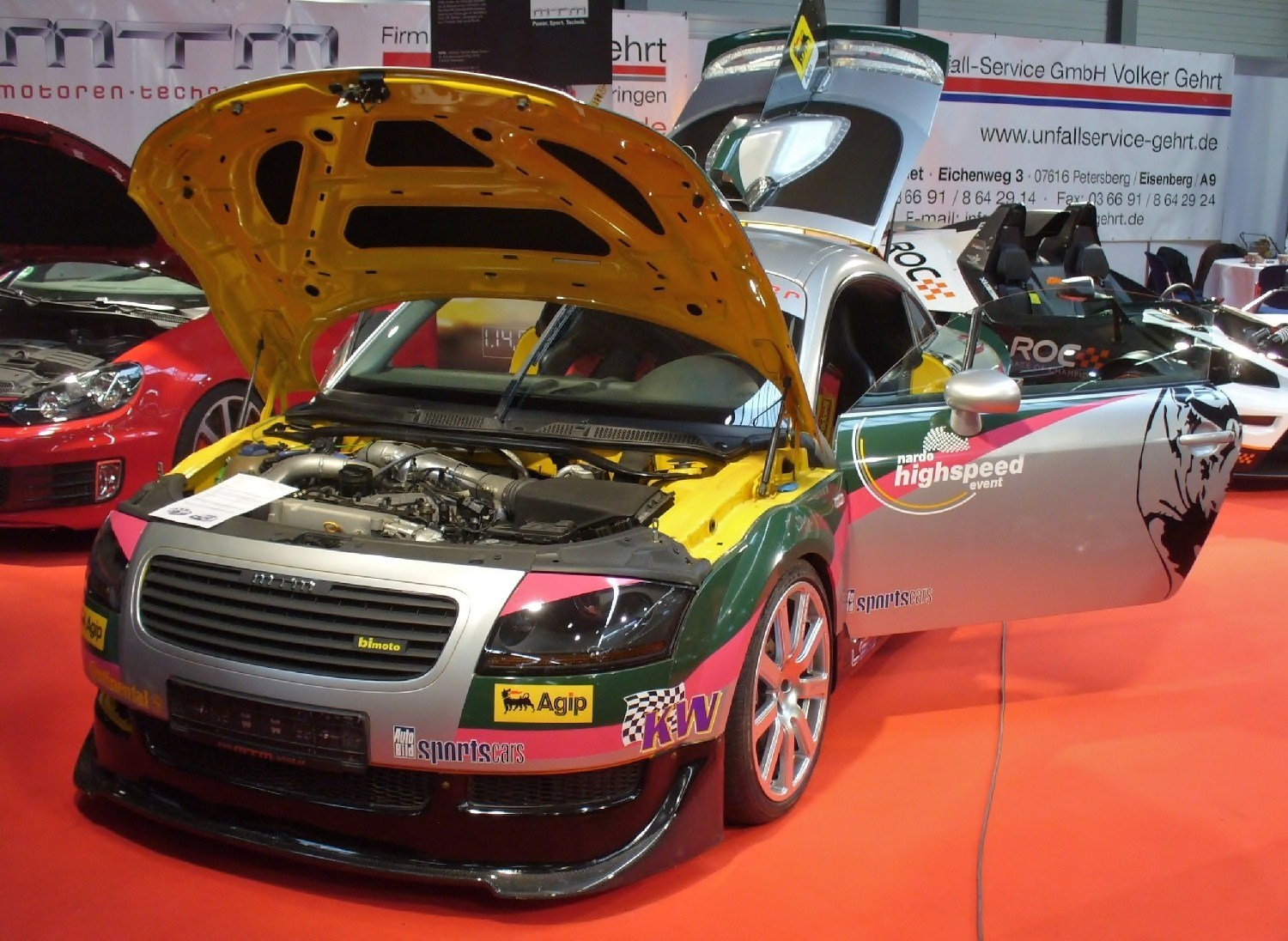
MTM Bimoto

MTM achieved notoriety for its high-speed testing. For its projects the company uses the "Bimoto"-(Twin engine) which is an Audi TT equipped with two 1.8-liter four-cylinder turbocharged engines from Volkswagen. This configuration gives a power of 375 kW (510 hp) from each motor, with a maximum output of 750 kW. The power from the engines is transmitted via two six-speed transmissions to both axles. In 2003 during an Auto Motorund Sport test drive, the "Bimoto" was measured at a speed of 374 km/h, a new record for this publication.

In September 2009, during auto motor und sport tests, a modified MTM Audi RS6 reached a speed of 344.2 km/h. Thus the vehicle set the world record for the fastest wagon.

== Motorsport ==
MTM was also active in car racing, equipped different teams with tuned engines. An Audi A4 quattro with MTM engine won the 1999 24-hour race at Zolder. The MTM Audi 200 quattro turbo reached notoriety at the "Fan Project Nürburgring", a 24-hour race at the Nürburgring.

At the 2006 24-hour race at the Nürburgring, Heinz-Harald Frentzen, Dirk Müller, Marcel Engels and Dominik Schwager started with an Apollo. The engine used was a newly developed hybrid engine. In addition to a 5.8-litre V8 biturbo with 382 kW (520 hp), the Apollo also had an approx. 100 kW electric motor. However, throughout the race the vehicle had to struggle with transmission problems in the conventional combustion segment and was only kept in the race by the electric motor. It reached the chequered flag by installing two spare gearboxes, but did not make it back into the classification.

The goal of the Gumpert sports car manufacturer was to participate in the 24 Hours of Le Mans.

== Outside Volkswagen Group ==
MTM was also being offered a tuned version of KTM X-Bow.
