= Apollo Automobil =

German sports car manufacturer

Apollo Automobil GmbH
- Formerly: Gumpert Sportwagenmanufaktur (2004–2016)
- Type: Private
- Industry: Automotive
- Predecessor: GMG Sportwagenmanufaktur
- Founded: 2004
- Founder: Roland Gumpert
- Headquarters: Denkendorf, Bavaria, Germany
- Area served: European, Middle Eastern and U.S. markets
- Products: Sports cars
- Owner: Apollo Future Mobility Group (AFMG)
- Number of employees: 45
- Website: www.apollo-automobil.com

Apollo Automobil, previously known as Gumpert Sportwagenmanufaktur, is a German sports car manufacturer headquartered in Denkendorf. Roland Gumpert, who founded Gumpert Sportwagenmanufaktur in 2004, once held the position of the director of Audi Sport. Under his management, Audi won a total of 25 World Rally Championship rallies and four World Rally Championship titles.

== History ==
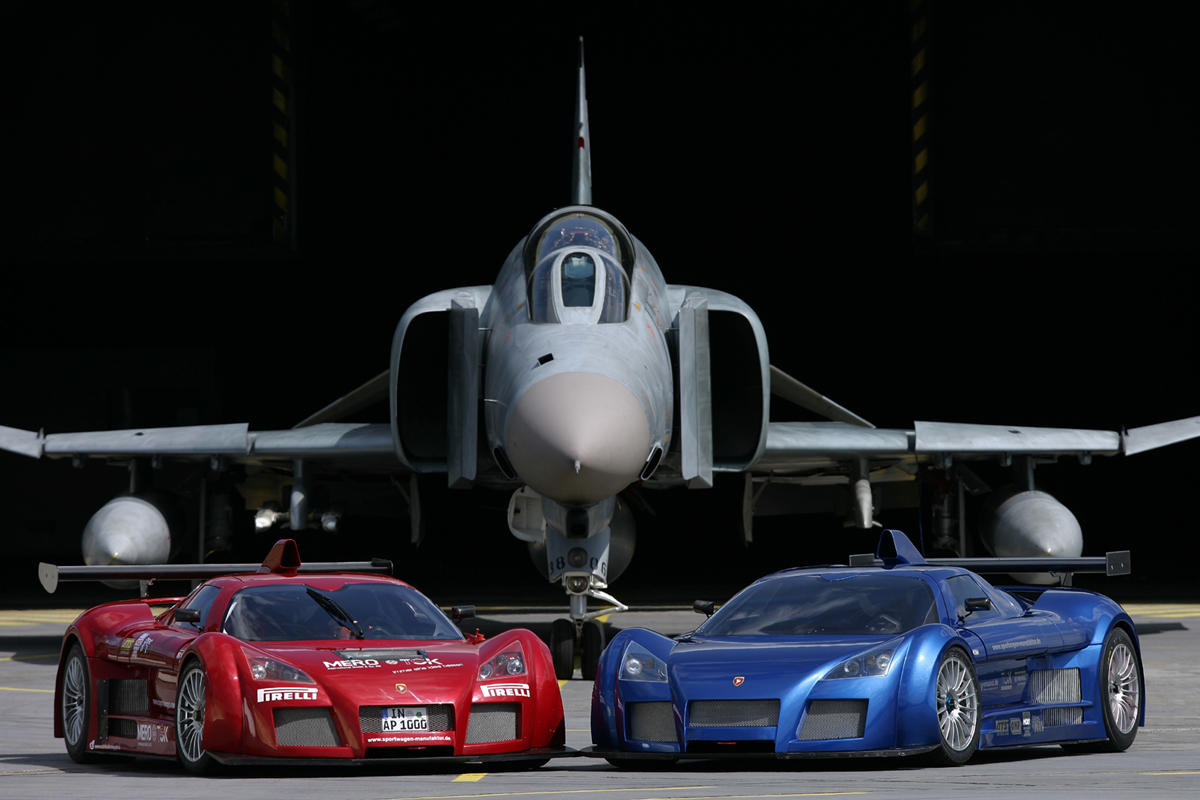
The two Gumpert Apollo Prototypes with an F-4 Phantom II fighter jet

In 2001, Roland Gumpert proposed a new generation of sports car, one that would be race-ready yet also street-legal. After Gumpert returned to Germany from China at the end of 2001, his former colleague at Audi and founder of Motoren Technik Mayer, Roland Meyer, asked him to assist in building a prototype sports car. Audi approved Gumpert's involvement in this project on the condition that the new sports car would be a series product and not a prototype.

The company was founded in 2004 under the name "GMG Sportwagenmanufaktur Altenburg GmbH". The technical guidelines were defined and the first designs of the car were drawn by Marco Vanetta. Upon Vanetta's completion of this process, the first 1:4 scale model of Gumpert's car was produced in 2002.

Gumpert continued with the development of the car now called the Apollo, along with the Technical University of Munich and the Ingolstadt University of Applied Sciences. They assisted him with the construction work, computer simulations, and wind tunnel tests. This research and development helped form the blueprint for the first full-scale model. Finally two prototype cars were constructed. The production of the Apollo started in October 2005. Many variants of the Apollo were introduced throughout its production cycle.

On 27 July 2008 an Apollo Sport was featured on the UK automotive show Top Gear. One of the presenters, Richard Hammond and professional driver the Stig drove the car. With a lap time of 1:17.1, the Apollo Sport became the new leader on the Power Lap Board, 0.2 seconds faster than the former lap leader, the Ascari A10. The Apollo was faster than the Bugatti Veyron and the Pagani Zonda around the Top Gear test track. It was later beaten with a time of 01:16.8 by the Bugatti Veyron Super Sport.

In 2011, the company introduced a concept car in collaboration with Carrozzeria Touring Superleggera, the Gumpert Tornante. The car was not put into production.

In August 2013, the company filed for bankruptcy and went into liquidation after an anonymous backer pulled out of a deal that could have saved the company.

In January 2016, the company was purchased by Hong Kong consortium Ideal Team Venture which is also owner of the De Tomaso marque. The company was renamed Apollo Automobil GmbH after the acquisition by its new owner.

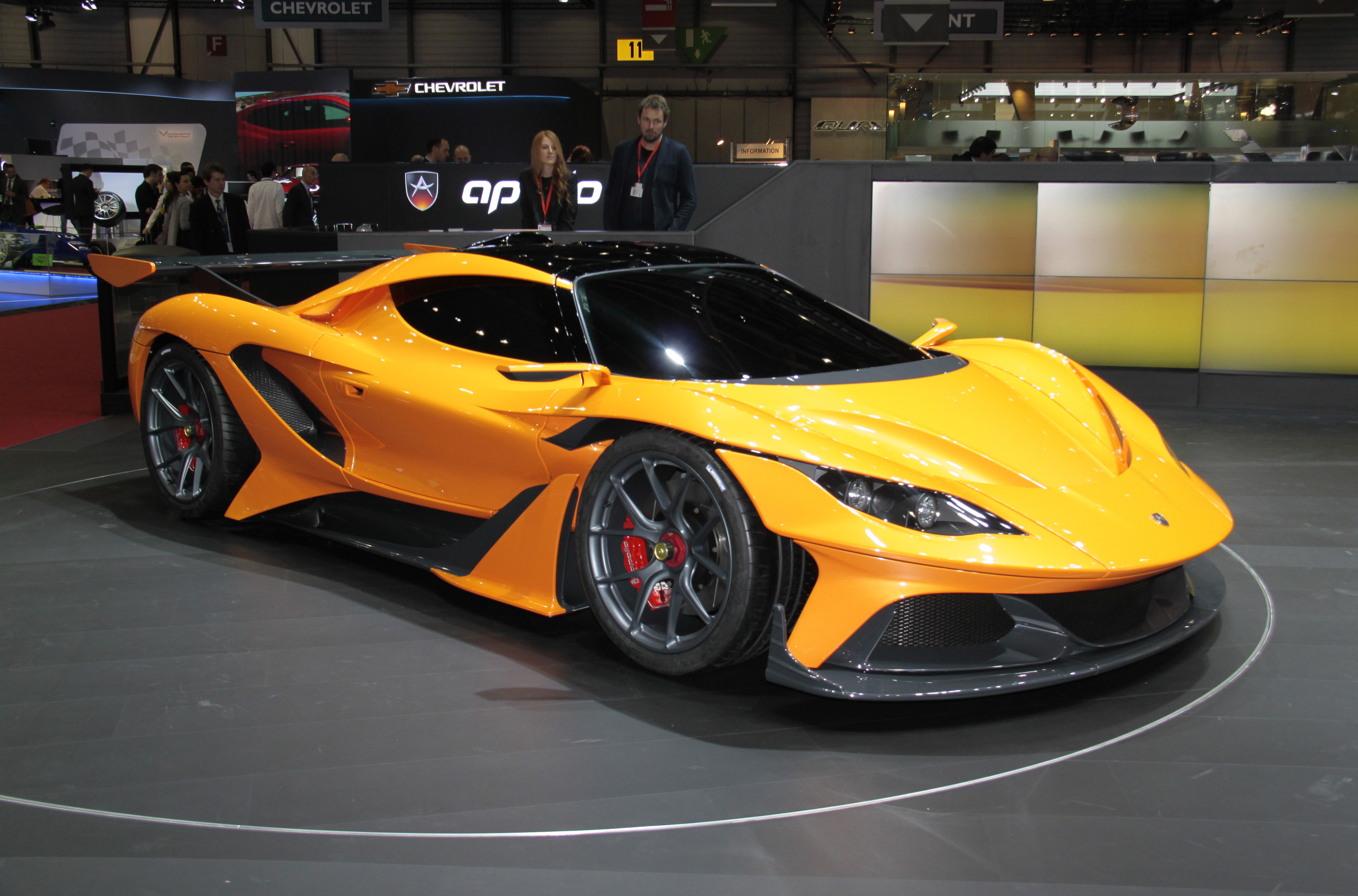
Apollo Arrow at the 2016 Geneva Motor Show

At the March 2016 Geneva Motor Show, Apollo unveiled the Arrow, a sports car that is powered by a twin-turbocharged 4.0-litre V8 engine rated at 986 hp (1,000 PS; 735 kW). The Arrow can accelerate from 0–100 km/h (62 mph) in 2.9 seconds, and has a projected top speed of 360 km/h (224 mph).

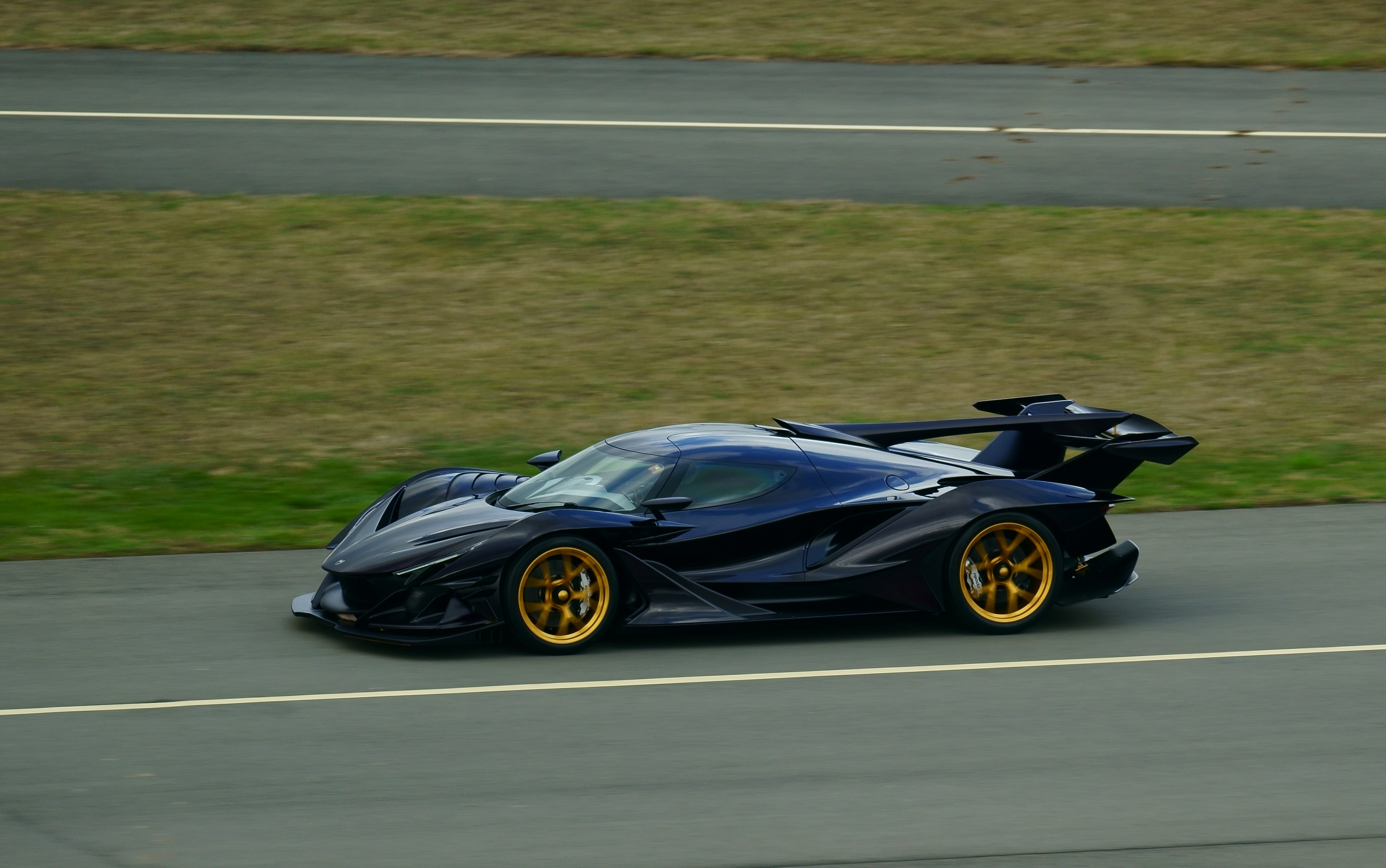
Intensa Emozione on track

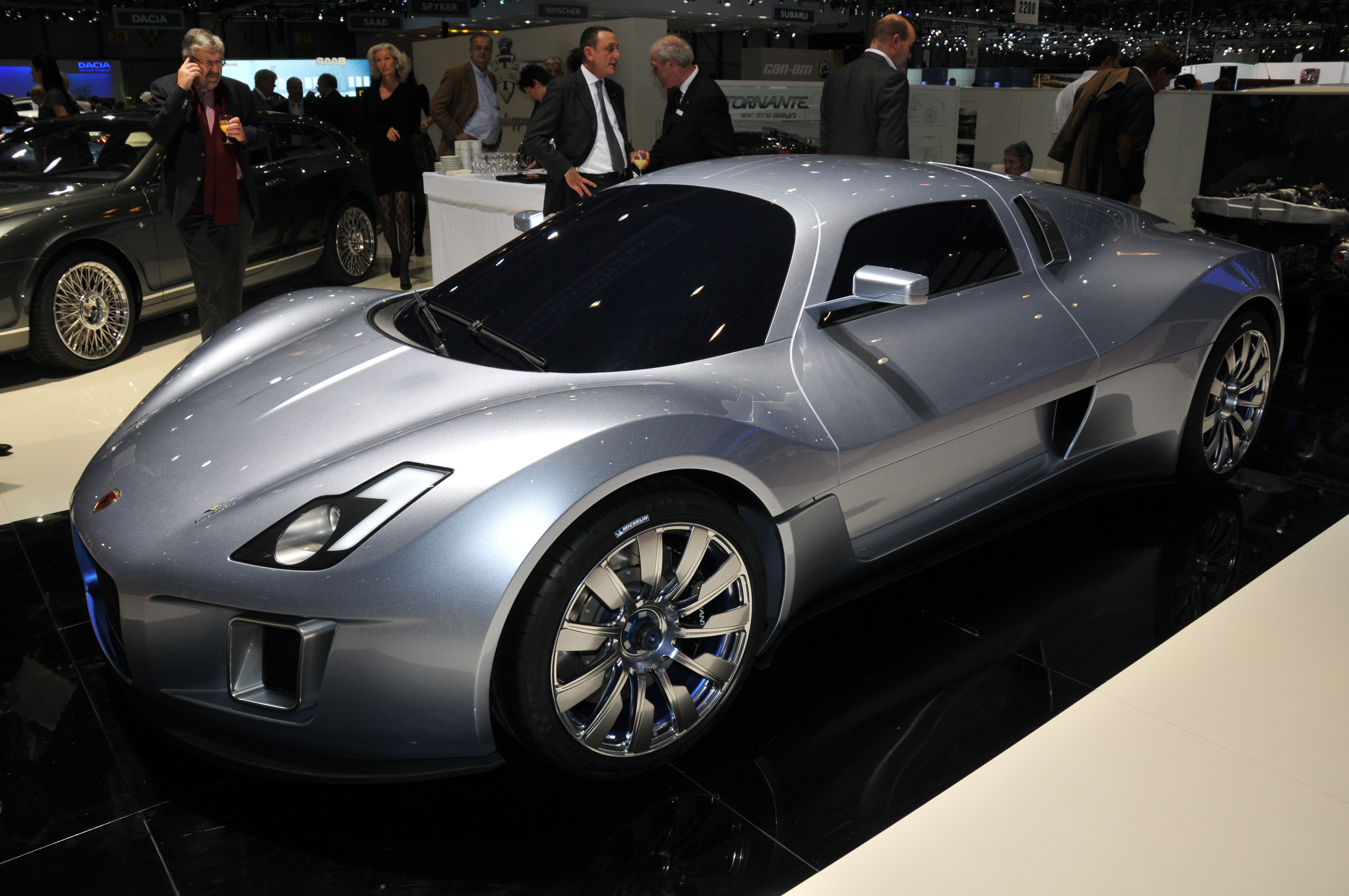
Gumpert Tornante

In November 2016, the company announced that former owner and founder Roland Gumpert was no longer associated with the company or its current or future projects and also announced a new model (project name ‘Titan’) would be unveiled at the June 2017 Goodwood Festival of Speed. The new model is named Intensa Emozione (Intense Emotion in Italian) and is powered by the 6.3 L naturally-aspirated V12 engine. The car has radical styling inspired by insects in nature. The Intensa Emozione is built in collaboration with HWA AG, the same company involved in the construction of the Mercedes-Benz CLK-GTR. Apollo Project EVO, a new addition to the range of Apollo hypercars was presented on stage at the China International Import Expo (CIIE) in November 2021.

== Products ==
- Gumpert Apollo
- Apollo Arrow
- Apollo Intensa Emozione
- Apollo Project EVO
- Gumpert Tornante (concept)
- Apollo Sport

== Development partners ==
Apollo collaborated with several business and technical partners, including the following:

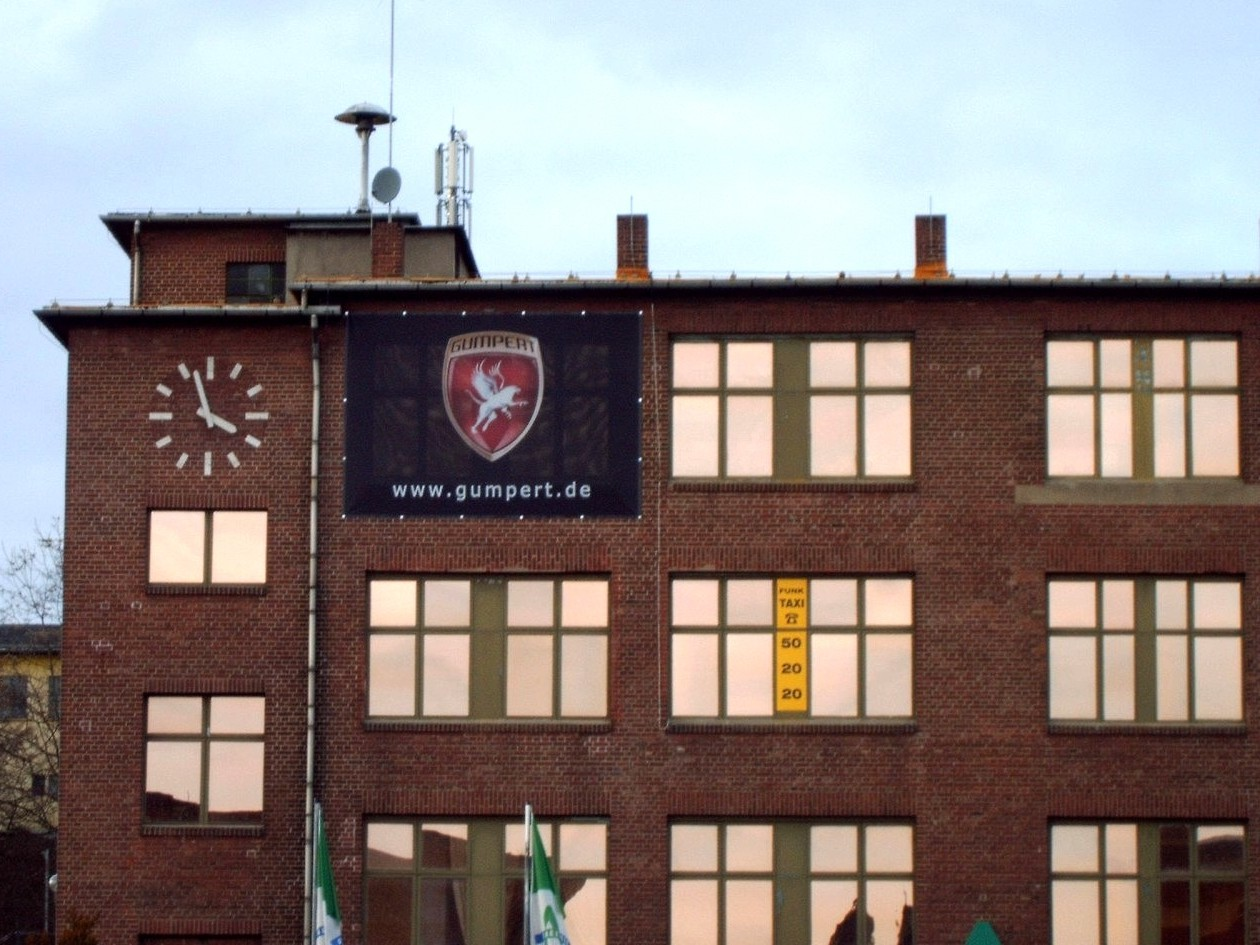
The Gumpert Sportwagenmanufaktur Factory

- Autotecnica Motori (engine development)
- Apollo Germany Limited (paints and repairs)
- ATS Group (development and production of wheels)
- BFFT (automotive electronics)
- Bosch Group (automobile components and systems, including ABS and TCS)
- BREMBO (brakes)
- Eibach (sports chassis development)
- HS Genion (automotive engineering)
- KBF Kabelbaumfertigung (the Apollo's cabling, measuring 4.2 km)
- KW Automotive (sport suspension systems)
- Mero TSK (Mengeringhausen tube system)
- Pirelli (road and racing tyres)
- TRW (active and passive vehicle safety systems)
- Technical University of Munich (virtual prototyping, vibration technology and driver-vehicle interaction)
- WIDOS (welding plastic tubing and moulded parts)
- Contrust (optimized risk management)
- Evolution MotorSports (US development partner and distribution)
- GTE Engineering (development and production of kevlar clutch facing)
- HWA AG (development and final details for the Intensa Emozione)
- HiPhi (HiPhi A)

== Motorsport ==
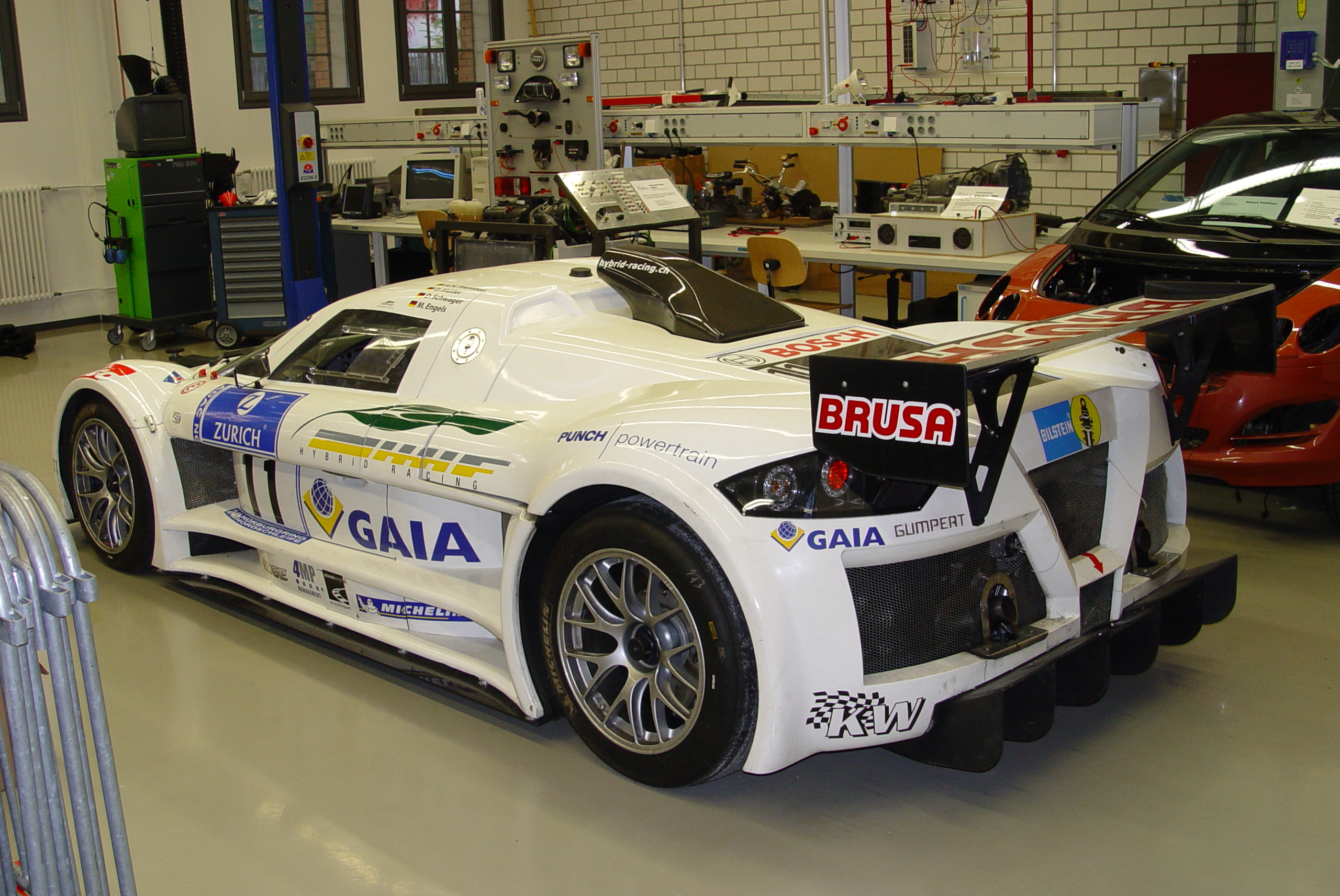
The Apollo Hybrid race car

During April 2005, the Apollo made its racing debut in the Divinol Cup. This Apollo was driven by the Belgian race driver Ruben Maes. Maes finished third on the Hockenheimring race track. Three years later Gumpert announced that they would enter a hybrid electric version of the Apollo in the 2008 24 Hours of Nürburgring, driven by 2004 winner Dirk Müller and former Formula One racer Heinz-Harald Frentzen. Three months passed between the first discussions and the finished hybrid Apollo. The Apollo was driven in the 24 Hours Nürburgring in May 2008. The hybrid Apollo can deliver up to 630 hp (470 kW; 639 PS), powered with a 3.3 litre V8 bi-turbo engine coupled with a 100 kW (136 PS; 134 hp) electric motor. The car has the ability to recharge the battery under braking.

== See also ==
- Gumpert Apollo
- Apollo Arrow
- Apollo Intensa Emozione
- Apollo Project EVO
- De Tomaso P72
