= Apollo Arrow =

Concept car developed by Apollo Automobil

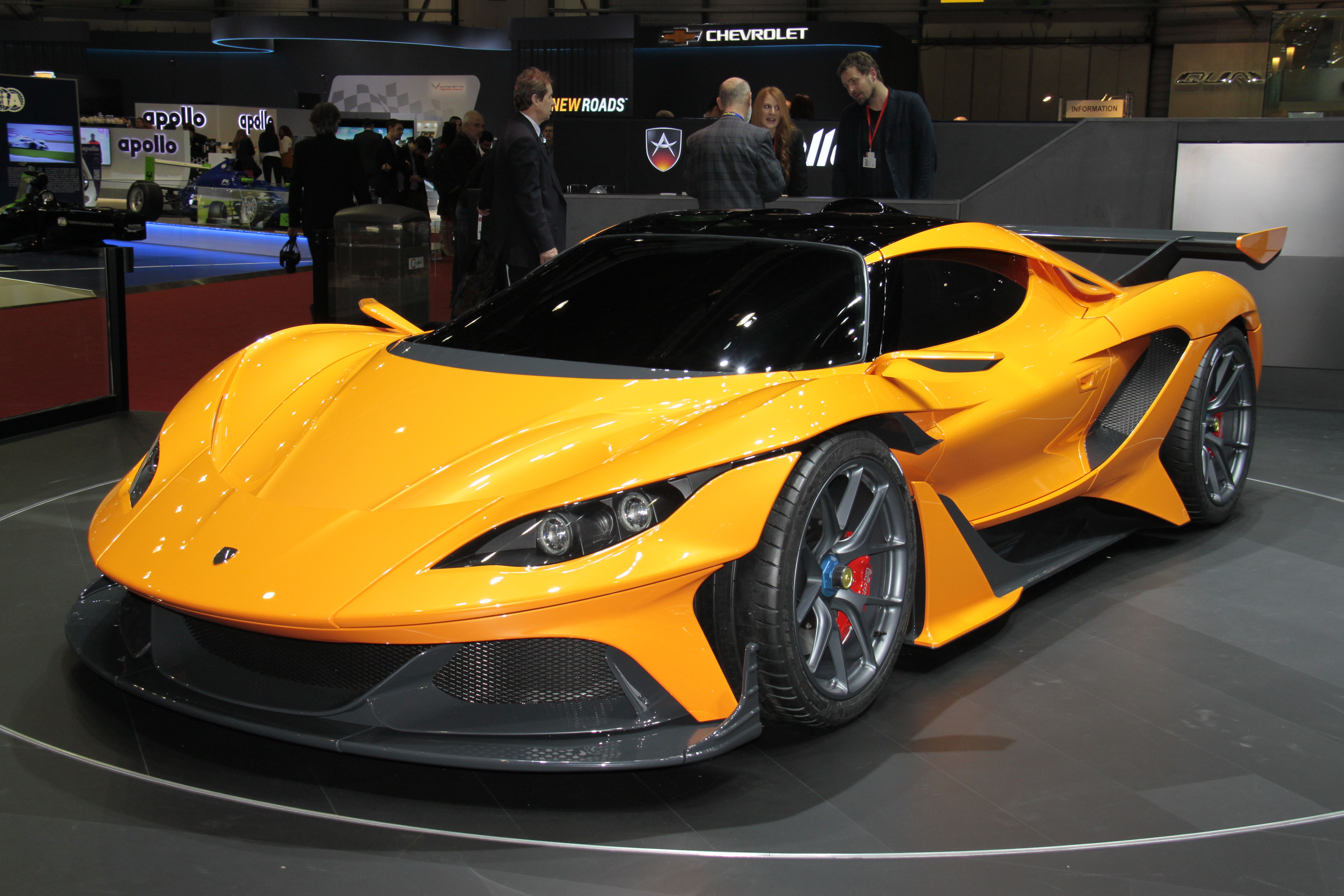
- Apollo Arrow at the 2016 Geneva Motor Show

Overview
- Manufacturer: Apollo Automobil
- Also called: Apollo S
- Production: 2016 (1 produced)
- Designer: Jowyn Wong

Body and chassis
- Class: Concept car
- Layout: Rear mid-engine, rear-wheel-drive
- Doors: 2 gull-wing doors

Powertrain
- Engine: Road legal version: 3,996 cc (243.9 cu in; 3.996 L) twin-turbocharged Audi V8; Track only version: 6,262 cc (382.1 cu in; 6.262 L) Ferrari F140 V12 Twin Turbo
- Power output: Road legal version: 999 PS (985 bhp; 735 kW) @ 6,750 rpm 999 N⋅m (737 lb⋅ft) @ 3,650 rpm Track only version: 1,000 kW (1,341.0 bhp; 1,359.6 PS) @ 9,000 rpm 1,400 N⋅m (1,032.6 lbf⋅ft) @ 5,300 rpm
- Transmission: 7-speed sequential manual

Dimensions
- Wheelbase: 2,700 mm (106.3 in)
- Length: 4,890 mm (192.5 in)
- Width: 2,185 mm (86.0 in)
- Height: 1,224 mm (48.2 in)
- Kerb weight: Road legal version: 1,315 kg (2,899.1 lb); Track only version: 1,000 kg (2,204.6 lb)

Chronology
- Predecessor: Gumpert Apollo
- Successor: Apollo Intensa Emozione

The Apollo Arrow is a mid-engine, 2-seater concept car developed by Apollo Automobil. It was introduced in 2016 at the Geneva Motor Show.

== Production ==
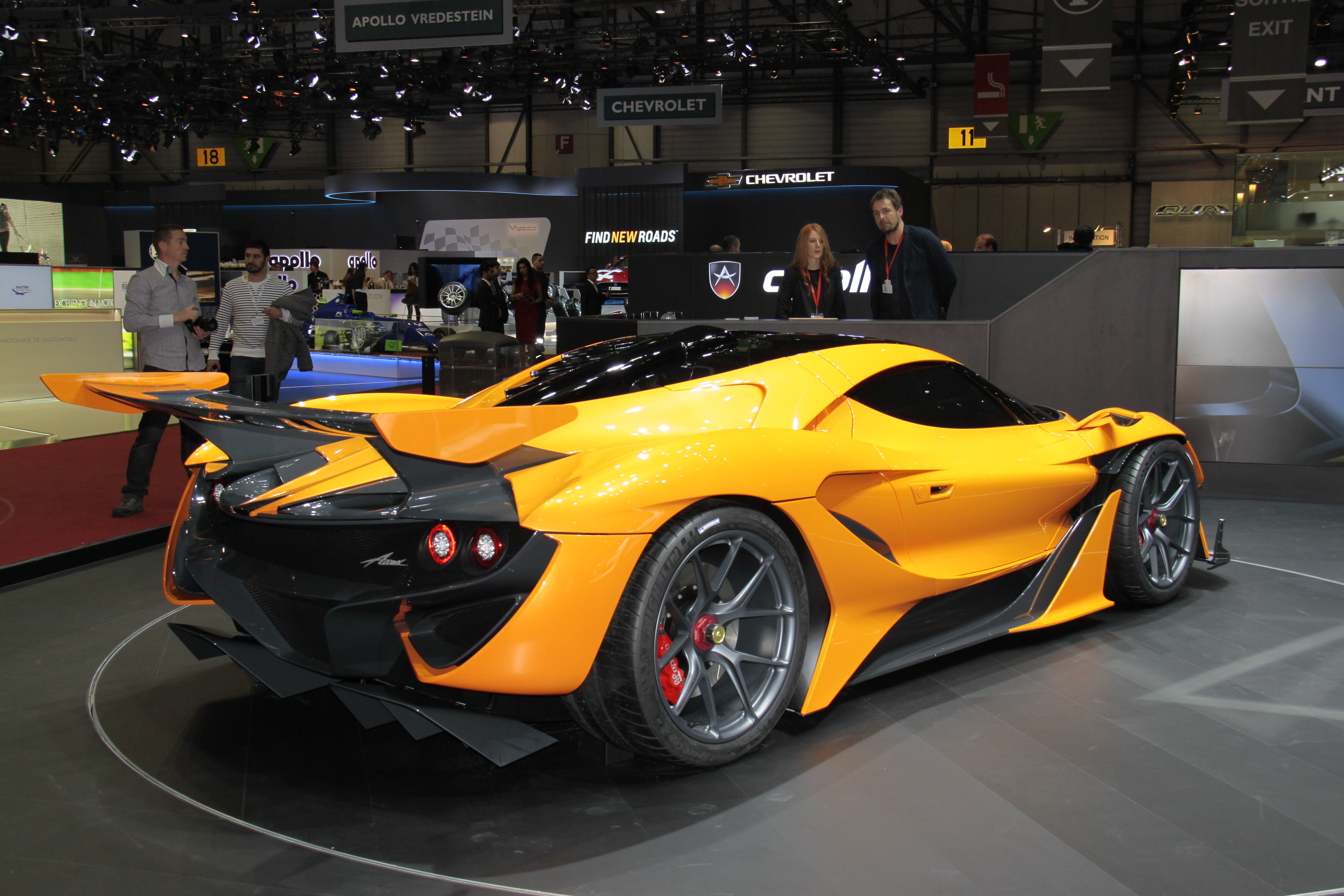
Rear view

The Arrow was co-developed by Scuderia Cameron Glickenhaus (SCG) and Apollo Automobil, while Roland Gumpert was CEO of Apollo. It was planned that an Italian company Manifattura Automobili Torino, the company that builds the SCG 003C would be appointed to produce the production version of the car. SCG stated that a production version of the Arrow would consist of a track only version with a V12 engine, code named 'Titan,' in 2017, followed by a road going version called the Apollo S with a twin-turbocharged V8 engine, and that both models will “utilise the chassis technology developed for the SCG003C”, but as of 2018 neither model has reached production stages primarily due to the management of Apollo Automobil focusing on the development of a separate model, the Intensa Emozione.

== Specifications and performance ==
The Arrow is powered by a 4.0 L, twin turbocharged Audi V8 that is rated at 735 kW (999 PS; 986 hp) and 999 N⋅m (737 lb⋅ft) of torque. Power is sent to the rear wheels through a 7-speed CIMA sequential manual transmission. It is built on a tubular chromoly space frame combined with a carbon fibre tub, the design of which is a modified version of the one used in the original Gumpert Apollo, and subsequently the 2016 Apollo N concept. Apollo claims the Arrow weighs under 1,315 kg (2,900 lb), can accelerate from 0–97 km/h (60 mph) in 2.9 seconds and can attain a top speed of 360 km/h (224 mph).
