= Apollo Project EVO =

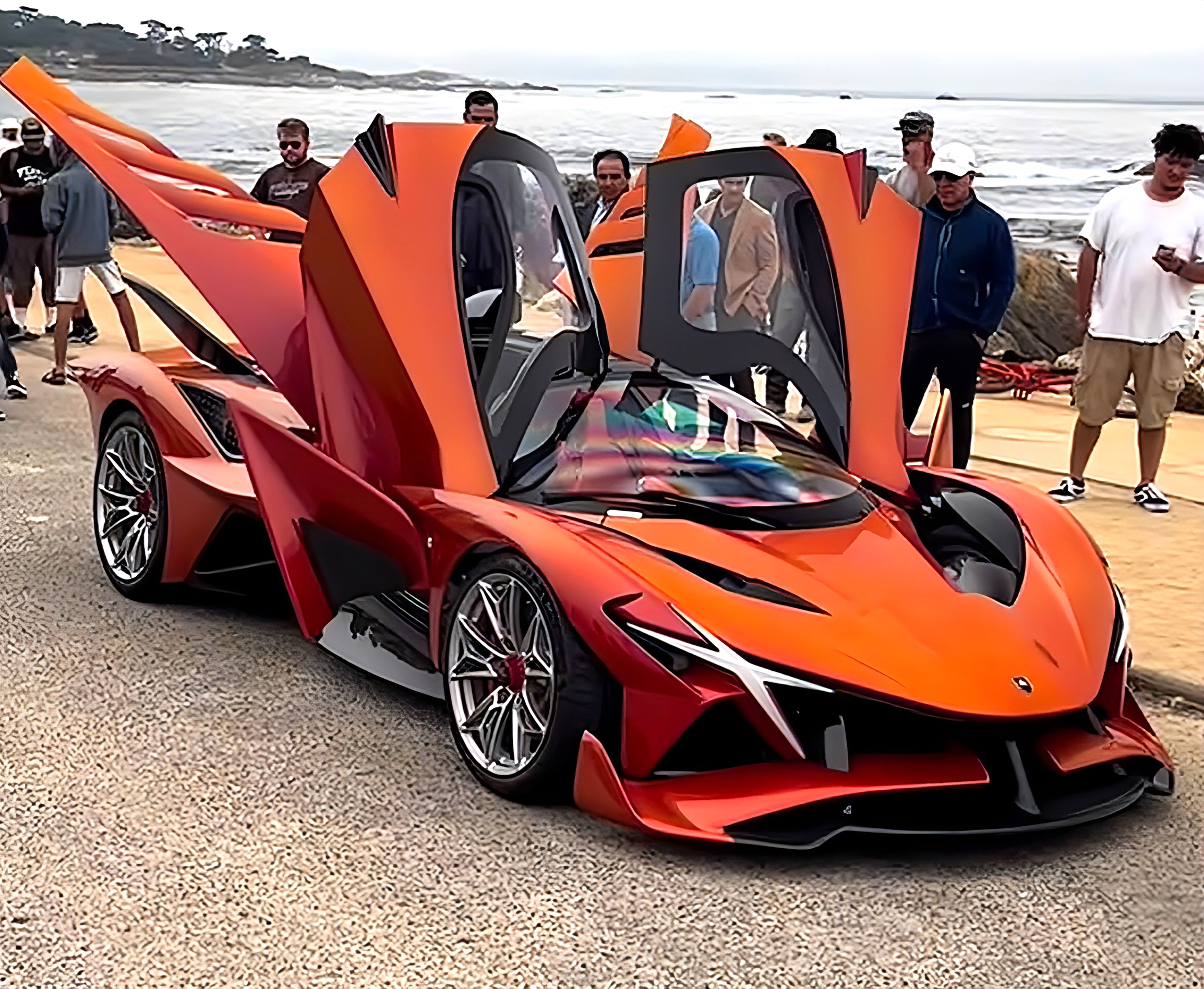

Overview
- Manufacturer: Apollo Automobil GmbH
- Also called: Apollo EVO
- Production: 2022–present 10 units planned, 1 prototype
- Model years: 2022–present
- Assembly: Germany: Affalterbach
- Designer: Jowyn Wong

Body and chassis
- Class: Sports car (S)
- Body style: 2-door coupe
- Doors: Scissor

Powertrain
- Engine: 6,262 cubic centimetres (382.1 cu in) NA F140 V12
- Power output: 780 metric horsepower (770 bhp; 570 kW) @ 9,000 rpm 760 newton-metres (560 lbf⋅ft) @ 6,750 rpm

Dimensions
- Curb weight: ~1,200 kg (2,446 lbs)

Chronology
- Predecessor: Apollo Intensa Emozione

The Apollo Project EVO, also known as the Apollo EVO, is a mid-engine sports car made by German vehicle manufacturer Apollo Automobil GmbH, designed by Jowyn Wong. It was created as a track focused version and successor to the Intensa Emozione.

It was first unveiled at the 2021 International Import Expo (CIIE) in Shanghai, China, alongside an updated Apollo Arrow concept, and production is believed to have started in 2022. There is currently only one unit in existence, which is a prototype, and 10 non-prototypes will be produced in total.

== Specifications ==
=== Design ===
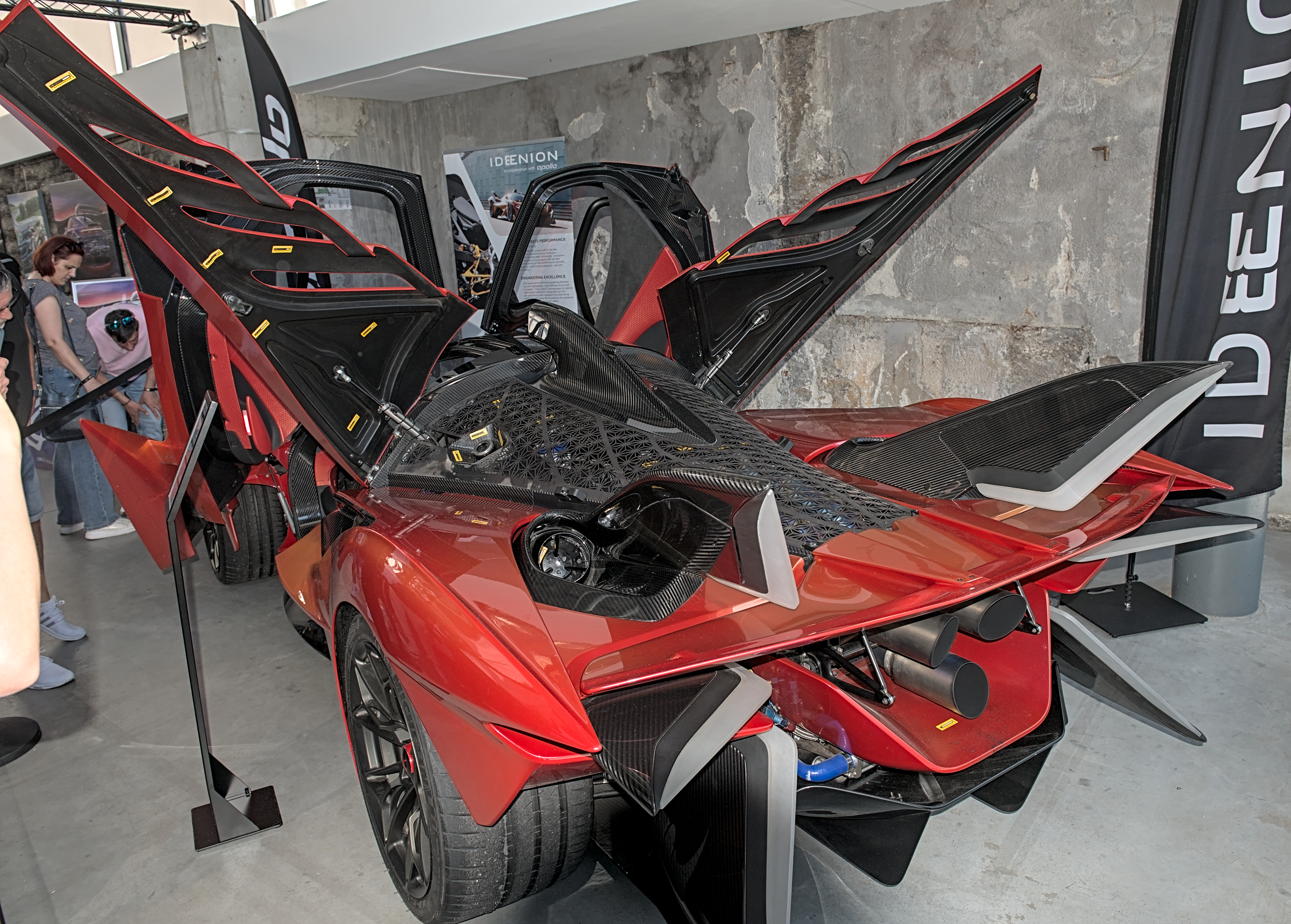
Rear view

The car was designed by the same designer as the Apollo Intensa Emozione, and the Apollo Arrow, Jowyn Wong.

Apollo says the Project EVO features a carbon fiber monocoque chassis, as well as active aerodynamics such as an electronically adjustable rear spoiler and aero fins.

It comes with a full range of active aerodynamics including a large retractable and adjustable rear spoiler, aero stabilizers and triangular air intakes that are clearly visible from the sides

It features a special gradient paint job, which changes from a bright red to a bright orange depending on the angle and lighting. The official models, similar to its Predecessor, the Apollo IE, will allow owners to customize their own paint jobs.

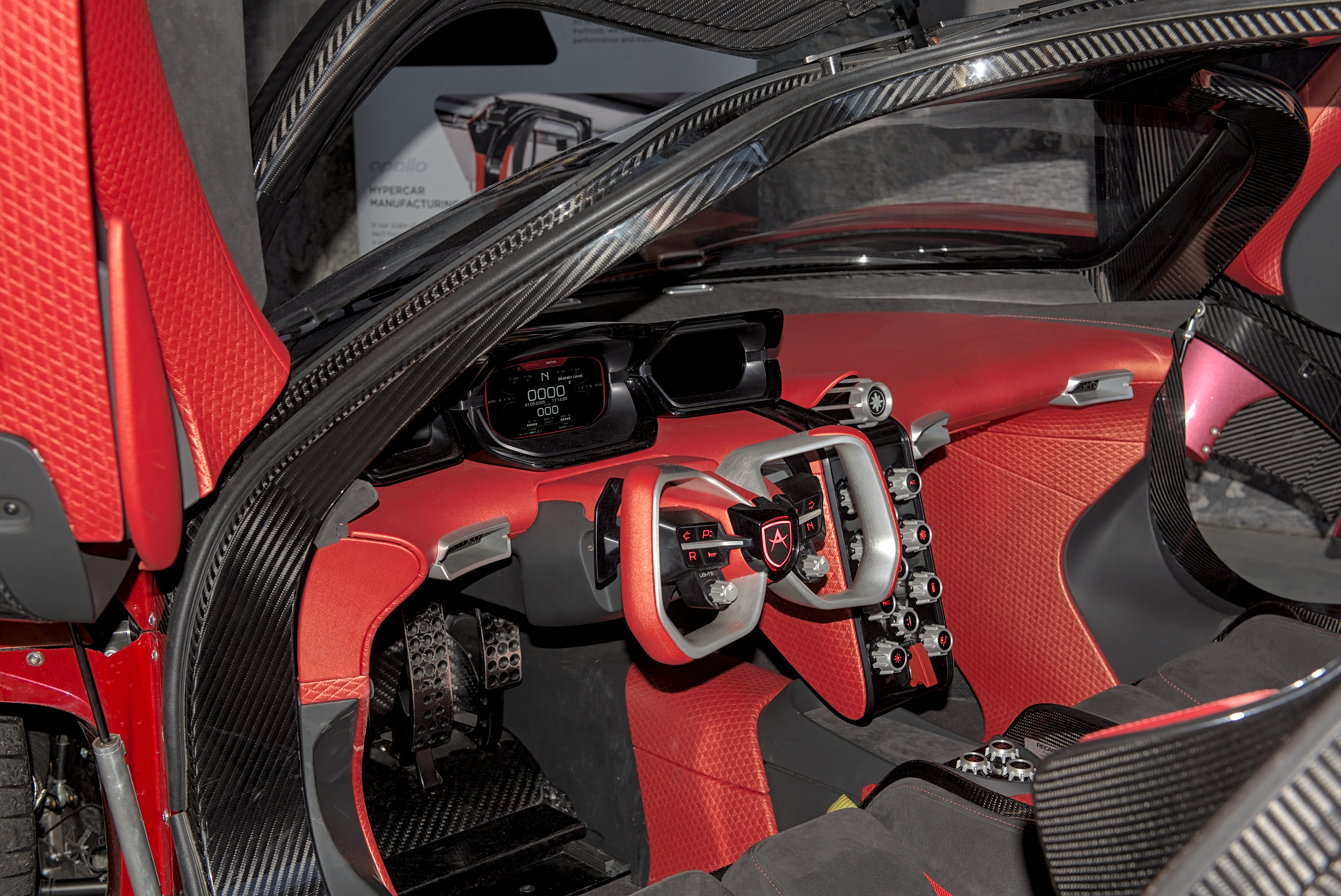
Interior

The interior is almost entirely orange and black (matching the exterior), with a few white accents such as on the inside of the steering wheel, vents, and buttons. It features 3 screens on the dash, directly above the steering wheel.

=== Performance ===
The Apollo Evo is powered by the same modified version of the same Ferrari derived 6.3 L F140E V12 engine developed by Autotecnica Motori and HWA AG used in the IE.

It has can accelerate from 0–100 km/h (62 mph) in under 2.8 seconds, although the exact number is yet to be confirmed.

== Production ==
Overall, ten Apollo EVOs are expected to be produced (not confirmed yet) with only 1 prototype, currently. Based on statements from official Apollo employees, the car will be priced at around US$3,000,000. It takes around 1,200 hours to make each unit, and ~600 hours to paint it.

The car is intended as a track car; however, there is a possibility it may be considered street-legal in some countries.
