= Roland Gumpert =

German engineer

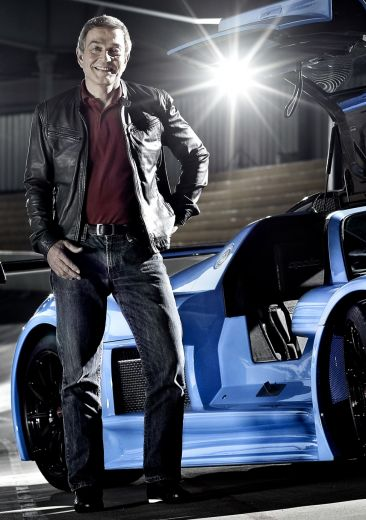
- Gumpert next to the Gumpert Apollo.
- Born: 10 December 1944 (age 81); Ziegenhals, Nazi Germany (now Głuchołazy, Poland)
- Known for: founder of Apollo Automobil and Gumpert Aiways Automobile

Roland Gumpert (born 10 December 1944) is a German engineer and founder of the sports car manufacturer Apollo Automobil. Gumpert is currently the managing director of the sports car manufacturer Gumpert Aiways Automobile, which he also founded.

== Biography ==
=== Engineer at Audi ===
Gumpert studied mechanical engineering at the Graz University of Technology. After graduating as a graduate engineer, he worked from 1969 as a test engineer for vehicle development at Audi AG in Ingolstadt. From 1972 he then worked as a test manager and type supervisor for the Audi 50. In 1974, Gumpert became head of the pre-development and testing department. Between 1975 and 1977, he developed a motorcycle for Audi, the Z02, which was rejected by the responsible Volkswagen manager. The selectable four-wheel drive of the Volkswagen Iltis was also one of his projects at this time. In 1977, Gumpert moved to the chassis and assembly testing department. Finally, in 1981 Gumpert became Head of Sport and Special Development at Audi Sport. Under his leadership as race director, Audi won 25 rounds of the world rally championship and 4 rally world championship titles.

In 1986, Gumpert was head of technical development overseas and in 1992, he was responsible for sales and marketing for the Asia-Pacific region. In 1999, Gumpert was appointed to the sales and marketing board member "VW-Audi Joint Venture China".

=== Managing director of Gumpert Sportwagenmanufaktur ===
Together with Roland Mayer, the owner of Motoren Technik Mayer, Gumpert developed the Gumpert Apollo super sports car. Gumpert left Audi AG in the same year when GMG Sportwagenmanufaktur Altenburg was founded. A year later, the factory, of which he became managing director, was renamed Gumpert Sportwagenmanufaktur. After the insolvency and the sale of the sports car manufacturer in 2014, Gumpert left it. This company was renamed Apollo Automobil GmbH after the acquisition by its new owner.

=== Gumpert Aiways Automobile ===
After a career break of several years, Gumpert returned in 2017 as CEO of Gumpert Aiways Automobile. As the leading developer of the methanol electric sports car Gumpert Nathalie, he has since been one of the pioneers of methanol fuel cell technology in the automotive industry.
