= Costruzione Italiana Macchine Attrezzi =

Italian transmission manufacturer

CIMA S.p.A.
- Industry: Industrial goods, automotive, auto racing, aerospace
- Founded: 1942
- Headquarters: Bologna, Italy
- Products: Gears; Transmissions; Engineering services
- Parent: Coesia Group
- Website: cimaingranaggi.it

Costruzione Italiana Macchine Attrezzi (CIMA, "Italian Machine Tool Company") is a gear, powertrain, and transmission manufacturer based in Bologna, Italy.

CIMA was founded in 1942 as a manufacturer of gear machining equipment before producing its own gears in 1946. Beginning in the 1950s CIMA supplied gears for automobile and motorcycle racing applications, including Scuderia Ferrari, (Note: Formula 1 cars and also the Ferrari 250 Testa Rossa) Porsche, Harley-Davidson, Minarelli, and Honda. In 1980 what is now the Coesia Group purchased CIMA, who went on to expand the into more machinery markets as well as marine applications. In the 1990s, CIMA expanded its reach to the aeronautical industry and found more success in racing. After advancing their low pressure vacuum carburizing and gas quenching methods in 2002, CIMA developed even higher performance transmissions for road and race applications. Their transaxles (Note: Configurations: dog engagement or synchronized; straight-cut or helical gears; manual, sequential, or automated manual; 6-speed up to 900 N⋅m (660 lb⋅ft) and 7-speed model T1107 with 1,100 N⋅m (810 lb⋅ft) torque capacity) are found in many low volume supercars. (Note: Notable examples: Apollo Arrow; Arrinera Hussarya; Hennessey Venom F5; Koenigsegg CC8S and Agera RS Gryphon; Pagani Zonda; Scuderia Cameron Glickenhaus SCG 003; Spania GTA Spano; SSC Tuatara; Zenvo ST1)
