= Apollo Intensa Emozione =

Mid-engine sports car manufactured by Apollo Automobil

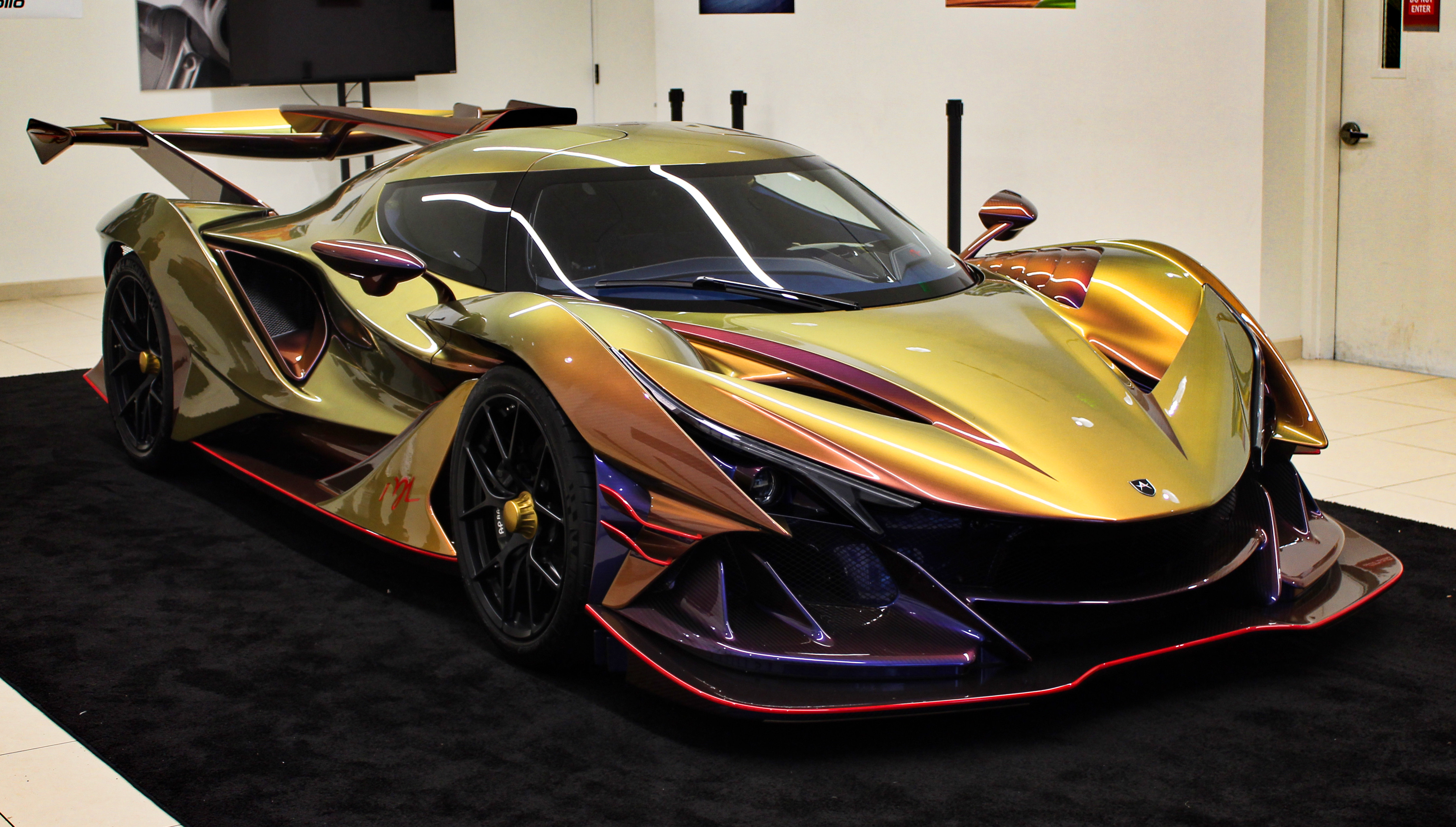

Overview
- Manufacturer: Apollo Automobil GmbH; Manifattura Automobili Torino
- Production: April 2019–present; 10 units produced, 2 prototypes
- Model years: 2019–present
- Assembly: Germany: Affalterbach
- Designer: Jowyn Wong

Body and chassis
- Class: Sports car (S)
- Body style: 2-door coupé
- Layout: Rear mid-engine, rear-wheel-drive
- Doors: Gullwing

Powertrain
- Engine: 6.3 L F140 V12
- Power output: 780 PS (574 kW; 769 hp); 760 N⋅m (561 lb⋅ft) of torque
- Transmission: 6-speed Hewland sequential with electro-pneumatic paddle-shift system

Dimensions
- Wheelbase: 2,700 mm (106.3 in)
- Length: 5,066 mm (199.4 in)
- Width: 1,995 mm (78.5 in)
- Height: 1,130 mm (44.5 in)
- Curb weight: 1,250 kg (2,755 lb)

Chronology
- Predecessor: Gumpert Apollo
- Successor: Apollo Project EVO

The Apollo Intensa Emozione, also known as Apollo IE, is a mid-engine sports car manufactured by German automobile manufacturer Apollo Automobil GmbH, in partnership with Manifattura Automobili Torino, designed by their chief designer Jowyn Wong. "Intensa Emozione" is Italian for "Intense Emotion".

The Intensa Emozione entered production in 2019, the first vehicle made by Apollo since the Gumpert Apollo went into production 14 years earlier. Apollo came out with a teaser video for the Intensa Emozione on October 17, 2017, and the car was fully revealed on October 24, 2017. In June 2018, Apollo revealed that the company would be partnering with HWA AG, a tuning and racing team spin-off from Mercedes-Benz tuner AMG, to complete the final stage of development for the car. The Intensa Emozione was priced at €2,300,000 in Europe and $2,670,000 in the United States. Only ten were produced, all of which had been reportedly sold.

== Vehicle information ==
=== Specifications and performance ===
The Intensa Emozione uses a Ferrari derived 6.3 L naturally-aspirated F140 V12 engine developed by Autotecnica Motori and HWA AG. The engine is rated at approximately 780 PS (574 kW; 769 hp) at 8,500 rpm and around 760 N⋅m (561 lb⋅ft) of torque at 6,000 rpm, and reportedly has a redline of 9,000 rpm. All of the power is sent to the rear wheels through a 6-speed Hewland sequential manual transmission. The weight stands at 1,250 kg (2,755 lb).

The dampers are built by Bilstein, and are three-way adjustable (comfort, sport, auto). The Intensa Emozione utilizes Brembo carbon ceramic brakes with sizes 380 x 34 mm at the front and rear along with 6-piston callipers up front and 4-piston callipers at the rear. Michelin supplies their Sport Cup 2 high performance tires for the cars, to allow for maximum performance and grip. Pankl Racing Systems is the supplier for the differential.

The Intensa Emozione is capable of accelerating from 0–97 km/h (60 mph) in 2.7 seconds, with a projected top speed of 335 km/h (208 mph). The car produces a maximum downforce of 1,350 kg (2,976 lb) at 299 km/h (186 mph).

=== Body construction ===
The Intensa Emozione is made almost entirely out of carbon fiber, but it does include high-strength steel, aluminium, and titanium components. The engine bay is left uncovered, allowing the air intake to operate with maximum efficiency. The entire chassis weighs only 105 kg (231 lb). The exposed carbon fiber body is offered in multiple colored finishes.

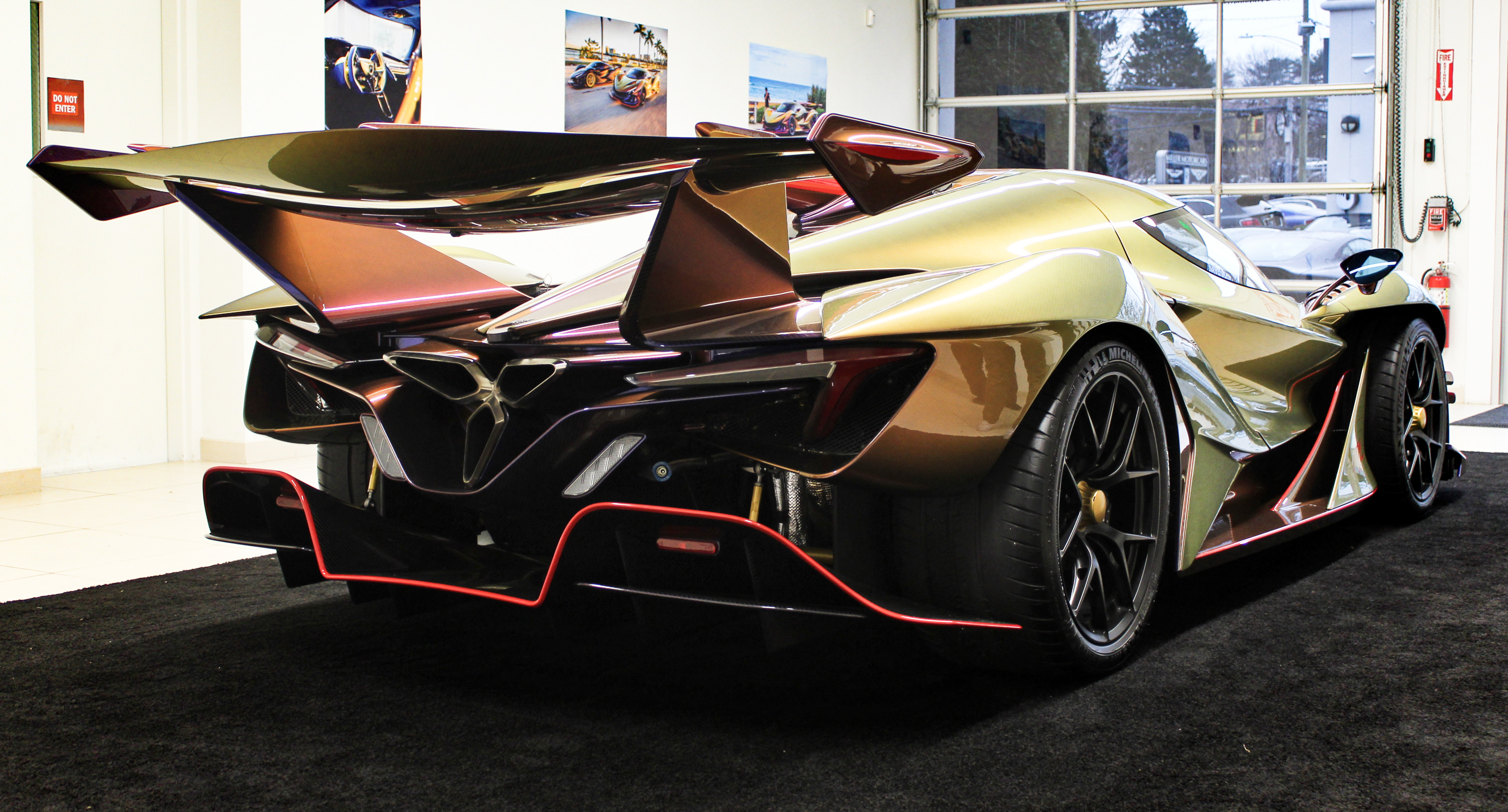
Rear View

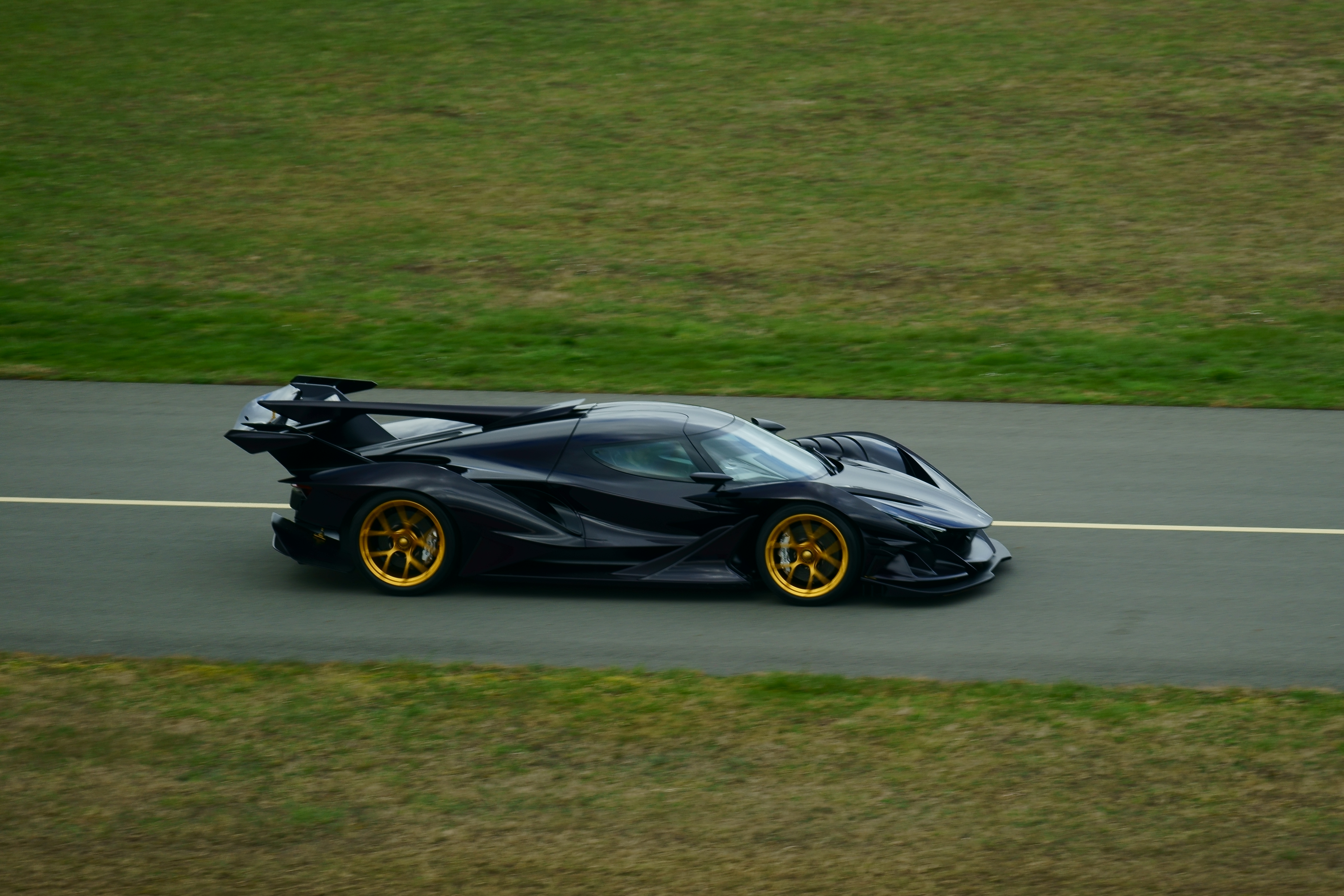
Apollo IE on track

== Production ==
Production of the Intensa Emozione started in April 2019 with deliveries beginning in the third quarter of 2019. The carbon fiber monocoque chassis of the car is produced by Capricorn Group and chassis adjustment along with final assembly are carried out by HWA AG. The car is assembled and completed in Affalterbach, Germany where HWA manufactures its race cars.

The second production Apollo IE was delivered in November 2019. This is also called the "ML" (initials of its Malaysian owner Michael Loke) version due to a very distinct colour scheme. Only ten Apollo IEs were produced, all of which had been reportedly sold.
