= Denkendorf, Bavaria =

Denkendorf
- Municipality
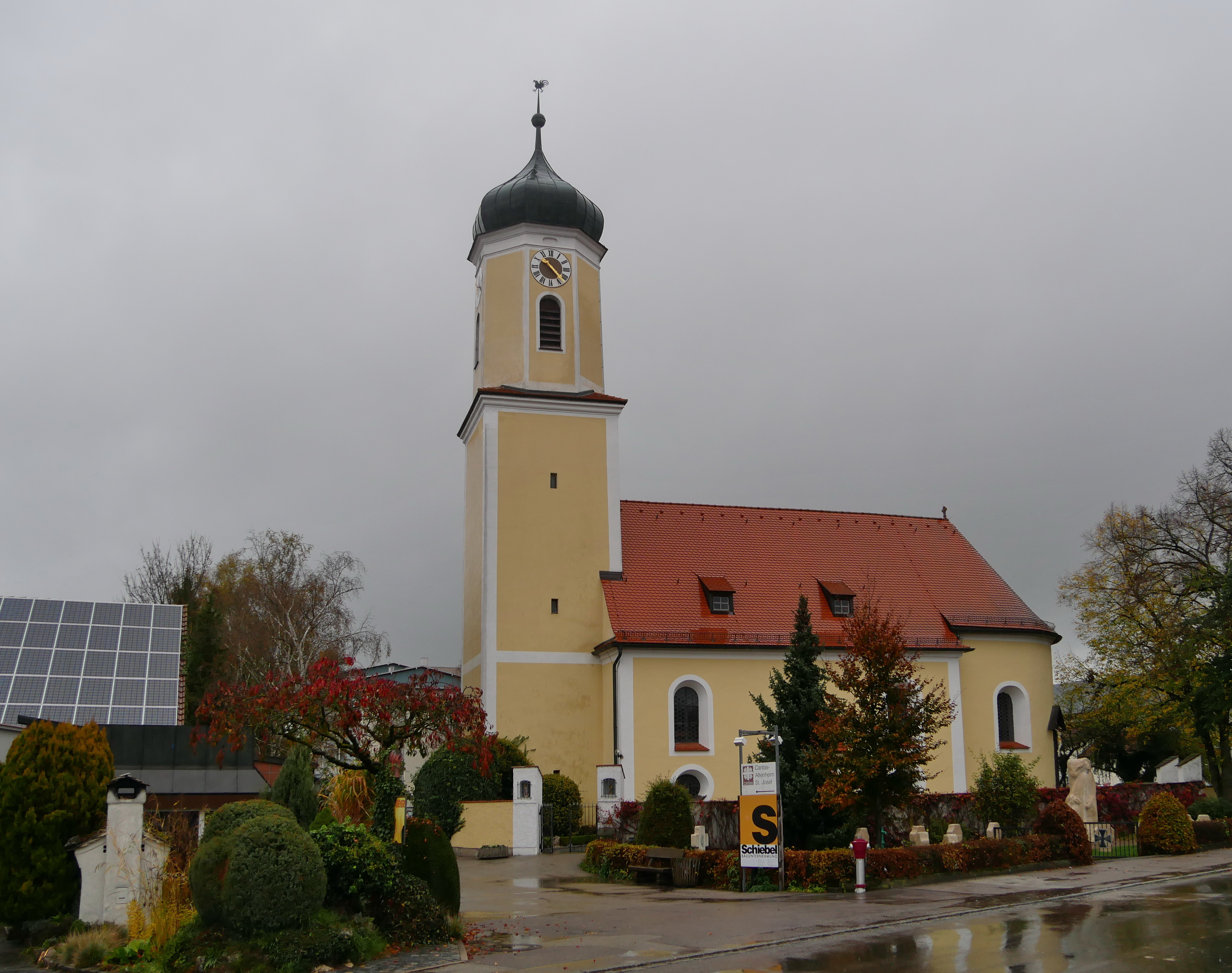
- Church of Saint Lawrence

- Coat of arms

- Location of Denkendorf within Eichstätt district
- Interactive map of Denkendorf
- Location within Germany Location within Bavaria
- Coordinates: 48°55′38″N 11°27′44.1″E
- Country: Germany
- State: Bavaria
- Admin. region: Oberbayern
- District: Eichstätt
- Subdivisions: 6 Ortsteile

Government
  - Mayor (2020–26): Claudia Forster (CSU)

Area
  - Total: 47.83 km^{2} (18.47 sq mi)
- Elevation: 480 m (1,570 ft)

Population (2025-12-31)
  - Total: 5,059
  - Density: 105.8/km^{2} (273.9/sq mi)
- Time zone: UTC+01:00 (CET)
  - Summer (DST): UTC+02:00 (CEST)
- Postal codes: 85095
- Dialling codes: 08466
- Vehicle registration: EI
- Website: www.gemeinde-denkendorf.de

Denkendorf (German pronunciation: [ˈdɛŋkn̩ˌdɔʁf]) is a municipality in the district of Eichstätt in Bavaria in Germany.

== Mayors ==
- since 2013: Claudia Forster (CSU/Christliche Wähler)
- 2008-2012: Jürgen Hauke (Christliche Wähler)
- 1996–2008: Josef Bienek (Freie Wähler-Free voters)
- 1978–1996: Alfons Weber
- 1964–1978: Michael Heggenberger
