= Wettstetten =

- Municipality
- Coat of arms

- Location of Wettstetten within Eichstätt district
- Interactive map of Wettstetten
- Location within Germany Location within Bavaria
- Coordinates: 48°50′N 11°25′E
- Country: Germany
- State: Bavaria
- Admin. region: Oberbayern
- District: Eichstätt

Government
  - Mayor (2020–26): Gerd Risch

Area
  - Total: 12.47 km^{2} (4.81 sq mi)
- Elevation: 386 m (1,266 ft)

Population (2025-12-31)
  - Total: 5,205
  - Density: 417.4/km^{2} (1,081/sq mi)
- Time zone: UTC+01:00 (CET)
  - Summer (DST): UTC+02:00 (CEST)
- Postal codes: 85139
- Dialling codes: 0841
- Vehicle registration: EI
- Website: www.wettstetten.de

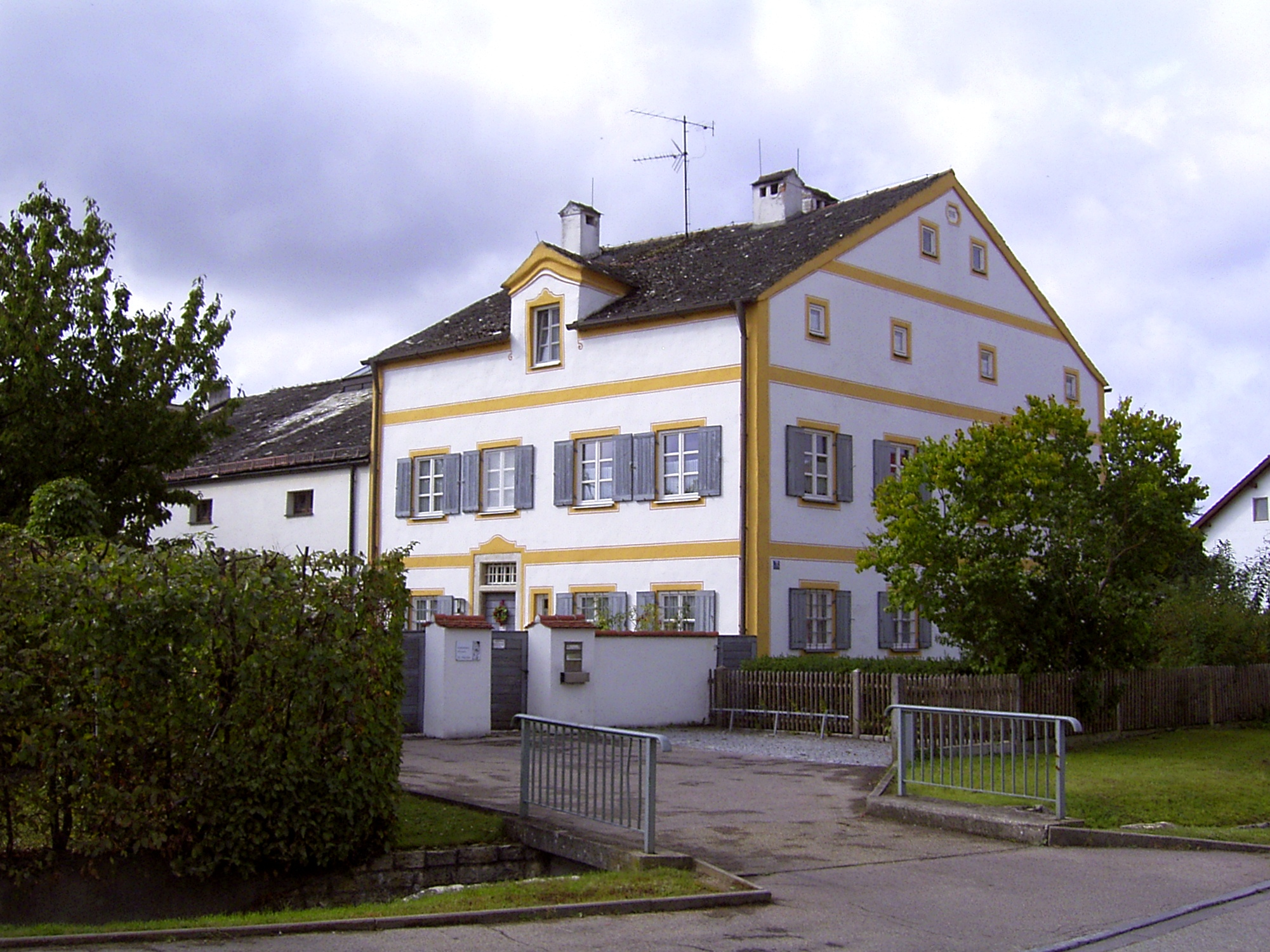
Rectory in Wettstetten

Wettstetten (German pronunciation: [vɛtˈʃtɛtn̩]) is a municipality in the district of Eichstätt in Bavaria in Germany.

== Mayors ==
Gerd Risch was elected mayor in 2014, and re-elected in 2020. He is the successor of Hans Mödl.
