= Gumpert Apollo =

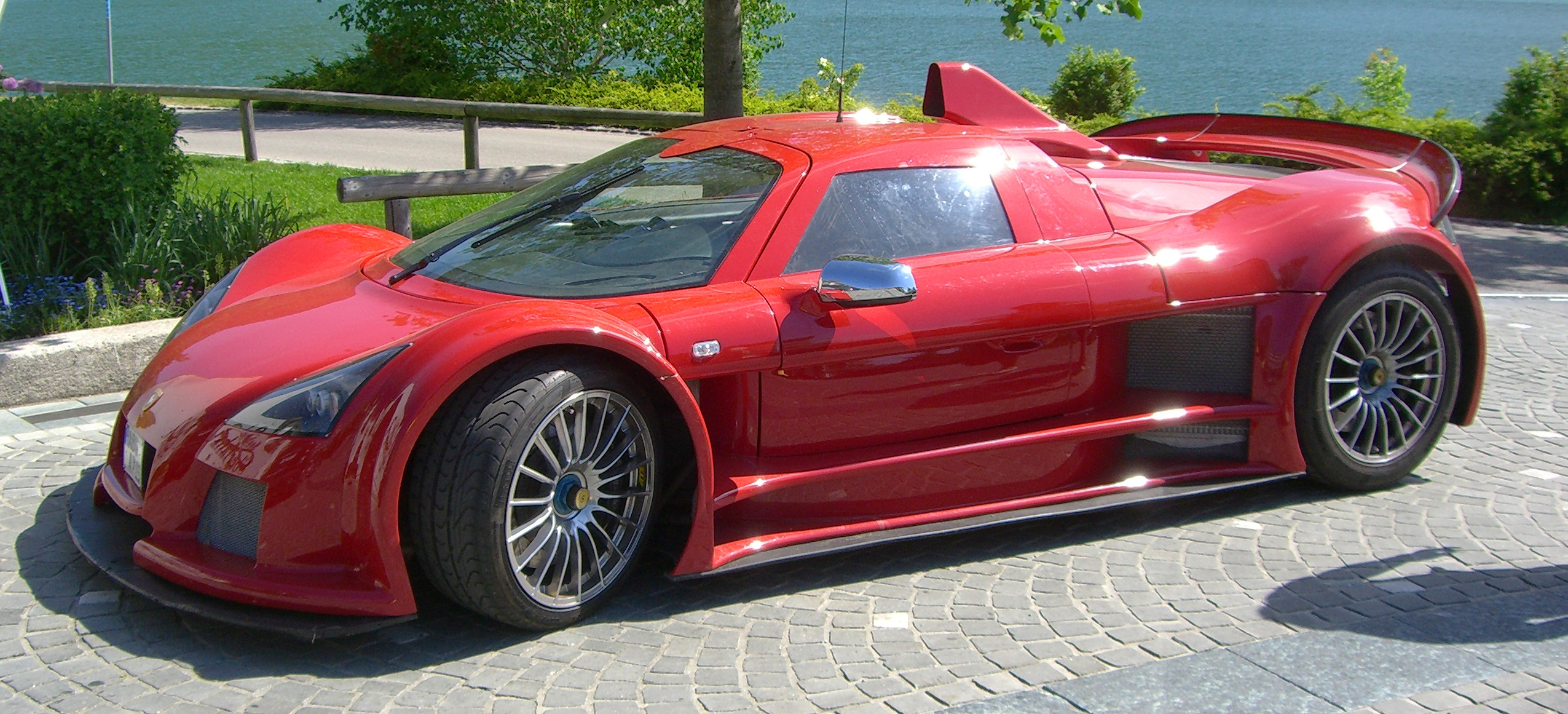

Overview
- Manufacturer: Gumpert
- Also called: Apollo N
- Production: 2005–2012; 44 produced
- Assembly: Germany: Altenburg
- Designer: Marco Vanetta

Body and chassis
- Class: Sports car (S)
- Body style: 2-door coupé
- Layout: Rear mid-engine, rear-wheel-drive
- Doors: Gullwing

Powertrain
- Engine: 4.2 L (260 cu in) twin-turbocharged V8
- Transmission: CIMA 6-speed sequential manual

Dimensions
- Wheelbase: 2,700 mm (106.3 in)
- Length: 4,460 mm (175.6 in)
- Width: 1,998 mm (78.7 in)
- Height: 1,114 mm (43.9 in)
- Curb weight: 1,100–1,200 kg (2,425–2,646 lb)

Chronology
- Successor: Gumpert Tornante; Apollo Intensa Emozione

The Gumpert Apollo is a sports car produced by German automotive manufacturer Gumpert Sportwagenmanufaktur GmbH in Altenburg. Gumpert filed for bankruptcy in August 2013, thereby ending the production of the Apollo.

== History ==
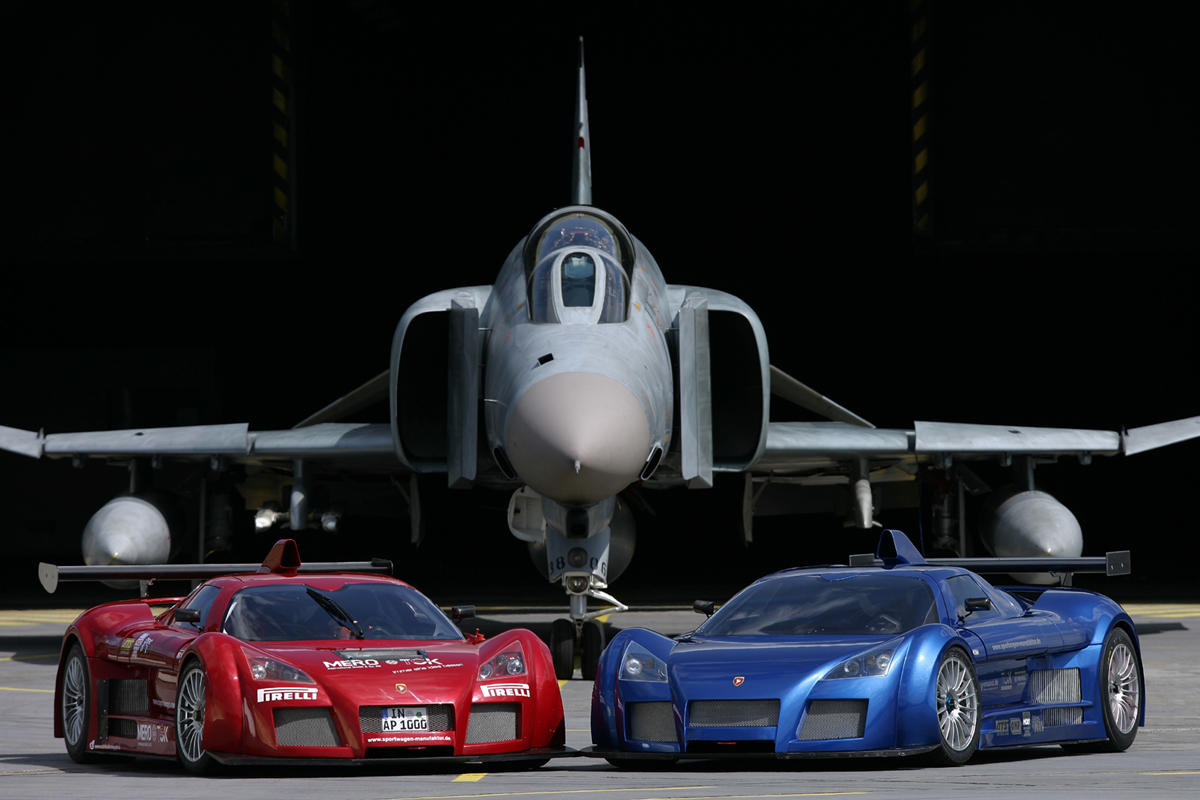
The two Gumpert Apollo Prototypes with an F-4 Phantom II

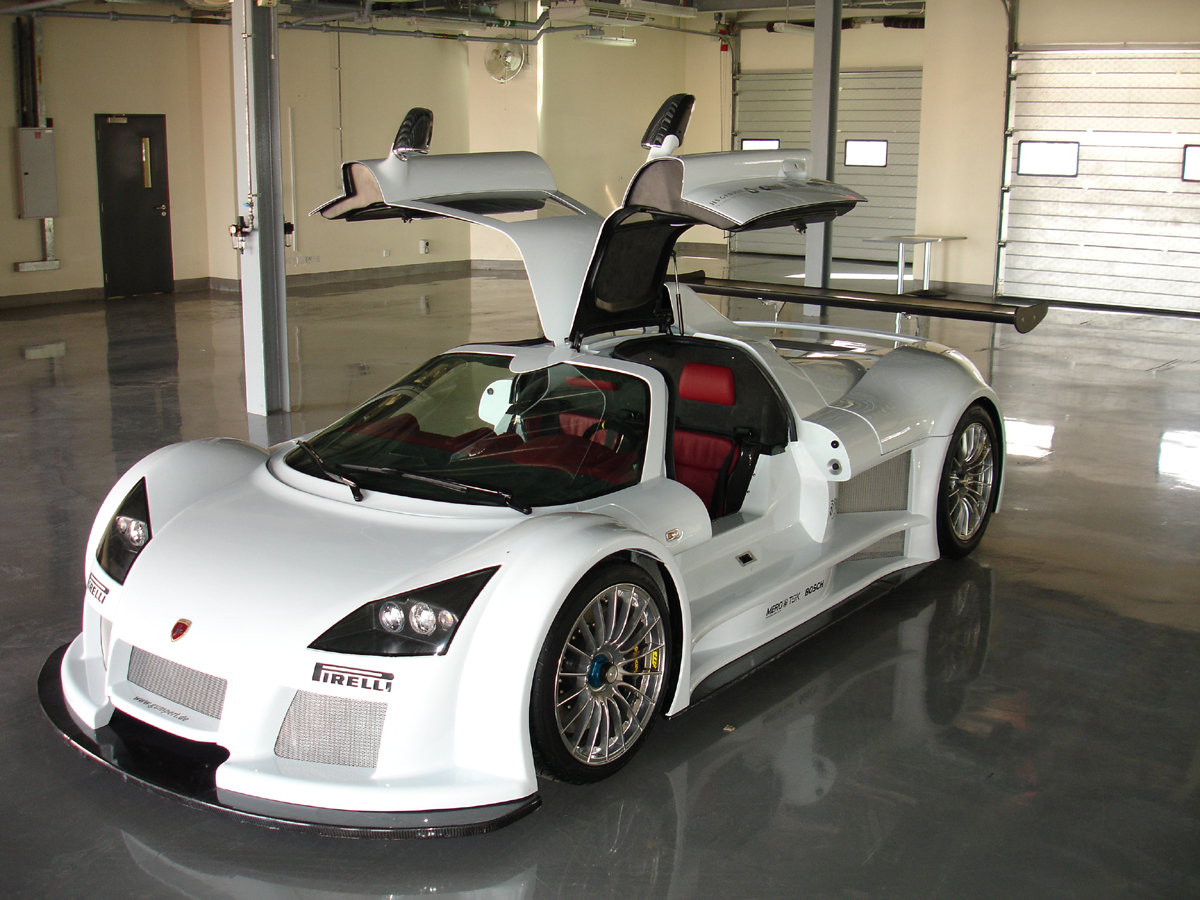
Pre-production car

In 2000, Roland Gumpert proposed a new generation of sports cars. One of the primary criteria for this car was that it be street-legal yet ready for the racetrack. He returned to Germany at the end of 2001, after over three years in China where he was the head of sales and marketing responsible for the development of the dealer network of the Audi-VW joint enterprise there. Subsequently, automobile designer Roland Mayer asked him if he would assist in building a prototype sports car. Audi approved Gumpert's involvement in this project, on the condition that, if they did eventually develop a new sports car, it would not be a prototype, but a series product.

The company, located in Altenburg, Germany was founded in 2004 under the name GMG Sportwagenmanufaktur Altenburg GmbH. The technical guidelines were defined and the first designs of the car were drawn by Marco Vanetta. Upon Vanetta's completion of this process, the first 1:4 scale model of Gumpert's car was produced in 2001.

Gumpert continued with the development of the Apollo, along with the Technical University of Munich and the Ingolstadt University of Applied Sciences. They assisted him with the constructional work, computer simulations, and wind tunnel tests. This research and development helped forming the blueprint for the first 1:1 scale model. Finally, two prototype cars were constructed. Production of the Apollo started in October 2005.

The philosophy behind this vehicle was to make Roland Gumpert's Le Mans dreams come true. A car homologated to race in the 24 Hours of Le Mans and also road-legal. Soon after the first fully functioning road car made its way to Europe, the car became fully road-legal and was sold in various Gumpert dealerships. Very soon after, car reviewers praised the car's speed and cornering. During a review in Autocar magazine, chief test driver Matt Prior stated that "the Apollo recalibrates the meaning of pure speed and driving feel." On Series 11 of Top Gear, the Apollo lapped the Top Gear test track in a time of 1:17.1, setting a record that lasted for 2 years until surpassed by the Bugatti Veyron Super Sport.

== Design ==
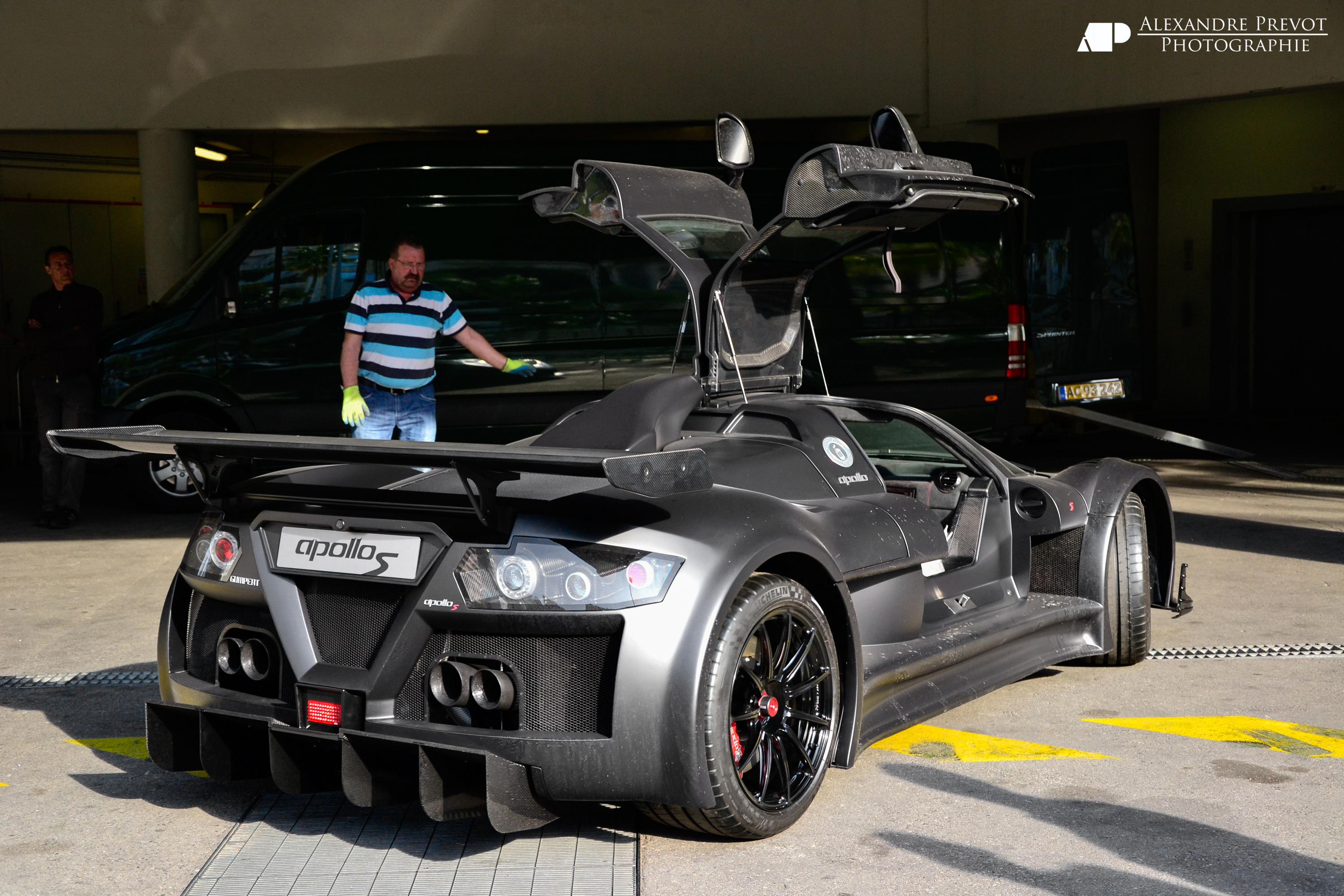
Rear view

The Apollo weighs between 1,100 kg (2,400 lb) and 1,200 kg (2,600 lb) (depending on options), and is fully street-legal. It is a mid-engine, rear wheel drive two-seater constructed on a tubular chromoly frame, with fiberglass or optional carbon fibre body panels. Gumpert claims the design of the Apollo is optimised so that the car could drive upside-down in a tunnel if driven at speeds over 306 km/h (190 mph), but this has not been tested.

The Apollo set a 7:11.57 lap time at Nürburgring achieved by German car magazine Sport Auto.

== Engine ==
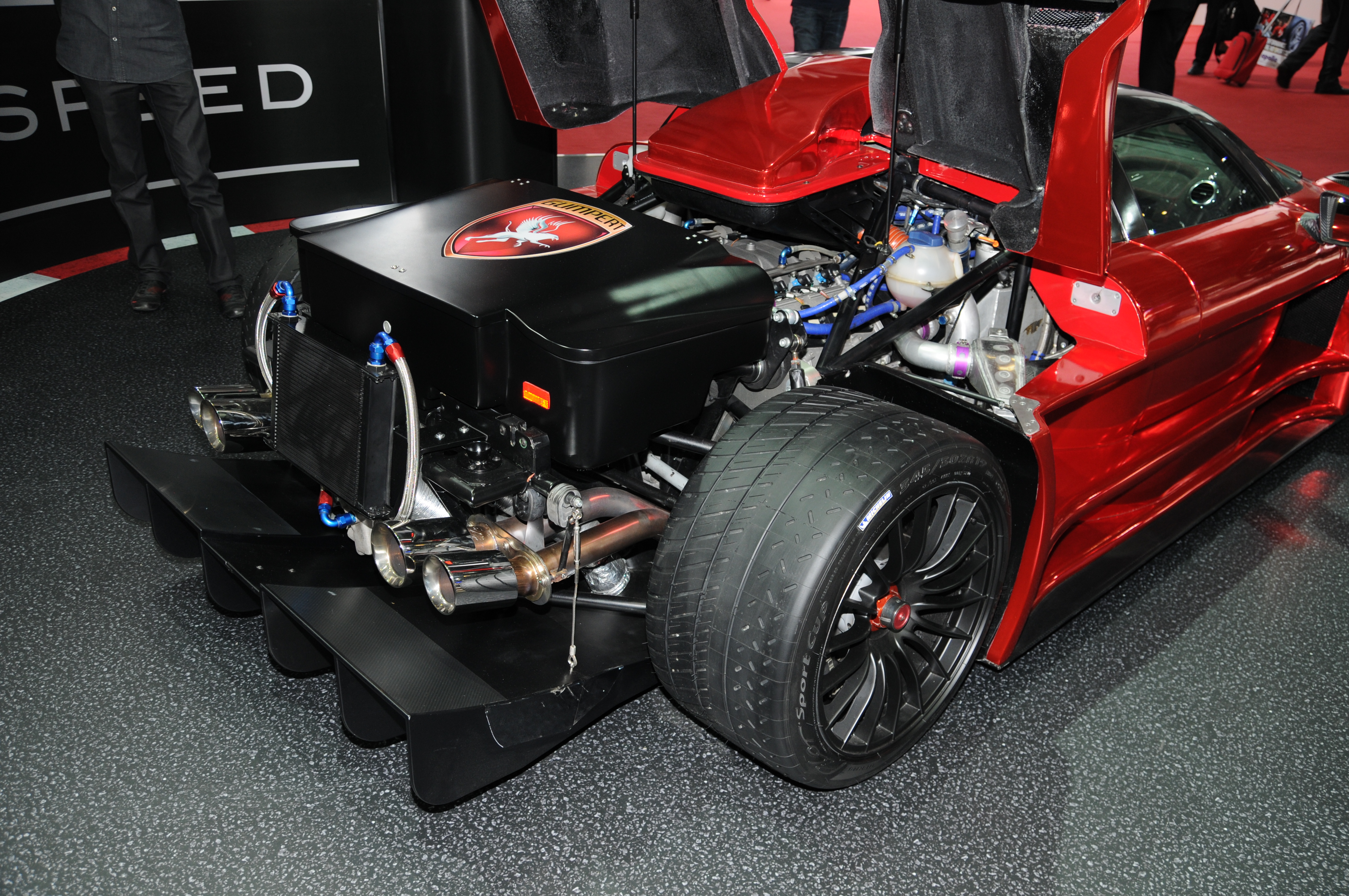
Engine bay

The Apollo uses a 4,163 cc bi-turbo intercooled version of the Audi V8 engine. The 90° V8 has a closed-deck light metal crankcase with dry sump lubrication. The light metal cylinder heads have five valves per cylinder, four overhead camshafts, VarioCam Direct variable valve timing on the intakes, and hydraulic valve clearance compensation. The double-flow exhaust system has four oxygen sensors to monitor the gas mixture, and a 3-way catalytic converter. Modern controls include an on-board diagnostic system, eight-coil electronic ignition, sequential multipoint fuel injection, and an electronic (drive by wire) accelerator system.

There were 3 engine types available:

- Base version - approximately 650 PS (478 kW; 641 bhp)
- Sport version - approximately 700 PS (515 kW; 690 bhp)
- Race version - approximately 800 PS (588 kW; 789 bhp)

Speed overview (650 hp):

- Top speed: 360.4 km/h (223.9 mph)
- 0-100 km/h (62 mph): 3.1 seconds
- 0-200 km/h (124 mph): 9.1 seconds
