= Qiantu Motor =

Chinese car company

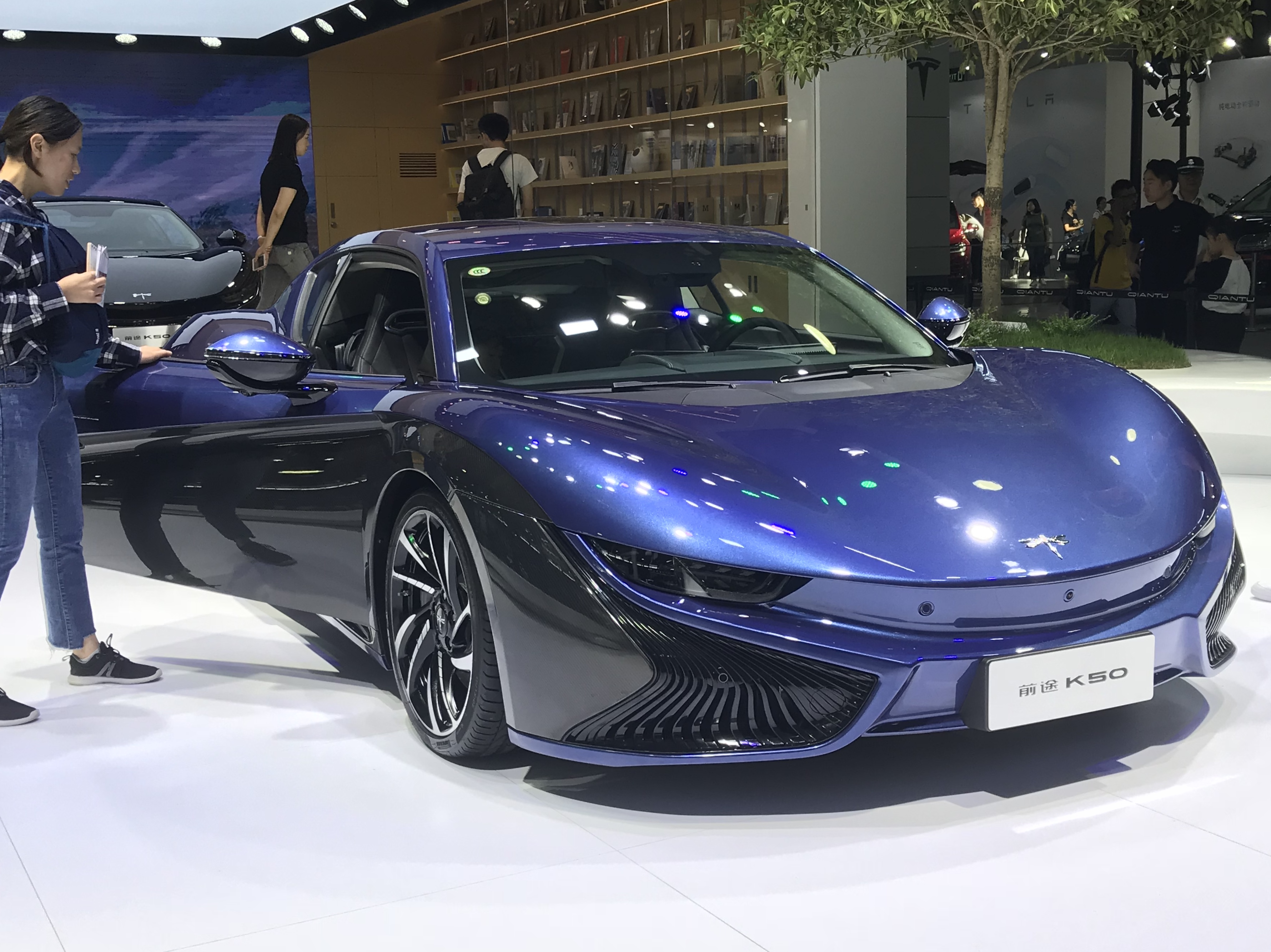
- Type: Public
- Industry: Automotive
- Founded: 2016; 10 years ago
- Founder: Lu Qun (陆群)
- Defunct: January 20, 2025; 20 months ago
- Fate: Bankruptcy liquidation
- Headquarters: Suzhou, China
- Area served: China
- Website: www.qiantumotor.com

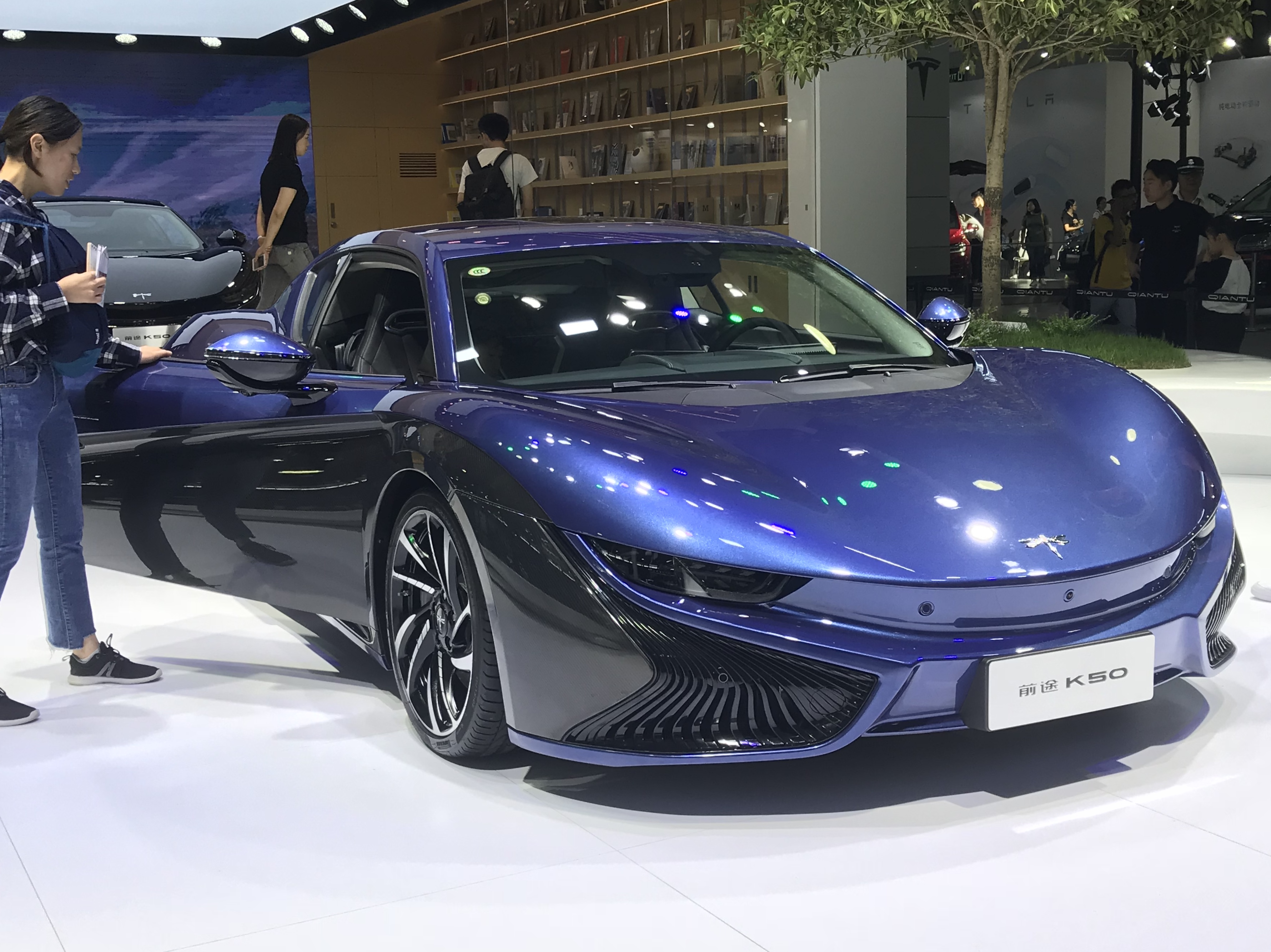

Qiantu Motor was a Chinese automobile manufacturer headquartered in Suzhou. It specialized in designing and developing electric vehicles.

== History ==
In 2010, a Chinese engineer and manager Lu Qun, who worked in the 1990s at a local automotive concern BAW, decided to establish, together with his business partners, Beijing Great Wall Huaguan Automobile Technology Co., Ltd. The goal was to construct the first in the history of Chinese motoring sports car with a purely electric drive. During the 2015 Shanghai Auto Show, the Qiantu brand presented its first production vehicle, a 2-door, 2-seater coupé called the K50 in pre-production form. A year later, during the Shanghai Auto Show 2016, the final, production-ready version of the vehicle was presented, whose production at the plant in Suzhou started in 2017.

At the 2018 Beijing Auto Show, Qiantu Motor unveiled two new prototypes announcing a luxury grand tourer called Concept 1 and a small sports car called K20. A year later, at the next edition of the capital China exhibition, Qiantu presented two more new studio announcements of new models that are to complement the manufacturer's portfolio in the future – the K25 and Concept 2. In December 2018, Qiantu announced that, in addition to its domestic Chinese market, it also plans to start selling on the American market. In April 2019, the manufacturer announced that K50 would be offered in partnership with the Californian company Mullen Technologies. The vehicle with this market in mind is to be delivered to customers under the name Mullen Dragonfly after completing the production facilities in Brea, which, however, was ultimately not implemented, and Qiantu Motors itself fell into crisis. In November 2020, the company ended production of the unpopular K50 after 2 years and suspended its operations.

In June 2022, Qiantu returned to operations after a two-year break, presenting its second production model, an evolution of the 2018 K20 Concept prototype. The car took the form of an affordable, city hatchback with a fully electric drive, going on sale immediately after its premiere in the Chinese market only. The company announced plans to restructure its operations, planning to expand its model range and expand its operations to foreign markets.

=== Bankruptcy ===
On January 20, 2025, Qiantu Motors (Suzhou) Co., Ltd., was declared bankrupt by the Suzhou High-tech Zone People's Court in Jiangsu Province. The bankruptcy application was filed by Senter Group Co., Ltd. and China Electronics Engineering Second Construction Co., Ltd., citing Qiantu Motors' inability to repay debts totaling approximately 72 million RMB and its insufficient assets to cover liabilities.

The court ruled that Qiantu Motors was insolvent, with no viable evidence to counter the claims of its inability to repay debts. Although Qiantu Motors argued that it retained valuable assets, including its new energy vehicle license, vehicle models, and technical team, the court dismissed its objections. The company's hopes for external financing and overseas market expansion were insufficient to avert bankruptcy. Then, on January 24, 2025, Qiantu's parent company CH-Auto filed for bankruptcy liquidation, and they failed to open an IPO in the USA.

== Products ==
- K20 (cancelled), subcompact hatchback
- K50 (2018–2020), sports car, BEV
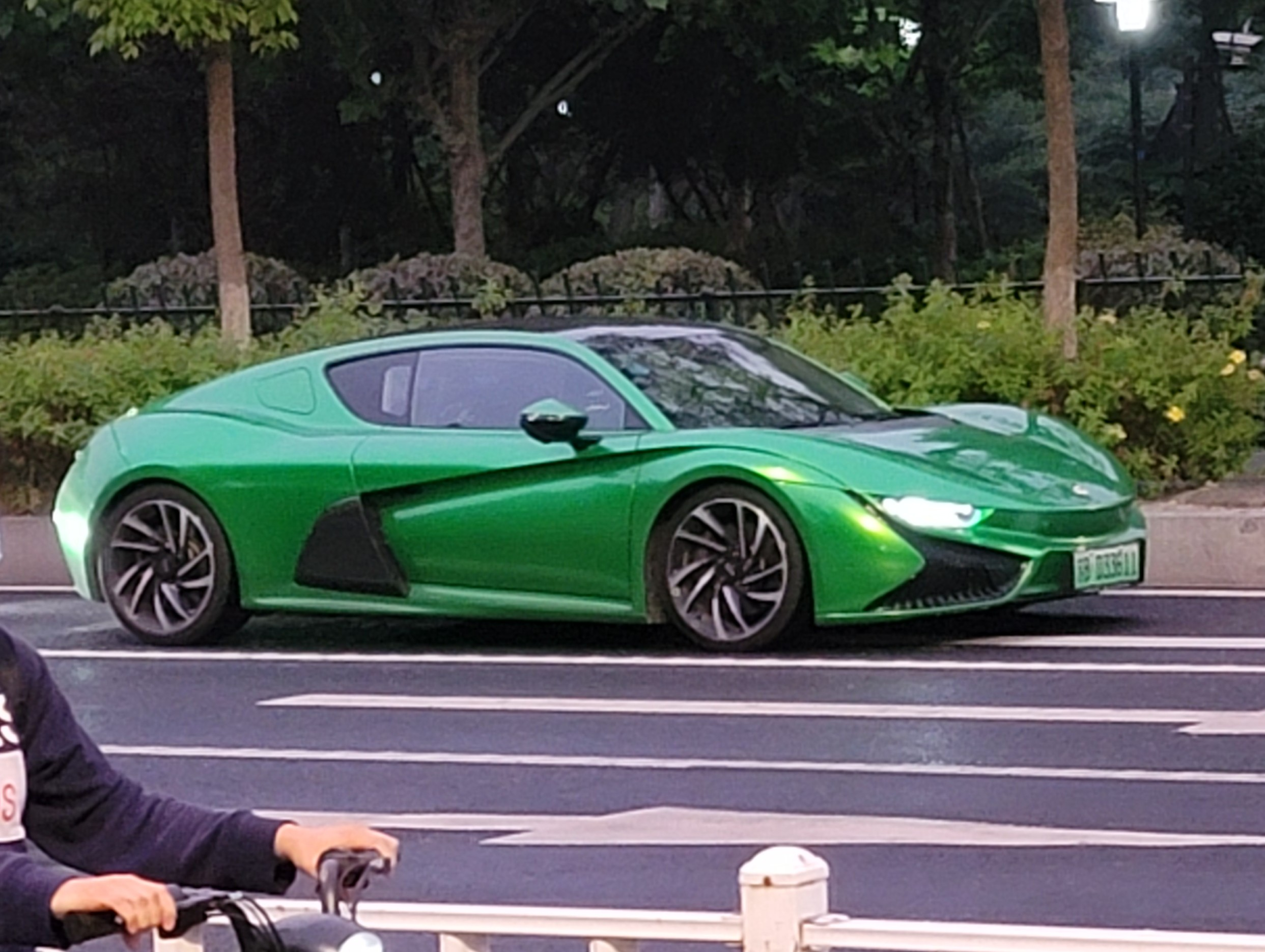
Qiantu K50

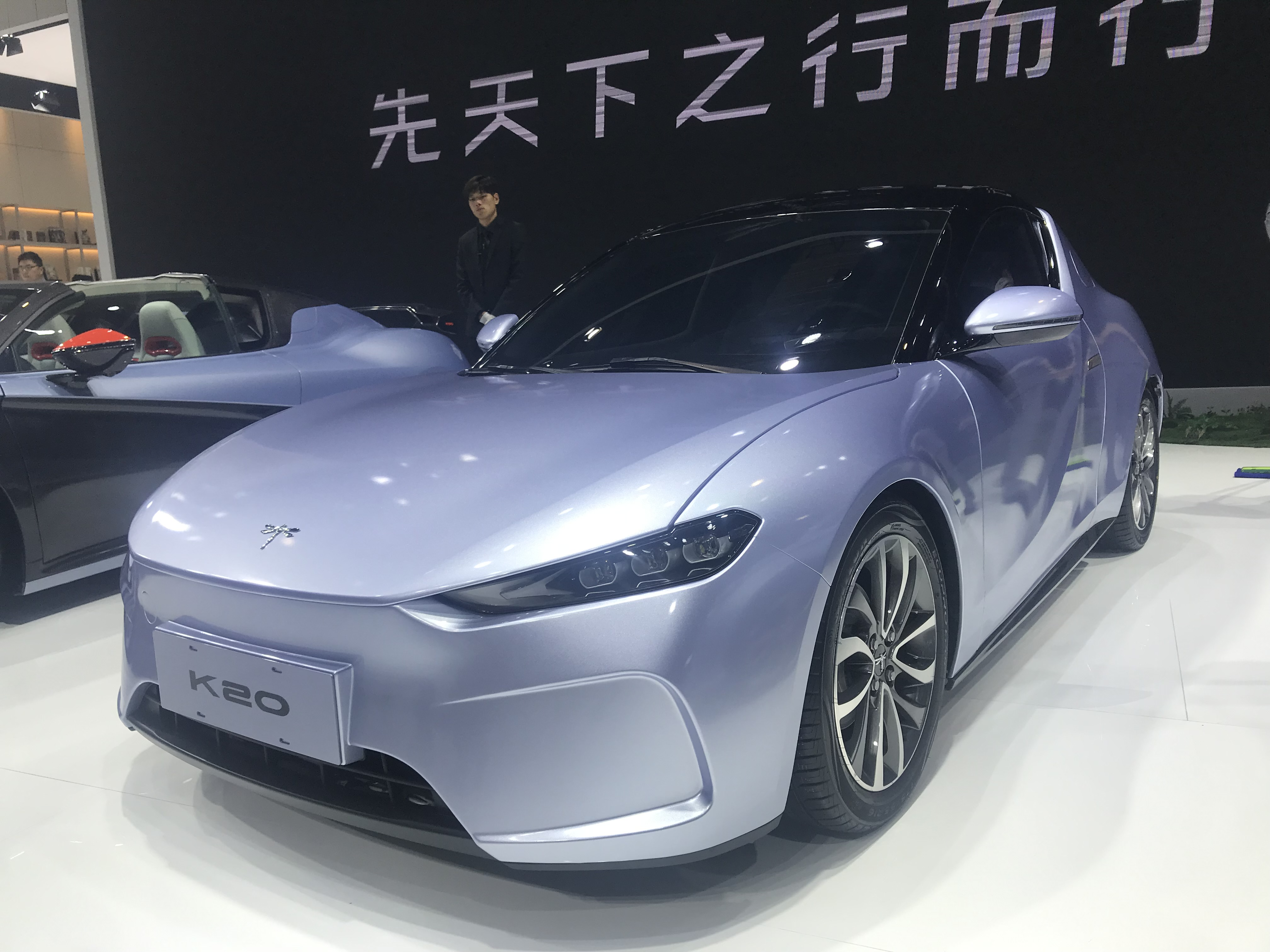
Qiantu K20

== Concepts ==
- Qiantu K50 Concept (2015)
- Qiantu Concept 1 (2018)
- Qiantu K20 Concept (2018)
- Qiantu Concept 2 (2019)
- Qiantu K25 Concept (2019)
