= Beijing Henrey Automobile Technology =

Chinese electric vehicle manufacturer

- Founded: 2010
- Headquarters: Tongzhou District, Beijing, China
- Area served: China, Nepal
- Products: Automobiles
- Website: www.henrey.cn/en/

Beijing Henrey Automobile Technology Co., Ltd. (Chinese: 北京宏瑞汽车科技股份有限公司; pinyin: Běijīng Hóngruì Qìchē Kējì Gǔfèn Yǒuxiàn Gōngsī) (also known as Henrey Automobile (Chinese: 宏瑞汽车; pinyin: Hóngruì Qìchē)) is an battery electric vehicle company. It was founded in Beijing Zhongguancun Science and Technology Park in May 2010.

Henrey automobile has three subsidiaries: Henan Henrey Automobile Co., Ltd., Yantai Henrey Automobile Co., Ltd. and Xuchang Herun electromechanical Co., Ltd.

== History ==
Henrey Automobile was founded in May 2010 in Beijing with the aim of research and development in the field of small urban electric cars. Henrey's activities included independent development of not only the structure of the body and floor panel and suspension system, but also the engine, battery and driver support systems. Preparations for the premiere of the first Henrey car took a total of 10 years, resulting in the presentation in 2020 of the urban hatchback under the Xiaohu brand in the form of Xiaohu FEV. The car was developed with the domestic Chinese market in mind, but, in 2022, local companies expressed interest in importing it under their own name, including: in Thailand and Pakistan, as well as the American startup Mullen Technologies.

== Models ==
- Xiaohu FEV (Family Electric Vehicle), available in both 3 and 5-door configurations.
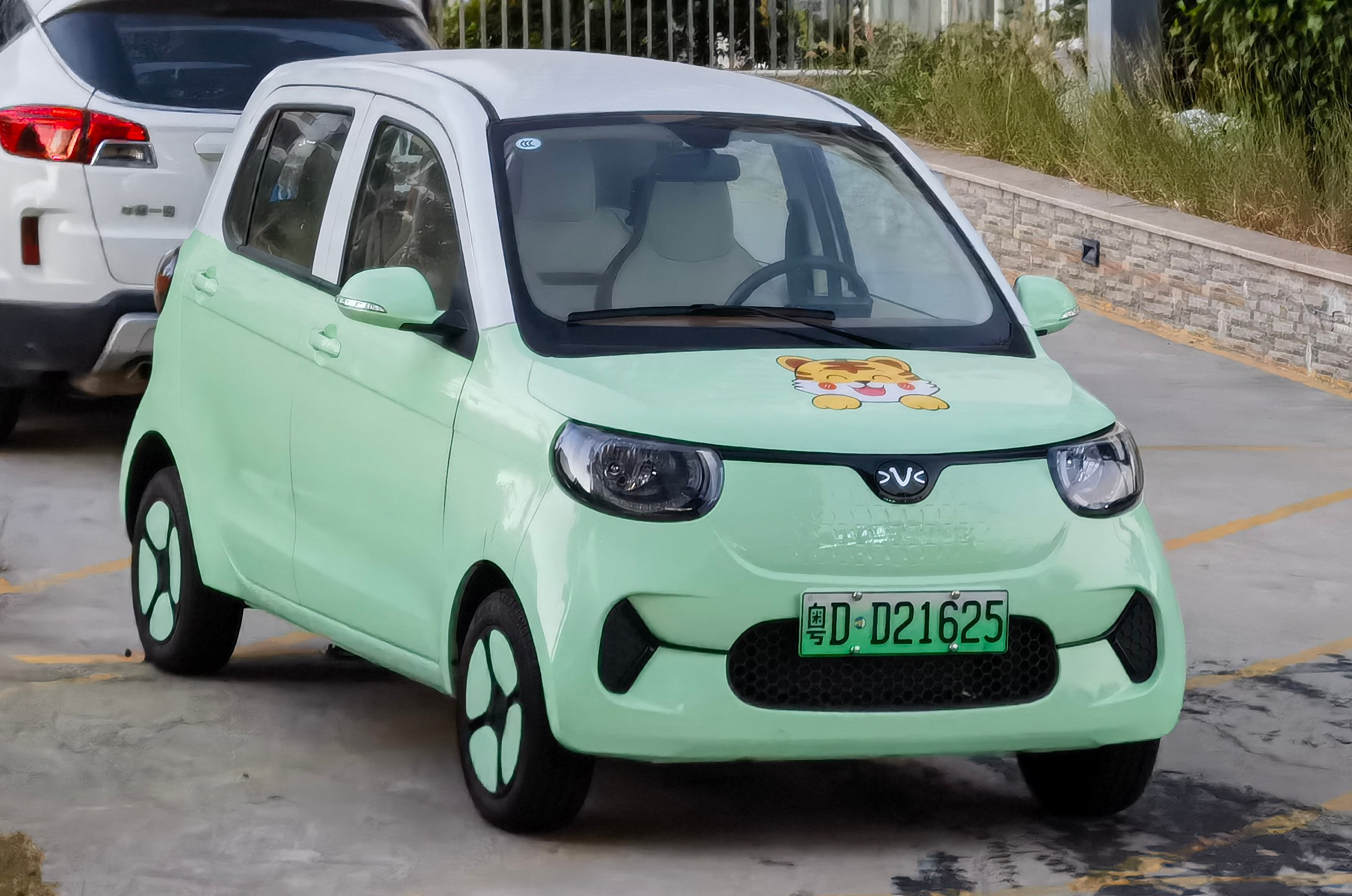
5-door Xiaohu FEV
