= Qiantu K20 =

Battery electric subcompact hatchback

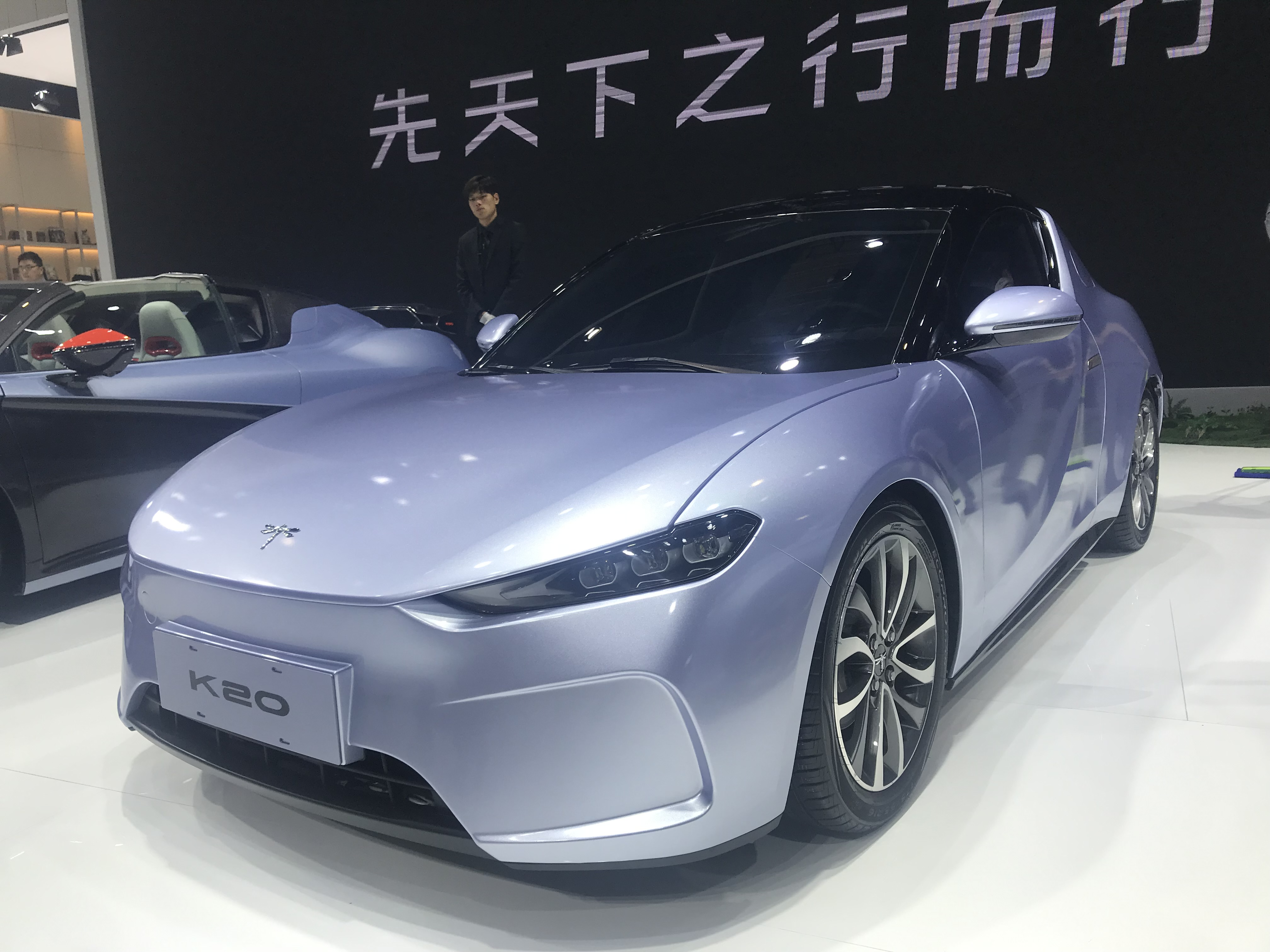

Overview
- Manufacturer: Qiantu Motor
- Production: Cancelled
- Assembly: China: Suzhou, Jiangsu

Body and chassis
- Class: Subcompact car (B)
- Body style: 3-door hatchback
- Layout: Front-motor, all-wheel-drive

Powertrain
- Electric motor: Permanent magnet synchronous motor
- Power output: 214 hp (217 PS; 160 kW)
- Transmission: 1-speed direct-drive
- Electric range: Up to 500 km (311 mi)

Dimensions
- Wheelbase: 2,326 mm (91.6 in)
- Length: 3,741 mm (147.3 in)
- Width: 1,624 mm (63.9 in)
- Height: 1,263 mm (49.7 in)
- Curb weight: 780 kg (1,719.6 lb)

The Qiantu K20 is a battery electric subcompact hatchback produced by Qiantu Motor.

== Overview ==
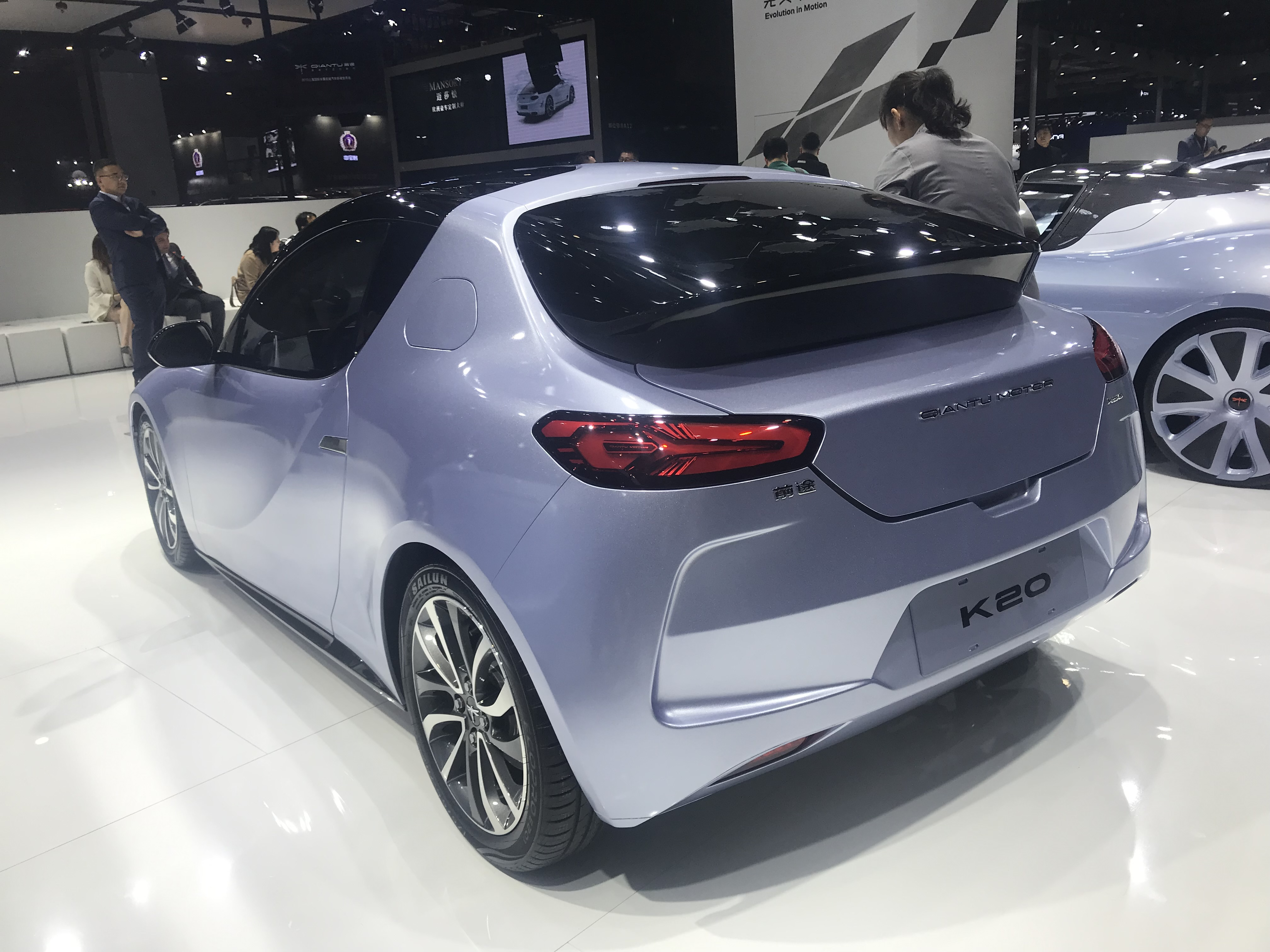
Rear view

In 2019, Qiantu Motor presented a prototype of a small electric car Qiantu K20 Concept and the production version of the K20 debuted two years later on the occasion of the company's return to the market after financial problems. The subcompact hatchback received an avant-garde silhouette with an extensive set of embossments enabling two-color body painting and a wide package of vehicle styling personalization depending on the buyer's preferences.

The K20 went on sale right after its premiere in June 2022, limited only to the Mainland Chinese market. The car was distinguished by the manufacturer's aggressive pricing policy, which assumed relatively low values, from 86,800 yuan for the basic variant and 149,800 yuan for the top version.

== Powertrain ==
The K20 is a fully electric car powered by a drive system that transmits power to both axles using a package of two electric motors with a power of 214 hp (160 kW) and 290 N⋅m (214 lbf⋅ft) of maximum torque. Acceleration from 0 to 100 km/h (62 mph) takes 4.7 seconds, with a total weight of 780 kg (1,720 lb). The car can travel approximately 500 kilometers on one charge.
