= Xiaohu FEV =

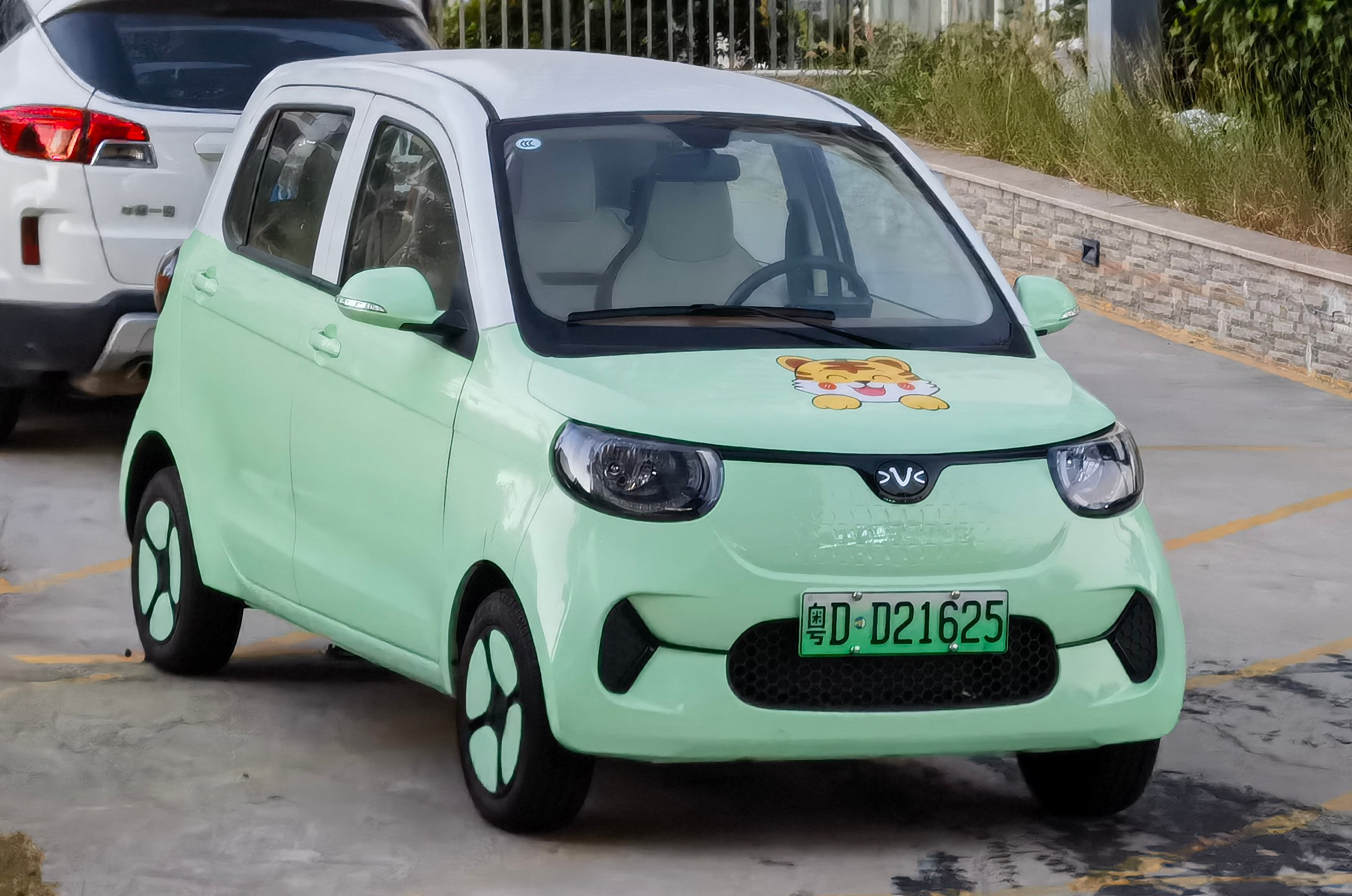

Overview
- Manufacturer: Beijing Henrey Automobile Technology
- Also called: Hongrui Xiaohu; Henrey Little Tiger; Henrey Mincar (Nepal); Lojo T300; Mullen I-Go; Volt City EV (Thailand); Rinco Aria (Pakistan); Apatech Ohkuma (Japan)
- Production: November 2021–present 2022–present (Mullen Go); 2022–2024 (Volt City EV)
- Assembly: China: Beijing

Body and chassis
- Class: City car
- Body style: 5-door hatchback (FOR-Four, Mullen Go); 3-door hatchback (FOR-Two)
- Layout: Rear-motor, rear-wheel-drive

Powertrain
- Electric motor: 1x AC PMSM
- Power output: 34 kW (46 hp; 46 PS)
- Transmission: 1-speed direct-drive
- Battery: Li-ion battery: 16.5 kWh
- Electric range: 200 km (120 mi)

Dimensions
- Wheelbase: 1,980 mm (78.0 in) (FOR-Two); 2,440 mm (96.1 in) (FOR-Four)
- Length: 2,920 mm (115.0 in) (FOR-Two); 3,380 mm (133.1 in) (FOR-Four)
- Width: 1,499 mm (59.0 in)
- Height: 1,610 mm (63.4 in)
- Curb weight: 680 kg (1,499 lb) (FOR-Two); 765 kg (1,687 lb) (FOR-Four)

The Xiaohu FEV (Family Electric Vehicle) (Chinese: 小虎FEV), also known as the Mullen Go, is an electric city car produced by Beijing Henrey Automobile Technology.

== Overview ==
Mullen Technologies unveiled a rebadged version in October 2022, which includes a 16.5 kWh battery pack that provides 124 mi (200 km) of range in the New European Driving Cycle.

In 2022, the Xiaohu FEV received an update, gaining more autonomy.

=== Powertrain ===
The battery powers a 46 hp (34 kW) electric motor and allows the vehicle to reach a top speed of 62 mph (100 km/h).

== Sales ==
Year	Sales	
Year	China (Note: Figures for Xiaohu FEV)	Thailand (Note: Figures for Volt City EV and based on registration (Thailand))
2021	1,368	
2022	4,408	
2023	979	405
2024	473	54
