= Qiantu K50 =

Sports car

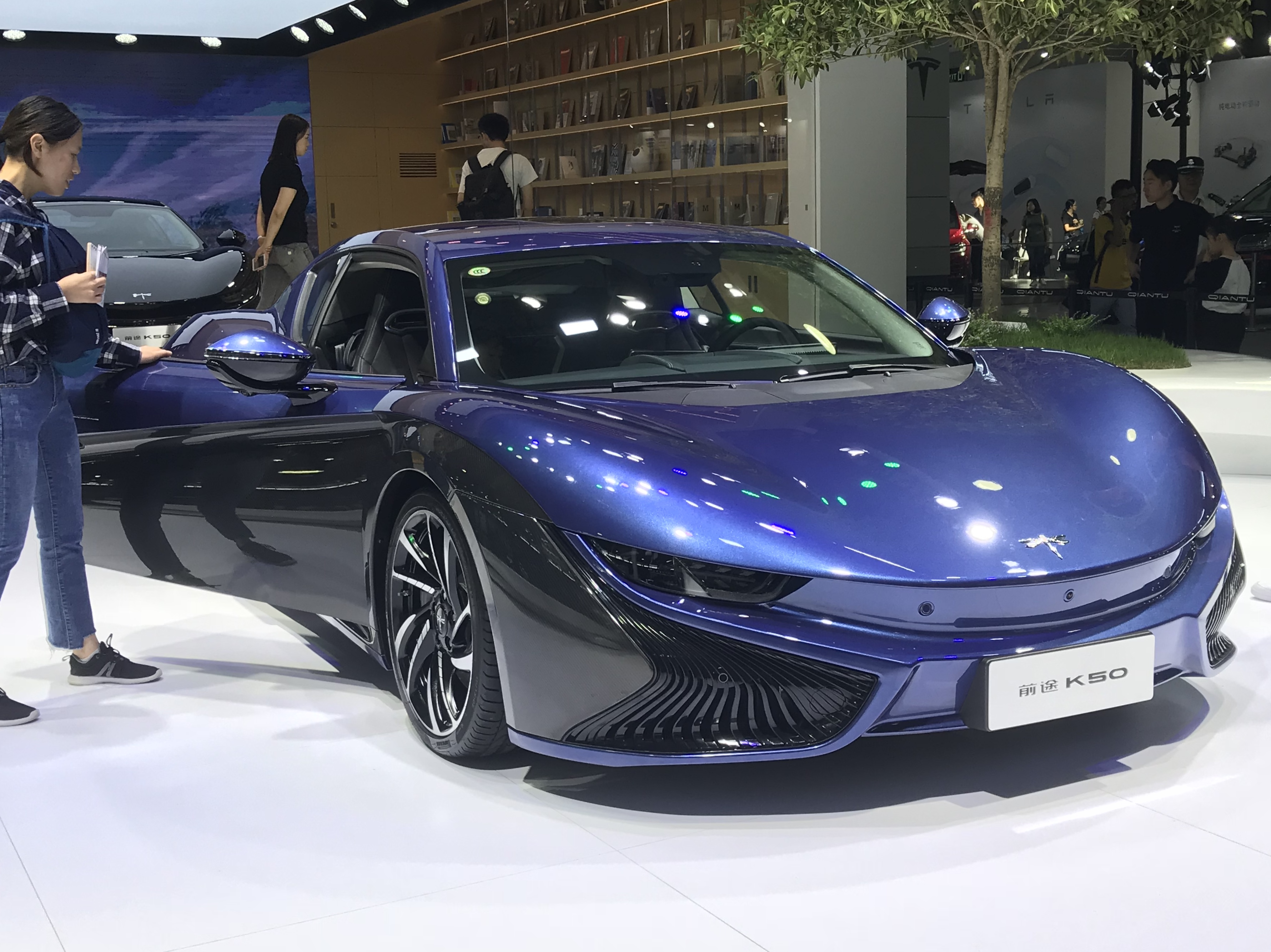
- The Qiantu K50 display at the 2018 Pudong Auto Show in China

Overview
- Manufacturer: Qiantu Motor
- Also called: Dragonfly K50; Mullen Dragonfly K50
- Production: 2018–2020 (1,000 Units)
- Assembly: China: Suzhou, Jiangsu; United States: Brea
- Designer: Daniel Darancou

Body and chassis
- Class: Sports car (S)
- Body style: 2-door coupé
- Layout: Individual-wheel drive

Powertrain
- Electric motor: Two 188hp 580Nm electric motors, making for a total of 376hp
- Battery: 78.1kWh lithium-ion
- Electric range: 365 km (230 miles)

Dimensions
- Wheelbase: 2,650 mm (104.3 in)
- Length: 4,628 mm (182.2 in)
- Width: 2,064 mm (81.3 in)
- Height: 1,254 mm (49.4 in)
- Curb weight: 1,900 kg (4,200 lb)

The Qiantu K50 is a battery electric sports car designed and manufactured by the Chinese automotive manufacturer Qiantu Motor beginning in 2018 and ending in November 2020.

== Overview ==
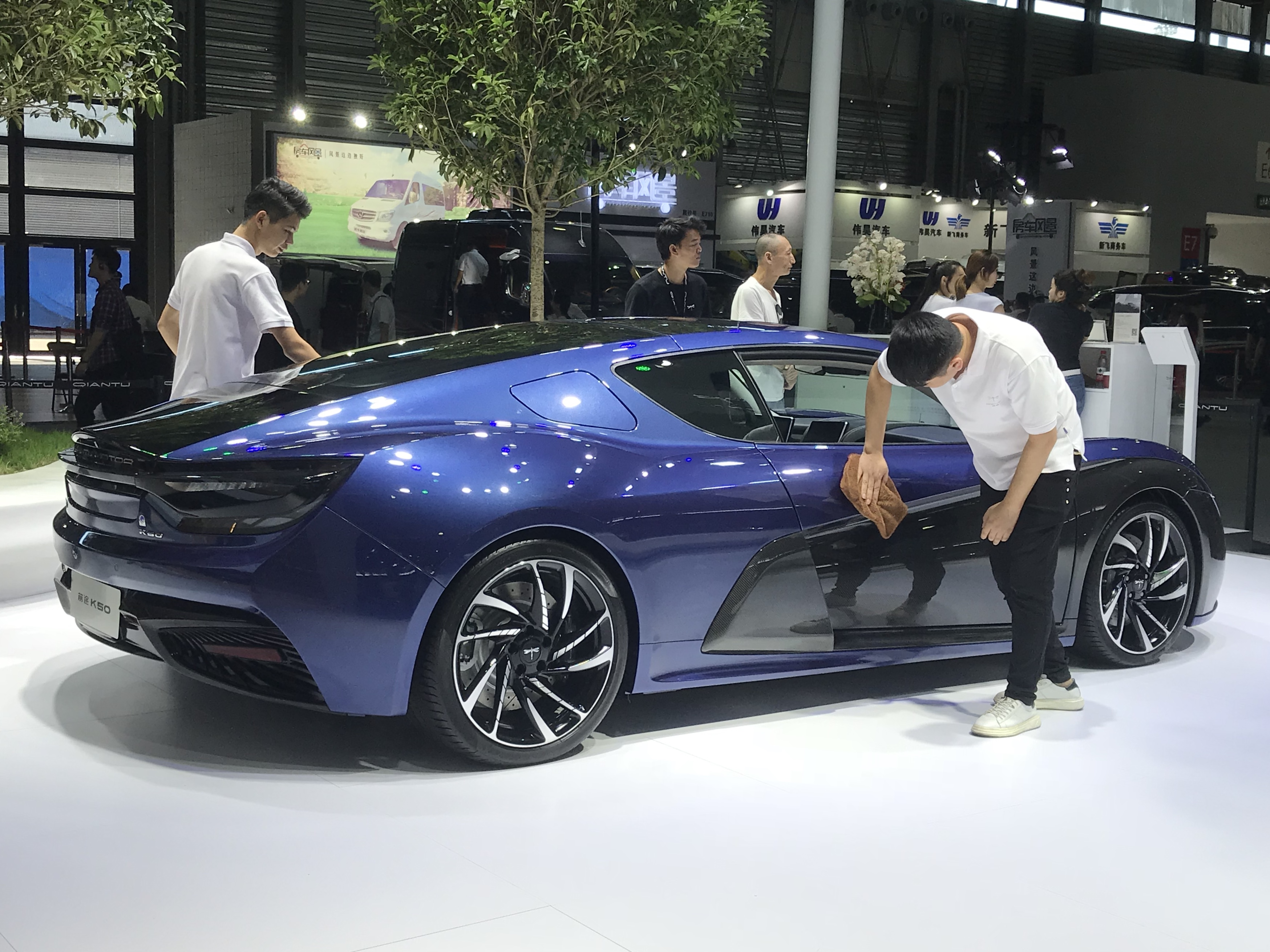
Rear view

Unveiled at the 2015 Shanghai Auto Show, the production Qiantu K50 was revealed during the 2016 Beijing Auto Show and was planned to launch on the Chinese car market in 2016, before finally launching in 2018.

The Qiantu K50 sports car is based on the CH Auto Event concept previously debuted at the Beijing Auto Show. Production was confirmed in October 2014. CH Auto, a Chinese automotive research & development company, is the largest shareholder of Qiantu, the manufacturer of the Qiantu K50.

The Qiantu K50 Roadster debuted at the 2016 Beijing Auto Show as a concept with similar performance to the coupe. It is the convertible variant of the K50 Coupe.

== Production ==
Roughly 1,000 units had been sold as of April, 2019. The Qiantu company has a factory in the city of Suzhou in Jiangsu Province with an annual capacity of 50,000 cars. The product mix of the factory located in Suzhou consists of the Qiantu K50 coupe, the K50 roadster launched in 2016, and two other electric vehicle products. In November 2020, Qiantu K50 disappeared from the market due to low sales.

== Features and specifications ==
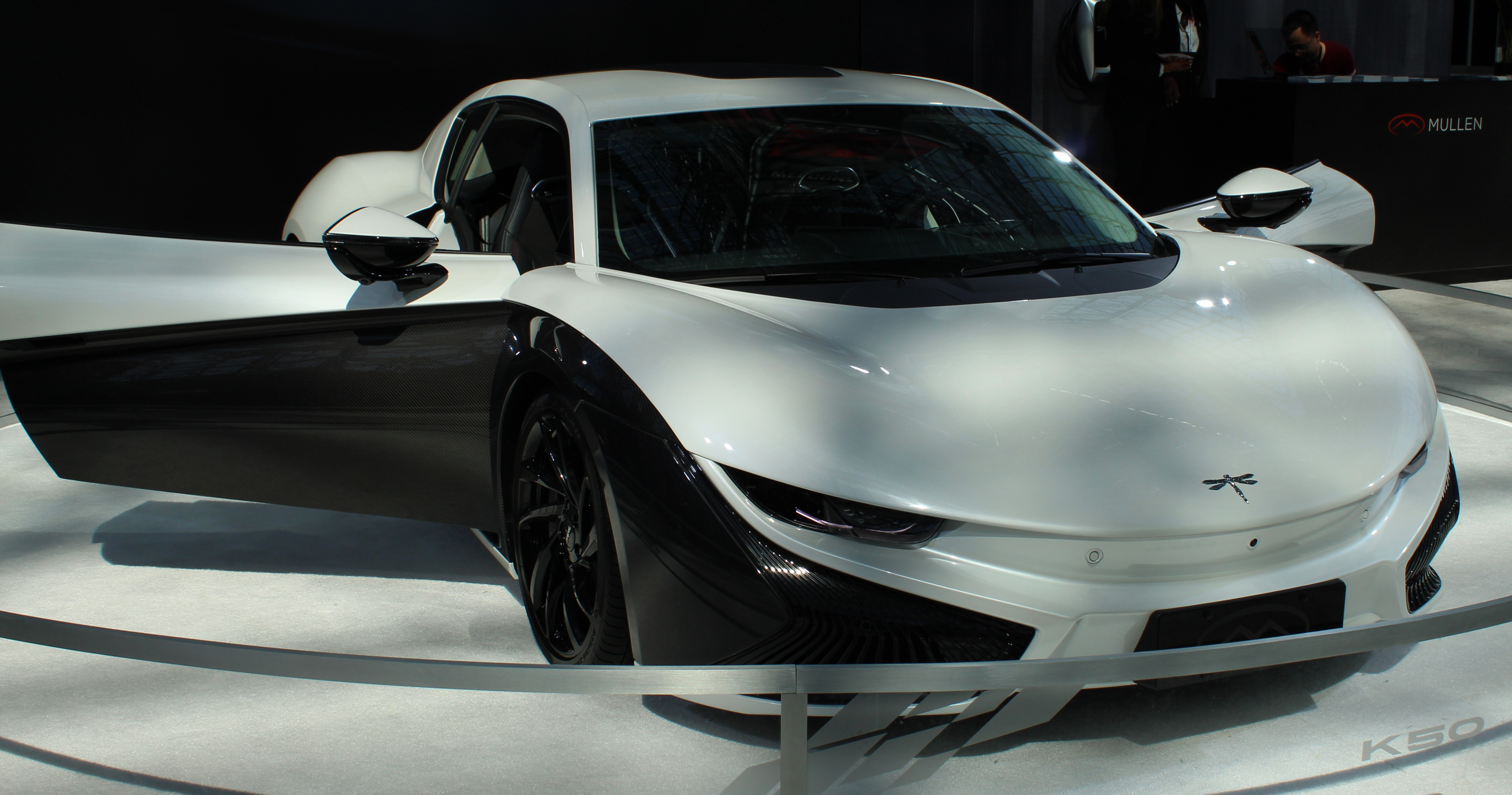
The Qiantu K50 at the 2019 New York International Auto Show

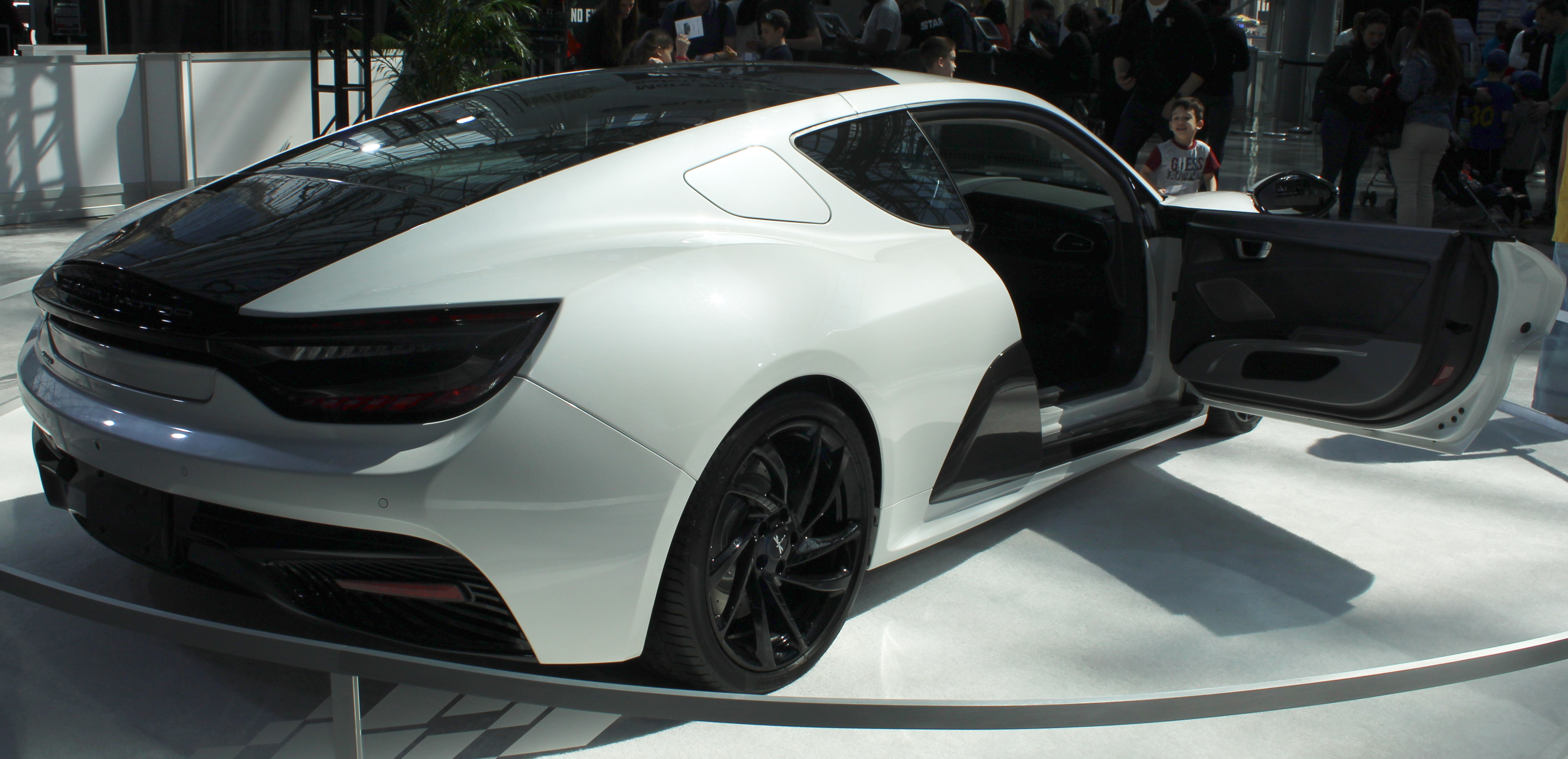
Rear view

The production Qiantu K50 has two motors with each motor producing 188 hp, making for a total of 376 hp and 580 Nm of torque. The acceleration of the production K50 is 4.6 seconds from 0 to 100 km/h, and a range of 365 kilometers confirmed by NEDC. prices of the production Qiantu K50 is 754,300 yuan as of March 2019.

== Performance and handling ==
The K50 has independent front and rear dual-arm suspensions. The front and rear counterweights are 47:53, and its four-wheel-drive mode adjusts the power distribution of the front and rear axles through electronic control programs. The NE50 of the Qiantu K50 has a range of 380 kilometres (240 mi) and supports fast charging, which can charge up to 80% of the battery in 45 minutes. The Qiantu K50 is 1.9 ton and has a 78.84kWh battery pack, and the overall power consumption is 20kWh / 100 km.

== Qiantu K50 Concept ==
The Qiantu K50 concept was powered by two electric motors, with one located on the front axle and one located on the rear axle producing a combined output of 428 hp and 650 nm, and a battery of 60 kWh. Claimed specifications of the Qiantu K50 includes a top speed of 200 kilometers per hour, 0–100 km/h in 4.6 seconds, and a range of 300 kilometers. The batteries of the K50 are 41.1kWh lithium-ion. The frame of the Qiantu K50 Concept was made of aluminum and the body was made of carbon fiber.
