= Mullen Automotive =

American electric car company

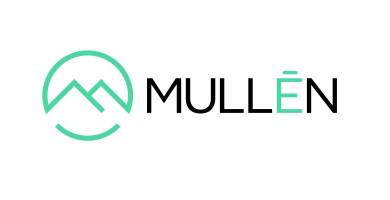
- Type: Public
- Traded as: Nasdaq: MULN
- ISIN: US62526P1093
- Industry: Automotive
- Founded: 2014; 12 years ago
- Founders: David Michery
- Headquarters: Brea, California, United States
- Area served: North America
- Key people: David Michery (chair & (president) & CEO); Jonathan New (CFO); Chester Bragado (CAO); John Schwegman (CCO); Mary Winter (secretary) & (director); Ignacio Novoa (director); Mark Betor (director); John Andersen (director); William Miltner (director); Kent Puckett (director)
- Products: Electric vehicles; batteries
- Services: Electric vehicle charging; vehicle insurance
- Revenue: $0
- Operating income: -US$740.32 million
- Net income: -US$740.32 million
- Total assets: US$302.59 million
- Total equity: US$156.95 million
- Number of employees: 118 (2023)
- Website: mullenusa.com

Bollinger Innovations, formerly Mullen Automotive, Inc., was an American automotive and electric vehicle manufacturer headquartered in Brea, California. The company marketed passenger and commercial electric vehicles, including the Mullen Go, Mullen One, and Mullen Three.

The company is primarily involved in rebadging Chinese captive imports such as the Mullen Campus, Mullen One, Mullen Three, Mullen Go, and Mullen GT lines. The company intended to field a luxury vehicle, the Mullen Five, then pivot to all-consumer electric vehicle models. For the 12 months period ending September 30th 2024, Mullen lost 506 million dollars on revenue of 1 million dollars, and at the end of the period the company had 10 million dollars in cash. The company was delisted from Nasdaq in October 2025 and soon after placed into receivership.

== History ==
The Mullen Automotive brand was created by David Michery by combining the companies Mullen Motor Cars with Coda Automotive. Michery planned for rapid expansion of the company, but as of 2023 the company hasn't released a single vehicle since its inception except for imported Chinese vehicles. Mullen originally intended to launch the Dragonfly K50 luxury sports car, now called the Mullen GT and GTRS, in the U.S. by 2021. However as of March 2023, the company is still finalizing engineering. The vehicle is based heavily on the Qiantu K50.

On June 15, 2020, Mullen Technologies announced a merger agreement with payments-as-a-service platform Net Element, Inc., which was completed in November 2021. This reverse merger resulted in Mullen becoming a subsidiary of Net Element, and Net Element changing its name to Mullen Automotive, Inc.

On March 17, 2021, Mullen Technologies announced that they would open a factory in Memphis, Tennessee for the manufacture of their Mullen FIVE crossover SUV, with plans to sell these models as early as 2024. However, in November 2021, Mullen purchased a facility in nearby Robinsonville, Mississippi instead, forgoing the Tennessee site.

In February 2022, an article by Fuzzy Panda Research presented Mullen acquisition and bankrupt commercial EV manufacturer Electric Last Mile Solutions (ELMS) as an "EV Pretender – Passing Off Chinese Imports as "Made in the USA"; Booking Fake Revenue of Fully Returnable Products". In April 2022, an article by Hindenburg Research presented Mullen as one of "the worst [electric vehicle] hustles" in recent history.

In September 2022 Mullen purchased a controlling stake in Bollinger Motors, a manufacturer of EV pick-ups and SUVs, for $148.2 million This valued pre-revenue Bollinger Motors at $247 Million. In June 2022, Bollinger had little more than a month left of cash to cover operating expenses. Bollinger Motors was insolvent and placed into receivership in 2025.

Mullen changed its name to Bollinger Innovations in June 2025. In November of 2025, the Bollinger Motors unit closed its doors, after being unable to meet payroll. The company has been placed in receivership in January 2026.

== Vehicles ==
=== Mullen Go ===
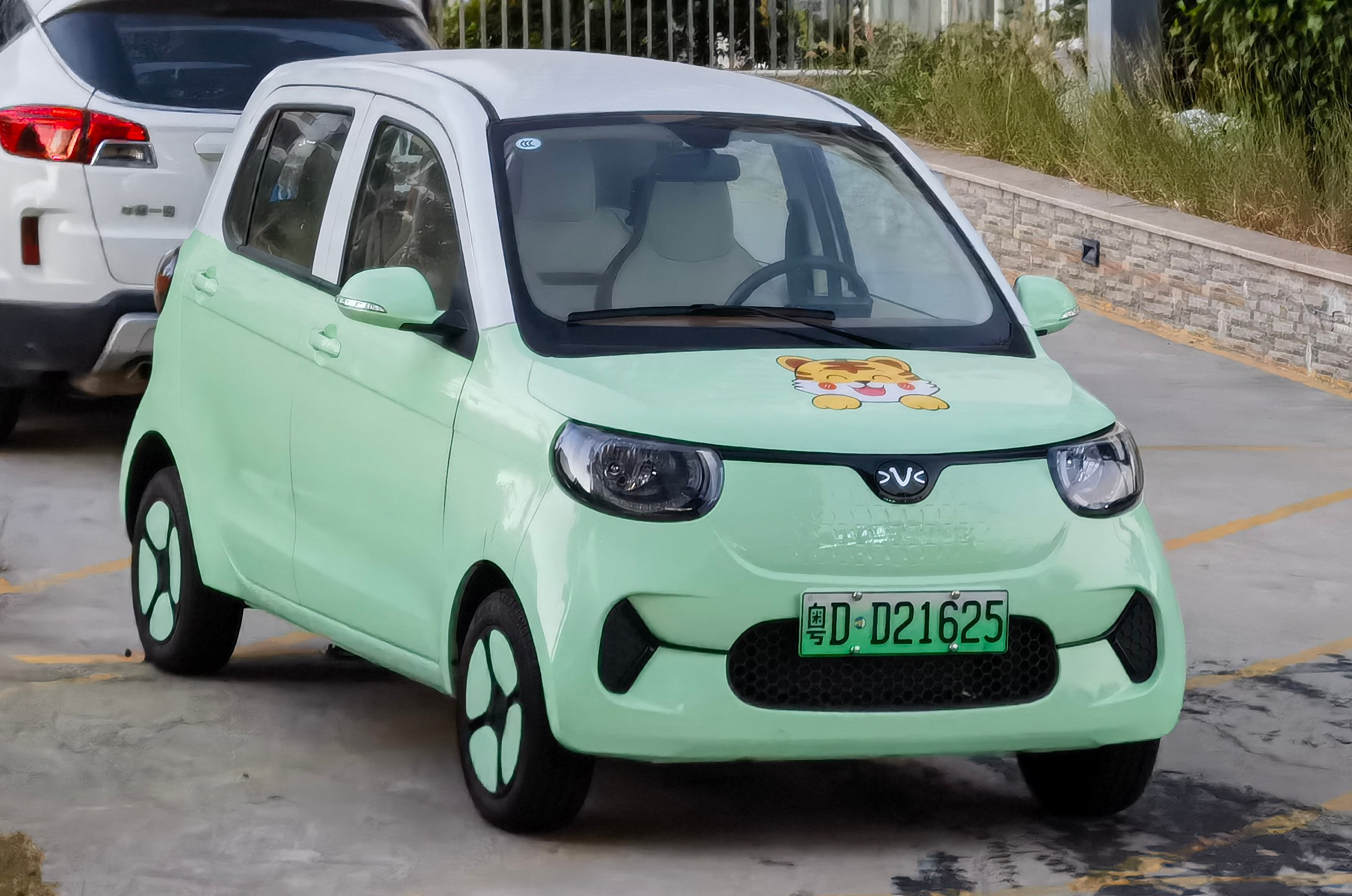
Xiaohu FEV, the vehicle Mullen Go was based on

The Mullen Go is an electric city car unveiled by Mullen Automotive in October 2022. Being essentially a rebadged Chinese Xiaohu FEV, the Go serves as a last mile delivery vehicle.

=== Mullen One ===
The Mullen One is a rebadged version of the Wuling Motors G100 van. An unhomologated version of the Wuling G100 van, titled Mullen Campus, is sold for use only on private property, without the safety improvements added to the Mullen One.

=== Mullen Three ===
The Mullen Three is a three-seat, cab-over class 3 last-mile delivery truck with a 60/120Kw (rated/peak) Jing-jin electric engine generating 150/320Nm of torque. It is manufactured by Yuejin, a subsidiary of SAIC Motor, a state-owned enterprise of China.

=== Mullen GT and GTRS ===
The Mullen GT and GTRS are rebadged kit versions of the Qiantu K50.

=== Mullen FIVE ===
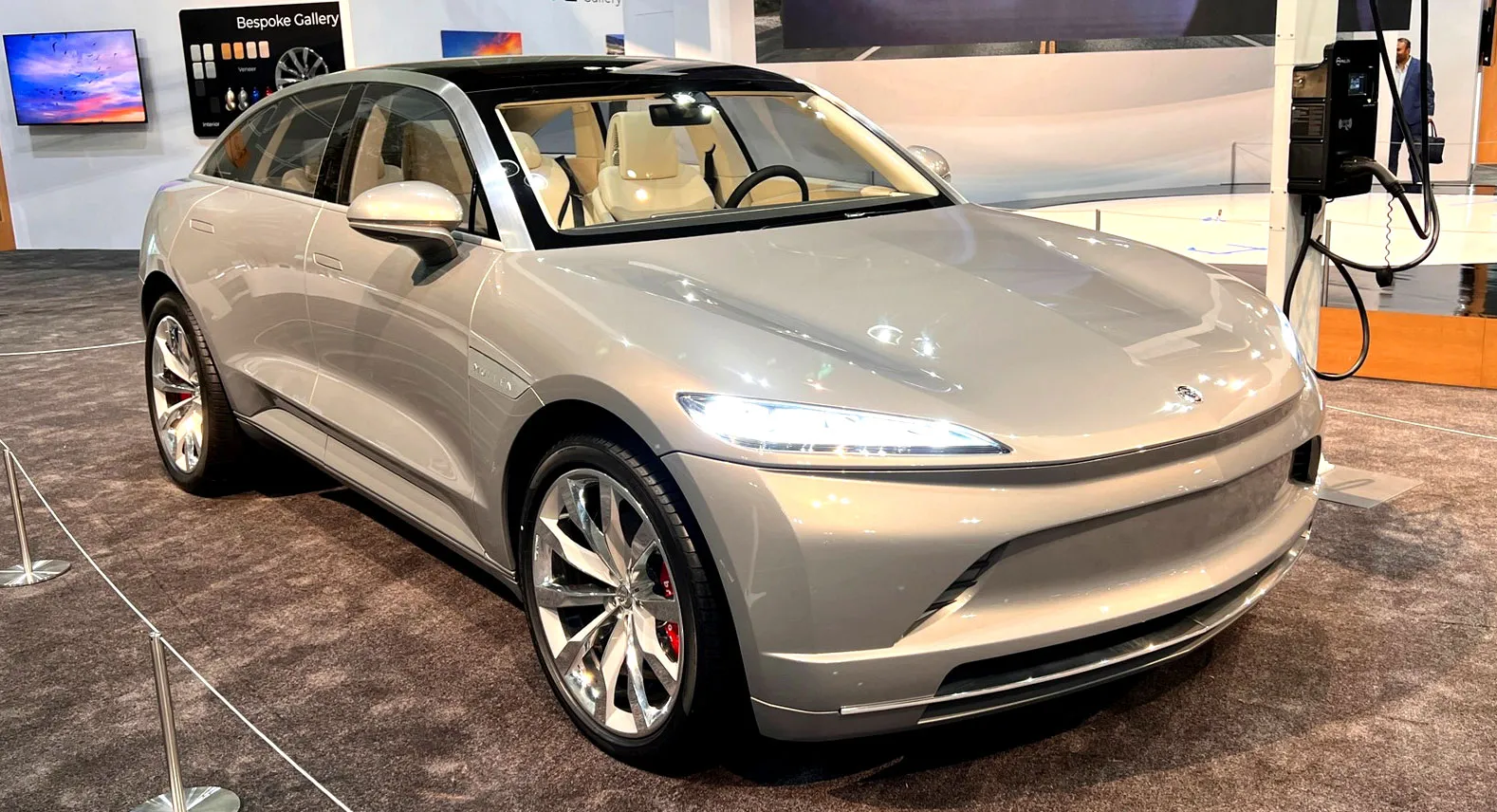
Mullen FIVE

The Mullen FIVE was a planned premium compact electric SUV. Development of the vehicle was cancelled in 2024.

=== Bollinger B4 ===
Mullen's acquired subsidiary Bollinger Motors has delivered several Bollinger B4 truck in 2024.

== Controversies ==
=== CEO compensation and awards ===
Despite Mullen Automotive Inc being unprofitable, Michery has continued with a base salary of US$750,000 per year and received a number of performance awards totalling over $40M as of September 2023. At Mullen's 2023 annual shareholder's meeting, Michery was granted further 2023 performance awards. On August 31, 2023, Michery, along with Wes Christian, appeared on Fox Business's Making Money show hosted by Charles Payne to discuss the Mullen "Naked Shorting" lawsuit filed against TD Ameritrade, Charles Schwab, and National Finance Services, in which Michery alleged illegal short selling of Mullen stock by the defendants. In the second half of the interview, Payne asked Michery about his compensation. Michery did not respond with an explanation before technical audio issues occurred. Charles Schwab has denied all of the charges.

In a press release the following day by Mullen, the company responded to the question of $31M in General and Administrative expenses for the company's third quarter but did not answer the question about the CEO's compensation.
