= MADEI =

MADEI has been assembling Japanese commercial vehicles in Myanmar for decades.

Recently, it was commissioned by the government to manufacture jeeps. Manufactured at six industrial zones under government supervision, the models are Super Mandala Jeep from Mandalay Industrial Zone, Myay Latt Jeep from Myingyan Industrial Zone, Htila Jeep from Meikhtila Industrial zone, Chindwin Star Jeep from Monywa Industrial Zone, Shan Star Jeep from Ayethaya Industrial Zone in Taunggyi and PKU Jeep from Pakokku Industrial Zone. The vehicles' bodies are made locally, while the mechanical parts are imported from Japan. Production rate was approximately 100 annually.
