= Karat (disambiguation) =

Karat is a fractional measure of purity for gold alloys.

Karat may also refer to:

== Aviation ==
- Karat (airline), a former Russian airline
- SDB Karat, a Russian ultralight trike design

== People ==
- Brinda Karat (born 1947), Indian politician and Member of Parliament
- Prakash Karat (born 1948), Indian politician and General Secretary of Communist Party of India (Marxist)
- KARAT, a KGB code word for former FBI agent and convicted spy Robert Hanssen (born 1944)

== Places ==
- Karat, Ethiopia, a town in South Ethiopia Regional State
- Karat, Iran, a list of places in Iran
  - Karat, Khuzestan, a village in Khuzestan Province, Iran
  - Karat, Razavi Khorasan, a village in Razavi Khorasan Province, Iran
    - Karat Rural District, an administrative subdivision of Razavi Khorasan Province, Iran

== Other ==
- Karat banana, a cultivar grown in Micronesia
- Karat, an early Agfa cartridge for 35 mm film
- Karat (band), a German band

== See also ==
- Carat (disambiguation)
- Kareth or Karet, a biblical punishment
- Karot Hydropower Project
- Caret (disambiguation)
- - Karata (disambiguation), Karatas (disambiguation), and Karataş (disambiguation)
  - Karatay (disambiguation)
  - Karate (disambiguation)
  - Karatepe (disambiguation)
  - Karatoula (disambiguation)
