= Karet =

Karet may refer to:

- Karet railway station, a former railway station in Kebon Melati, Jakarta, Indonesia
- Karet, Iran or Koreyt-e Borumi, a village in Mosharrahat Rural District
- Kareth, the punishment of being "cut off" in Judaism

== See also ==
- Carat (disambiguation)
- Caret (disambiguation)
- Carrot (disambiguation)
- Karet Bivak Cemetery, in Jakarta, Indonesia
- Djam Karet, a rock band in California
