= Caret (disambiguation) =

Caret may refer to:

- Caret, the free-standing ^ character used in computing.
- Caret (proofreading), the proofreader's insertion symbols ‸ ⁁ ⎀

== Other ==
- CARET Brain Mapping Software
- Caret (surname), people with the surname Caret
- Caret or insertion point, a blinking vertical bar indicating where typed text will be inserted when using a cursor (user interface)
- Caret navigation (or caret browsing), a blinking vertical bar in a text field
- CARET, the beta-Carotene and Retinol Efficacy Trial

== See also ==
- Philip L. Carret
- Carat (disambiguation)
- Carrot (disambiguation)
- Karat (disambiguation) (includes Karet)
