= Corot (disambiguation) =

Jean-Baptiste-Camille Corot (1796–1875) was a French landscape painter.

Corot may also refer to:

- CoRoT, a space mission with the dual aims of finding extrasolar planets and performing asteroseismology
- List of exoplanets discovered by CoRoT, a list of all exoplanets found by CoRoT
- Corot noir, a hybrid grape

== See also ==
- Carat (disambiguation)
