= Volkswagen Pointer =

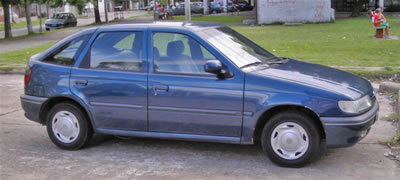

Overview
- Manufacturer: Volkswagen (Autolatina)
- Production: October 1993 – December 1996
- Model years: 1994–1996
- Assembly: Brazil: São Bernardo do Campo

Body and chassis
- Class: Small family car (C)
- Body style: 5-door hatchback
- Layout: FF layout
- Related: Ford Escort; Volkswagen Logus

Powertrain
- Engine: 1.8 L AP 1800; 2.0 AP 2000
- Transmission: 5-speed manual

Chronology
- Successor: Volkswagen Golf Mk3

The Volkswagen Pointer is a small family car sold by Autolatina in Argentina, Brazil and Uruguay from 1994 to 1996. The Pointer was available as a five-door hatchback, and the two-door Sedan version, called the Volkswagen Logus, was sold from 1993 to 1996.

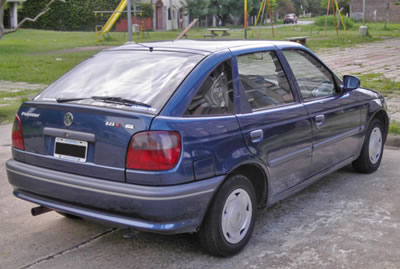
Volkswagen Pointer rear

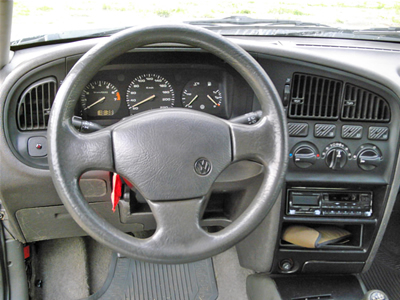
Interior

It was based on the European version of the Ford Escort, being the result of Volkswagen Group's AutoLatina joint venture with Ford Motor Company, which also saw the Volkswagen Santana rebadged as the Ford Versailles. Although there were sheet metal differences between the Pointer and the Escort, the styling cues were still noticeably those of Ford rather than Volkswagen.

The nameplate remained in use after the Escort-based model was retired from production, as the Brazilian-manufactured Volkswagen Gol was marketed as the Volkswagen Pointer in Mexico, and also in Russia, Ukraine and Egypt.

The Volkswagen Pointer five-door hatchback was developed on the same Ford Escort MkV platform as the Volkswagen Logus, being presented in October 1993 in October and offered in four versions: CLI 1.8, GLI 1.8, GLI 2.0 and GTI 2.0.

The last Pointer produced, a hatchback GTI model, was sent to Volkswagen's factory museum in Wolfsburg, Germany.

== Highlights ==
- 1994 Digital Multipoint Injection Ford EEC-IV on GTI improved performance, level of noise and fuel consumption.
- 1995 offered option of coloured bumpers.
- 1996 GTI had new wheels and interior upholstery.
- 1996 was also the last year of production, due to the Autolatina partnership falling apart.

== See also ==
- Volkswagen Logus
