= Karata =

Karata may refer to:

- Karata people, a people of the Caucasus in Dagestan, Russia
- Karata language, the Avar-Andic language spoken by the Karata people
- Karata (rural locality), a rural locality (a selo) in Akhvakhsky District of the Republic of Dagestan, Russia

== See also ==
- Karatas (disambiguation)
- Katara (disambiguation)
