= Ford Versailles =

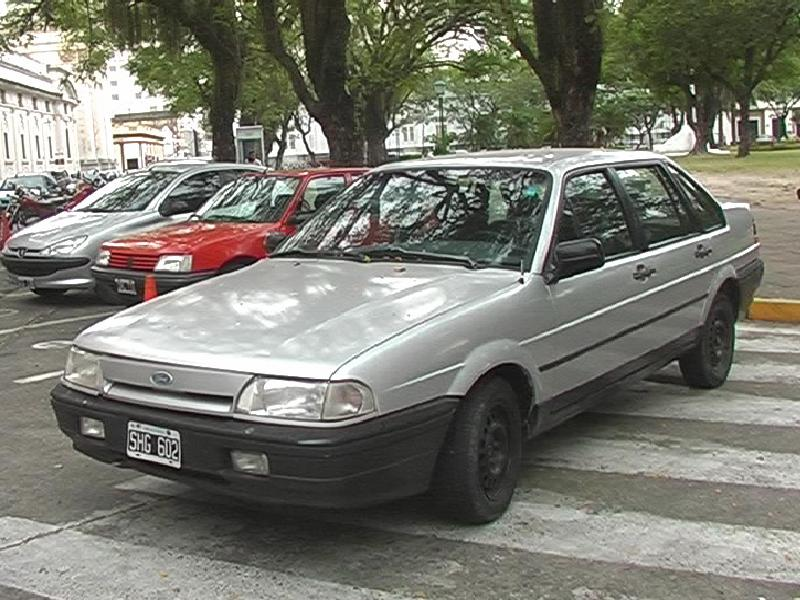
- Ford Galaxy (Argentina)

Overview
- Manufacturer: Autolatina
- Also called: Ford Galaxy (Argentina)
- Production: 1991–1996
- Assembly: Brazil: São Bernardo do Campo

Body and chassis
- Class: Mid-size car / Large family car (D)
- Body style: 2/4-door sedan 3/5-door station wagon (Ford Royale)
- Layout: FF layout
- Related: Volkswagen Santana

Powertrain
- Engine: 1.8 L I4; 2.0 L I4
- Transmission: 5-speed manual 3-speed automatic

Dimensions
- Wheelbase: 255 cm
- Length: 457 cm
- Width: 169 cm
- Height: 142 cm
- Curb weight: 1162 kg

Chronology
- Predecessor: Ford Del Rey
- Successor: Ford Mondeo I

The Ford Versailles is a large family car sold between 1991 and 1996 in Brazil and Argentina. It is a version of the Volkswagen Santana sold in the 1990s, when Ford and Volkswagen shared models in South America in a joint venture known as Autolatina. It replaced the Ford Del Rey in Brazil and the locally built Ford Sierra in Argentina. The station wagon version was sold as the Ford Royale.

== History ==
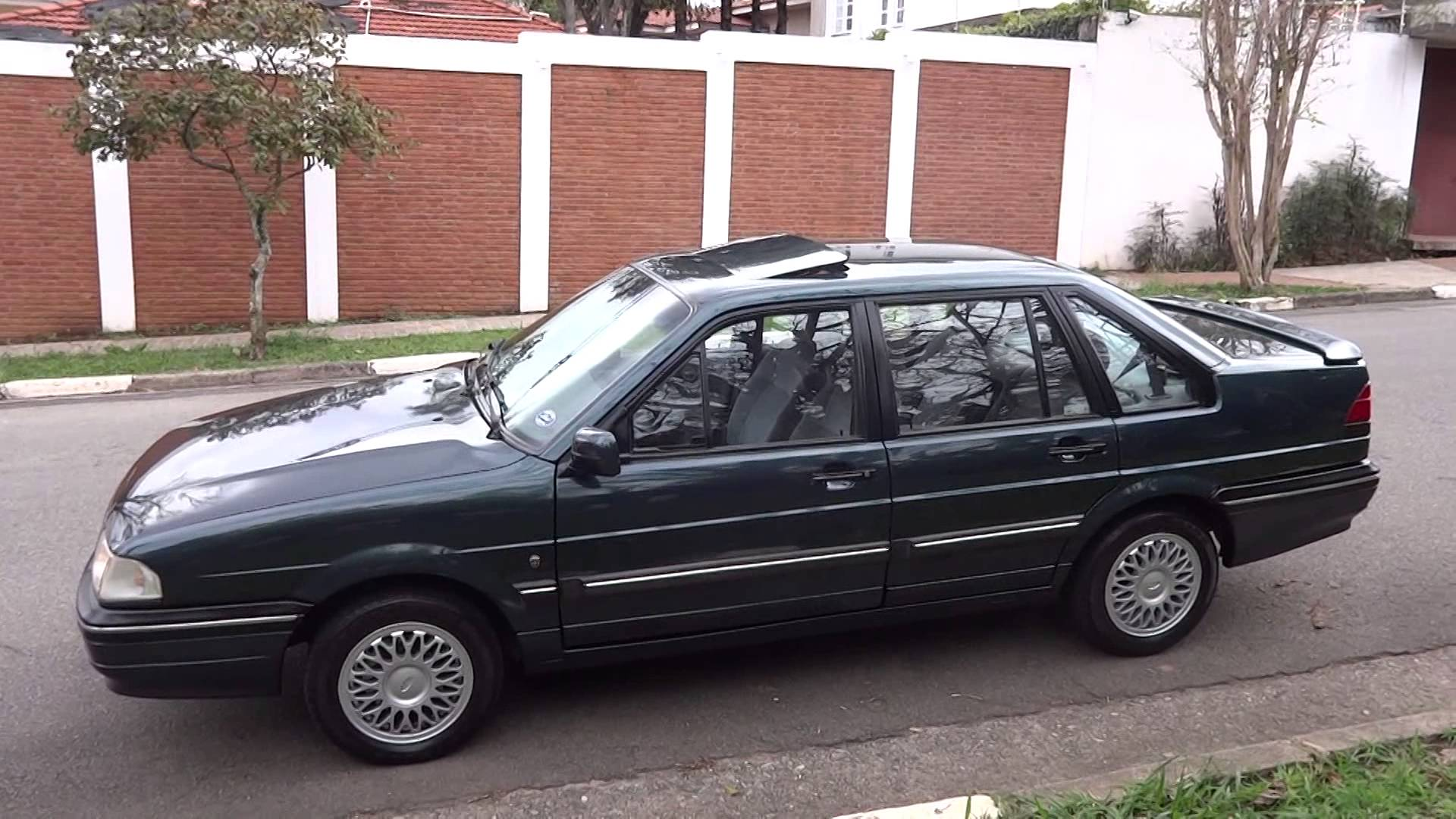
1996 Ford Versailles 2.0i Ghia; facelift model

The Ford Versailles took over from the Ford Del Rey in 1991 (for the 1992 model year). Design differed from the Santana by using Ford's corporate front end treatment, somewhat squarer taillights, and more upright D-pillars. Like the Santana, the Versailles was available as a two- or four-door sedan, and as a station wagon called the Ford Royale. The Royale was initially only offered as a three-door, even though the Volkswagen Quantum on which it was based was available with five doors. (It was alleged that Volkswagen did not want the Royale to be available as a five-door model, as this would have posed a competitive threat to the popular Quantum.). In 1995 and 1996, Ford did offer a five-door version of the Royale. The Versailles and Royale were both built at Volkswagen's plant in São Bernardo do Campo and not at Ford's own facility.

The GL came standard with a 1.8-liter Volkswagen engine, or an optional 2.0-liter version. Both were offered in either gasoline or alcohol-powered versions. The top Ghia model only received the 2.0-liter engine and was also available with electronic fuel injection. From 1993, fuel injection became available on the GL as well.

== Changes ==
In 1994, the model-specific front seats were replaced with the cheaper units from the locally built Ford Escort. In 1995, the Autolatina joint venture ended. Nonetheless, Ford presented a facelifted version of the Versailles and Royale, which coincided with the availability of a five-door station wagon.

== Ford Galaxy ==
The Versailles was also sold as the Ford Galaxy in Argentina (not to be confused with the European MPV of the same name), where it replaced the Ford Sierra. Both the Versailles and the Galaxy were eventually replaced by the Ford Mondeo.

== See also ==
- Lincoln Versailles, an upmarket version of the 1970s U.S. Ford Granada
- Volkswagen Apollo
- Volkswagen Pointer
