= Karatay =

Karatay or Karatai is a Turkic word that may refer to:

== Places ==
- Karatay, Konya, a town and district of Konya Province, Turkey
- Karatay, Russia, a rural locality (a village) in the Republic of Tatarstan, Russia
- Caratai, Karatay, historical name of Castelu, Romania, from the times of the Ottoman Empire

== People ==
- Qaratays, a Turkic (Tatar) ethnic group that lives near Karatay, Russia
- Canan Karatay (born 1943), Turkish professor, medical doctor
- Dursun Karatay (born 1984), Austrian footballer
- Nefise Karatay (born 1976), Turkish actress
- Karatai, birth surname of Maksim Łužanin, Belarusian writer and poet
