= AutoLatina =

Joint venture between VW and Ford in Brazil

- Company type: Private
- Industry: Automotive
- Founded: 1987
- Defunct: 1995; 31 years ago
- Headquarters: General Pacheco; São Bernardo do Campo
- Number of locations: Argentina; Brazil
- Parent: Volkswagen do Brasil (51%); Ford Brasil (49%)

AutoLatina was a joint venture between Volkswagen Group subsidiary Volkswagen do Brasil (51%) and Ford Motor Company subsidiary Ford Brasil (49%) in South America. The main reason for the joint venture was the bad economic situation at the time, which made joint survival more attractive than an individual fight for a share in a dwindling market.

Four divisions - Ford of Argentina, Ford Brasil (Ford of Brasil), Volkswagen Argentina, and Volkswagen do Brasil - formed AutoLatina in July 1987.

Volkswagen managed the car division, and Ford the truck division.

This resulted in the two companies sharing badge engineered models. These included:

- Ford Verona / Volkswagen Apollo
- Ford Escort Mk V / Volkswagen Pointer
- Ford Orion / Volkswagen Logus
- Volkswagen Santana / Ford Galaxy/Versailles
- Volkswagen Quantum / Ford Royale

A clay model of a small Ford 3-door hatchback derived from the Volkswagen Gol was made, as well as sketches of 5-door, panel van and XR2 versions. Stylists found difficulty styling around the unusual proportions caused by engine packaging, causing dissatisfaction with Ford's management towards the platform restrictions. Models using Volkswagen's B5 platform were also considered, such a SUV-like "RSV" model, an MPV model and derived pickup, and a Ford sedan and wagon. Sketches were also produced of Fusca "Icon" concepts (such as buggys and hot rods), a new-generation Gol 3, and cabriolet and pickup variants of the Logus. A facelifted Logus was cancelled due to the collapse of the venture.

The AutoLatina venture was dissolved in December 1995. The market share of Ford had eroded since the merger, due to its lack of small models markets when the market was shifting to more economic vehicles. For its part, Volkswagen maintained its leadership in Brazil thanks to the Volkswagen Gol and gained market share in Argentina (from 10% in 1987 to 18.6% in 1996). Market liberalization also made it unnecessary to have separate development lines for Latin America, and both manufacturers wanted to incorporate theirs into the global brand lineups. The companies thus resumed their separate activities, regaining whatever physical assets they had before the merger.

== Truck Division ==
Volkswagen Commercial Vehicles and Ford Trucks were built alongside each other in the Ipiranga complex, both shared parts and platforms. Ford kept manufacturing trucks for Volkswagen for a while after the break-up, although they proceeded to develop their own truck manufacturing capacity.

The Truck Division also exported trucks to the Paccar Group in the United States, where they were sold with Kenworth and Peterbilt badging.
