= Karaite =

Karaite or Qaraite may refer to:

- Karaite Judaism, a Jewish religious movement that rejects the Talmud
  - Crimean Karaites, an ethnic group derived from Turkic-speaking adherents of Karaite Judaism in Eastern Europe
    - Karaim language, a Turkic language of Crimean Karaites. It is often considered an ethnolect or divergent dialect group of the Crimean Tatar language.
  - Constantinopolitan Karaites, an ethnic group derived from Grecophone adherents of Karaite Judaism in and around Constantinople (now Istanbul)
    - Yevanic language or Karaeo-Greek, a Hellenic language of the Constantinopolitan Karaites. It is considered an ethnolect of Koine Greek.

== See also ==
- Karate (disambiguation)
- Keraites, a Turco-Mongolian tribe
