= Volkswagen Logus =

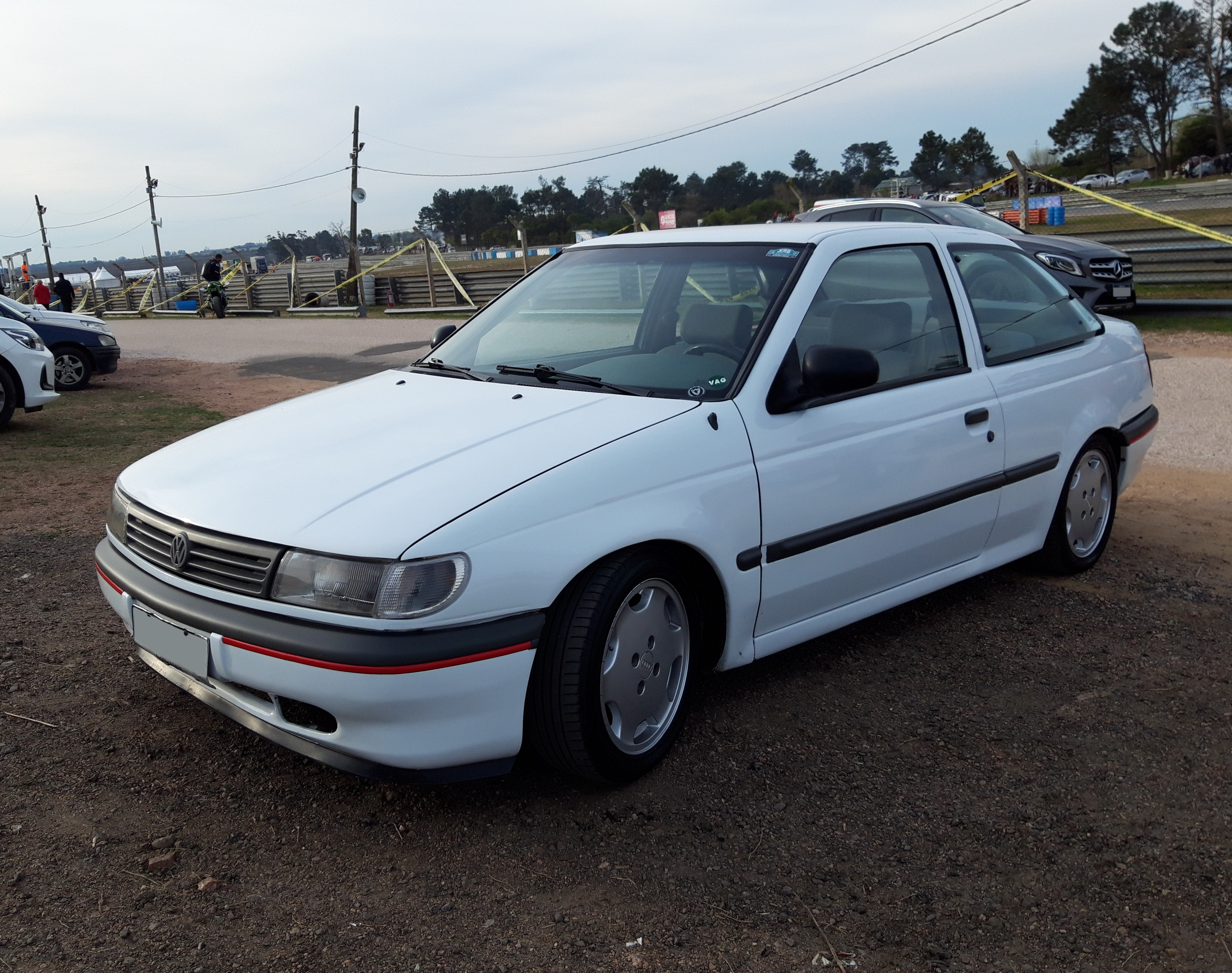

Overview
- Manufacturer: Volkswagen (Autolatina)
- Production: March 1993 – January 1997
- Assembly: Brazil: São Bernardo do Campo
- Designer: Ghia

Body and chassis
- Class: Small family car (C)
- Body style: 2-door sedan
- Layout: FF layout
- Related: Ford Escort Mk.V; Volkswagen Pointer

Powertrain
- Engine: 1.6 L AE 1600; 1.8 L AP 1800
- Transmission: 5-speed manual

Chronology
- Successor: Volkswagen Polo Classic

The Volkswagen Logus is a rebadged Ford Escort MkV which was launched by Volkswagen in a two-door coupé configuration in March 1993, as part of the Ford Motor Company and Volkswagen do Brasil joint venture in South America called AutoLatina. The Logus was designed in the Ghia Studios in Italy under the stewardship of Luiz Alberto Veiga from Volkswagen do Brasil.

The Logus was launched in March 1993 with four versions: CL 1.6, CL 1.8, GL 1.8 and GLS 1.8. All engines versions were available to use ethanol or gasoline (so in fact there were eight versions). It was assembled in São Bernardo do Campo, Brazil, alongside its rebadged cousin, the Ford Escort MkV.

A facelift was planned, as well as potential cabriolet and pickup variants, but was cancelled with the dissolution of AutoLatina.

== Highlights ==
- The Logus had an aerodynamic rating of Cd 0.33.
- 1.8-litre engines had an electronic carburetor.
- In 1994, the GLS engine was upgraded to a 2.0-litre engine.
- In 1996, the Wolfsburg Edition was released.
- The final production year was 1997, as the AutoLatina partnership had been dissolved.
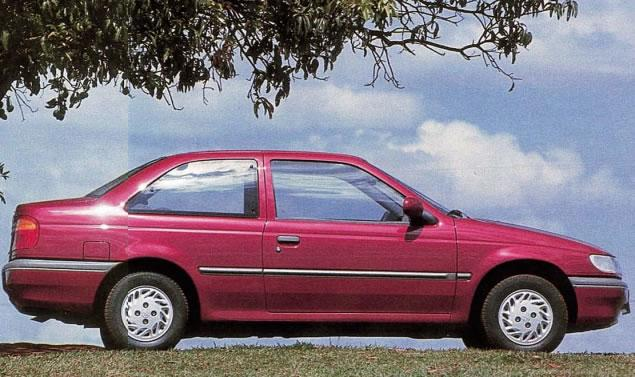
Side view

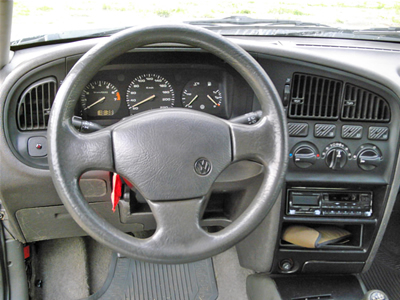
Interior

== See also ==
- Volkswagen Pointer
