= Katara =

Katara may refer to:

- Katara (Avatar: The Last Airbender), a character in the television series Avatar: The Last Airbender
- Katara Cultural Village, a cultural and commercial complex in Doha, Qatar
- Katara Pass, a mountain pass in northern Greece
- Katara (sauce), a spicy sauce made from chili peppers and Bachacho - Atta laevigata
- The katara (kaṭara, from Prakrit kaṭṭārī; also called katar or kuttar (from Hindi कटार (kaṭār))), a type of Indian push dagger with a distinctive cross-hatched handle.
