= Karat, Iran =

Karat (Persian: كرات or كرت) may refer to:

- Karat, Khuzestan (كرت - Karat)
- Karat, Razavi Khorasan (كرات - Karāt)
- Karat Rural District, in Razavi Khorasan Province
