= Katara (sauce) =

Spicy sauce

Katara is a spicy sauce typically made in the Venezuelan Amazon. It is made by the indigenous peoples of the area with chili peppers and fermented bachaco ants (Atta laevigata) bottom. Katara tastes both sour and spicy.
