= Karatas =

Karatas may refer to:

- Karataş (disambiguation)
- Karata people, an indigenous people of the Caucasus
- a generic synonym of the plant genus Bromelia
