= Karataş (disambiguation) =

Karataş is a town and district of Adana Province, on the Mediterranean coast of Turkey.

Karataş may also refer to:

== Surname ==
- Alican Karataş (born 1991), Turkish curler
- Dursun Karataş (1952–2008), Turkish communist
- Eda Karataş (born 1995), Turkish football player
- Haydar Karataş (born 2007), Turkish footballer
- Öztürk Karataş (born 1991), Turkish football player
- Şaban Karataş (1928–2016), Turkish academic and politician
- Tuğba Karataş (born 1992), Turkish football player

== Places ==
- Karataş, Bayramören, a village in Bayramören district of Çankırı Province, Turkey
- Karataş, Çayırlı, a village in Çayırlı district of Erzincan Province, Turkey
- Karataş, Çermik, a village in Çermik district of Diyarbakır Province, Turkey
- Karataş, Çubuk, a village in Çubuk district of Ankara Province, Turkey
- Karataş, Dinar, a village in Dinar district of Afyonkarahisar Province, Turkey
- Karataş, Döşemealtı, a village in Döşemealtı district of Antalya Province, Turkey
- Karataş, Elâzığ, a village in the central district of Elazığ Province, Turkey
- Karataş, Korkuteli, a village in Korkuteli district of Antalya Province, Turkey
- Karataş, Serik, a village in Serik district of Antalya Province, Turkey
- Karataş, Izmir, neighborhood of İzmir, Turkey
- Karataş, Karataş, a village in Karataş district of Adana Province, Turkey
- Karataş, Mudurnu, a village in Mudurnu district of Bolu Province, Turkey
- Karataş, Oltu, a village in Oltu district of Erzurum Province, Turkey
- Karataş, Palu, a village in Palu district of Elazığ Province, Turkey
- Karataş, Pazaryolu, a village in Pazaryolu district of Erzurum Province, Turkey
- Karataş Islets, two islets of Turkey in the Mediterranean Sea
- Karataş Şahinbey Sport Hall, an indoor multi-purpose sport venue in Gaziantep, Turkey
- Karataş, Sarayköy, a village in Sarayköy district of Denizli Province, Turkey

== See also ==
- Karata people, an indigenous people of the Caucasus
