= Carat =

Carat may refer to:

- Carat (mass), a unit of mass for gemstones and pearls
- Carat, or Karat, a fractional measure of purity for gold alloys
- Cooperation Afloat Readiness and Training, a naval exercise
- Volkswagen Carat, a car model
- AMS-Flight Carat, a motorglider design
- Eight Carat, British-bred Thoroughbred racehorse

== Entertainment, arts, and media ==
- Carat (board game)
- Puchi Carat, 1997 video game
- Carat, the fan club of South Korean boy band Seventeen
- "Carat", a 2007 music single by Sifow
- Gorgeous Carat, yaoi manga series
- 25 Carat, 2008 Spanish horror film
- Carat (Centrale d'Achats Radio, Affichage, Télévision), now the Dentsu International communications company

== See also ==
- Karat (disambiguation)
- Caret (disambiguation)
- Carrot, a vegetable
- Kareth, a form of punishment by exile
