= Caret (surname) =

Caret is a surname. Notable people with the surname include:

- François Caret (1802–1844), French Catholic priest
- Leanne Caret (born 1966), American businesswoman
- Robert Caret (born 1947), former chancellor of the University of Maryland
