= Ford Royale =

Body and chassis
- Class: Mid-size car / Large family car (D)
- Body style: 3/5-door station wagon

Powertrain
- Engine: 1.8 L I4; 2.0 L I4

The Ford Royale is an automobile which was produced in Brazil by Autolatina, a joint venture between Ford and Volkswagen, in the 1990s. It was a wagon version of the Ford Versailles sedan.

The Royale was available as a 3-door station wagon and as a 5-door station wagon. 1.8 litre and 2.0 litre four cylinder engines were offered. The Royale and the related Ford Versailles sedan were essentially rebadged Volkswagen Quantums.
