= Karatoula =

Karatoula or Karatoulas may refer to the following places in Greece:

- Karatoulas, a village in the municipality Megalopoli, Arcadia
- Karatoulas Kynourias, a village in the municipality North Kynouria, Arcadia
- Karatoula, Elis, a village in the municipal unit Oleni, Elis
- Karatoula (mountain), a mountain in Gortynia in western Arcadia
