= Karate (disambiguation) =

Karate is a martial art of Okinawan origin.

Karate may also refer to:

== Music ==
- Karate (band), an American indie rock band
- "Karate" (song), a 2016 album by Babymetal
- Karate, a 2018 album by Fitness
- Karate, a 2015 EP by Anne-Marie
- "Karate", a song by Tenacious D from their 2001 album Tenacious D
- Karate, a 2014 song by R3hab and KSHMR

== Other ==
- Karate (1982 video game), a 1982 video game for the Atari 2600
- Karate (film), a 1983 Indian film directed by Deb Mukherjee
- Karate, the sidekick of the eponymous superhero in the animated TV series Batfink
- Karate, a brand name for the insecticide cyhalothrin
- Karate Champ, a 1984 video game originally released as Karate
- Karate Mani (1944–1993), Indian karateka and film actor
- Karate Kalyani, Indian karateka and film actress

== See also ==
- Karaite (disambiguation)
- Karate Master, a manga series written by Ikki Kajiwara and illustrated by Jirō Tsunoda and Jōya Kagemaru
- Karateka (video game), a 1984 video game for the Apple II
- Shankar Nag (1954–1990), Indian actor nicknamed the "Karate King"
