= Philip L. Carret =

American investor

- Born: Philip Lord Carret; November 29, 1896; Lynn, Massachusetts, U.S.
- Died: May 28, 1998 (aged 101); Mount Vernon, New York, U.S.
- Education: Harvard College (B.S.)
- Occupation: Investor
- Spouse: Florence Elisabeth Osgood (m. 1922–1986; her death)

Philip Lord Carret (November 29, 1896 – May 28, 1998) was an investor and founder (in 1928) of Pioneer Fund (then: Fidelity Mutual Trust), one of the first mutual funds in the United States (now 3rd which exists still).

== Biography ==
A former Barron's reporter and World War I aviator Philip Carret launched the Mutual Trust in 1928 after managing money for his friends and family. The initial effort evolved into Pioneer Investments. He ran the fund (in the meantime name was changed to Pioneer Fund) for 55 years, during which an investment of $10,000 became $8 million. Warren Buffett said of him that he had "the best long term investment record of anyone I know." He is most famous for the long successful track record he achieved investing in common stocks and for being one of Warren Buffett's role models. He was an avid chaser of eclipses and had traveled around the world to view them.

== Bibliography ==
- Carret, Philip L. (1996). Buying a Bond. Fraser Publishing Company. ISBN 978-0870341243.
- Carret, Philip L. (2012). The Art of Speculation. Martino Fine Books. ISBN 978-1614272380.
- Carret, Philip L.; Hanley, Richard (1991). A Money Mind at Ninety. Fraser Publishing Company. ISBN 978-0870341014.
