= Nefise Karatay =

Turkish television personality, presenter, actress, model and beauty pageant winner

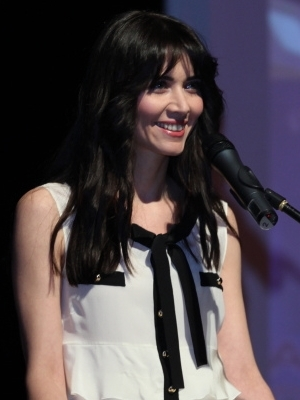
- Karatay in 2012
- Born: 26 April 1976 (age 49); Hesse, Germany
- Citizenship: Turkey
- Occupation(s): Actress, model, presenter
- Years active: 1994–present
- Spouse: Yusuf Day (m. 2012)
- Children: 1

Nefise Karatay (born 26 April 1976) is a Turkish television personality, presenter, actress, former top model and beauty pageant winner. She is known for being an anchor on CNN Türk.

== Biography ==
Nefise Karatay was born and lived the first years of her life in Hesse, Germany, as the daughter of parents from Turkey. She was one of the highest-paid models of Turkey in the late 1990s and early 2000s.

== Career ==
In 1997, Karatay competed in and won the Interstar Miss Turkey beauty pageant. She portrayed Ahu Toros, the main female protagonist in the TV series Valley of the Wolves: Ambush.

== Personal life ==
Karatay married businessman Yusuf Day on 16 July 2012 at Esma Sultan Mansion. In August 2015, she gave birth to her daughter, Maya Day.

== Filmography ==
Film
Year	Title	Role	Notes
2001	İkinci Şans		Television film
2007	O Kadın		
2008	Para=Dolar	Yasemin	
2011	Kara Murat: Mora'nın Ateşi		

Television
Year	Title	Role	Notes
1995	Mirasyediler		
1997	Eltiler	Yaprak	
1997	Number One	Host	TV show
2001	Yeni Hayat	Yasemin	
2001	Avcı	Suzan Nober	
2002	Beşik Kertmesi		
2002	Kurşun Asker		
2004	Uy Başıma Gelenler	Zeynep	
2005	Üç Kadın	Naz	
2005	Çılgın Yuva	Azra	
2006	Meçhule Gidenler		
2007	Valley of the Wolves: Ambush	Ahu Toros	Main cast
2009–2016	Afiş	Host	Talk show
2020	Bir Annenin Günahı	Nazan	
