= Karataş Islets =

Island in Turkey

Native name: Karataş Adaları
- Location within Turkey

Geography
- Location: Mediterranean Sea
- Coordinates: 36°33′N 35°23′E

Administration
- Turkey
- İl (province): Adana Province
- İlçe: Karataş

Karataş Islets are two Mediterranean islets in Turkey.

The islands face Karataş ilçe (district) of Adana Province at 36°33′23″N 35°23′21″E and 36°33′27″N 35°23′44″E. Their distance to Karataş is less than 1 kilometre (0.62 mi). The area of the western islet is about 5,000 square metres (54,000 sq ft) and the area of the eastern islet is about 7,000 square metres (75,000 sq ft).

According to the municipality of Karataş these two islets were named "Didimae" in the antiquity. Currently, the islands are uninhabited but the ruins around the islets show that the islets were inhabited in the antiquity. According to the researcher İsa Besiç, during the construction of some 19th-century buildings in the mainland (Anatolia) construction material from the islets were used.
