= Volkswagen Santana =

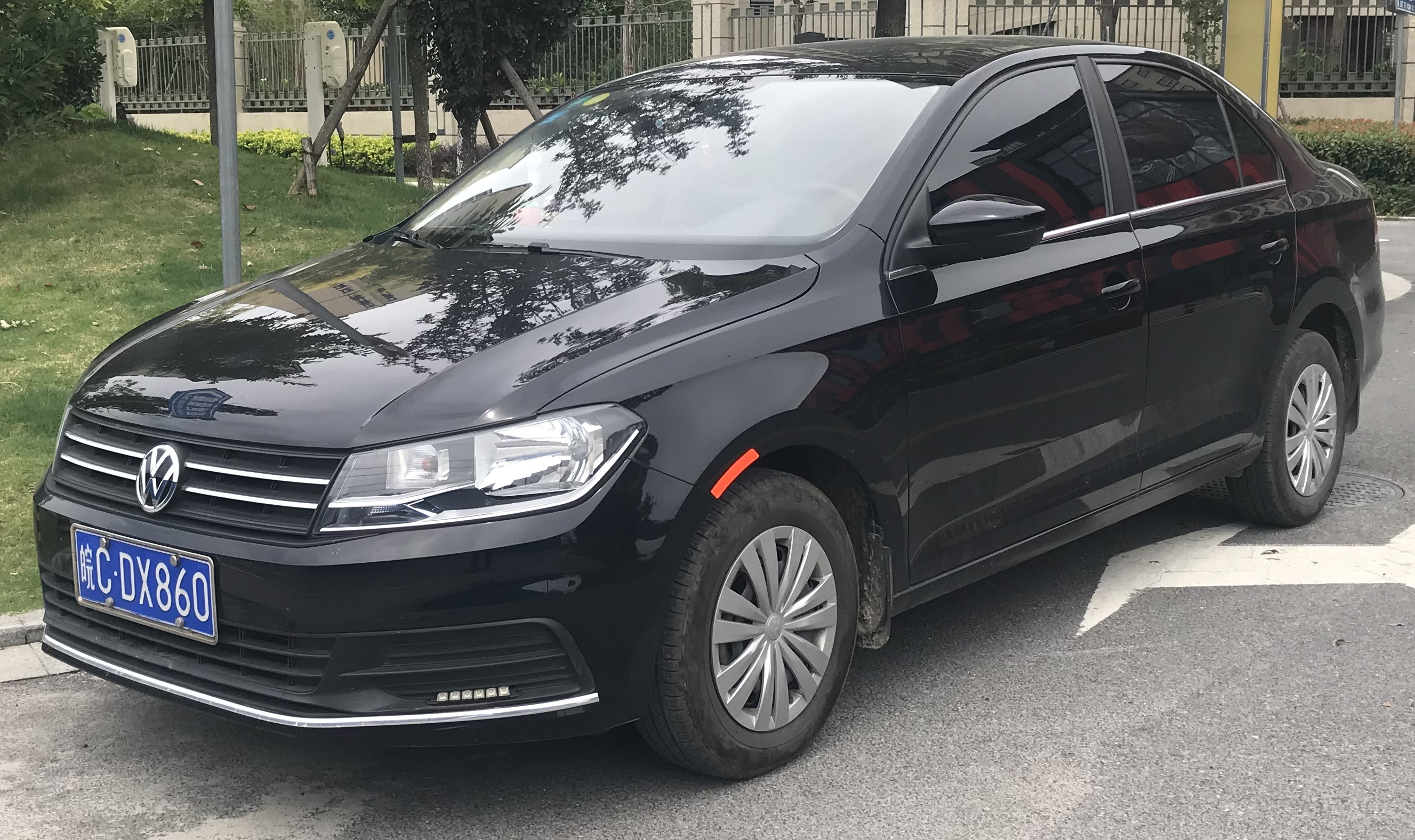
- A Santana II in China.

Overview
- Manufacturer: Volkswagen
- Also called: Volkswagen Quantum; Volkswagen Corsar; Volkswagen Carat; Volkswagen Passat; Ford Versailles
- Production: 1983–2022 (China); 1981–1984 (Europe); 1984–1989 (Japan); 1984–2006 (Brazil)
- Model years: 1983–2022

Body and chassis
- Layout: Front-engine, front-wheel-drive

Chronology
- Predecessor: Shanghai SH760 (China)

The Volkswagen Santana is a nameplate used by Volkswagen for various saloons and estates from 1983 to 2022. The first generation is based on the second-generation Volkswagen Passat (B2). It was introduced in 1981 while production started in 1983 for China. The use of the "Santana" badge rather than "Passat" echoes the use of different names for the sedan versions of the Polo (Derby) and Golf (Jetta).

In North America, it was also known as the Volkswagen Quantum. In Mexico, it was named the Volkswagen Corsar, while in Argentina it was sold as the Volkswagen Carat. In Brazil and other South American countries it was known as the Santana, while the Passat Variant B2 wagon was marketed as the Quantum. In Europe, the Santana name was dropped in 1985 (with the exception of Spain, where the Santana nameplate was retained) and the car was sold as a Passat. European test production ended in 1988 while Latin American production continued until 2006. Chinese production of the three box sedan continued until January 2013.

The final Chinese versions were named Santana Vista, and the name Santana was used on a new 2013 model, slightly smaller and based on the Škoda Rapid and SEAT Toledo.

== Santana (Europe; 1981–1984) ==
Volkswagen Santana
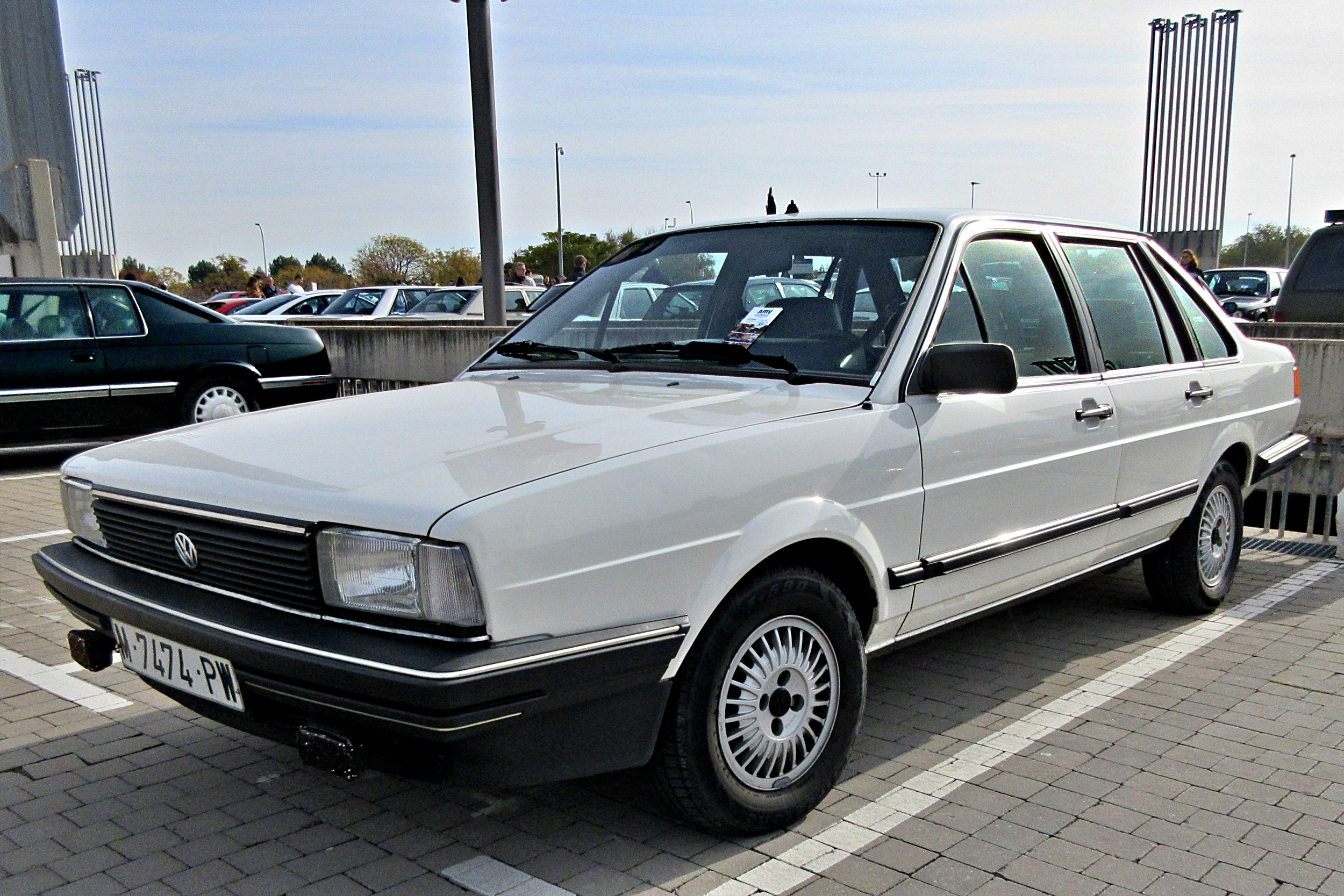
- Volkswagen Santana GX-5

Overview
- Manufacturer: Volkswagen
- Production: 1981–1984
- Assembly: Germany: Emden; Belgium: Brussels

Body and chassis
- Class: Mid-size car
- Body style: 4-door saloon
- Platform: Volkswagen Group B2 platform
- Related: Audi 80 B2; Volkswagen Passat (B2)

Powertrain
- Engine: petrol: 1272 cc FY/FZ I4; 1296 cc EP I4; 1588 cc WV/YP I4; 1595 cc JU/DT I4; 1781 cc DS/JN/JV I4; 1921 cc WN I5; 1994 cc JS/HP I5; diesel: 1588 cc CR/JK I4; 1588 cc CY turbo I4
- Transmission: 4/5-speed manual 3-speed automatic

Dimensions
- Wheelbase: 2,550 mm (100.4 in)
- Length: 4,545 mm (178.9 in)
- Width: 1,695 mm (66.7 in)
- Height: 1,400 mm (55.1 in)

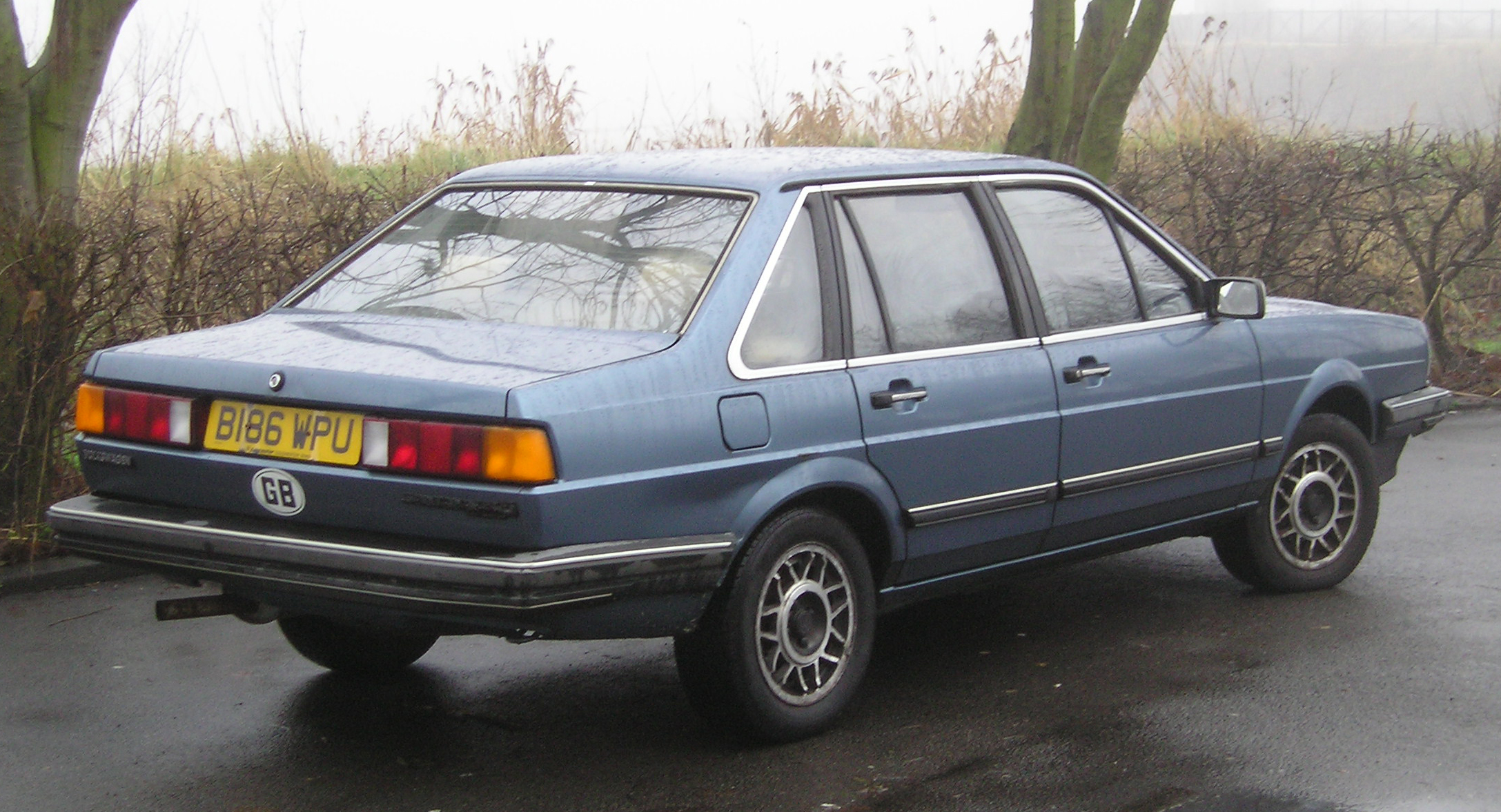
Rear view

The Volkswagen Santana was originally sold in Europe as a four-door sedan based on the Volkswagen Passat B2 from 1981 to 1984. In Europe the Santana was marketed towards the upper middle class. It was only available as a four-door sedan, although Volkswagen did build five two-door, pre-series sedans in 1981.

The name "Santana" was derived from the Santa Ana winds. The Santana was also technically identical to the Passat while being positioned more upmarket, consisting of higher quality equipment and better interior materials. Distinguishing features from the Passat included a unique radiator grille with white indicator lenses right next to the headlight and more chrome decoration.

Volkswagen wanted to position the Santana higher than the Passat, but it was also cautious of the fact that it could possibly cannibalize sales of the Audi 80 B2. The Santana faced competition in its home market from the likes of the upmarket Audi 80, BMW 3 Series, Mercedes-Benz 190 while also competing with mainstream competitors such as the Opel Ascona. The Audi 80 and the VW Santana were marketed through a joint sales channel, and as a result sales remained below Volkswagen's expectations.

From January 1985, the Santana name was dropped in Europe except in Spain, but the car continued to be kept on sale through a facelift and was henceforth known as the Passat notchback until the Passat B2's discontinuation in 1988.

In the first year of sales, The Santana was only offered in the higher-quality CL and GL versions. To emphasize the model's independence, these were changed to LX and GX from August 1982 onwards and from 1984 a more basic CX version was also introduced. The GX5 was the top of the range and came with alloy wheels, leather upholstery, deep pile carpet and central locking as standard as well as a sporty 1.9 inline five engine from the Audi Coupe. This engine was upgraded to a 2.0 litre in the last year of production (1984).

The range of engines on the Santana was similar to the Passat, 1.3 petrol, 1.6 petrol, 1.8 petrol which were all inline-four with a top of the range 1.9-litre petrol straight-five which was upgraded to a 2.0-litre unit in 1984. Diesels were also offered in Europe, a naturally aspirated diesel producing 54 horsepower and a turbocharged diesel producing 70 horsepower. Both diesels have a capacity of 1.6 litres.

Due to rising fuel prices, Volkswagen began introducing the Formel E models in the early 1980s. These models featured minor aerodynamic improvements and had longer gear ratios. A Formel E feature only found in the Passat and the Santana was a start-stop system which allowed the driver to push a button to switch off the engine. The engine was then started automatically when first gear was engaged. From September 1984 catalytic converters were also introduced on the Santana and on request, lambda control could also be ordered on fuel injected petrol engines.

In total, 198,505 examples were produced in Europe, with 174,900 petrol examples and 23,600 diesel examples made.

== Santana (China; 1983–2022) ==
=== First generation (B2; 1983) ===
Volkswagen Santana (B2)
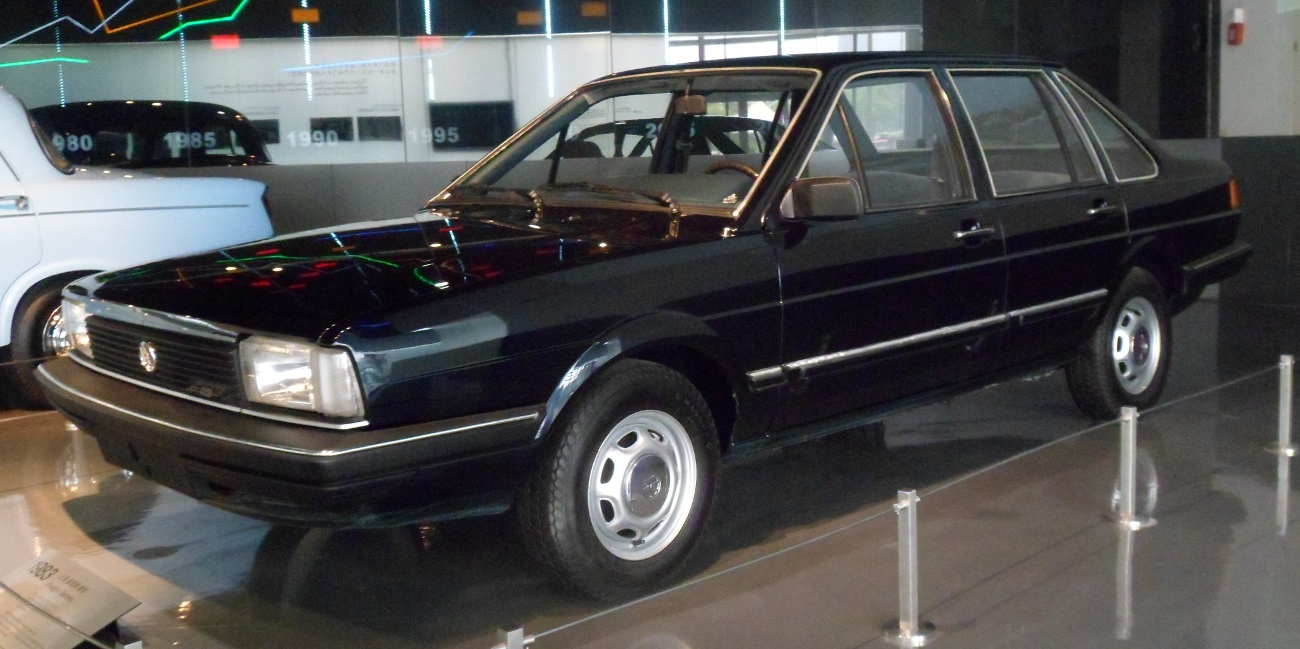
- A Santana on display inside the Shanghai Automobile Museum.

Overview
- Manufacturer: Shanghai Volkswagen Automotive
- Production: 1983–2013 (Sedan); 1992–2008 (Variant)
- Assembly: China: Shanghai

Body and chassis
- Class: Mid-size car
- Body style: 4-door saloon 5-door estate
- Platform: Volkswagen Group B2 platform
- Related: Volkswagen Passat (B2)

Powertrain
- Engine: 1.6 L EA113 I4 (petrol); 1.8 L EA113 I4 (petrol)
- Transmission: 4-speed manual 5-speed manual

Dimensions
- Wheelbase: 2,548 mm (100.3 in)
- Length: 4,546 mm (179.0 in)
- Width: 1,710 mm (67.3 in)
- Height: 1,427 mm (56.2 in)

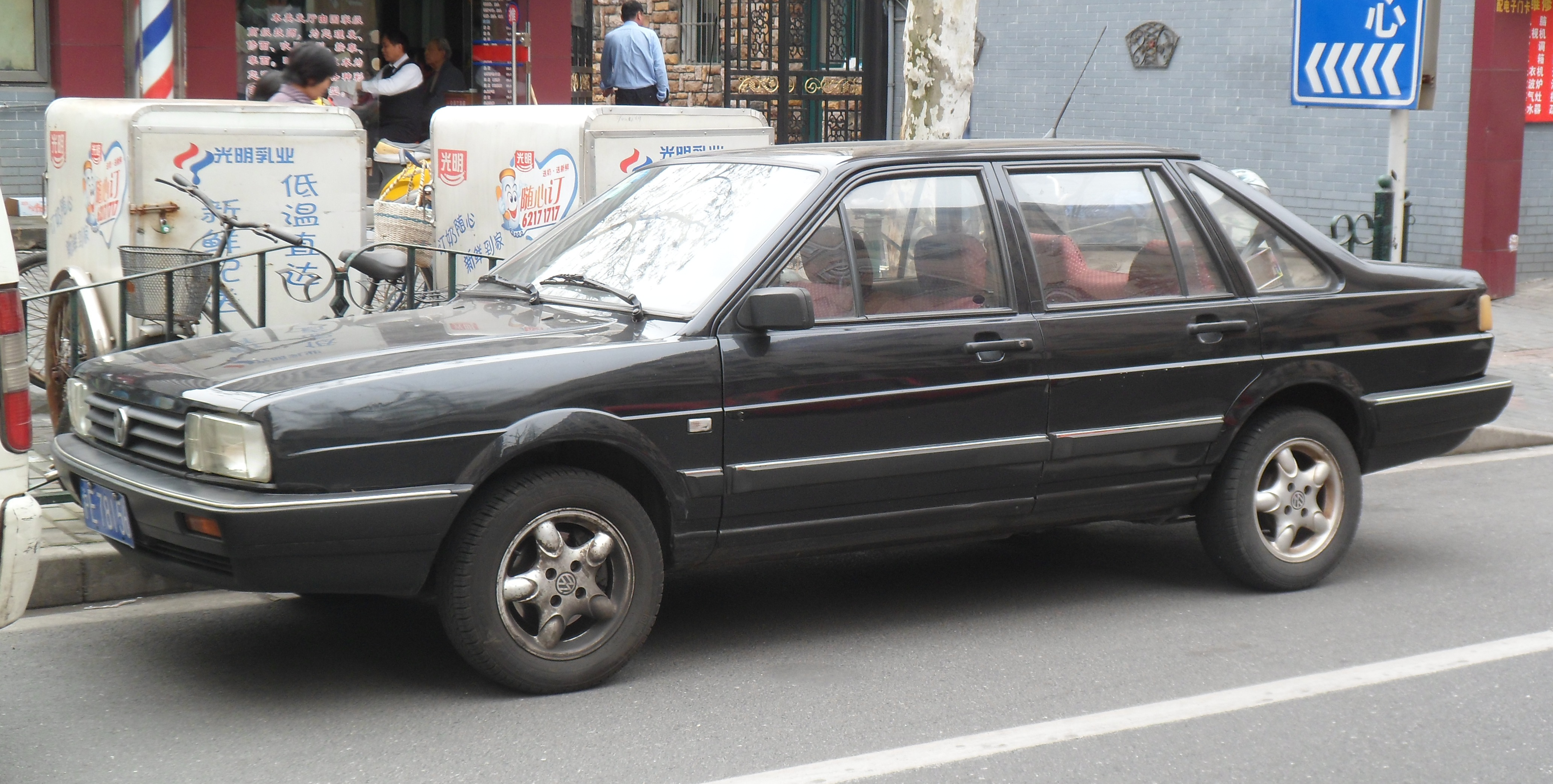

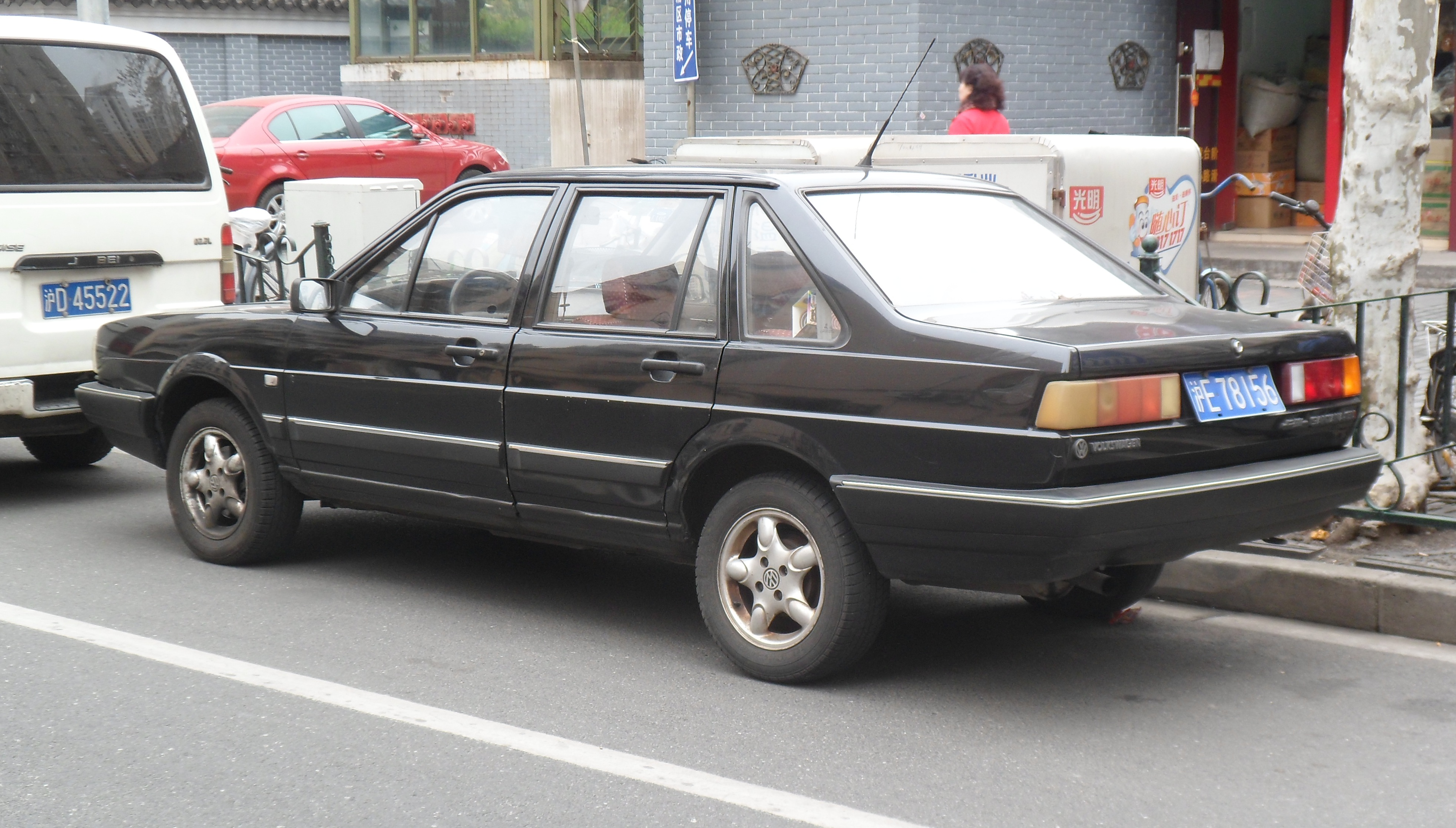
Santana (B2)

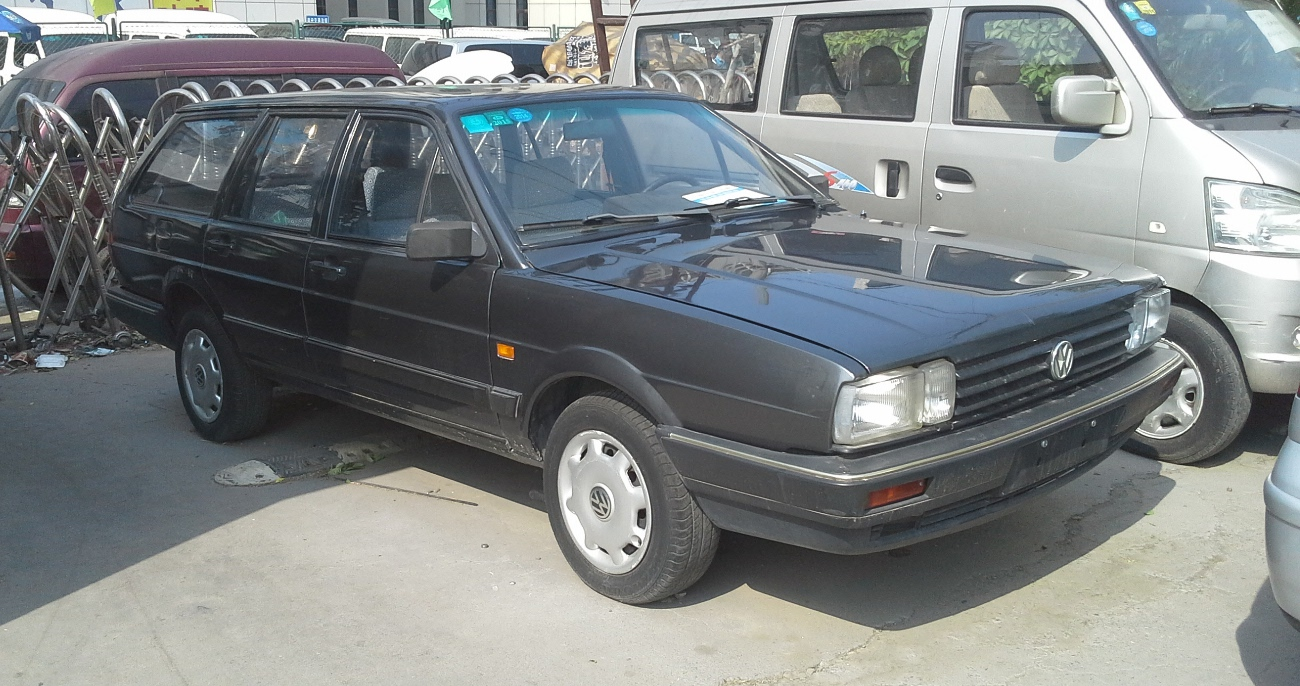

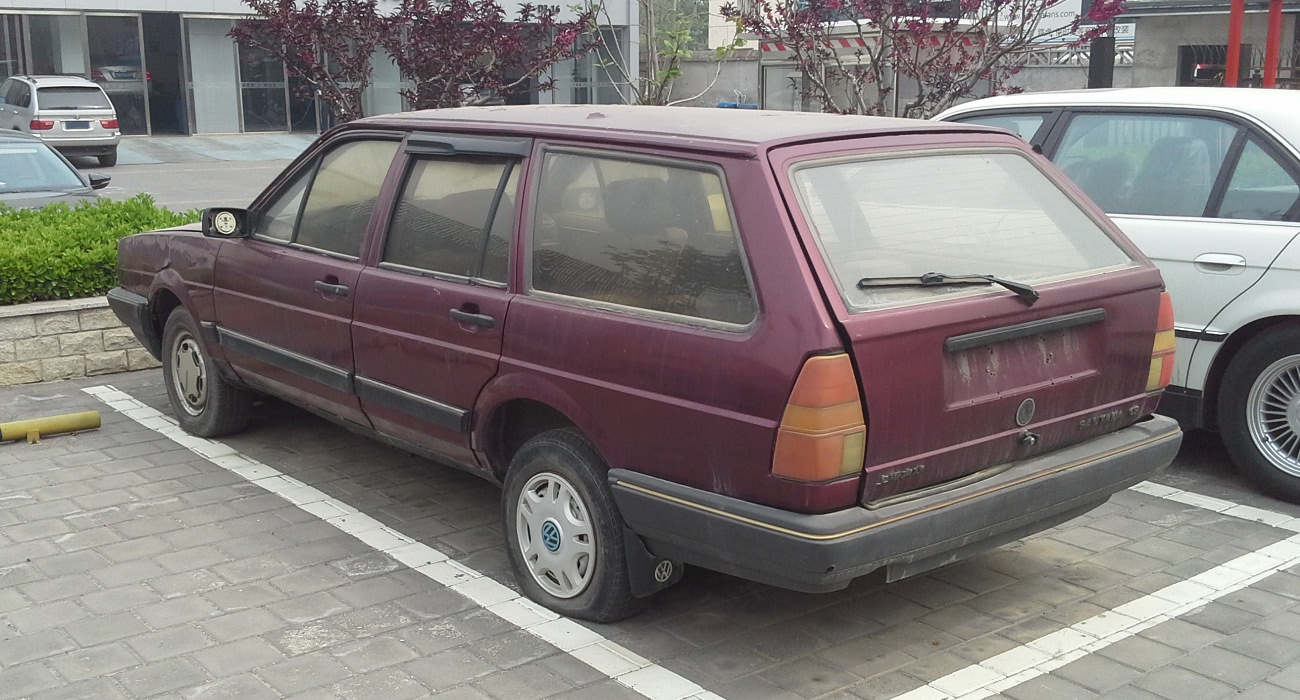
Santana Variant

The Santana's biggest success was in China. The Santana (B2) had been built in China on a small scale trial basis by the Shanghai Tractor Automobile Corporation (STAC), predecessor of the SAIC Motor, since 1982. The first 100 cars were built from CKD kits delivered from Germany. The first Volkswagen Santana was assembled in April 1983 by a team from Shanghai Auto. Volkswagen signed a contract with STAC, along with the China National Automotive Industry Corporation (CNAIC) and the Bank of China to form the Shanghai Volkswagen Automotive joint venture in October 1984. Production commenced in September 1985 while the first assembly line of the Santana started a month later. In September 1986, the 10,000th Santana was built in China. The car and venture laid the ground-works for China's mass motorization. The drive to fully localize production became the impetus for the Chinese auto parts industry: In 1986, the quota of made-in-China parts was below six percent. In 1995, the local content quota stood at 89 percent. The last Santana was assembled on January 15 2013.

Initially launched with a 1.6-litre petrol engine, the Santana was updated with a 1.8-litre petrol in 1987, first available in the Santana Variant station wagon introduced by Shanghai in April 1992. The first Santanas were all originally equipped with a four-speed manual transmission. This vehicle was very popular as a taxicab, having been in service dating back to 1987, along with policecars and other government services. The Santana has had a number of updated features added since the original 1983 model. Some updated features the Santana has been include with are Bosch electronic fuel injection system, a 5-speed manual, a third brake light, improved back seats, hydraulic clutch, MP3 and CD compatible radios, ABS brakes with electronic brake distribution.

=== Second generation (2000; 1995) ===
Volkswagen Santana (2000)
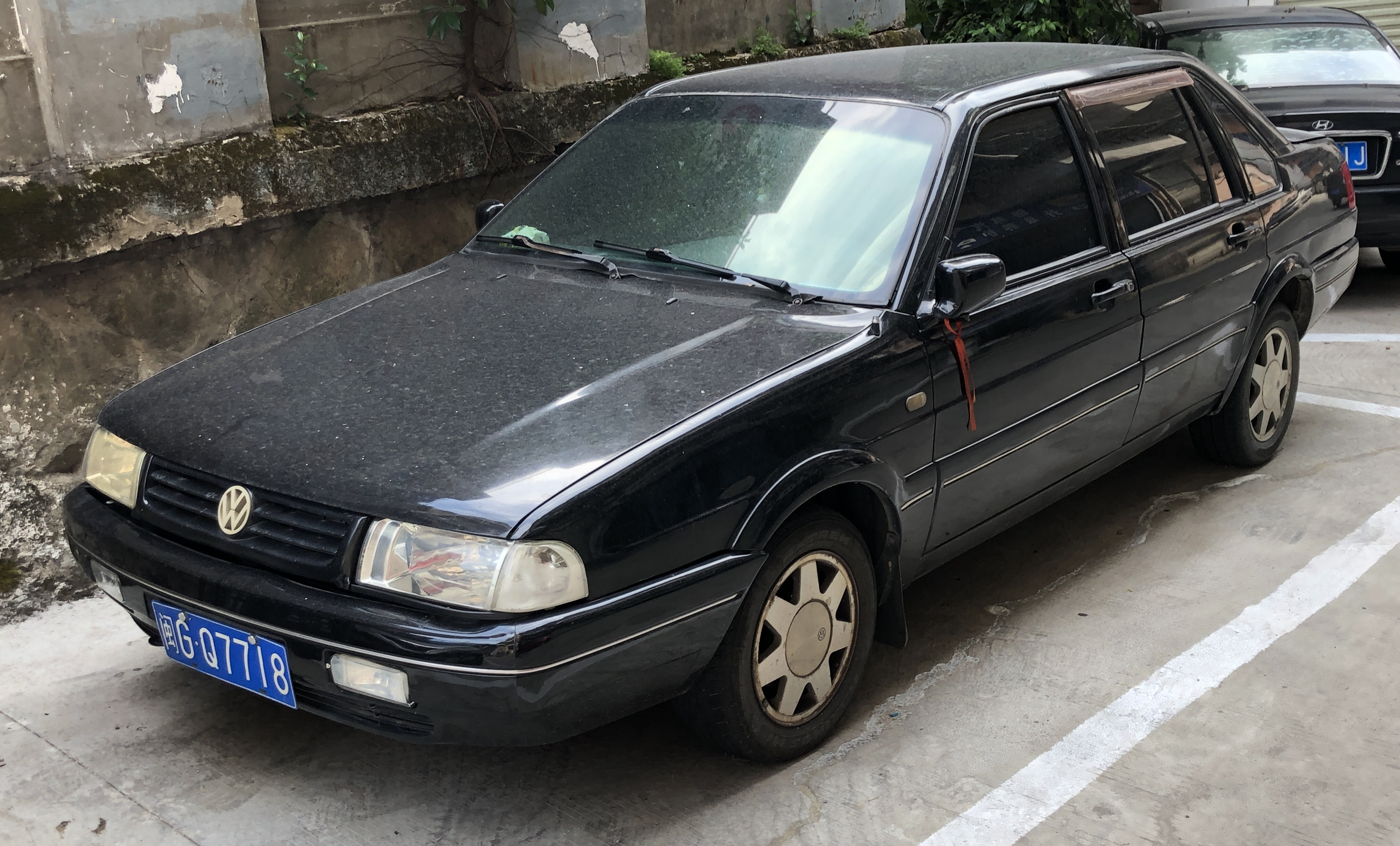
- The Santana 2000 in China.

Overview
- Manufacturer: Shanghai Volkswagen Automotive
- Also called: Volkswagen Santana 2000
- Production: 1995–2004
- Assembly: China: Shanghai

Body and chassis
- Class: Mid-size car
- Body style: 4-door saloon

Powertrain
- Engine: 1.8 L AYJ I4 (petrol)
- Transmission: 5-speed manual 4-speed automatic

Dimensions
- Wheelbase: 2,656 mm (104.6 in)
- Length: 4,680 mm (184.3 in)
- Width: 1,700 mm (66.9 in)
- Height: 1,423 mm (56.0 in)

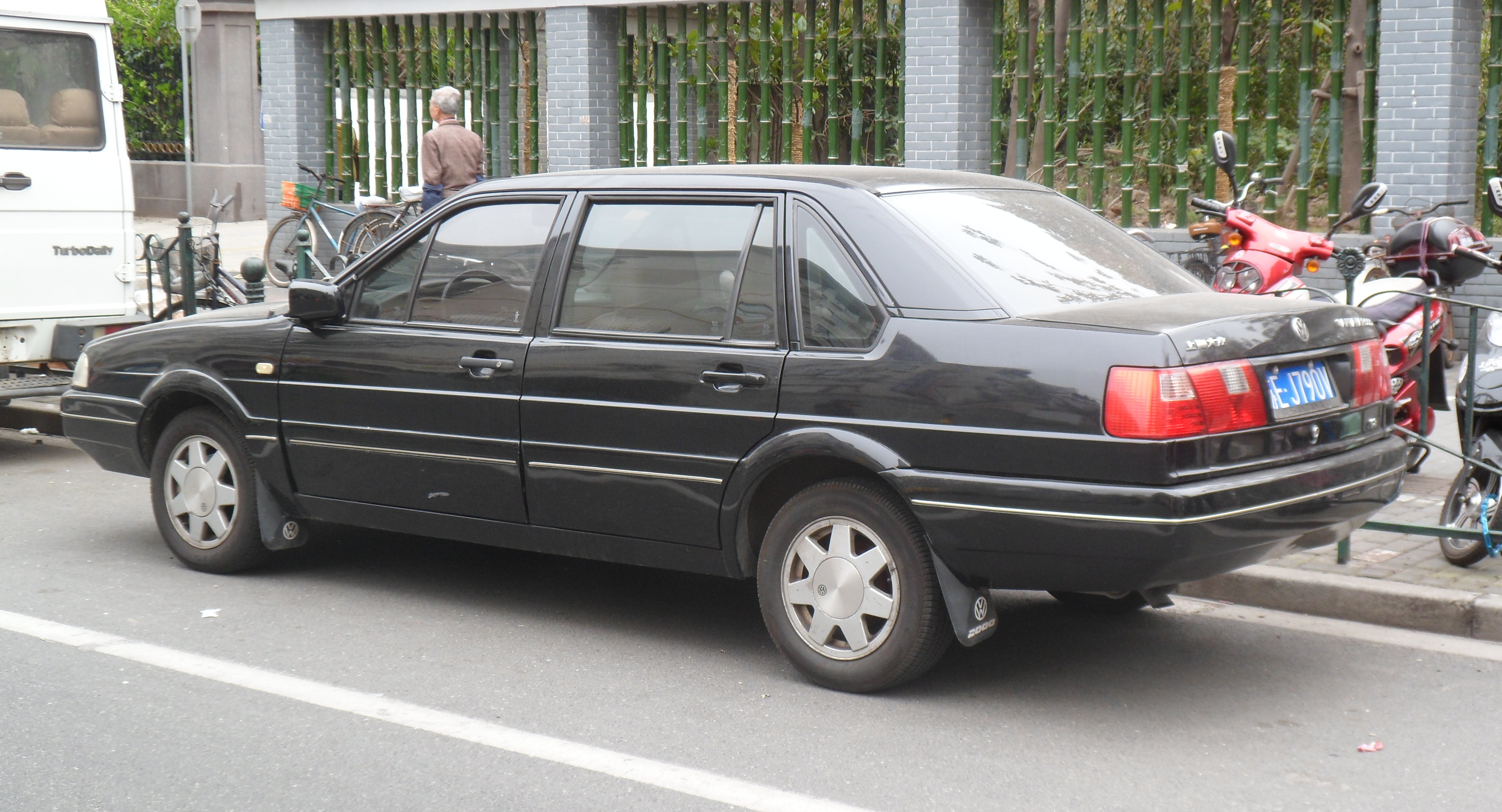
Rear ¾ view

In 1991 the Santana 2000 was put into development for China with the aid of Volkswagen do Brasil. It was introduced in 1994 and started mass production in April 1995 with a longer wheelbase and rear doors than its Brazilian counterpart.

=== Facelift (3000; 2004) ===
Volkswagen Santana (3000)
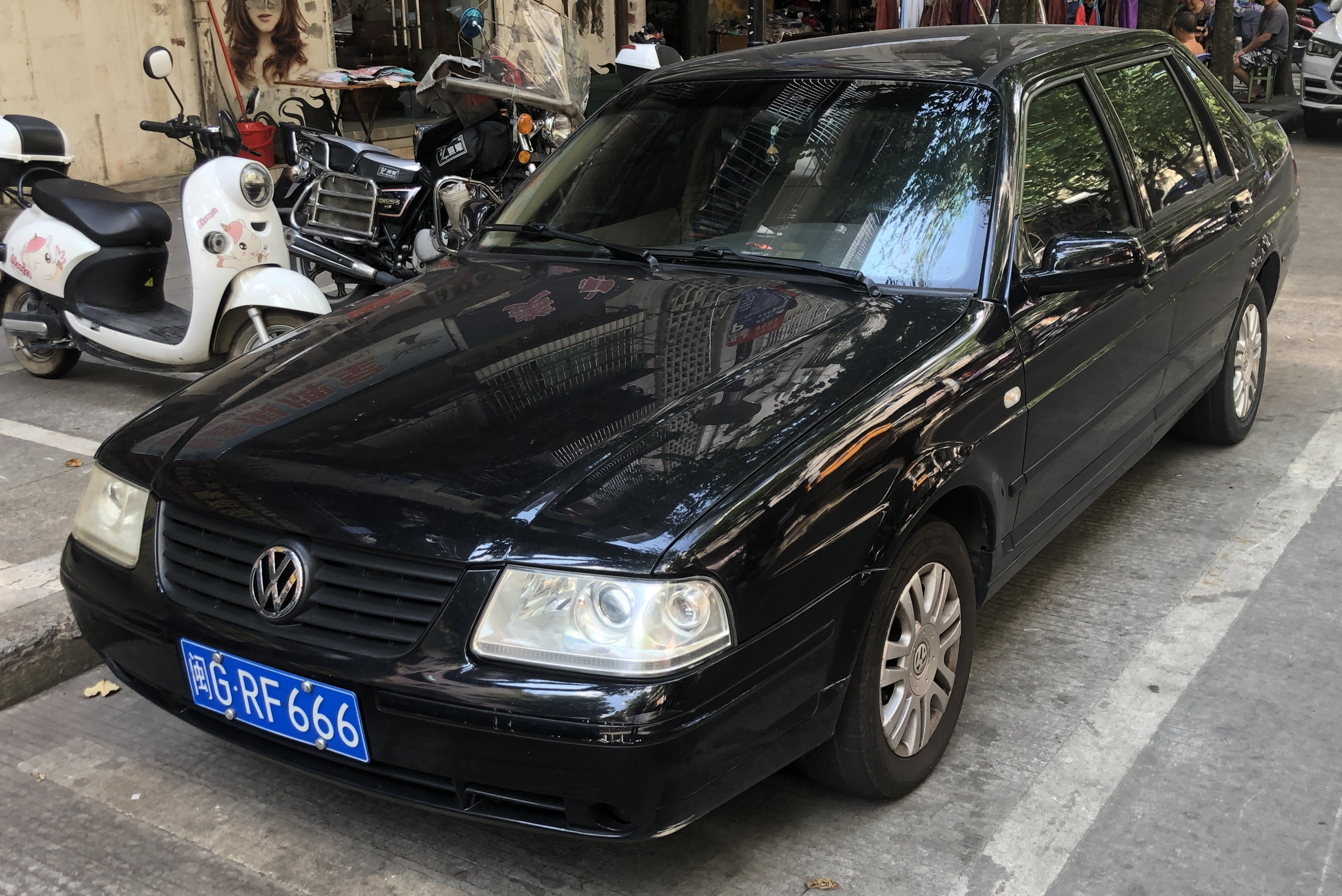
- A Santana 3000 in China.

Overview
- Manufacturer: Shanghai Volkswagen Automotive
- Also called: Volkswagen Santana 3000
- Production: 2004–2008
- Assembly: China: Shanghai

Body and chassis
- Class: Mid-size car
- Body style: 4-door saloon

Powertrain
- Engine: 1.6 L EA113 I4 (petrol); 1.8 L EA113 I4 (petrol); 2.0 L EA113 I4 (petrol)
- Transmission: 5-speed manual 4-speed automatic

Dimensions
- Wheelbase: 2,656 mm (104.6 in)
- Length: 4,687 mm (184.5 in)
- Width: 1,700 mm (66.9 in)
- Height: 1,450 mm (57.1 in)

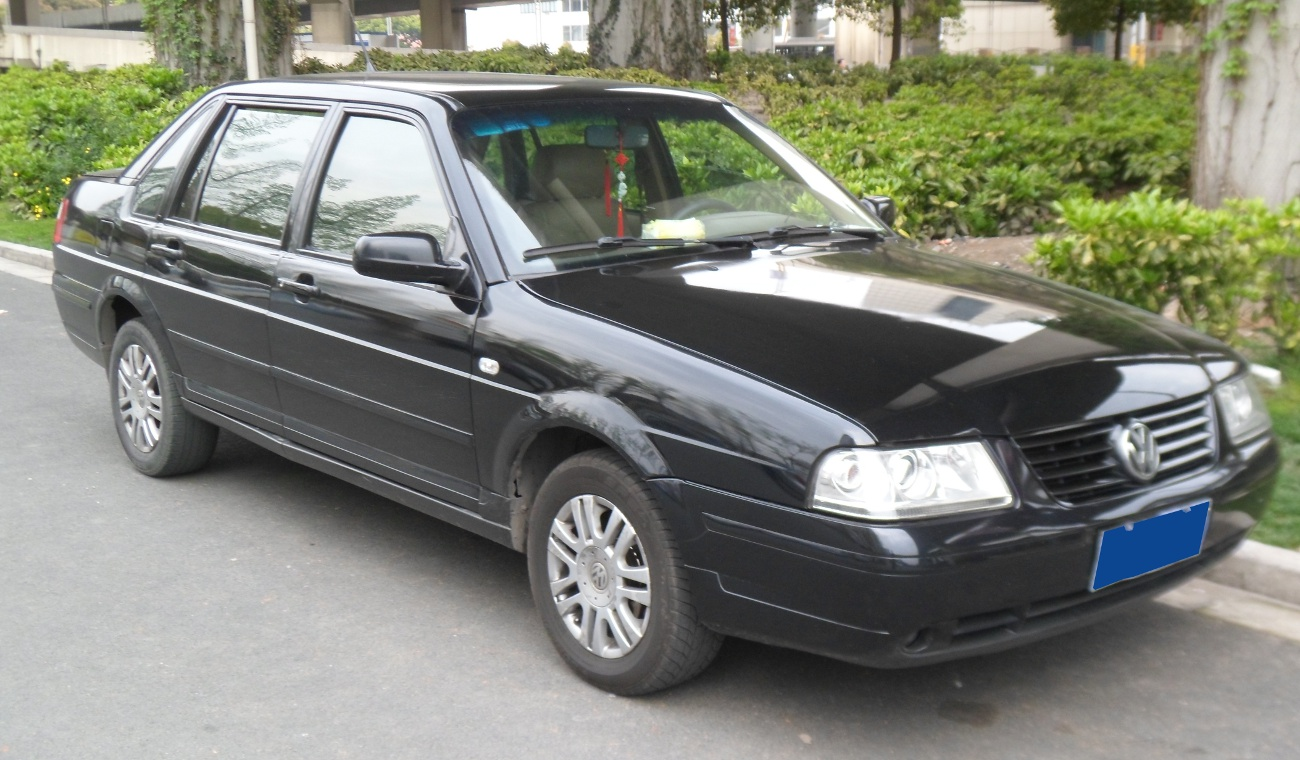

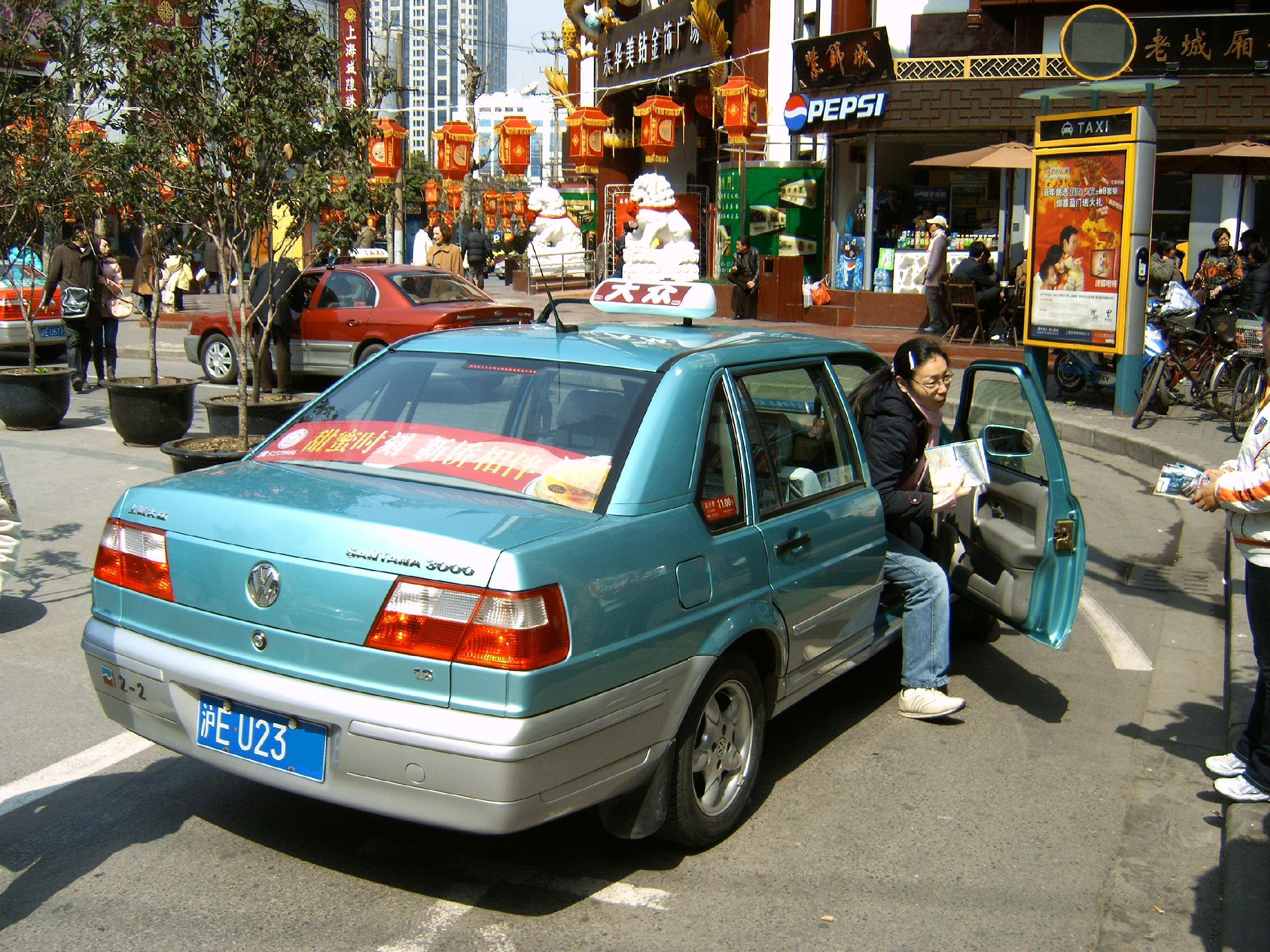
Santana 3000

On March 2 2004, Shanghai Volkswagen Automotive introduced a heavily facelifted Santana 2000, the Santana 3000. It was the first design that the Shanghai Volkswagen Automotive joint venture designers had undertaken by themselves. The Santana 3000 was also the first in the Chinese developed Santana series to be available with optional ABS brakes with electronic brake distribution, electronic differential system, a multi function display system, and a sunroof designed by the German Webasto company. The 2.0-litre engine was added to the range in June 2006.

=== Second facelift (Vista; 2008) ===
Volkswagen Santana (Vista)
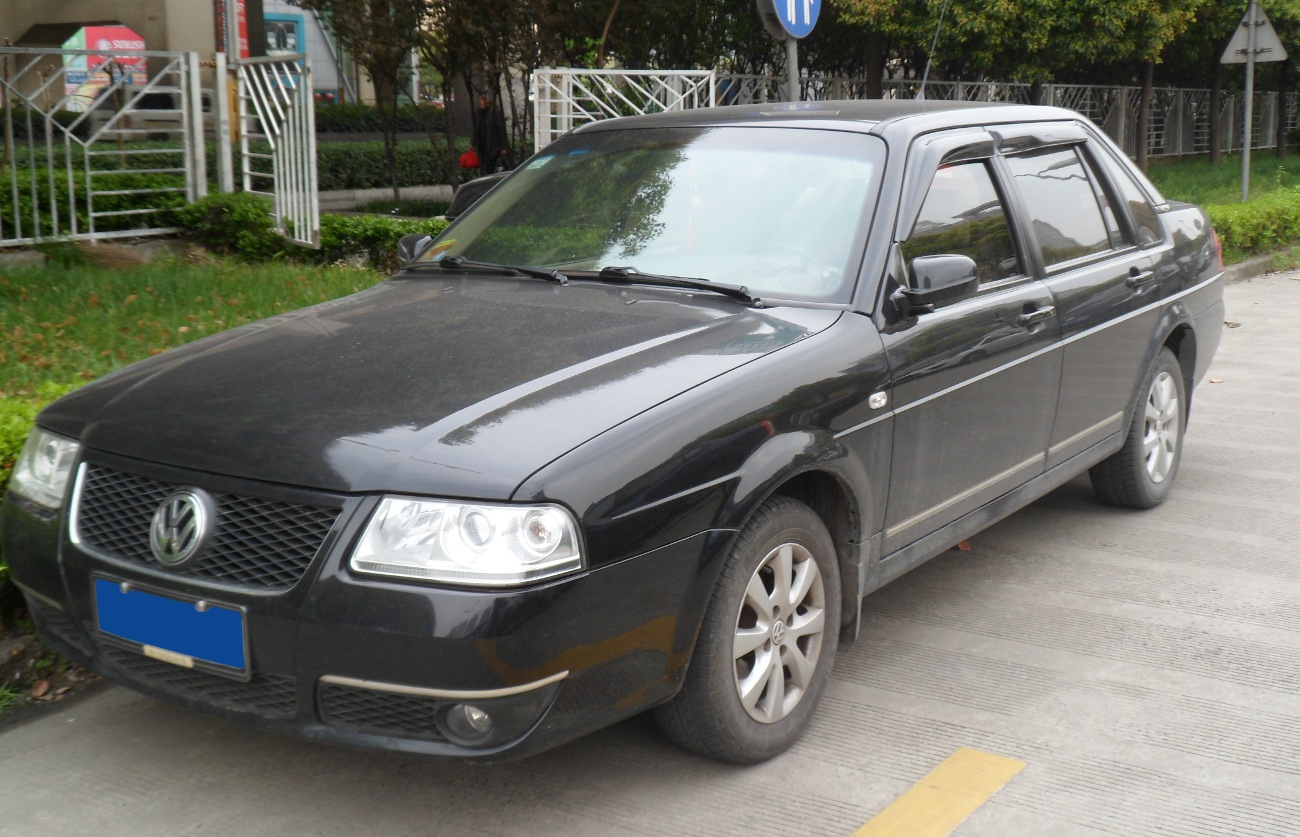
- The Santana Vista.

Overview
- Manufacturer: Shanghai Volkswagen Automotive
- Also called: Volkswagen Santana Zhijun (Chinese name); Volkswagen Santana Vista Changda (Taxi version)
- Production: 2008–2013 (until 2018 for taxi fleet)
- Assembly: China: Shanghai

Body and chassis
- Class: Mid-size car
- Body style: 4-door saloon

Powertrain
- Engine: 1.6 L EA113 I4 (petrol); 1.8 L EA113 I4 (petrol); 2.0 L EA113 I4 (petrol)
- Transmission: 5-speed manual 4-speed automatic

Dimensions
- Wheelbase: 2,656 mm (104.6 in)
- Length: 4,687 mm (184.5 in)
- Width: 1,700 mm (66.9 in)
- Height: 1,450 mm (57.1 in)

Chronology
- Successor: Volkswagen Passat Lingyu

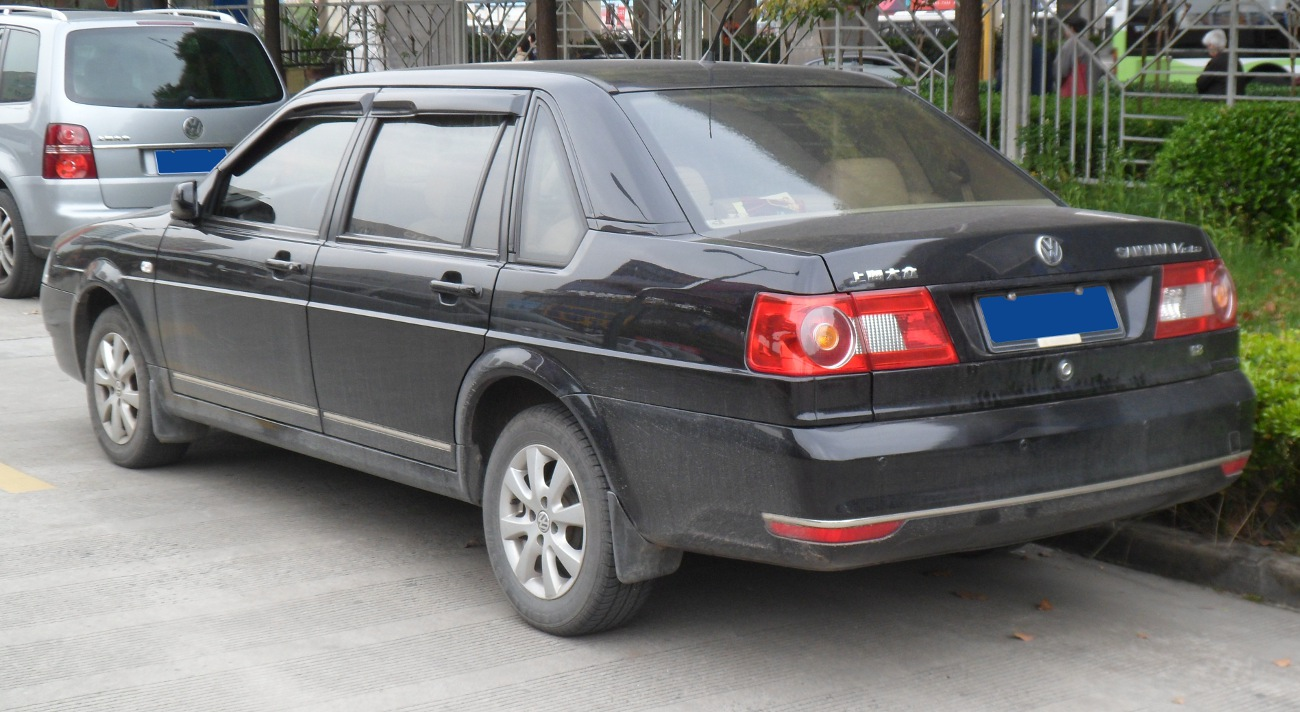

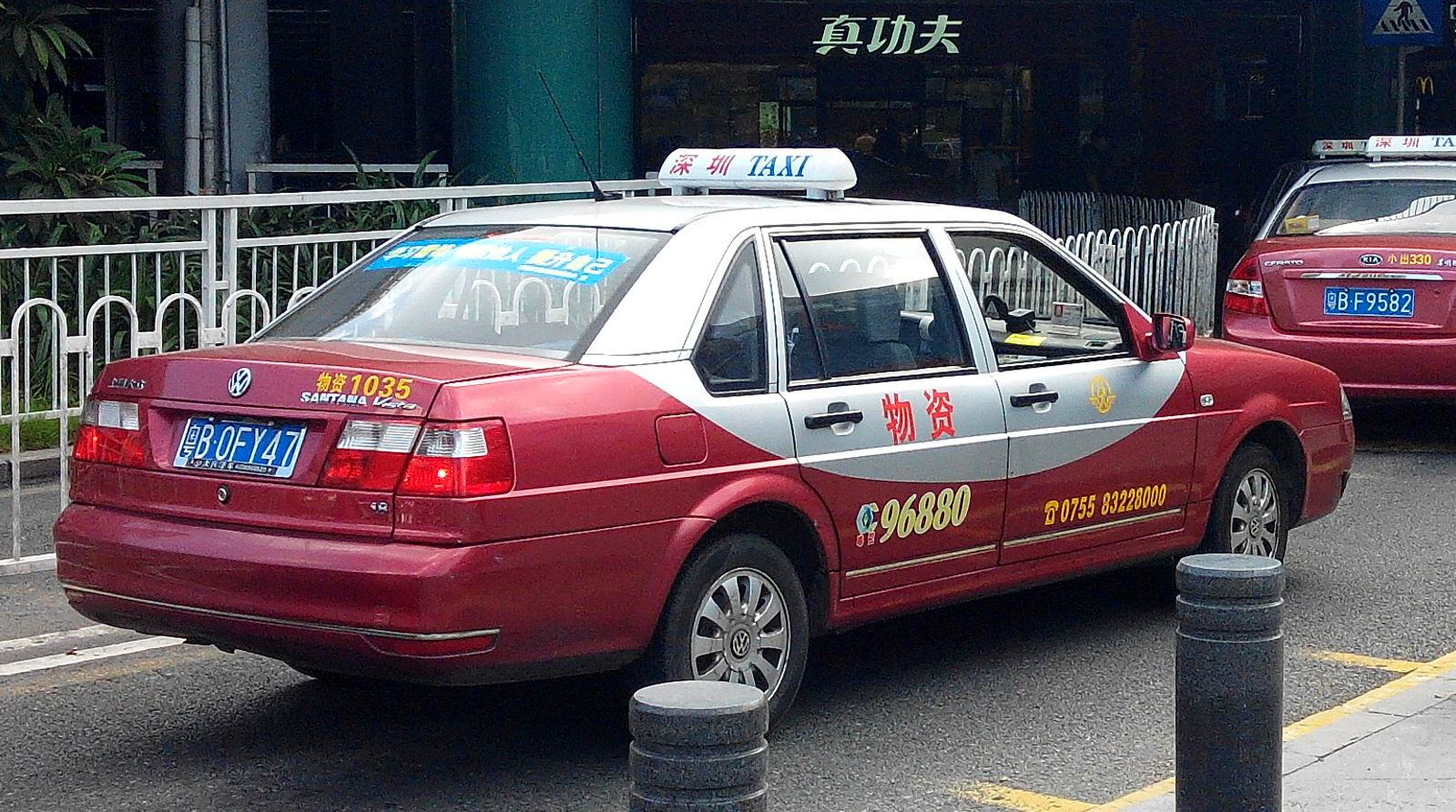
Santana Vista rear passenger version (top)
Santana Vista rear taxi version (bottom)

On January 6 2008, Shanghai Volkswagen Automotive released the Santana Vista (Zhijun) and Santana Vista (Changda) (Taxi model), featuring front and rear visual updates and minor chassis modifications. The passenger version of the Vista can be recognized by its mesh grille, chrome accents located low on the bumpers, and redesigned taillights with circular elements whereas the taxi version had a razor blade-like grille, same taillights like the Santana 3000 and new wheels.

As of May 2011 the original German designed Santana (both sedan and Variant versions) was still sold in China alongside the updated Santana Vista, which were popular with taxi and police fleets, as well as with private buyers. A 1.6-litre version of the Santana Vista (1,595 cc, 70 kW or 95 PS) has been added to the bottom of the lineup to further boost sales. There were 3,213,710 units made since CKD production began in 1983 up until May 2009. Nonetheless, Shanghai Volkswagen Automotive decided to discontinue the Santana in 2012. Production continued in China with the Santana sedan and Gran Santana hatchback until 2022. The classic Santana Vista taxi was phased out in October 2018 in favour of 100 new electric cabs for Shanghai's taxi fleet as well as the Volkswagen Touran, which offered greater comfort for passengers.

=== Third generation (A05; 2012) ===
Volkswagen Santana (A05)
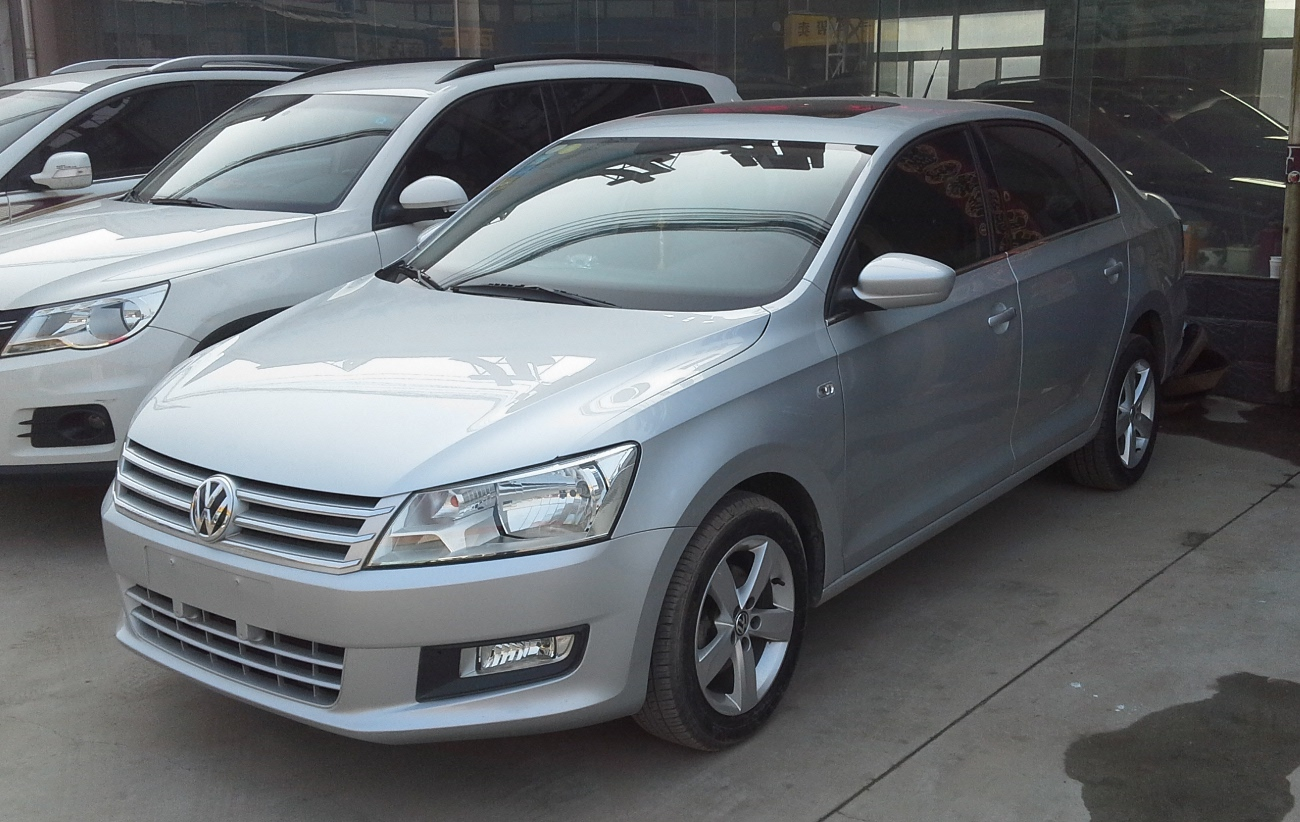

Overview
- Also called: Volkswagen New Santana; Volkswagen Gran Santana/Santana GTS (wagon); Volkswagen Cross Santana (crossover version)
- Production: 2012–2022 (China)
- Model years: 2013–2022 (Santana); 2015–2022 (Gran Santana/Santana GTS); 2016–2022 (Cross Santana)
- Assembly: China: Yizheng, Jiangsu; Ürümqi, Xinjiang (SAIC-VW)

Body and chassis
- Class: Subcompact car
- Body style: 4-door saloon 5-door estate
- Platform: Volkswagen Group A05+
- Related: Seat Toledo Mk4; Škoda Rapid; Volkswagen New Jetta

Powertrain
- Engine: 1.4 L EA211 I4 (petrol); 1.5 L EA211 I4 (petrol)
- Transmission: 5-speed manual 6-speed automatic 7-speed DSG (Gran Santana)

Dimensions
- Wheelbase: 2,603 mm (102.5 in)
- Length: 4,473 mm (176.1 in)
- Width: 1,706 mm (67.2 in)
- Height: 1,469 mm (57.8 in)
- Curb weight: 1,100 kg (2,425.1 lb) (1.4 litre variants); 1,120 kg (2,469.2 lb) (1.6 litre Manual variants); 1,160 kg (2,557.4 lb) (1.6 litre Automatic variants)

Chronology
- Predecessor: Volkswagen Polo Mk5 (Philippines)
- Successor: Volkswagen Lavida XR

On October 29, 2012, the new Santana was introduced in Wolfsburg, Germany as a subcompact B-segment car. It was built to fulfill the Chinese market demand. The new Santana is built in Anting and Ürümqi in China and its basis uses the Volkswagen Group A05+ platform, sharing the same platform as the Volkswagen New Jetta, another Chinese built Volkswagen model.

The New Santana has been redesigned for more power and a sleeker design.

Production for the New Santana commenced in December 2012. A hatchback variant is known as the Gran Santana and had been sold after the facelift from June 2015. The Cross Santana was launched a year later.

In May 2018, the Santana - along with the Tiguan, Lavida, and Lamando - was launched in the Philippines as part of the new ASEAN-China Free Trade Agreement (ACFTA). Although production ended in 2022, the remaining Inventory still sold until it was discontinued in September 2025, following the termination of Distributorship Agreement between AC Industrials and Volkswagen Group.

It was replaced by the Virtus-based Lavida XR which was launched on 7 June 2023, over a year after the Discontinuation of Santana.

=== Gallery ===
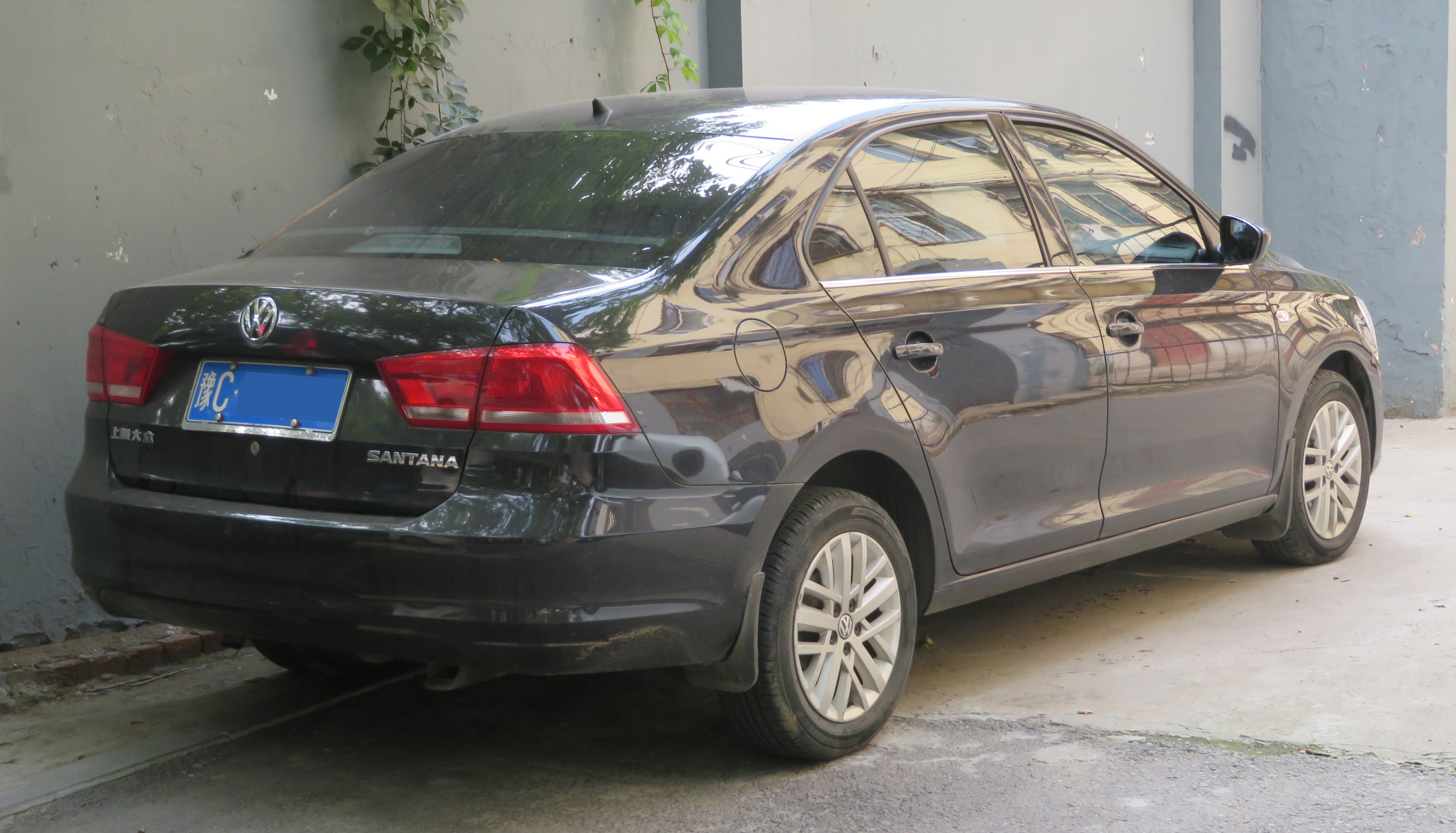
Volkswagen Santana II rear

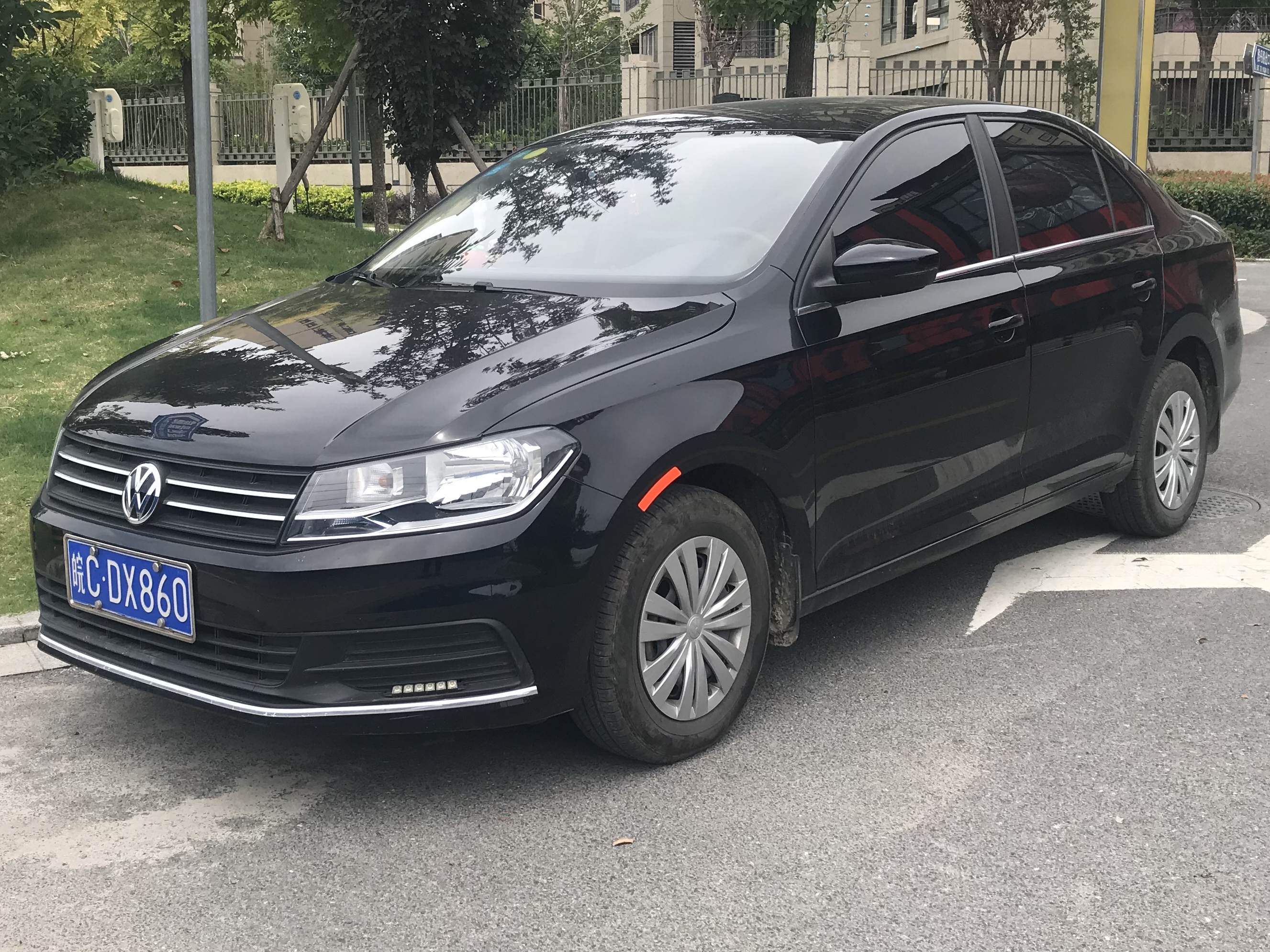
Volkswagen Santana II facelift front

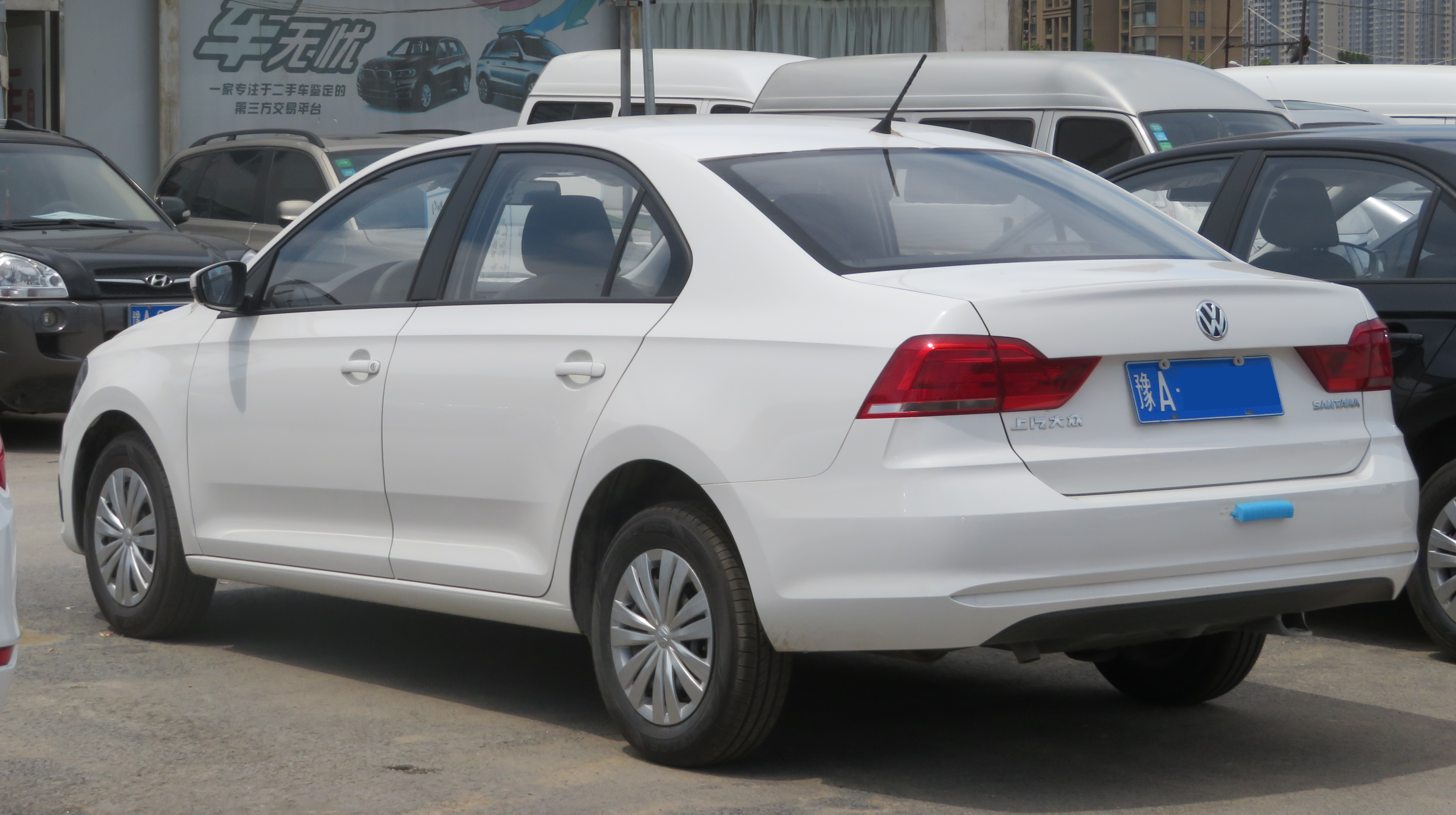
Volkswagen Santana II facelift rear

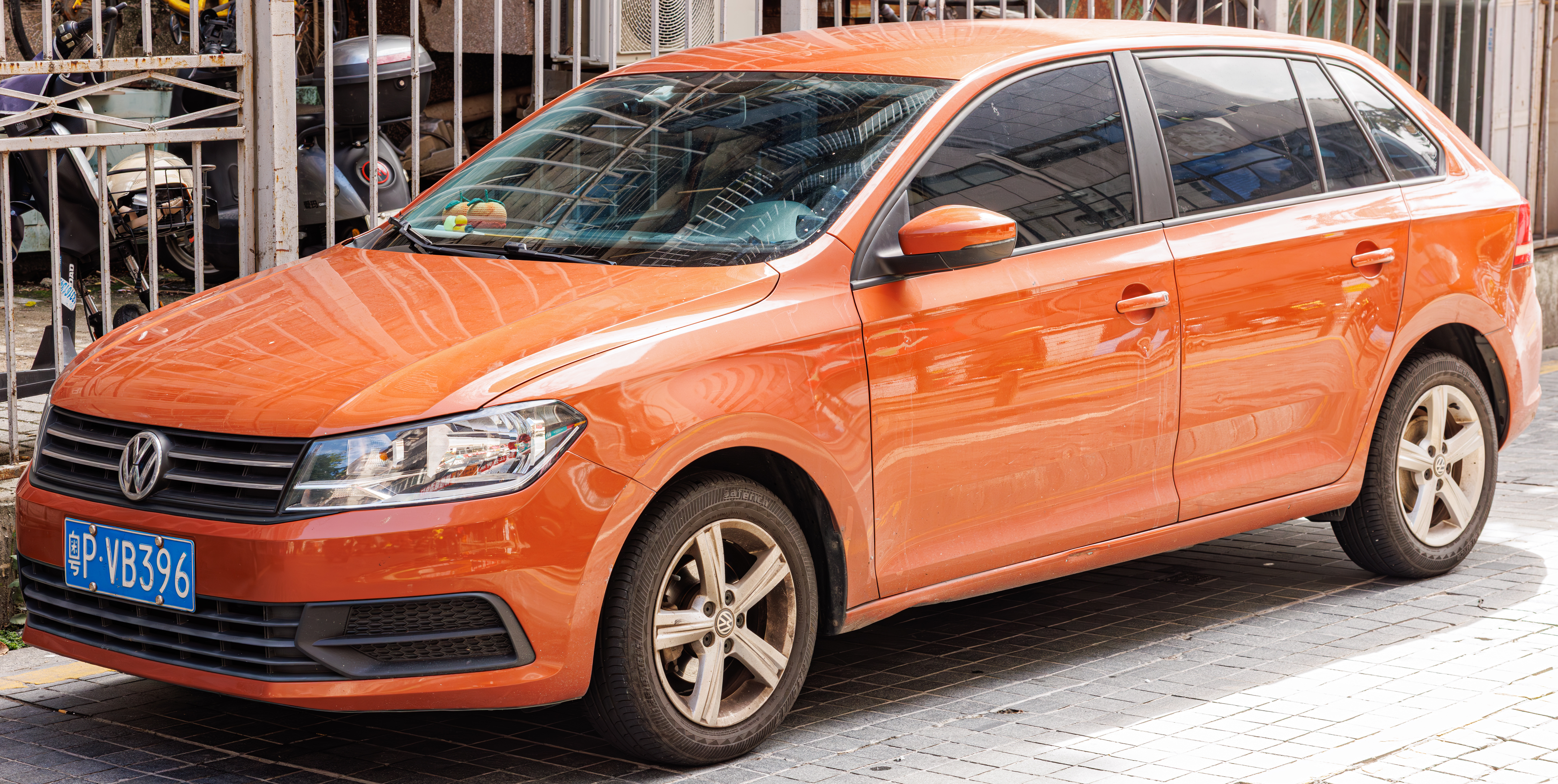
Volkswagen Gran Santana front

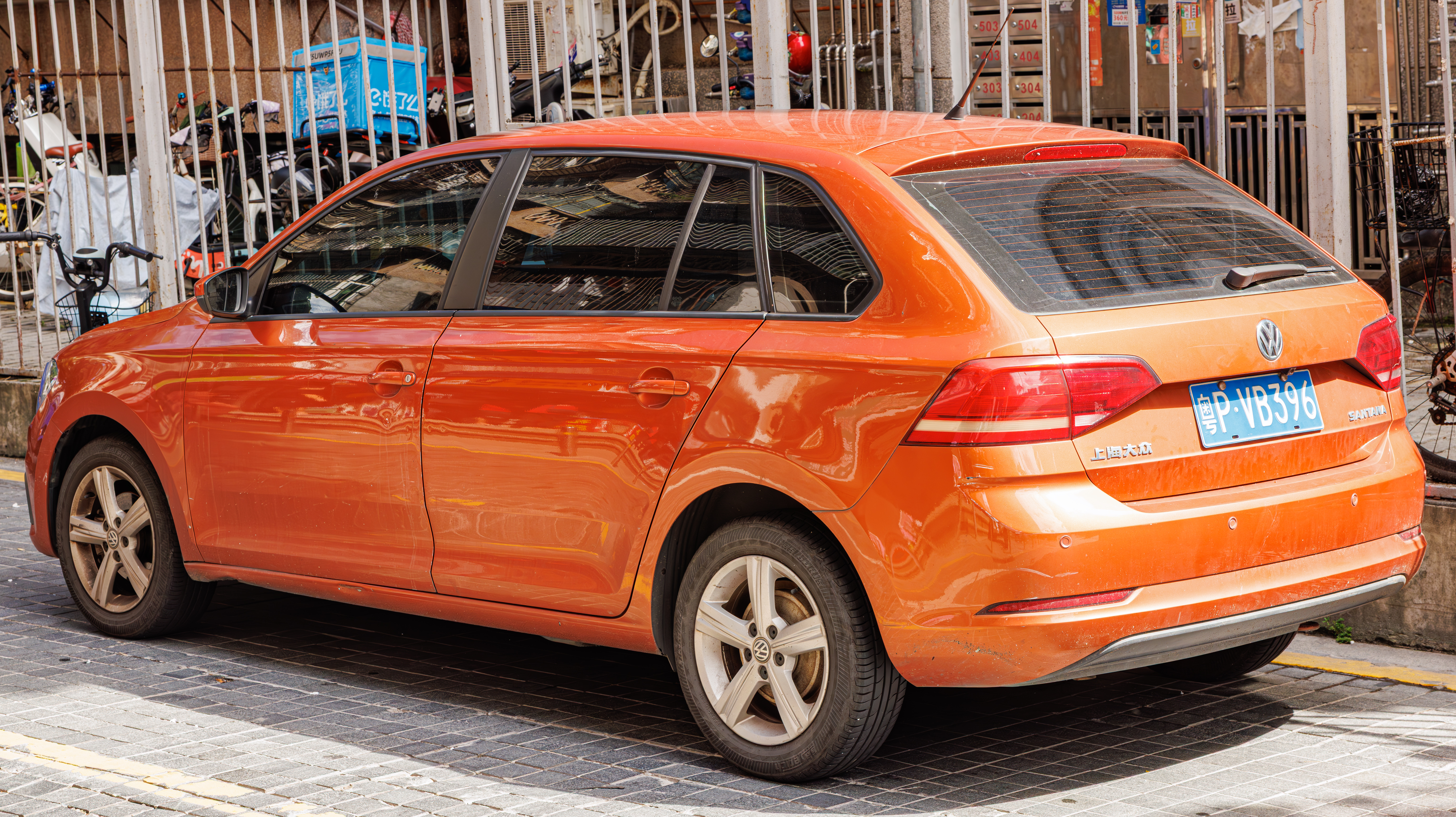
Volkswagen Gran Santana rear

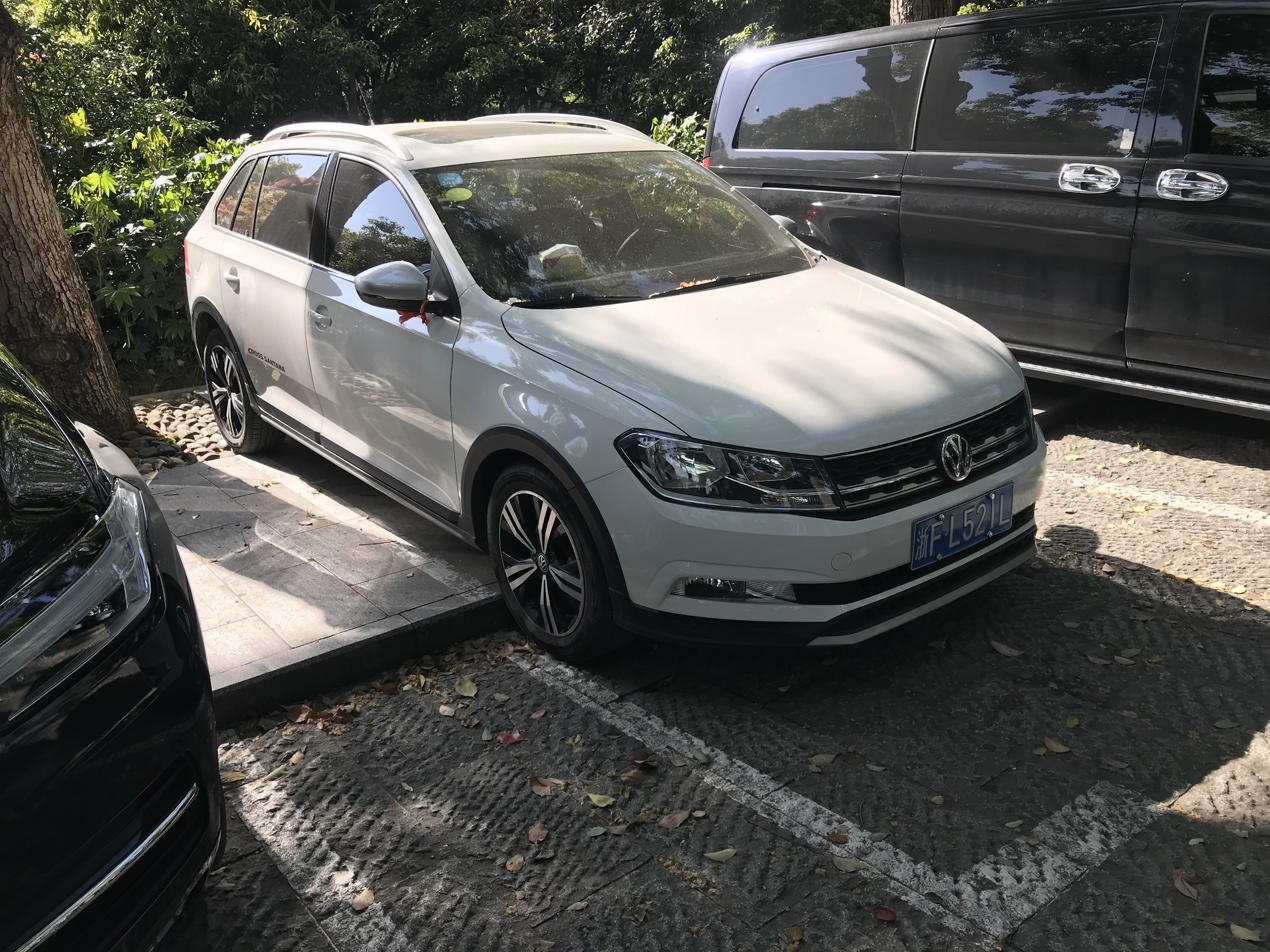
Volkswagen Cross Santana front

== Santana (Japan; 1984–1989) ==
Volkswagen Santana (Japan)
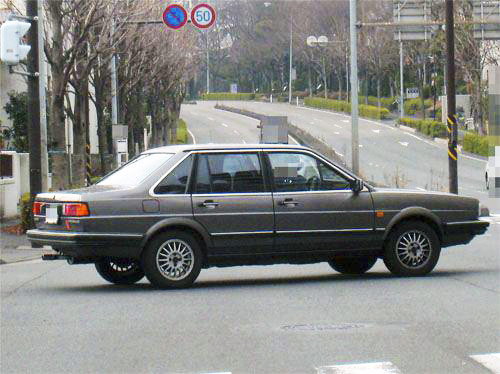
- A Santana in use in Japan.

Overview
- Manufacturer: Nissan
- Production: 1984–1989
- Assembly: Japan: Kanagawa

Body and chassis
- Class: Mid-size car
- Body style: 4-door saloon
- Platform: Volkswagen Group B2 platform
- Related: Volkswagen Passat (B2)

Powertrain
- Engine: 1.8 L I4 (petrol); 2.0 L I5 (petrol); 1.6 L I4 (turbo diesel)
- Transmission: 5-speed manual 3-speed automatic

Dimensions
- Wheelbase: 2,548 mm (100.3 in)
- Length: 4,530 mm (178.3 in)
- Width: 1,690 mm (66.5 in)
- Height: 1,395 mm (54.9 in)

Aiming at a full partnership with Volkswagen, Nissan's then President Takashi Ishihara decided that producing the Santana for the Japanese market would be a good stepping stone. Negotiations began in 1981, and by February 1984, Nissan begun knock-down kit production of the Santana at its Zama plant in Kanagawa, Japan. The Santana received the internal model code M30. The price of the Santana was considerably lower than of imported Volkswagens.

Nissan's Santana was changed for Japan with a right hand drive wiper layout (parking on the passenger side) which, as well as a new linkage mechanism, also required a new bonnet pressing as there were recesses in the trailing edge for the wiper pivots. VW-built cars, in common with some of the maker's other models at this time, such as the MKII Golf, had the same LHD wiper pattern regardless of steering wheel location. At introduction, the Santana was available with three different engines: A 100 PS (74 kW) 1781 cc four (Li, Gi), a 110 PS (81 kW) 1,994 cc five (Gi5, Xi5) and a 72 PS (53 kW) 1,588 cc turbodiesel four (Lt, Gt Diesel Turbo). All came with a five-speed manual transmission as standard, while the gasoline engines were also available with a three-speed automatic. The Santana was 5 mm narrower than its German counterparts, so as to avoid a massive Japanese tax on cars wider than 1690 mm. Additionally, the grille and headlights were unique to the M30 Santana.

In May 1985 the Xi5 Autobahn version was added to the lineup, offering velour sports seats, electric sunroof and 14-inch alloy wheels. In January 1987 the Santana received a facelift, with a new fascia and new larger bumpers. The Turbodiesel was discontinued, leaving only gasoline-engined versions. The 1.8-litre Gi version was down to 91 PS (67 kW), while the Li and Gi5 equipment grades were dropped. The Xi5 Autobahn was now available with a new engine, however, as a DOHC version of the 2-litre five appeared with 140 PS (103 kW). With sales, originally aimed at 4,000-5,000 per month, only having reached 50,000 over seven years, Nissan ended production in October 1989. Sales of remaining stock continued until May 1990. Instead of renewing the production license, they began selling the new, third-generation Volkswagen Passat through their dealer network. As Volkswagen and Toyota began cooperating in 1991, sales of Volkswagens through Nissan dealers came to a halt.

== Santana (Brazil; 1984–2006) ==
Volkswagen Santana (Brazil)
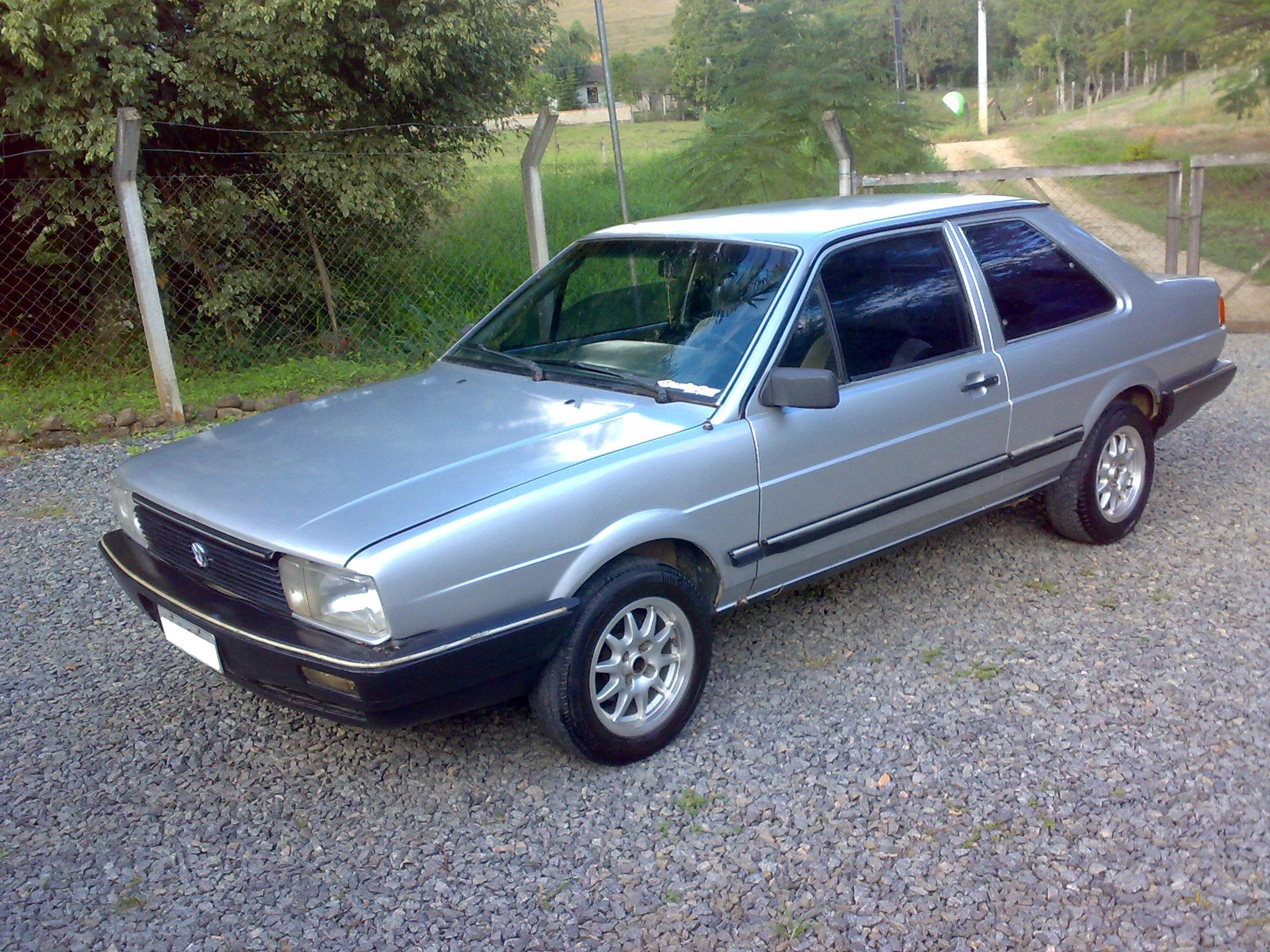
- The Brazilian Volkswagen Santana.

Overview
- Manufacturer: Volkswagen
- Also called: Ford Versailles; Volkswagen Quantum (station wagon)
- Production: 1984–2006
- Assembly: Brazil: São Bernardo do Campo, São Paulo

Body and chassis
- Class: Mid-size car
- Body style: 2-door coupé 4-door saloon 5-door estate
- Platform: Volkswagen Group B2 platform
- Related: Volkswagen Passat (B2)

Powertrain
- Engine: 1.8 L EA827 I4 (petrol); 2.0 L EA827 I4 (petrol)
- Transmission: 5-speed manual 4-speed manual 3-speed automatic

Dimensions
- Wheelbase: 2,550 mm (100.4 in)
- Length: 4,600 mm (181.1 in)
- Width: 1,700 mm (66.9 in)
- Height: 1,420 mm (55.9 in)

The Santana entered production in Brazil in June, 1984. It was originally sold as a 4-door and 2-door saloon, with the station wagon Santana Quantum (later simply Quantum) being launched in July 1985. The 2-door coupé was exclusive to Brazil.

The engine range consisted of two versions of the familiar 1.8-litre Volkswagen EA827 engine, running on ethanol or petrol. In May 1988 it gained the option of a 2.0-litre engine (petrol or ethanol). Thus equipped they were known as Santana/Quantum 2000. Transmissions included a 4-speed manual (for the first two years), 5-speed manual (first as an option but made standard in 1987), and for the top line CD (later GLS) a 3-speed automatic.

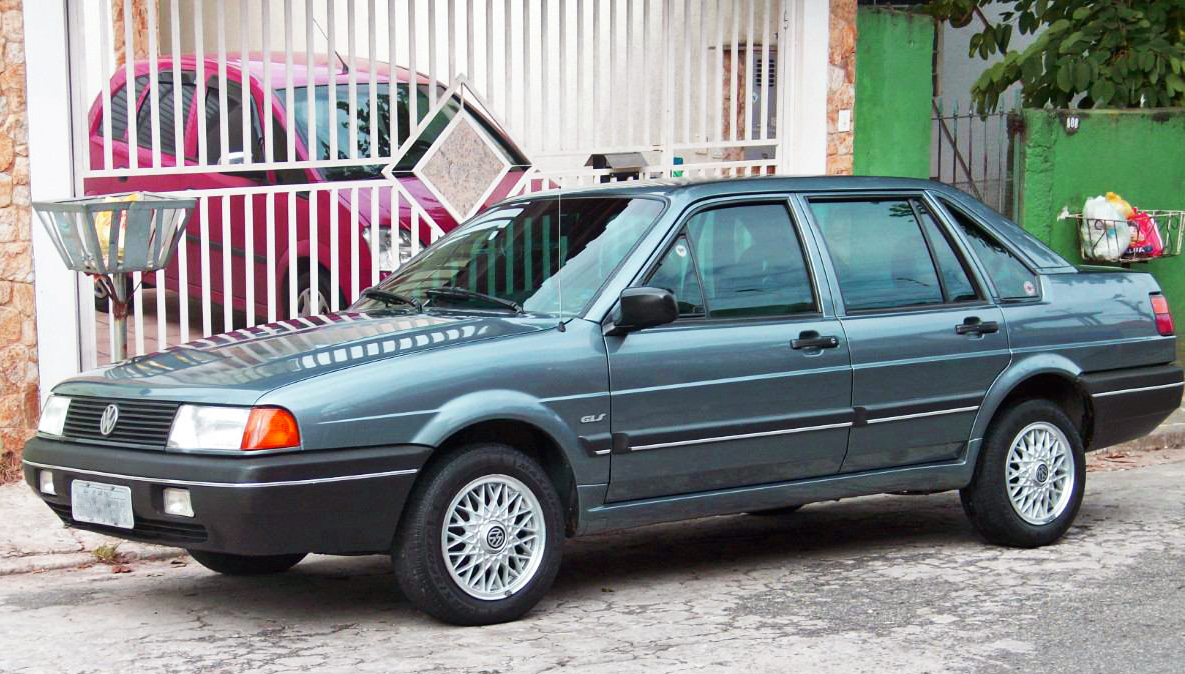
1992 Volkswagen Santana 2000 GLS

In 1991, Volkswagen do Brasil then engaged in a joint venture with Ford called AutoLatina, decided to retain the Passat (B2) shaped sedan and wagon instead of building the newer third-generation Passat (B3). Thorough changes to the bodyshell, boot line, front and rear guards, meant it looked considerably more modern than its predecessor, if not quite at par with the B3. Under the terms of AutoLatina, this "new" Santana was also marketed as the Ford Versailles in Brazil and as the Ford Galaxy in Argentina. The 3-door (later 5-door) station wagon was sold as the Ford Royale. 1991 also marked the introduction of ABS brakes and catalytic converters, both firsts for the Brazilian car industry.

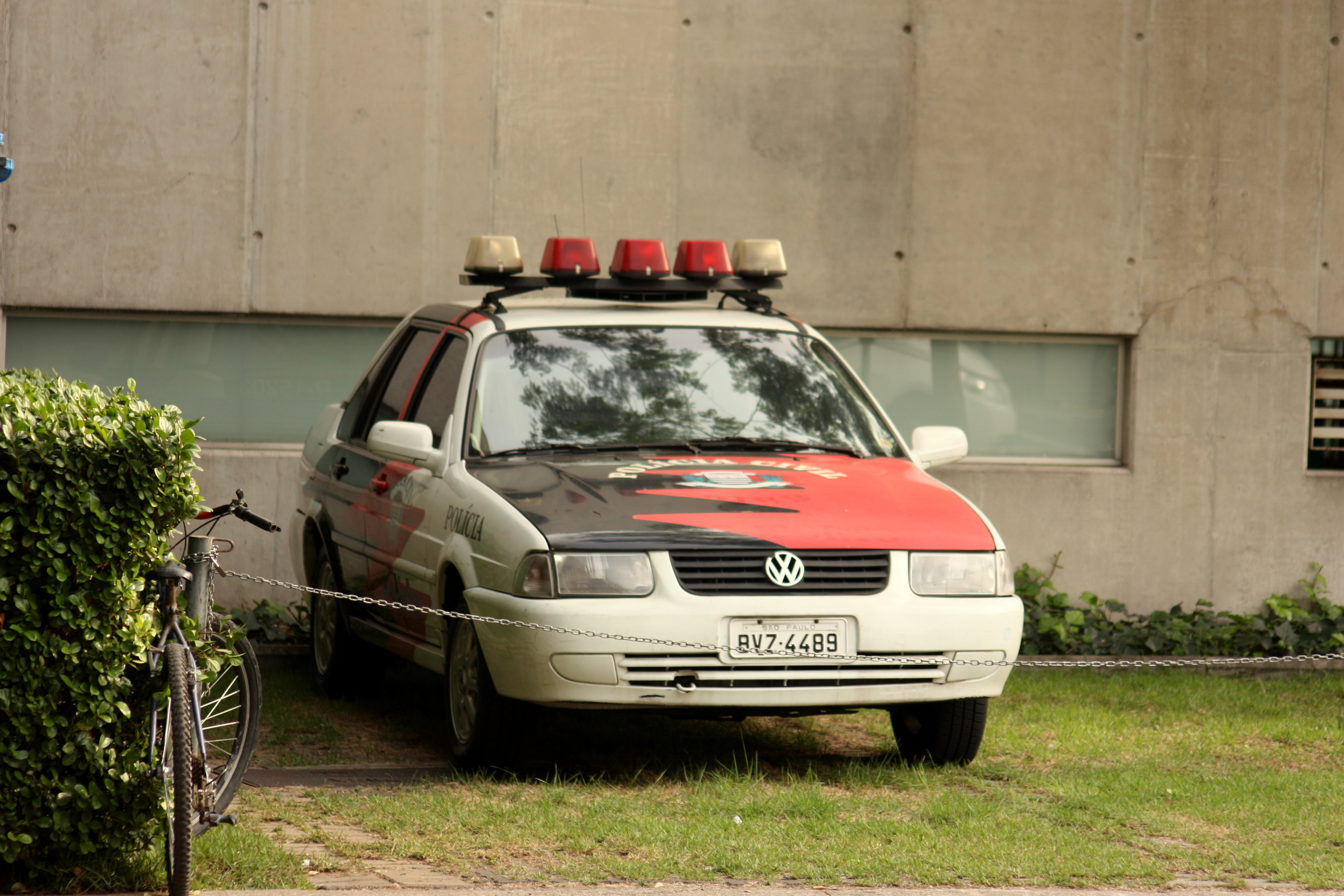
Facelifted Volkswagen Santana 2000 used as police car in São Paulo state

It received a mild facelift for 1994, and another more extensive one in 1999. In 2002, the Quantum was taken out of production, and then, after more than two decades and years of dropping sales, the Santana was retired from the range in June 2006. It sold 548,494 units during its 22 year production run.

In the 1990s, a pick-up truck version of the VW Santana was built using the bed of the Volkswagen Taro, but it did not enter production.

== Corsar (Mexico; 1984–1988) ==
Volkswagen Corsar (Mexico)
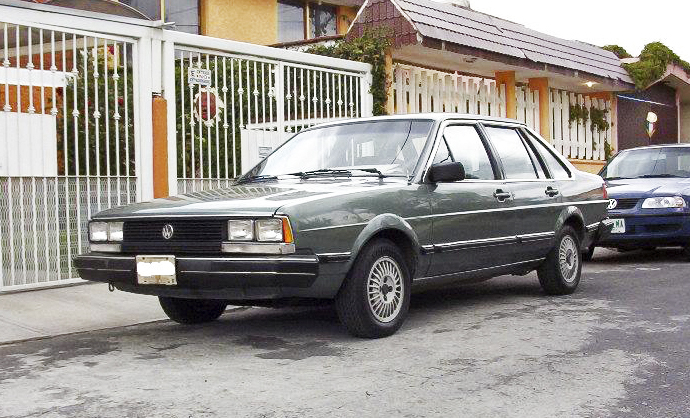
- 1984 Volkswagen Corsar CD (sedan)

Overview
- Manufacturer: Volkswagen
- Production: 1984–1988
- Assembly: Mexico: Puebla

Body and chassis
- Class: Mid-size car
- Body style: 4-door saloon 5-door Variant
- Platform: Volkswagen Group B2 platform
- Related: Volkswagen Passat (B2)

Powertrain
- Engine: 1.8 L I4
- Transmission: 4/5-speed manual 3-speed automatic

The Santana was launched to the Mexican car market in February 1984 as the all-new Corsar CD. Assembled at VW Mexico's Puebla factory mostly with German-sourced components, for the brand it was intended to be the top-of-range offer for the domestic car market at the time, a mechanically reliable while slightly luxurious medium sedan. The 1.8-litre 85 hp (63 kW) carbureted engine was the only drive choice for the whole Corsar lineup through its lifetime. It was definitely a high fuel-saving option toward its local medium-luxury competitors: Chrysler LeBaron "K", Chevrolet Celebrity, Ford Grand Marquis, Renault 18.

In 1984 and 1985, the Corsar was marketed only as 4-door sedan, the same European Santana body (no Passat Variant body was offered here for those first years), matching the appearance of the US's market version (badged there as VW Quantum). At the time, the Corsar and Quantum sedans shared the same front grille design, featuring four squared headlight units (two beams for the right and left sides with amber colored rectangular emergency indicators below each) rather than the Santana's grille design.

Regarding equipment, only one trim level was available, which included: 13-inch alloy wheels, 185/70 tires, velour upholstery (gray or blue coloured starting in 1985), rear seat headrests, AM/FM stereo cassette Radio with four speakers, tachometer, power steering, anti-theft alarm. Air condition was available as an option, as well as 4-speed manual transmission or 3-speed automatic gearboxes. The following colours were available for 1984: Mars Red, Alpine White, Jade Green Metallic, Cosmos Silver Metallic and Graphite Metallic.

For 1986, the Corsar's product range received several novelties, somewhat similar to the North-American Quantum line. First, the headlights and front grille design was updated to match the same featured by the correspondent European Passat line. New body colours and upholstery types were now offered, a new 5-speed manual gearbox replaced the previous 4-speed one. Some new features were now available as option equipment, mainly power door locks and windows and black leather upholstery. In March 1986, the Passat wagon body was now offered within the local lineup, being badged here as Corsar Variant (matching the European Passat Variant or Quantum Wagon, as known in United States and Brazil).

The 1987 and 1988 Corsar lineup remained mostly unchanged, just bringing out then that the alloy wheels where now offered as part of the option package, with a set of steel-made wheels wearing full covers being now the standard ones.

By mid-1988, a limited edition Corsar was released (both sedan and Variant version). It was distinguished for its Black and Silver double-tone paintwork, black leather upholstery and full equipment. Finally, by the end of 1988, the Corsar was discontinued from Volkswagen Mexico lineup, since production of its German counterpart had stopped in Europe after the introduction of the next-generation Passat. Most of the parts had been imported from Germany. Also, the local assembly lines were needed to increase production of the Mk2 Golf/Jetta for United States and Canada exports.

== Carat (Argentina; 1987–1991) ==
Volkswagen Carat (Argentina)

Overview
- Manufacturer: Volkswagen
- Also called: Ford Galaxy
- Production: 1987–1991
- Assembly: Argentina: General Pacheco

Body and chassis
- Class: Mid-size car
- Body style: 4-door sedan
- Platform: Volkswagen Group B2 platform
- Related: Volkswagen Passat (B2)

Powertrain
- Engine: 1.8 L EA827 I4 (petrol); 2.0 L EA827 I4 (petrol)
- Transmission: 5-speed manual

Dimensions
- Wheelbase: 2,550 mm (100.4 in)
- Length: 4,527 mm (178.2 in)
- Width: 1,708 mm (67.2 in)
- Height: 1,395 mm (54.9 in)

The Santana 4-door sedan started production in Argentina in June, 1987 as the Carat, manufactured by Volkswagen Argentina S.A. (San Justo/General Pacheco, Buenos Aires Province). No 2-door or estate versions were produced. Production ended in 1991.
