= Koreyt-e Borumi =

Village in Khuzestan province, Iran

Koreyt-e Borumi Persian: کریت برومی
- Village
- Location within Iran
- Coordinates: 31°16′49″N 48°49′09″E
- Country: Iran
- Province: Khuzestan
- County: Ahvaz
- District: Gheyzaniyeh
- Rural District: Mosharrahat

Population (2016)
  - Total: 1,622
- Time zone: UTC+3:30 (IRST)

Koreyt-e Borumi (Persian: کریت برومی) (Note: Also romanized as Koreyt-e Borūmī; also known as Karet, Koreyt, Koreyt-e Do, and Qarait) is a village in Mosharrahat Rural District of Gheyzaniyeh District, Ahvaz County, Khuestan province, Iran.

== Demographics ==
=== Population ===
At the time of the 2006 National Census, the village's population was 2,185 in 432 households, when it was in the Central District. The following census in 2011 counted 1,961 people in 480 households. The 2016 census measured the population of the village as 1,622 in 418 households, by which time the rural district had been separated from the district in the formation of Gheyzaniyeh District.
