= Carrot head =

Carrot head may refer to:

- a person with red hair (this usage is pejorative)
- the greens of carrots, when used as food
- the fictional character Mr. Carrot Head, a spoof of Mr. Potato Head

== See also ==
- Poil de carotte (English: Carrot Head), a French short story
- Carrot top (disambiguation)
