= Carrot (disambiguation) =

A carrot is a vegetable.

Carrot may also refer to:

== Art and entertainment ==
- "Carrots" (song), a single by Panda Bear
- Carrot Glacé, a protagonist of the manga Sorcerer Hunters
- Carrots, a 2019 EP by Bish included within Carrots and Sticks
- Carrots (Pillow Pal), a Pillow Pal bunny made by Ty, Inc.
- Captain Carrot, a DC Comics superhero
- Carrot Ironfoundersson, a fictional character from the Discworld series
- Carrot Top, born Scott Thompson (1965), American actor and comedian
- “Carrots”, an episode of The Good Doctor

== Computing ==
- Carrot^{2}, a search results clustering engine and open source project
- Carrot Rewards, a personal health mobile app for residents in three Canadian provinces

== Other uses ==
- Carrot and stick, combination of reward and punishment to induce a behavior
- Camberwell carrot, a slang term for a large cannabis joint
- Wild carrot, a flowering plant also known as Queen Anne's lace which the vegetable is a subspecies of

== See also ==
- Carrot River (disambiguation), Saskatchewan, Canada
- Carrott, surname of multiple people
- Carat (disambiguation)
- Caret (disambiguation)
- Karat (disambiguation)
