= Carrott =

Carrott is the surname of:

- Bradley Carrott, Antiguan politician
- Bryan Carrott, American jazz musician
- Jasper Carrott (b. 1945), English comedian and television personality
- Josh Carrott, English YouTuber also known as Korean Englishman
- Peggy Carrott, competitor at the 1961 Women's British Open Squash Championship
- Ric Carrott (b. 1949), American television and movie actor

== See also ==
- Carrot (disambiguation)
