= Carrot top =

Carrot top may refer to:

== Relating to people and persons ==
- A generally disparaging term for someone with red hair (see: Discrimination against people with red hair)
- William Wells (soldier) (1770 – 1812), United States Army officer
- Carrot Top, stage name of American comedian Scott Thompson
- Carrot Topp, the lead singer for comedy punk band The Radioactive Chicken Heads

== Other uses ==
- carrot greens, the top of a carrot
- Poil de carotte (English: Carrot Top), 1894 short story by Jules Renard

== See also ==
- parsley, the greens of a carrot-relative, parsley-root vegetable
- Carrot (disambiguation)
- Top (disambiguation)
