= Carrot River =

Carrot River may refer to:

- Carrot River (Saskatchewan), a river in Western Canada
- Carrot River, Saskatchewan, a town in Saskatchewan, Canada
- Carrot River 29A, an Indian reserve in Saskatchewan, Canada
- Carrot River Valley, a provincial electoral district in Saskatchewan, Canada.
