= List of The Good Doctor episodes =

The Good Doctor is an American medical drama television series developed for ABC by David Shore, based on the South Korean series of the same name. The series is produced by Sony Pictures Television and ABC Studios, with Shore serving as showrunner. The series stars Freddie Highmore as Shaun Murphy, a young autistic surgical resident with savant syndrome, alongside Nicholas Gonzalez, Antonia Thomas, Chuku Modu, Beau Garrett, Hill Harper, Richard Schiff, and Tamlyn Tomita. Will Yun Lee, Fiona Gubelmann, Christina Chang, Paige Spara, Jasika Nicole, Bria Samoné Henderson, Noah Galvin, Osvaldo Benavides, and Brandon Larracuente joined the principal cast in later seasons. The series premiered on September 25, 2017.

In April 2023, ABC renewed the series for a seventh season which premiered on February 20, 2024. On January 11, 2024, ABC announced that the series would not be renewed for another season, thus making season seven the final season of the series.

During the course of the series, 126 episodes of The Good Doctor aired over seven seasons, between September 25, 2017, and May 21, 2024.

== Series overview ==
Season	Episodes	Originally released		Rank	Average viewership (in millions)
Season	Episodes	First released	Last released	Rank	Average viewership (in millions)
1	18	September 25, 2017	March 26, 2018	7	15.61
2	18	September 24, 2018	March 11, 2019	12	12.20
3	20	September 23, 2019	March 30, 2020	11	10.82
4	20	November 2, 2020	June 7, 2021	19	8.16
5	18	September 27, 2021	May 16, 2022	27	7.05
6	22	October 3, 2022	May 1, 2023	30	6.24
7	10	February 20, 2024	May 21, 2024	41	5.11

== Episodes ==
=== Season 1 (2017–18) ===
No. overall	No. in season	Title	Directed by	Written by	Original release date	Prod. code	U.S. viewers (millions)
1	1	"Burnt Food"	Seth Gordon	David Shore	September 25, 2017	100	11.22
On the way to begin his surgical residency at San Jose St. Bonaventure Hospital, Dr. Shaun Murphy witnesses an airport sign fall and shatter glass onto a young boy. With his unique ability to visualize the internal body and using improvised methods and tools, Shaun is able to stabilize the boy. In a hospital board meeting, Dr. Aaron Glassman, president of the hospital, tries to convince the board to hire Shaun, despite his autism. Throughout the episode, flashbacks are shown, revealing Shaun's childhood and his motivation for becoming a doctor.
2	2	"Mount Rushmore"	Mike Listo	David Shore	October 2, 2017	101	10.93
Dr. Neil Melendez is doing rounds with Dr. Claire Browne and Dr. Jared Kalu. Melendez calls out Shaun for arriving late on his first full day. A middle aged woman is brought into the ER with abdominal pain. Shaun immediately diagnoses a malignant tumor. As punishment for lateness, Shaun is assigned 'scut work,' where his attention to detail gets him in trouble. After rechecking a discharged young girl's test results, Shaun races to her home, annoying her parents over the late hour but eventually saving the girl's life. Additionally, Shaun's idea saves the cancer patient's life, but Jared presents the idea as his own and takes all of the credit. Afterwards, Andrews stands up for Shaun and forces Melendez to put Shaun back on the team.
3	3	"Oliver"	John Dahl	William Rotko	October 9, 2017	102	10.69
Shaun and Claire fly to San Francisco Municipal Hospital to get a liver for a transplant patient. After learning the helicopter can't take off due to bad weather, they resort to a police escort. During this, Claire learns to communicate with Shaun, bonding with him in the process. Meanwhile, at St. Bonaventure, Chuck, the recipient of the liver, is discovered to have alcohol in his system, a development that could void his transplant eligibility. Chuck later confesses he had one drink at his daughter's graduation. In order to protect its reputation and ability to supply transplants to future patients, the hospital denies Chuck the liver. Shaun and Claire arrive back, having kept the liver viable, only to learn that it is to be taken to a patient at another hospital. Elsewhere, Shaun meets Lea, a female neighbor at his apartment complex.
4	4	"Pipes"	Steven DePaul	Thomas L. Moran	October 16, 2017	103	10.60
Barb Allen, 22 weeks pregnant, and her husband arrive at St. Bonaventure, hoping the doctors can save their baby. A large non-cancerous tumor is growing on the fetus and must be removed in order to save his life. Despite the serious risks both to her and the baby, Barb insists on surgery. Meanwhile, Shaun and Claire are assigned a patient, Olivia, who has a boil in her genital area. However, when doctors attempt to drain it, a fibroid tumor is found to be wrapped around a nerve. The surgery to remove it will cut off all feeling in Olivia's genitals. Shaun comes up with a solution that allows her to keep feeling in her genital area.
5	5	"Point Three Percent"	Larry Teng	David Hoselton	October 23, 2017	104	10.39
Shaun notices a young boy, Evan, who has an uncanny resemblance to his deceased brother Steve. Evan was brought to the hospital by his parents for a possible fracture to his arm. However, it is discovered that he is actually suffering from terminal bone cancer, a fact his parents have kept hidden from him. Shaun attempts to find another diagnosis and save Evan, earning him the scorn of his colleagues. Evan's terminal cancer diagnosis is ultimately confirmed with the revelation that it has metastasized into his chest cavity. However, Evan reveals that he has secretly known the truth for a long time and accepts his situation, but is thankful for Shaun's attempts to help him. Meanwhile, the other members of the team try to diagnose an older man, brought in by his estranged son, with a severe allergy causing him to convulse violently. Claire and Jared determine that the man is suffering from cystic tapeworms located in his skull. A successful surgery is performed by Dr. Glassman.
6	6	"Not Fake"	Michael Patrick Jann	Simran Baidwan	October 30, 2017	105	10.60
Shaun and the rest of the residents are working the graveyard shift when numerous casualties from a wedding bus crash arrive. Among the victims is a woman with severe visible burns on whom Jared tries an experimental procedure and a young man with a severely damaged leg. Tensions arise between the patient's parents and fiancée over the best choice for treatment; his parents want to amputate the leg, but his fiancée is in favor of an experimental bone-replacement procedure. Due to Jessica filing an injunction, a judge is left to make the decision and, after hearing all sides, goes with the bone-replacement. Melendez and Shaun are able to save the man's leg and, though he will have a long recovery, he is expected to be fine. After treating a patient, Claire realizes that a woman has been left behind at the crash site. Claire and Glassman successfully treat the woman for a brain bleed, but discover afterwards that she is mysteriously brain dead. Glassman later realizes that Claire improperly intubated the patient at the crash site, causing hypoxia and leading to her brain death.
7	7	"22 Steps"	David Straiton	Johanna Lee	November 13, 2017	106	10.14
Shaun encounters Liam, an autistic patient, when he is admitted to the hospital. Having to face prejudice from the young man's parents, Melendez defends Shaun for the first time and acknowledges his exceptional abilities. After Liam voices his support for Shaun doing the surgery, his parents allow it. Melendez allows Shaun to take a more active role in the surgery and Shaun saves Liam's life during a dangerous part of it. In the aftermath, Shaun helps Liam's parents to see how their overbearing and overprotective nature towards their son led to him getting sick in the first place. As a result, Liam's parents start asking Liam for his opinion on things rather than unilaterally making decisions for him. On Glassman's directive, Claire continues with therapy sessions in order to curb her guilt over inadvertently causing the death of a patient. Jared treats a 73-year-old man with severe chest pains who needs urgent medical attention and a pacemaker, but the patient states his desire is to die. Ultimately, Jared chooses to honor the man's wishes, but stays with him as he dies. Afterwards, Jared and Claire comfort each other over the loss of their respective patients.
8	8	"Apple"	Néstor Carbonell	David Renaud	November 20, 2017	107	9.97
A robbery takes place while Shaun is shopping at a grocery store for apples. With Shaun's communication limitations, he puts the lives of two customers on a first date at risk, leading to a young woman getting shot. Shaun's neighbor Lea hugs him after he admits that he made a mistake and got someone hurt; though he doesn't hug back, he is shown to relax in her embrace. During surgery, Lim questions Claire's ability to not let her emotions get the better of her because of a racist patient, the shooter in the robbery. This leads to an argument between the two, with Lim ordering Claire to leave the operating room. Claire puts her emotions in check to save the life of the racist patient, then makes amends with Lim.
9	9	"Intangibles"	Bronwen Hughes	Karen Struck	November 27, 2017	108	9.25
The team takes on the case of a young boy from the Congo who has severe congenital heart anomalies. Working together, Shaun and Melendez devise a procedure to treat the boy; despite difficulties, it is ultimately successful. Shaun's latest encounter with his neighbor Lea has him confused. He takes flirting lessons from Claire, noting and charting what he sees in regards to the "flirting trifecta." Meanwhile, Claire, along with Dr. Carly Lever, searches for a misplaced tissue sample from a woman with possible throat cancer. At the last minute, Claire finds the sample in a mislabeled container and the patient turns out to be cancer free.
10	10	"Sacrifice"	Michael Patrick Jann	Lloyd Gilyard Jr.	December 4, 2017	109	9.03
Shaun reluctantly agrees to Dr. Glassman's repeated suggestions to meet with a therapist, but ultimately changes his mind after a new patient, Bobby Ato, convinces Shaun to stop letting people tell him what to do. Claire runs into an uncomfortable situation when Dr. Matt Coyle makes unwanted sexual advances toward her during a patient consultation. Jared finds out and physically threatens him. As a result, Jared is fired. After a tense dinner with her father and Dr. Melendez, Jessica states that she doesn't want to have children.
11	11	"Islands Part One"	Bill D'Elia	Thomas L. Moran & William Rotko	January 8, 2018	110	8.30
Shaun and Lea embark on an impromptu road trip. Shaun experiences many firsts: driving, drinking tequila, singing karaoke, and even his first kiss with Lea. However, during the trip, Lea states her intention to move home to Hershey, Pennsylvania, which devastates Shaun. Melendez and Andrews operate on conjoined twins, one of whom needs a kidney. Complications develop and the operation to separate them, planned for six months after the kidney surgery, must be done immediately. The operation goes well until it's discovered the twins have not awakened from the surgery. Melendez decides it's more important to be with Jessica and that he can be a father in other ways.
12	12	"Islands Part Two"	Cherie Nowlan	Thomas L. Moran & William Rotko	January 15, 2018	111	9.33
Shaun returns to the hospital after his trip and gives Dr. Glassman his two weeks' notice, intending to move to Hershey to be with Lea. The twins suffer complications from their surgery; Katie is not getting enough blood flow to the brain and Jenny's heart is failing. Despite the doctors' best efforts to save both twins, Jenny dies on the operating table. After allegations of racism by Kalu's lawyer, Jessica is forced to look into previous misconduct incidents at the hospital in which white doctors were only warned instead of fired; as a result, Jared is reinstated. When he returns to work, he is met with the cold shoulder by Andrews, who tells him he sets civil rights back when he looks for racism where there is none. Jessica tells Melendez that she wants to break up because she feels like she is standing in the way of his being a father.
13	13	"Seven Reasons"	Mike Listo	David Shore & David Hoselton	January 22, 2018	112	9.61
While treating a Muslim patient, Shaun senses she is lying and makes controversial claims about how she sustained her injuries. Melendez punctures the bronchus of the patient during surgery and is put under investigation after Shaun questions if his personal life is affecting his work. While Claire assists in Dr. Lim's surgery on a stroke patient who had an aneurysm, she learns that Coyle got a new job and a raise. They inform the patient's wife that he needs surgery or he will die, but she refuses to consent until Claire explains the reality of the situation. Shaun asks Glassman to be friends, but Glassman decides to give him his own space and not be his friend, which upsets Shaun.
14	14	"She"	Seth Gordon	Simran Baidwan	February 5, 2018	113	9.63
The four residents, including the new Dr. Morgan Reznick, are paired off in competition: Reznick and Browne with Melendez, Murphy and Kalu with Lim. Murphy and Kalu are faced with a transgender patient, Quinn, which leads to friction from Murphy's lack of experience and understanding relating to transgender people. Murphy and Kalu determine that she has testicular cancer. Browne and Reznick tend to a male patient that has contracted a superbug resistant to all medication as a result of taking leftover prescription medication for the wrong purposes. Drs. Andrews and Barnes see a fertility specialist, as they are having trouble conceiving.
15	15	"Heartfelt"	Regina King	Thomas L. Moran & Johanna Lee	February 26, 2018	114	7.82
A female teen goes through a risky surgery to implant a sternum so she can live a normal life without being confined to her house. A young boy initially rejects the idea of having a convicted killer's liver transplanted in him but, without it, he has a day to live. A former 15 year veteran cop-turned-doctor, Alex Park, is skeptical of the convict, Boris', motives. Allegra talks to Dr. Andrews about a young wealthy donor, Aidan Coulter, but Andrews says being involved with him might give people the wrong idea that she used sex to solicit donations. At a fundraiser, Jared tells Claire he loved her and thought maybe she would one day love him, but came to the realization that wasn't true, leaving the status of their relationship unknown.
16	16	"Pain"	Allison Liddi-Brown	William L. Rotko & David Renaud	March 12, 2018	115	9.88
Shaun, Claire, and Alex assist Melendez with one of his first patients, a man named Hunter who was paralyzed in a motorcycle accident ten years prior. Jared, Morgan, and Andrews attend to a patient with an infection caused by plastic surgery. Claire's estranged mother shows up at the hospital saying she wants to reconnect but, in reality, she takes advantage of Claire once again. Andrews sees an infertility specialist that tells him there is a surgery that could help him with his sperm count, but with a risk of impotence. Alex does a background check on Kenny which sheds light on his criminal past, leading him to suggest Shaun is being used by him.
17	17	"Smile"	Bill D'Elia	David Hoselton & Karen Struck	March 19, 2018	116	9.03
Shaun and Alex treat teenaged Gretchen's Möbius syndrome, enabling her to smile; Andrews persuades an insurance executive to cover the surgery. After Gretchen fails to wake up, it is believed that she has become brain dead, but Park realizes that a rare condition is causing her to remain under anesthesia and she recovers. Morgan and Claire's patient, "Lucy Callard," is actually an identity thief who let her insurance lapse to pay her son's college tuition and failed to fill her post-operative antibiotic prescription due to fear of discovery, resulting in a post-op infection. Morgan convinces the real Lucy Callard, a painkiller addict, to enter rehab; Claire gains the trust of the imposter, Beatrice, who dies after her infection turns into sepsis that fails to respond to treatment. Jared romantically pursues his burn-victim patient, Celez, after she completes her treatment; he is also offered a job in Denver. Kenny takes advantage of Shaun. Shaun urges Glassman to date hospital barista Debbie; they hit it off over their interest in classic cars, but Glassman suddenly experiences aphasia at the end of their dinner date.
18	18	"More"	Mike Listo	David Shore & Lloyd Gilyard, Jr.	March 26, 2018	117	9.52
Glassman tells Shaun about his inoperable glioma and that he has 18 months left to live. He accepts his death, but agrees to additional imaging for Shaun's sake; this yields a worse prognosis of four months to live. Glassman takes Shaun to a park his late daughter loved so they can enjoy the time Glassman has left. Shaun determines how a minimally invasive biopsy could be performed, which later proves that Glassman's cancer is operable and, though it'd be a long road to recovery, he'll most likely survive. A patient, Caden, suffers complications after treatment for a fraternity hazing injury. Jared and Alex question Caden's friend, but Jared is put off by Alex's distrustful nature. Shaun determines that he erred in clamping Caden's artery, offering to take full responsibility for it. He proposes a risky procedure as a fix and Melendez decides they should perform it together. Caden survives and Melendez invites the team out for drinks, which Morgan finds perverse; Melendez hopes a doctor supports her when she inevitably kills a patient. Shaun decides to admit his mistake to Andrews, though Glassman's position would be at stake; Glassman leaves the decision up to Shaun and accompanies him to meet with Andrews.

=== Season 2 (2018–19) ===
No. overall	No. in season	Title	Directed by	Written by	Original release date	Prod. code	U.S. viewers (millions)
19	1	"Hello"	Mike Listo	Freddie Highmore	September 24, 2018	201	7.35
In performance reviews, Andrews, now president of the hospital, tells Shaun to learn to communicate, Claire to be more assertive, and Morgan to improve her teamwork. Jared, working his last day before moving to Denver, skips his. Jared and Shaun run a mobile clinic and meet Harry, a mentally unstable homeless man. When Shaun takes Jared's advice to spend time with Glassman, who is beginning his cancer treatment with Dr. Blaize (his last hire before being replaced), it leads Shaun to diagnose Harry with a brain tumor. Shaun has a communication breakthrough in persuading Harry (whose real name is Edward) to receive treatment, which is successful and enables him to reunite with his family. Shaun commits to standing by Glassman through his treatment. Andrews, following Allegra's advice that Glassman was manipulative, persuades Melendez to perform a risky heart surgery that could raise the hospital's public profile. Claire resolves a complication and Morgan encourages her to take credit. The procedure is a success and Claire acknowledges her innovation. Claire has a change of heart and asks Jared to stay, but he tells her they will both be happy apart before leaving for Denver. Lea unexpectedly greets Shaun outside his apartment.
20	2	"Middle Ground"	Steve Robin	David Shore	October 1, 2018	202	7.18
Shaun and Claire assist Dr. Melendez in treating Paul, a hospital janitor Shaun has diagnosed with pancreatic cancer and one year to live. Paul's wife and adult children encourage him to have risky surgery; Paul agrees, telling Shaun he wants to please his family and advising Shaun to lie when the truth is unhelpful. Paul dies from a complication and his family begins to squabble over having coerced Paul; Shaun lies, telling them that Paul wanted the surgery. Dr. Lim treats Mara, a sixteen-year-old girl with scarring from female genital mutilation, risking liability in willfully ignoring Mara's fake ID. Mara experiences extreme pain, revealing live tissue; with her parents and Child Protective Services involved, Mara declines reconstruction in favor of clitoridectomy, but Lim performs the reconstruction without consent. Mara is apparently pleased with the result and Lim's discretion. Dr. Glassman delays picking a neurosurgeon, fearing he could survive but suffer permanent disability; at Dr. Blaize's insistence, Glassman undergoes surgery. Shaun avoids his houseguest Lea for days, telling Claire he doesn't understand his own feelings. He tells Lea she hurt him and he wants her to leave before she hurts him again.
21	3	"36 Hours"	Larry Teng	Thomas L. Moran	October 8, 2018	203	7.18
On 36-hour shifts, Shaun and Morgan manage the emergency room in Dr. Lim's absence while Claire and Alex assist Dr. Melendez. Melendez performs surgery to treat a woman's endometriosis and restore her fertility. Her condition is more severe than realized and the planned hour-long surgery stretches to over 22 hours; tensions rise among Melendez, Claire, and Nurse Flores. When a risky procedure is the only way to avoid a hysterectomy, the patient's husband refuses to make a decision. He cedes the responsibility to Claire, who overrides Melendez's decision; they perform the hysterectomy. Called before Dr. Andrews over their bickering, Melendez, Claire, and Flores have only praise for each other. Shaun and Morgan safely extract a light bulb from a child's mouth and treat a young man whose priapism reveals an abscess. In traffic court, Lim fails to get a ticket dismissed and is jailed for contempt of court; she is later called away to operate on the abscess, interrupting a tryst with the prosecutor. Shaun apologizes to Lea, but she criticizes him for hurting her and failing to reciprocate her friendship. Glassman wakes from his successful surgery and has a vision of his dead daughter, Maddie.
22	4	"Tough Titmouse"	Steven DePaul	David Hoselton	October 15, 2018	204	6.68
Mac, a boy with fragile X syndrome, injures himself and his mother, Nicole. Alex and Shaun believe Nicole should send Mac to a group home; at Melendez's recommendation, Nicole agrees. Shaun recalls living with a tough-loving foster mother who became terminally ill. Dr. Lim, Claire, and Morgan treat injured 18-year-old female free solo climber Kitty; her parents, disapproving a risky surgery that could preserve Kitty's athleticism, obtain a declaration of medical incompetence and authorize a safer procedure that may leave her disabled. Kitty disowns her parents; Claire tries to reconcile them, but nobody changes their decision. Claire and Melendez discuss how their baggage influences their advice. Claire struggled with her irresponsible mother and Melendez's developmentally challenged sister Gabi lives in a care home. Glassman's daughter Maddie, who became a heavy marijuana user as a teen, died when Glassman locked her out at night as punishment; Glassman has an emotional confrontation with the hallucination of Maddie and they confirm their mutual love. Shaun struggles to make amends with Lea, succeeding only when he asks what happened in Hershey. Lea is stunned to learn Shaun has rented a two-bedroom apartment for them to share.
23	5	"Carrots"	Sharat Raju	Liz Friedman	October 29, 2018	205	6.79
Dr. Brown administers a Precordial thump. Dr. Lim treats Wade who, due to Crohn's disease and a fistula, must have his gastric bypass reversed. Wade keeps his past obesity secret from his husband, Spencer. Divorcées Alex and Lim disagree over marital honesty; Alex considers it more important. Wade tells Spencer he kept the secret because Spencer mocked their overweight friends. Spencer admits to Alex his unease at knowing Wade could regain the weight. Dr. Melendez treats Louisa, a mother with anorexia and mitral regurgitation; her mental illness prevents the weight gain she needs before surgery. Melendez wants to operate despite the risks, rejecting Claire's suggestion of deep brain stimulation (DBS); she presents the option to Louisa, who requests it. Melendez is the review board's deciding vote for DBS, but he removes Claire from his team for not accepting his decision while telling her it was Andrews who voted against her. After DBS, Louisa wants to eat, but feels less bonded to her son, a risk she understood and accepted. Glassman is too self-conscious to attempt walking until Shaun brings Debbie to convince him, making Shaun doubt his importance to Glassman. Shaun and Lea talk through her fear that living together will damage their platonic friendship; she ultimately agrees to move into the new apartment with him.
24	6	"Two-Ply (or Not Two-Ply)"	Tara Nicole Weyr	Simran Baidwan	November 5, 2018	206	6.53
Now working with Dr. Lim, Claire treats a teenage girl, Riley, for severe respiratory problems. Riley's parents believe she is making herself sick over their divorce, but Claire suspects a tumor. When Riley's condition worsens, Claire convinces her parents to allow exploratory surgery; Park initially doubts Claire, but ultimately helps her. They discover and remove an inhaled Lego from Riley's lung; her years-long illness was an immune response to the foreign object. Shaun and Morgan disagree over treating Jas, a violinist: Shaun believes she has flesh-eating bacteria which Morgan, a former archer, is reluctant to test for since, if wrong, it could ruin Jas' career. Morgan's hesitation leads to them being forced to amputate Jas' arm when her condition worsens. Melendez advises Morgan, devastated by her mistake, that she and Shaun have different strengths, as did he and Dr. Lim during their residency. Debbie helps Glassman recover at home, but he asks her to leave after he is injured when they attempt intimacy. Shaun and Lea struggle as new roommates. Glassman tells Lea, if she can't be Shaun's roommate, she should move out immediately; to Shaun's delight, Lea commits to resolving their conflicts and sharing the apartment.
25	7	"Hubert"	Marisol Adler	David Renaud	November 12, 2018	207	6.53
Claire's college roommate Kayla has terminal ovarian cancer; Claire persuades Dr. Melendez to perform a pain-relief procedure and a life-extending treatment option emerges. At Kayla's insistence, Claire works on Melendez's team with Alex. Kayla asks her husband Dash and Claire to date if she dies, sending them to dinner together. Kayla wants Dash to be taken care of and Claire to open her heart. Claire accuses Kayla of being controlling; during the second procedure, Claire resolves a complication. Claire and Kayla make peace; Claire urges Kayla to focus on herself. Claire and Melendez commend each other, but agree to not work directly together. Dr. Lim, Shaun, and Morgan treat Santiago, who needs a kidney transplant. His perfect-match brother, Armando, will donate only if Santiago sells the family business, granting Armando economic freedom. Shaun leads the brothers to discuss their father's legacy. Armando donates the kidney condition-free, improving their relationship. Dr. Glassman suffers a memory lapse. Shaun and Lea's new fish Hubert dies; Lea is reminded of the failure of her professional and personal relationship with her brother in Hershey. Shaun comforts Lea by proving that Hubert died of a parasite unrelated to her caretaking; they get a new fish.
26	8	"Stories"	Michael Patrick Jann	Sal Calleros	November 19, 2018	208	6.84
Morgan and Park treat Finn, whose parents don't believe in vaccines. Finn has diastematomyelia, a congenitally split spinal cord. During Finn's treatment, his mother Bethany allows Park to vaccinate him. Finn is treated successfully, but Bethany acted without her husband's knowledge, threatening their marriage. In a failed effort to reconcile them, Park emotionally tells the husband a story (which Park later claims is untrue) of a family that fractured when a couple failed to address the wife's dishonesty. Shaun and Claire treat Todd and Dawn, a couple whose car crashed. Dawn's miscarried ectopic pregnancy reveals her infidelity, as Todd had a vasectomy. Claire determines a tumor has eliminated Dawn's inhibitions; it is removed, but Todd only forgives Dawn after Claire points out that, despite acting on every impulse, Dawn never left him, showing she truly loves Todd. With Claire looking for other jobs, Dr. Andrews tells Melendez Claire's departure would endanger Melendez's promotion. So Melendez can avoid choosing between disobeying orders and looking weak, Claire extends an openly insincere apology; he restores her to his team. At Dr. Glassman's request, Shaun privately tests his memory. Glassman cannot remember Shaun's brother's name, confirming the lapses.
27	9	"Empathy"	Joanna Kerns	Karen Struck	November 26, 2018	209	6.67
Claire and Morgan treat George, a pedophile who has never acted upon his urges. The hormones that suppress his urges have caused a stroke; he must discontinue them. He mutilates his scrotum and asks the doctors to castrate him. Claire and Morgan eventually agree, but they and Dr. Melendez must instead repair his testicles to prevent unsurvivably low testosterone. George commits suicide; Morgan suggests the outcome is satisfactory. Alex and Shaun treat Billy, a severely beaten juvenile offender. Alex wants to repair an old dent in Billy's forehead, caused by his father's abuse, which led to the beatings; Dr. Lim initially opposes the unnecessary cosmetic procedure, but accepts Shaun's simplified approach. Shaun rejects Billy's praise because Billy suffered a dangerous complication. Alex reveals Billy had been planning suicide; Shaun saved Billy's life and exhibited empathy, an area Shaun considers a deficiency. Allegra demands Andrews choose a new Chief of Surgery. After initially considering between Melendez and Lim, Andrews ultimately retains the title himself; Melendez and Lim later agree to be allies instead of competitors. Shaun takes away Glassman's driver's license. Lea teaches Shaun to drive, using flawed but effective surgical metaphors, so Shaun can transport Glassman.
28	10	"Quarantine"	Mike Listo	Liz Friedman & Lloyd Gilyard Jr.	December 3, 2018	210	6.12
After sleeping together, Drs. Lim and Melendez agree not to do so again despite both having enjoyed it. The ER and its waiting room are quarantined after two patients, travelers returning from Malaysia, die of a viral respiratory disease. Those quarantined include Shaun, Morgan, Lim, and Alex's estranged son Kellan. Morgan treats Tyler, an infected EMT with whom she shares a developing romance; Tyler dies despite Morgan's impassioned efforts. Lim gets infected and isolates herself. Mall Santa Pete's bowel obstruction requires surgery without the benefit of standard equipment; Lim collapses while talking Morgan through a vital part of the surgery. Shaun also collapses, overwhelmed by sensory overload. Kellan suffers an asthma attack, causing panic when patients think he is infected with the virus. Elsewhere in the hospital, Melendez and Claire struggle to keep leukemia patient Chris alive. Chris' marrow donor, his estranged father Bob, is trapped in quarantine; Chris flatlines and Melendez & Claire struggle to revive him despite Chris' DNR. With Shaun unavailable, Lea takes Dr. Glassman for an MRI to check on the status of his cancer; his tumor is confirmed to have returned.
29	11	"Quarantine Part Two"	Mike Listo	Simran Baidwan & Mark Rozeman	January 14, 2019	211	6.26
Morgan revives Shaun by getting him to focus on Santa Pete's condition; with Shaun's help, Morgan successfully completes the surgery. Melendez and Claire revive their patient and devise a way to perform the bone marrow transplant with Andrews' help. Park breaks quarantine to treat Kellan's asthma attack and extracts Bob's bone marrow with the help of retired veterinarian Esther; the transplant is a success, but Bob dies of complications. Esther later conveys Bob's final regrets to his son. Morgan treats Doctor Lim using extracorporeal membrane oxygenation, which proves successful. Morgan realizes that Tyler's ripped mask led to him getting sick, so the virus is not airborne; no one else contracts the virus and quarantine is later lifted. Pregnant Viola suffers complications, forcing Shaun to perform a C-section. With the help of Kellan, Shaun saves both mother and child. Inspired by Bob's regrets, Park reconciles with Kellan and allows his ex-wife to comfort him when she arrives. Glassman discovers that his cancer has not returned, but that he has meningitis, explaining his memory loss. Glassman and Lea argue over telling Shaun and their respective roles in his life; Glassman chooses to tell Shaun the truth in the end and they share a rare hug.
30	12	"Aftermath"	Dawn Wilkinson	Thomas L. Moran	January 21, 2019	212	6.27
In the aftermath of the quarantine, the governor orders a review of the hospital; the investigator expresses concern about Andrews maintaining his dual role and recommends Shaun, Lim, and Melendez to the medical board for license suspension over their actions. With the ER closed for cleanup, Park spends the day with his ex-wife Mia and son Kellan, Morgan and Claire spend the day helping Claire's mother pack up her apartment, and Shaun and Glassman spend the day with Lea. Park and Mia decide to work on repairing their relationship. Morgan and Claire confront Claire's mother's boyfriend, whom she claims beat her, only to learn that he never abused her; she is panicked because he proposed to her. Claire convinces her mother to work at the romantic relationship. Morgan admits she is sad about Tyler's death. Claire is impressed that Morgan, who once had a stalker, confidently carries a gun and doesn't back down. Glassman decides to speed up his treatment after a fun day while Shaun learns that Lea has a boyfriend, Jake. Lim and Melendez's night together complicates things for them; they ultimately admit to mutual feelings. Due to the legal proceedings, they decide to pursue a secret relationship.
31	13	"Xin"	David Straiton	Brian Shin	January 28, 2019	213	6.58
Claire, Park, and Melendez treat an elderly patient, Sunny, with an estranged biological daughter Grace and a surrogate daughter Teresa. Sunny's mechanical heart is malfunctioning. With her condition deteriorating, the doctors are forced to operate rather than send Sunny to her doctor in China; the surgery is a success. Afterwards, with support from Park and Teresa, Sunny and Grace begin mending their relationship. At the same time, Lim, Morgan, and Shaun treat an autistic patient, Lana, whose brain aneurysm requires surgery during which Lana must be awake and talking so the doctors can gauge her brain function. Shaun and Morgan attempt to recruit Lana's roommate Javi, with whom she has a perfunctory sexual relationship. Javi, also autistic, overcomes his sensitivity to light to be present in the operating room, making the surgery a success; Javi admits his love for Lana. At the same time, Shaun struggles with Lea having a boyfriend. Shaun and Lea acknowledge they make each others' lives better; he agrees to give her needed privacy with Jake. Shaun's overbearing attempts to help an ill Glassman lead to a fight. Following Lea's advice, Shaun acts as a supportive friend rather than as a doctor, which Glassman appreciates.
32	14	"Faces"	Allison Liddi-Brown	David Hoselton	February 4, 2019	214	5.96
A 14-year-old girl, Karin, is left brain dead following a car accident and Andrews asks Karin's mother Shannon to consent to a face transplant for Molly, whose face was destroyed by an accidental gunshot. Shannon consents only after Claire arranges for Shannon to encounter Molly. Melendez, Lim, Andrews, Morgan, Park, and Claire perform a successful transplant. Melendez and Lim question their relationship, as Lim is concerned that Melendez has uncharacteristically deferred to her to the detriment of their initial treatment of Karin; they decide against breaking up. Shannon bonds with Molly and her parents; Shannon and Molly's father both blame themselves for the harm their daughters suffered. Shaun takes the day off to help Glassman, leading to the two getting high on Glassman's medical marijuana. As a result, Shaun, Glassman, and an Uber driver undertake a successful quest to locate Robin, a woman Glassman was in love with in high school, so that he can apologize for an unkind comment he wrote in her yearbook. The experience causes Shaun to reexamine his own feelings for Lea and he admits to Glassman that he is "not all right" with Lea's relationship with her boyfriend Jake.
33	15	"Risk and Reward"	Freddie Highmore	Teleplay by : Liz Friedman & David Renaud; Story by : David Renaud	February 18, 2019	215	6.23
Glassman undergoes chemotherapy and rebuffs the social overtures of fellow patient Larry. He later embraces cancer as an identity and socializes with Larry and leukemia patient Candice. The hospital's new Chief of Surgery, Doctor Jackson Han, assigns Melendez to run tests on Minesh, a wealthy entrepreneur wanting a full workup. Melendez finds a spine tumor with a 95% chance of being benign but, if malignant, Minesh would soon die without risky surgery. Minesh decides to undergo surgery; the tumor is successfully removed, but Minesh will have a permanent limp. Minesh decides against learning the biopsy results; Melendez follows suit. Lim, Shaun, and Claire treat Persephone, a newborn with potentially fatal birth defects of the heart and bowel. Shaun tells Persephone's mother that her antidepressants may have caused the defects; Claire and Lim defend Shaun to an outraged Han. After a complex surgery is seemingly a failure, Shaun has a sudden inspiration that saves Persephone. Shaun's diagnostic skills impress Han, who transfers him to pathology - against Shaun's wishes - so he can save patients without interacting with them.
34	16	"Believe"	Alrick Riley	Sal Calleros & Karen Struck	February 25, 2019	216	6.36
Glassman completes his chemotherapy and attempts to renew his relationship with Debbie. However, hurt by Glassman pushing her away while he was sick, Debbie rebuffs him. Melendez, Claire, and Morgan treat Clarence, a pastor with spinal cancer, who refuses a spinal fusion to fix his pain as he blames himself for a parishioner's suicide and thinks he deserves to suffer. After Clarence's cancer disappears without a medical explanation, Claire, who lost her faith at some point, convinces Clarence to have the spinal fusion. Lim and Park treat Sadie, a young woman who had a premonition that she would die and who appears to have an inoperable and aggressive brain tumor. Shaun, attempting to adjust to working in pathology, realizes that Sadie may have been misdiagnosed; he gets Han to retest her, proving Shaun's hypothesis that Sadie has a treatable parasite. Han publicly credits Shaun as the pathologist who saved a grateful Sadie's life. Shaun requests his old job back, but Han presents Shaun's unique ability to correctly diagnose Sadie as proof that Shaun belongs in pathology.
35	17	"Breakdown"	Mike Listo	Thomas L. Moran & Lloyd Gilyard, Jr.	March 4, 2019	217	6.73
Han meets with the medical review board regarding the events of the quarantine and reaches a compromise where the hospital will pay some fines and Shaun, Lim, and Melendez will have to attend a few classes, but are otherwise clear of trouble. Glassman's final test results show that he is completely cancer-free; after Glassman gives her a personal gift in thanks, Dr. Blaize suggests that his ordeal has changed Glassman for the better. Lim treats the newborn daughter of her old friend Laura who displays signs of shaken baby syndrome; Shaun determines that it was a birth complication, not abuse. Melendez assembles a large team to treat Kenny, a young man with a 200-pound tumor encircling his body. When complications arise, Melendez insists on bringing in Shaun to consult; Shaun can come up with a way to complete the operation safely, but continues to be canceled from the surgery. Thanks to Shaun, the surgery is a success. Furious, Shaun suffers a furious breakdown and demands his job back from Han in a way that leads to Han firing him. After Laura accuses her of a lack of vulnerability and commitment, Lim decides to make her relationship with Melendez public and goes to Andrews with him.
36	18	"Trampoline"	David Shore	David Shore & David Hoselton & Mark Rozeman	March 11, 2019	218	7.78
Morgan and Park treat an elderly patient, Ida; Alex proves Ida is faking post-surgery symptoms, but he apologizes to her after Morgan researches Ida's sad, lonely life. Shaun skips a job interview to drink at a bar where his rambling causes another patron, Zack, to attack him; Zack then collapses. An embarrassed Shaun conceals the altercation; Carly, his old pathology colleague, discreetly helps him diagnose his own internal injuries. Shaun realizes that Zack has been misdiagnosed; Shaun collapses, seemingly saying "trampoline." With Shaun unconscious, Claire successfully replicates Shaun's thought process and diagnoses Zack with treponema, saving him. Shaun recovers. Andrews advocates for Shaun to an unmoved Han. At the risk of his own career, Andrews fires Han and rehires Shaun. Glassman proposes to Debbie; she declines, but later accepts. Claire coaches Shaun on how to ask a woman out and tells him he will grow from his failures. Shaun asks Carly out; she says yes. Lim and Melendez make their relationship public, but Han's firing means one of them may become Chief of Surgery, necessitating a breakup. They agree neither of them should decline the position. Melendez reveals he already knows Andrews has chosen Lim; Aoki calls with the offer.

=== Season 3 (2019–20) ===
No. overall	No. in season	Title	Directed by	Written by	Original release date	Prod. code	U.S. viewers (millions)
37	1	"Disaster"	Mike Listo	David Shore	September 23, 2019	301	6.26
Morgan and Park diagnose elderly patient Harvey with kidney cancer and compete over who will lead the surgery, as new Chief of Surgery Lim will allow third-year residents to do so. Due to Harvey's dementia, the two come together to convince his wife to leave the cancer untreated so that he can enjoy his remaining time. Melendez, Shaun, and Claire treat a newlywed bride with extensive cancer. Shaun proposes a radical, high-risk surgery. With the support of her new husband, she successfully undergoes the surgery, but will permanently need an ileostomy bag; her husband affirms they will both learn its maintenance. Lim and Melendez officially break up, but the HR director deduces they will continue to date in secret and tells them it will be difficult. With advice from Andrews, Lim learns to navigate her employees' requests and hires Andrews to replace her as attending surgeon. Shaun is convinced his eventful first date with Carly was a disaster because the unpredictability of the experience overwhelmed him; despite his friends' advice, he decides another date is not worth it and avoids Carly. Glassman works at an underperforming clinic; Aoki convinces him to return as President by offering to reopen St. Bonaventure's clinic and have him run it.
38	2	"Debts"	Mike Listo	Peter Noah	September 30, 2019	302	6.07
Morgan and Park continue to compete for who will perform the first surgery, but Lim chooses Claire. Lim and Melendez find themselves at odds over the treatment of a baby whose parents and evidence suggest that Melendez erred in a previous surgery; Melendez is ultimately exonerated and he and Lim save the baby together. Andrews, Shaun, and Claire treat a Good Samaritan who had the side of his face destroyed while saving a total stranger. Andrews refuses to give up on the patient and saves his face with an experimental procedure devised by Shaun. Andrews subsequently recognizes that he was driven by anger over the repercussions for his own selfless act of saving Shaun, but realizes that it was worth it. Claire struggles with her mother moving in with her, eventually agreeing to let her stay with conditions. Shaun continues to struggle in his relationship with Carly; after receiving advice from his friends, Shaun decides to have a more relaxed and informal date with Carly in the pathology lab.
39	3	"Claire"	Allison Liddi-Brown	Liz Friedman & Tracy Taylor	October 7, 2019	303	5.59
Morgan and Park treat Shamus O'Malley, a man with a giant marlin impaled in his leg and who is more worried about the fish's safety than his own; the injury causes the doctors to discover that Shamus has cancer, requiring an amputation. Shaun develops doubts about his relationship with Carly after Claire points out that he asked many invasive questions for a new relationship; it turns out that Carly didn't mind Shaun's questions and orders Claire to butt out of their relationship. Claire treats Michelle, a teenager whose gallbladder removal is Claire's first surgery as lead doctor. Claire realizes that Michelle, who has a distant mother, is self-harming; her attempts to help upset the mother, which gets Claire kicked off the surgery. With Michelle and Melendez's support, Claire is allowed to perform the surgery, which is a success. Michelle's mother promises to seek psychological treatment for her daughter. Claire begins to bond with her mother, attending therapy together. However, Claire's mother later dies in a car accident after getting drunk on champagne Claire was saving to celebrate her first surgery.
40	4	"Take My Hand"	Tara Nicole Weyr	Doris Egan	October 14, 2019	304	5.76
Andrews, Park, and Shaun treat Mitchell, a conspiracy theorist with a genetic liver disease and a belief that someone poisoned him; Shaun eventually realizes that Mitchell was inadvertently poisoning himself daily with herbs he'd been taking for virility. Melendez, Claire, and Morgan treat Lily, a woman who's unable to feel physical or emotional pain, resulting in a ruptured appendix and amputated hand. With her husband contemplating leaving her because he believes she cannot feel love without pain, Lily takes medication to gain the sensation of pain, but falls into a depression. Her husband promises to support her no matter what and she cries for joy before Melendez tells them he took Lily off the medication. Claire, still reeling from her mother's recent death, spreads her ashes with Morgan. Claire then has a drunken hookup with a stranger at a bar. Holding hands is important to Carly, but uncomfortable for Shaun; they find a compromise in crossing their wrists. Glassman has cold feet about marrying Debbie after realizing how little he actually knows about her but, after some advice from Shaun, Glassman and Debbie are married in a small civil ceremony.
41	5	"First Case, Second Base"	Rebecca Moline	David Hoselton	October 21, 2019	305	5.54
Morgan and Claire treat Curtis, a man who comes in intoxicated despite supposedly being sober for over six years. Claire, who is still struggling with her mother's death, refuses to believe Curtis is telling the truth about his sobriety while Morgan searches for an alternative explanation; Curtis turns out to have a benign tumor that was causing his intoxication. At the same time, Glassman becomes uncomfortable after learning that Debbie owns a gun and attempts to dissuade her without success. Shaun receives his first lead surgery; his patient is Beth, a friendly woman with esophageal cancer and an apparently easy fix. Andrews realizes Lim is coddling Shaun, which he warns against; Shaun struggles when the case becomes more complicated. During the surgery, Shaun finds a solution to the problem, but one too complicated for himself to perform; instead, Shaun guides Andrews and Lim through the successful procedure. Lim reminds Andrews that it was a team effort, which is more important; he feels that Shaun failed as a surgeon for having to walk out. Shaun's relationship with Carly reaches a new level of intimacy after Carly lets him touch her breast, much to Shaun's delight.
42	6	"45-Degree Angle"	Steve Robin	Sal Calleros	November 4, 2019	306	5.13
Shaun's first lead surgery is an appendectomy; though it is successful, Shaun kicks Nurse Hawks out of the OR for handing him a tool in a way other than his preference. Shaun's inability to apologize escalates the situation; Hawks files a formal complaint and Lim threatens to fire Shaun if another such incident occurs. Melendez, Park, and Morgan treat Patty, a twenty-three-week pregnant woman with an ovarian tumor. The team and the parents clash over Patty's treatment as both Melendez and Patty want to save the baby, even at the risk of Patty's life. Patty dies in surgery and her underdeveloped baby is delivered to an uncertain future; Melendez is devastated by Patty's loss. Debbie is fired from the coffee shop and convinces Glassman to hire her as his office manager. Carly has friends over and doesn't invite Shaun, leaving him doubting their relationship. Claire's meddling only exacerbates things and Morgan confronts Claire over her increasingly self-destructive behavior, for which Morgan has been covering. Carly acknowledges that she was wrong to assume her friends would not accept Shaun. Carly refers to herself as Shaun's "girlfriend" and he is delighted that their relationship is official.
43	7	"SFAD"	Alrick Riley	Jessica Grasl	November 11, 2019	307	5.93
Melendez continues to struggle with the death of Patty, resulting in him taking more caution with patients. After an intervention by Glassman, he tells Lim that he thinks they are both at fault due to their relationship removing objectivity from the decision to approve the surgery. Debbie's efforts to help in the clinic lead to an argument with Glassman. Andrews, Claire, and Morgan treat Charlie, a boy who is about to lose his sight due to cancer. Morgan and a reluctant Claire take Charlie on a fun day, leading to Claire connecting with him emotionally; fed up with Claire's continuing cynicism, a worried Morgan orders her to deal with her issues rather than let them change her. Shaun, Park, and Melendez treat Tara, a young woman with no immune system. Park suggests using gene therapy to cure Tara's condition; Shaun's ability to empathize with Tara helps convince her to take the treatment. Tara is apparently cured and is able to emerge from her bubble and enjoy fresh air for the first time.
44	8	"Moonshot"	X. Dean Lim	David Renaud	November 18, 2019	308	5.49
Melendez's continuing hesitation to take risks puts him at odds with Lim over the treatment of Wren, a young woman who plans to travel to the moon and thus needs both of her lungs intact; working together, Lim and Melendez successfully perform her surgery. Lim ends their relationship since she can't pursue her dreams and be everything Melendez needs at the same time. Morgan is assigned her first lead surgery; Andrews reveals that he believes Morgan has it in her to be a leader. Privately, she reveals to Glassman that she has recently been diagnosed with rheumatoid arthritis and seeks his support for both treatment and help continuing her career; though Morgan is successful with the complicated surgery, her condition appears to be worse than she's willing to admit. Shaun and Park treat Rosalind, a doctor who advanced the field of leukemia treatment, but is in heart failure and has pushed everybody in her life away from her; Park convinces Rosalind's ex-husband Leo to be at her side as she dies. Shaun has trouble sharing intimacy with Carly, leading to troubles between the two; Park helps Shaun understand that much of his troubles come from fear and he commits himself to resolving the issue.
45	9	"Incomplete"	Marisol Adler	Brian Shin	November 25, 2019	309	5.86
Claire's self-destructive behavior leads her into a moral dilemma when her latest one-night stand arrives in the hospital following a car accident and turns out to have a family; at Claire's urging, his wife forces him to tell her the truth, leading to Claire getting publicly slapped. Morgan, Shaun, and Andrews treat Jeanie, a young woman who refuses to have life-threatening tumors removed because it would also remove her ability to have sex; Morgan convinces Jeanie's fiancé to get her to have the surgery. Lim and Melendez's relationship remains strained following their breakup; Lim eventually admits to having second thoughts about the breakup. Shaun tries to have sex with Carly for the first time, but has trouble with the intimacy and vulnerability; before leaving, Shaun admits that his greatest fear is that Carly will tire of his issues and leave him. At the end of the episode, Glassman brings Shaun the news that Shaun's father has pancreatic cancer and may only have a few days left to live.
46	10	"Friends and Family"	Mike Listo	Thomas L. Moran	December 2, 2019	310	6.11
Claire, Melendez, Park, and Morgan treat Art Kalman, a professional football player who broke his back at the gym. Morgan's suggested course of treatment proves effective and he is expected to be able to return to football, but Art reveals that he hates the sport and felt pushed into it, purposefully injuring himself as a way of getting out. After Art explains he feels obligated to his family, particularly his mother, Claire uses her own experiences to convince him to be honest with his family and quit. Claire, who is shown to be communicating with a possible new boyfriend, finally starts seeing a therapist for her own issues. At the same time, Shaun returns to Wyoming with Glassman and Lea to see his dying father Ethan. After exploding at the man, Shaun is convinced by his friends and mother to make peace with Ethan. In return, Ethan proves only to have venomous words for Shaun before passing away. A distraught Shaun allows Lea to hold him as he breaks down in the aftermath.
47	11	"Fractured"	Gary Hawes	Mark Rozeman	January 13, 2020	311	5.09
Park and Claire treat Luca Jones, a man who became a drug mule after falling on hard times; Claire clashes with Park over whether or not to turn Luca into the police, sympathetic with his circumstances. Luca later flees the hospital with drugs that were surgically removed from him, suggesting that Park was right about him. Claire continues seeing a therapist who suggests that she has PTSD. Shaun and Morgan treat Kerry, a patient with a badly broken leg who refuses painkillers or anesthesia due to being an opioid addict; after she continues to refuse despite her husband's reassurances that he will stand by her, the team is ultimately forced to perform a very painful operation on her, which she endures while conscious and sensate. After platonically spending the night with Lea, Shaun struggles with his feelings for both Lea and Carly. Glassman comforts him through a brief emotional breakdown over his fears of ending up alone. Shaun tells Carly the truth and she asks for some time alone. She later thanks Shaun for his honesty and asks him to stop living with Lea if Carly and Shaun's relationship is to progress; Shaun agrees and tells Carly that he loves her.
48	12	"Mutations"	Nestor Carbonell	Liz Friedman & Tracy Taylor	January 20, 2020	312	5.44
Shaun, Morgan, Andrews, and Lim treat James, a man who is suffering swelling due to a genetic mutation which makes his treatment extremely difficult; if not properly treated, he will drown in his own fluids. As a result, Carly is called in to help the team, but she struggles with dealing with a live patient rather than samples; Carly and Shaun's research using zebra fish ultimately finds a treatment that saves James' life. At the same time, Claire, Park, and Melendez treat Angie, a cancer patient whose brain tumor has returned and whose mother tries to keep her boyfriend Ryan (a cancer patient himself whose tumor has just been eradicated) away from her; at Claire's suggestion, the hospital throws the teens a small prom. However, the tumor proves impossible to remove, even with Glassman's help, and Angie dies shortly afterwards; Ryan and her mother comfort each other in the aftermath. Morgan is suffering from nausea due to the medication for her rheumatoid arthritis while Claire continues to struggle with her mother's death; Melendez offers catharsis via jogging. Shaun and Carly continue to struggle following their fight; after saving James, they have sex for the first time.
49	13	"Sex and Death"	Steven DePaul	Doris Egan	January 27, 2020	313	5.69
The team treats Caroline Reznik, an artist who needs a lobectomy to treat her cerebral cavernous malformations; Caroline turns out to be Morgan's long-estranged mother and it is revealed that she is from a family of famous artists. Morgan eventually finds another solution that she and her brother Ariel get Caroline to accept; after some convincing, Glassman successfully performs the surgery. At the same time, Shaun and Melendez treat Oliver, a man dying of cancer who is determined to live life to the fullest while putting himself at great risk; this leads to his wife leaving him due to feeling like Oliver is not putting her first. Morgan induces a seizure in her mom after finding out what has been going on with her. Oliver develops an infection that ironically saves his life by causing his own immune system to attack and shrink the tumor to the point that it can be removed; afterwards, Oliver appears to be left directionless. After learning that Carly was unsatisfied by the sex they had, Shaun studies sex to be better the next time; by comparing Shaun's focus on sex to his focus on surgery, Lim is able to give Shaun helpful advice that finally allows him to pleasure Carly.
50	14	"Influence"	Barbara Brown	Teleplay by : Peter Noah & David Shore; Story by : Peter Noah	February 10, 2020	314	5.59
Claire, Park, and Melendez treat Ann, a mother who fell ill after trying a home remedy she found on the Internet for her urinary tract infections. Ann's diagnosis helps discover serious heart ailments in her three-year-old daughter Marla. Marla soon has a heart attack, but the doctors successfully treat her and promise Ann that, with lifelong medication, Marla should enjoy a long and healthy life. Meanwhile, Shaun, Morgan, and Andrews treat Kayley, a social media influencer. During Kayley's surgery, a complication arises when Morgan slips; though quickly corrected, both Glassman and Morgan are left concerned that it was due to her rheumatoid arthritis. Kayley draws media attention to Shaun for saving her life, which leaves him uncomfortable. After consideration, Shaun refuses, wanting to be known as a good doctor, not a good autistic doctor. At the same time, his continuing friendship with Lea causes friction with Carly. Carly admits she's jealous of Lea and decides to work on it. After Lea quits her job, Shaun convinces a reluctant Glassman to hire her as his assistant. Both Park and Morgan notice the growing closeness between Claire and Melendez. Shortly, an anonymous favoritism complaint towards Claire is filed against Melendez.
51	15	"Unsaid"	Mike Listo	Teleplay by : Sal Calleros & Thomas L. Moran; Story by : Sal Calleros	February 17, 2020	315	5.23
Lim, Morgan, and Shaun treat Cory, a young boy born without a fully-developed trachea or larynx; after an experimental surgery to give him a trachea, Shaun comes up with a way to give Cory a larynx. Morgan is revealed to have been the one to file a complaint against Melendez and she shows increasing signs of deterioration from her rheumatoid arthritis. At the same time, Melendez, Park, and Claire treat Fran, a firefighter who suffered a serious arm injury in a dog attack. Tensions rise between Park and Claire after Park takes credit for the complaint against Melendez, which causes a strain in Melendez and Claire's friendship; after being confronted about his behavior by both Lim and Claire, Melendez begins repairing his friendship with Claire. Though Carly appears to be okay with Shaun's relationship with Lea, after a charged night of karaoke with Lea and her current boyfriend, a heartbroken Carly breaks up with Shaun, insisting that he and Lea love each other and Shaun should be with her.
52	16	"Autopsy"	Freddie Highmore	David Hoselton	February 24, 2020	316	5.63
An elderly Jane Doe comes into the ER with an aneurysm and dies on the operating table. Shaun becomes convinced that there is more to Jane's death and works to find Jane's family. He and Park locate her son Jules. Shaun learns that the Jane Doe, Maribel, had a rare deadly condition that Jules inherited. At the same time, Morgan, Andrews, and Claire treat Aiden Porter, a young man who injured himself and subsequently displays blackouts and sleepwalking, during which time Aiden has a completely opposing personality. Aiden is discovered to have a cyst on his hypothalamus causing his condition, but he resists having it drained and getting rid of his alternate personality. Morgan convinces the second personality to agree to the treatment. She also confesses to and apologizes to Claire for making the complaint about favouritism. Lim finds herself drawn to a young girl she spots wandering around the hospital, who turns out to be an abandoned baby Lim found eight years before. She helps her get through her fears. Shaun confesses his love for Lea, but she refuses to be his girlfriend, as she fears that dating her will be too much for Shaun to handle.
53	17	"Fixation"	Lisa Demaine	Jessica Grasl & Debbie Ezer	March 2, 2020	317	5.66
Shaun, Melendez, and Claire treat Alice Gottfried, who has a rare condition that requires her adrenal glands to be removed. With Alice refusing the treatment, Shaun invents a better surgery that is successful and which Melendez allows Shaun to perform himself. At the same time, Andrews, Morgan, and Park treat Wes Keeler, a survival instructor for at-risk youth who has developed a serious infection from a cactus prick, requiring a kidney transplant. One of his mentees, Max, proves to be a match, but Lim refuses, as she feels Max isn't mature enough to make the decision despite Andrews, Morgan, and Park being on Max's side. At Wes' request, Lim lies to Max about the results, but Wes is left with little time to live unless they can find a suitable donor. Park's son Kellan visits, leaving Park worried about his panic attacks and withdrawn state. Claire's old friend Dash returns to visit and asks Claire on a date, which she appears to accept on Melendez's advice. Lea once again rejects Shaun, but this time she specifies that it's because of his autism, which is something he can't "fix," leaving Shaun devastated.
54	18	"Heartbreak"	Steven DePaul	Teleplay by : Thomas L. Moran & David Renaud; Story by : David Renaud	March 9, 2020	318	5.75
Shaun, reeling from Lea's double rejection, returns after three days at home and works with Claire and Melendez to treat Finn, a patient with a breathing disorder and two girlfriends; one learns of the other and vandalizes Finn's car. Shaun gets drunk and plans to vandalize Lea's car, but she catches him in the act and Shaun instead shouts at her about her negative feelings towards his autism. Park, Morgan, Lim, and Andrews treat a farmer who has pain and limited strength after having had both arms reattached after an accident. Andrews recommends amputation, which Lim doesn't want to do, but ultimately must. Morgan reveals her rheumatoid arthritis to Lim and says the surgery will be her last, but changes her mind after the farmer's successful operation. Despite Glassman's disapproval, Morgan decides on a synovectomy to prolong her surgical career at the risk of permanent disability later in life. Claire admits to Melendez that she doesn't want a relationship with Dash and he tells her she makes him a better person. Claire later tells her therapist that she loves Melendez.
55	19	"Hurt"	Mike Listo	Liz Friedman & Adam Scott Weissman	March 23, 2020	319	6.81
Melendez, Glassman, and Lea are attending a charity fundraiser at a brewery for Marta, one of Melendez's former patients. Marta's wife, Noreen, gives them a tour of the brewery when a massive earthquake hits, trapping Lea in the basement and injuring Melendez's head. Lim organizes assistance at the brewery while Andrews oversees the E.R., but Morgan takes charge when Andrews starts operating with Glassman. Shaun looks for Lea while Park and Lim treat Casey, a young man trapped under a beam. Park proposes a very risky surgery to save Casey's life. Melendez and Claire have to operate on Marta in-situ to save her from certain paralysis. Meanwhile, Shaun finds Vera in the basement; her leg is impaled on steel cords which he can't remove. They bond as Shaun admits he doesn't want to move on from Lea (who has been rescued and is listening on a two-way radio). Just as Melendez and Claire get Marta to an ambulance, an aftershock hits; Melendez collapses from his injuries and the basement begins to flood. At the hospital, Morgan, despite her synovectomy, decides to operate on a young woman with an ectopic pregnancy with only a nurse to assist.
56	20	"I Love You"	David Shore	Teleplay by : David Hoselton & David Shore; Story by : David Hoselton & Adam Scott Weissman	March 30, 2020	320	7.71
Lim and Park's surgery on Casey fails; Park remains with Casey, who reveals that he blames himself for his mother's death and wants to make amends with his father for his perceived mistake. With Casey's father unable to make it in time, Park pretends to be him to give the young man peace before he dies; the experience causes Park to decide to move back to Phoenix to be closer to his family. Lim returns to the ER where Claire calls her in to help treat Melendez, who has internal bleeding; while performing surgery to repair it, Claire and Lim discover damage to Melendez's bowel that can't be repaired. Melendez makes peace with Lim and he and Claire express their feelings for each other before Melendez dies; Lim and Claire comfort each other in the aftermath. Morgan succeeds in saving her patient, but Andrews warns that the damage she did to her hands in the process might have destroyed her surgical career forever. In danger of drowning with Vera, Shaun is forced to perform a leg amputation in just a few minutes while a helpless Lea listens over the radio. Shaun succeeds in saving Vera and starts a relationship with Lea, who realizes how much she loves Shaun after nearly losing him.

=== Season 4 (2020–21) ===
No. overall	No. in season	Title	Directed by	Written by	Original release date	Prod. code	U.S. viewers (millions)
57	1	"Frontline Part 1"	Mike Listo	Liz Friedman & David Shore	November 2, 2020	401	4.87
The hospital struggles against the COVID-19 pandemic and forces changes on the way everyone lives: Shaun and Lea are obliged to remain apart, Park is staying with Shaun, Glassman works from home, and Andrews sleeps in his garage to protect his wife. The situation takes its toll on everyone: Shaun struggles with being so far from Lea, Glassman becomes overprotective of Debbie to the point of annoyance, and Lim and Claire become short-tempered. The episode primarily focuses on three COVID patients: a woman who doesn't survive whose daughter Claire empathizes with, a man who is in constant video contact with his wife and is put on a ventilator by Shaun and Andrews, and finally a pregnant woman with whom Park bonds and who he takes care of personally. Morgan treats a man with symptoms of diverticulitis, but later discovers that he has COVID and both she and nurse Deena Petringa have been exposed. While looking at the personal belongings of the hospital's COVID patients, Claire hallucinates Melendez. The episode is prefaced with a title card stating that the events are a fictional story about a real battle still being fought. The title card tells the audience to honor the frontline heroes of the fight, many of whom have given their lives, and ends with the direction to "Do your part. Wear a mask."
58	2	"Frontline Part 2"	Mike Listo	Liz Friedman & David Shore	November 9, 2020	402	4.76
Claire deals with her grief by returning patients' belongings to their families while hallucinating Melendez. Claire tracks down the owner of a set of dog tags left behind by a deceased patient and, with the encouragement of Melendez, decides to begin moving on with her life. At the same time, Lim struggles with the increasing losses of patients to COVID-19, Park continues to treat his formerly pregnant patient, and Shaun and Andrews attempt to save a man who must have his right foot and ankle amputated. Now working as an internist and recovered from her own bout with COVID, Morgan treats Nurse Deena Petringa whose condition continually worsens; the two women bond, with Deena offering Morgan advice based on her forty years of nursing experience. Deena ultimately dies of the virus, but Shaun's, Andrews', and Park's patients survive with one released three weeks later. Glassman opens up to and reconciles with Debbie while Shaun allows Lea to spend time with him in person again, Andrews decides to be with his wife instead of continuing to sleep in the garage, and Park decides to end his romantic relationship with Mia and continue co-parenting Kellan together instead. The episode is prefaced with a title card stating that the events are a fictional story about a real battle still being fought. The title card tells the audience to honor the frontline heroes of the fight, many of whom have given their lives, and ends with the direction to "Do your part. Wear a mask."
59	3	"Newbies"	David Straiton	Thomas L. Moran & David Renaud	November 16, 2020	403	4.30
Shaun, Claire, and Park are assigned to supervise six resident applicants with only four positions available while Morgan struggles with the transition to internal medicine. Andrews, Shaun, and Park treat a seventeen year old getting breast implants to fix a deformity; while the surgery is initially successful, she experiences complications that put her into a coma. It is determined that the patient formed a blood clot in her brain, but Andrews manages to remove it using a stent retriever. Morgan discovers that her patient has a tumor on his heart and enlists Claire and Lim's help to fix it, but has trouble stepping back from the case to the point that Lim has to throw Morgan out of the operating room; despite some difficulties, the surgery is a success and Morgan gives Claire credit as the surgeon responsible. While having lunch with Lea, Shaun inadvertently insults her, but after getting advice from Glassman, makes up with her by being totally honest about everything that he loves about Lea. The team selects doctors Jordan Allen, Asher Wolke, Olivia Jackson, and Enrique Guerin as the new residents; Lim reveals that Shaun, Claire, and Park will be helping to train the new residents and warns them not to take the responsibility lightly. Prefacing this episode is a statement delivered by Freddie Highmore, looking directly into the camera and speaking in his natural English Londoner accent: "Hello, I'm Freddie Highmore. The following episode portrays our hope for the future, a future where no one will have to wear masks or take other steps to stay safe from COVID. Until then, please protect yourself and others."
60	4	"Not the Same"	Sarah Wayne Callies	David Hoselton & Adam Scott Weissman	November 23, 2020	404	4.29
While treating Billy Carr, one of Morgan's patients, Asher discovers that Billy has skin cancer instead of an ingrown hair. Despite some complications, Billy pulls through. Shaun and his junior residents Olivia and Jordan treat Kenzie, a pregnant woman with twins whose own body is trying to kill one of her unborn children. Shaun comes up with the solution of delivering the stronger twin and then stopping labor so that the weaker twin can grow; despite some troubles, the plan succeeds. Shaun struggles with mentoring Olivia and Jordan and being in charge, so he seeks advice from Glassman and Andrews; taking to heart the criticisms that he receives, Shaun provides Olivia with the support that she needs and Jordan with a list of her mistakes that she needs to correct. At home, Shaun asks Lea to move back in; though she doesn't think it's a good idea since they're a couple, she ultimately does. Morgan continues to struggle with no longer being a surgeon while Park, who has just divorced, moves in with her. Olivia is revealed to be Andrews' niece.
61	5	"Fault"	Vanessa Parise	Peter Blake & Mark Rozeman	November 30, 2020	405	4.02
Claire, Park, Enrique, and Jordan treat Ellie, a young woman who has both a husband Brendan and a new weeklong relationship with boyfriend Zane; the polyamorous Enrique takes Ellie's side in the matter. The team removes a dermal cyst, but it causes memory issues with Ellie, threatening the memories of her relationship with Zane; Enrique solves the matter by having Ellie film a message to herself pre-operation and, with full knowledge of her affair, Ellie ultimately chooses to remain with Brendan. At the same time, Asher bonds with his first patient, Carl, but misses an aneurysm, which Shaun also misses, since he does not check Carl when Asher asks. Carl ultimately dies, devastating both Asher and Shaun, who receives comfort from both Glassman and Lea. At the same time, Morgan and Park adjust to living together and realize that they are both still unable to move on from their exes, leading to the two burning mementos of their exes together.
62	6	"Lim"	Mike Listo	Jessica Grasl & Tracy Taylor	January 11, 2021	406	4.06
Lim and Claire treat Ben, a military veteran suffering from PTSD; the two agree to perform an experimental procedure for his condition after Ben nearly commits suicide. After losing Carl, Shaun, struggling with guilt along with Asher, refuses to train residents; Lim later has Shaun and Asher perform Ben's procedure together, which proves to be successful in that Ben can finally open up about his trauma. Lim assigns Jordan to perform an abortion despite her reluctance due to her religious beliefs; after walking out of the procedure, Jordan reveals that she has had an abortion herself. Lim treats Rose, a woman who claims to have empathic abilities; Rose is diagnosed with Variant angina, a heart condition causing her symptoms, but offers Lim advice on her troubles. Having developed PTSD from her experiences while treating the COVID-19 pandemic, Lim is short-tempered and rude to those around her; she later suffers a motorcycle accident. Shaun struggles to find a meaningful birthday gift for Lea, ultimately throwing her a birthday party at the hospital. Due to a dare, Morgan and Park engage in various antics throughout the hospital.
63	7	"The Uncertainty Principle"	Gary Hawes	Doris Egan	January 18, 2021	407	3.97
Claire, Jordan, and Olivia treat a woman with a history of cancers and a venture capitalist husband who has been overworking himself to cope with his fears of losing her; after the woman is diagnosed with Li–Fraumeni syndrome, a genetic predisposition to cancer, Claire suggests he help his wife through her treatment before divorcing her. At the same time, Andrews, Park, Shaun, Asher, and Enrique treat a man who is attempting to extend his life using CRISPR gene editing, but caused a series of disorders that will cause him pain for the rest of his life. Shaun is able to figure out how to use CRISPR to reverse the damage, but the patient chooses to live with the pain and without his wife rather than lose the benefits of CRISPR; the cancer patient's husband, in contrast, chooses to sell his business to devote himself to taking care of his wife. During this time, Jordan attempts to sell a shoe insert that she has invented. Shaun learns Lea has an ex-husband. Lea seeks shower sex; after carefully researching it, Shaun agrees to it. Claire and Enrique begin developing a stronger friendship. On her way to visit Lim, Claire discovers Lim's wrecked motorcycle.
64	8	"Parenting"	Rachel Leiterman	Patti Carr	January 25, 2021	408	4.30
Shaun, Asher, and Enrique treat Darya, a young gymnast with a distant relationship with her father and who needs spinal fusion surgery that would ruin her career. At the same time, Andrews, Jordan, and Olivia treat Darya's father who suffers from a ruptured esophagus. Andrews encourages Olivia to be more aggressive in her interactions and treatment of patients; Olivia later asserts her independence from Andrews' view of her. Lim forces Darya to see the impact of her choices and she reconciles with her father and undergoes the spinal fusion. Lea's parents come for a surprise visit and Shaun suggests that they are judging Lea by her mistakes in the past rather than who Lea is now; Lea's parents later invite the two to dinner, suggesting that they took Shaun's words to heart. Lea confronts Glassman over his own issues with their relationship and Glassman admits that, while he does like Lea, he knows that she is in a position to break Shaun's heart and he can't stop worrying about Shaun's safety. Lim continues to refuse to seek treatment for her PTSD and to spiral even further out of control; concerned, Claire reports Lim's condition to Glassman.
65	9	"Irresponsible Salad Bar Practices"	Felipe Rodriguez	Sam Chanse & Liz Friedman	February 15, 2021	409	4.40
Claire, Enrique, and Andrews treat Zara, an African-American medical marijuana dispensary owner; after racially profiling Zara upon admission to the hospital, Claire's mistake nearly kills her. Despite being removed from the team for the surgery, Claire's insight saves Zara's life; Claire later makes amends with Zara, who helps Claire realize that she has spent her life adjusting her behavior to make white people comfortable, something that greatly bothers Claire along with the revelation that African-American and Latino patients get lesser pain management from doctors. At the same time, Shaun, Jordan, and Asher treat Rio, a transgender man (portrayed by Emmett Preciado) with a pituitary tumor exacerbated by an unexpected pregnancy; Rio's decision to keep the baby causes problems with his fiancé Eli until Shaun helps convince Eli to support Rio's decision. During Rio's surgery, he experiences problems due to an air embolism, sending Lim into a PTSD episode; Lim quickly recovers and they are able to save Rio and remove the tumor. Having continued to resist treatment for her condition, Lim finally begins taking medication after the incident with Rio and she opens up to Andrews about her condition. Shaun finds himself with a crush on radiology resident Cintia D'Souza and a somewhat amused Lea works to help him through it.
66	10	"Decrypt"	Freddie Highmore	Thomas L. Moran & Adam Scott Weissman	February 22, 2021	410	3.91
The hospital suffers a cyberattack from hackers who demand $2 million or they will destroy the hospital's data and imaging machines. After figuring out how to repair the servers, Lea concludes that the hackers are bluffing, but she is left struggling on whether to act; Glassman orders her not to take the risk. Lea restores the system anyways, proving to be correct; although Glassman is angry, Lea earns his respect. Morgan, Park, Asher, and Jordan treat Jamie, a young woman with Down syndrome who needs a liver transplant; they find an ex-inmate who is a match and both survive surgery. Claire, Shaun, Olivia, and Lim treat Cort, a philanthropist who reveals that he lied about being a cancer survivor. A hospital whistleblower reveals the truth to the media and Lim accuses Claire; Lim later apologizes and the two make up. Olivia takes responsibility for the whistleblowing and is fired; Andrews reveals to Olivia that he was the whistleblower. Olivia explains that she had never wanted to be a doctor; Andrews promises to support her.
67	11	"We're All Crazy Sometimes"	Mike Listo	David Hoselton & David Renaud	March 8, 2021	411	4.24
Morgan and Shaun treat Dannie, a woman comatose for ten years following a brain aneurysm whose husband Elias can't bear to let go. After they remove a tumor, Dannie unexpectedly regains consciousness, but the situation is only temporary; at Morgan's suggestion, Dannie signs a DNR. Park, who is still living with Morgan, is burdened by Glassman's rejection of having him on the surgical team. Glassman, Andrews, Claire, and Asher treat Jeffrey, a young man with ankylosing spondylitis. A complication nearly forces the team to reverse the surgery, but Glassman finds a solution; afterwards, Jeffrey stands aided by a walker and hugs Glassman. Andrews offers Glassman three cases that he had previously rejected. Asher and Claire confront fears related to their mothers. Lea's car is towed by a man who tries charging Lea exorbitant fees; Shaun helps Lea escape with her car after paying the man what he is actually owed. Lea reveals to Shaun that she's pregnant.
68	12	"Teeny Blue Eyes"	Rebecca Moline	Peter Blake & Mark Rozeman	March 22, 2021	412	4.26
Shaun, Claire, and Enrique treat surgeon Silas Chambers, who demands that the team perform a risky surgery so that he can continue his surgical career. Shaun thinks that Chambers is also autistic and attempts to convince him not to have the surgery, but Chambers chooses to do it; the surgery is a success and Silas thanks Shaun and Enrique. Morgan, Park, Asher, and Lim treat Oscar, who feels intense pain at the slightest touch to his face; Morgan and Park disagree over his treatment, but come together to save Oscar from a dangerous complication. After Park admits an attraction to her, Morgan orders him to move out, but then reveals that the attraction is mutual; they kiss. Enrique leaves the hospital in order to help out in needy areas. Claire looks at information about a music tour in Paris. Shaun and Lea struggle with what to do about her pregnancy; after initially deciding to get an abortion, they change their minds and decide to keep the baby.
69	13	"Spilled Milk"	Sarah Wayne Callies	Jessica Grasl & Tracy Taylor	March 29, 2021	413	4.39
Maya Flores, a dancer who suffers from bleeding after a collision with an elbow, is rushed to surgery shortly after her arrival, as her bleeding is not clotting. After surgery, she tells the team that her right leg has been bothering her for months and Shaun proposes taking X-rays of her hip and femur in order to rule out a possible fracture. Wolke tells her a personal story in order to coax her into not risking her life by continuing her dance career. Come the next surgery, she starts rejecting platelets. Wolke asks her dance partner, Leo, to make the decision to save Maya's life. Claire gets a surprise visit from her long-distance father, who suffers a sudden stroke and is brought to St. Bonaventure to be treated. Though she is initially reluctant to forgive her father, she is encouraged by both Shaun and Lim to reconcile with him. Shaun accompanies Lea to her ultrasound after being at odds with her over what she views as a lack of feeling from him for their child.
70	14	"Gender Reveal"	Tim Southam	Debbie Ezer	April 19, 2021	414	4.15
Morgan, Park, and Asher treat Bradley Vargas, an MMA fighter with breast cancer; Bradley chooses a debilitating chemotherapy treatment rather than the mastectomy that he needs due to fears of ruining his image, but Park convinces him to have the surgery. Shaun, Claire, and Jordan treat Jean, a Naval aviator who has complications during hip replacement surgery that prove to be difficult to diagnose; after learning that Jean's regular doctor dismissed many of her symptoms as being from menopause, the three turn to social media for ideas. Jean is ultimately diagnosed with Parkinson's disease, with the delay in treatment causing her to have irreversible symptoms and ending her career; Jean's daughter Tory comforts her as she breaks down. Shaun and Lea discover that they are having a girl and argue over Lea getting a doula, but Shaun eventually agrees to Lea's request. Morgan encourages Park to see other women.
71	15	"Waiting"	Gary Hawes	Teleplay by : David Hoselton & David Shore; Story by : Oren Gottfried	April 26, 2021	415	3.78
At a protest, two boys, Ethan and Mason, are shot in the head and chest respectively and rushed to St. Bonaventure. Their mothers, Taryn and Carina, are supported by Lea, who is awaiting results on a gestational diabetes test; however, the two women argue over their differing political views. While the initial surgeries are successful, Mason experiences a complication requiring a blood transfusion, but the hospital lacks enough blood; Taryn donates some of her own and Mason survives. Ethan is discovered to have a bullet fragment that could ultimately kill him. Park almost leaves the case due to being reminded of Kellan; Morgan convinces him not to abandon Ethan and he figures out a way to remove the fragment, saving Ethan's life. Claire and Asher have a falling out over their own political views, but they decide to have a meal together and talk it out. Park decides to end his sex-only relationship with Morgan and pursues a relationship with Heather. Lea's test results come back good but, as she and Shaun leave the hospital, Lea suddenly collapses in pain.
72	16	"Dr. Ted"	Anne Renton	Patti Carr & Sam Chanse	May 10, 2021	416	3.91
An elderly woman named Maxine is rushed into St. Bonaventure after collapsing at an Art Nouveau event. After flatlining and then coming back to life, the staff discovers she is terminally ill and has a heart implant meant to keep her blood pumping should her heart stop. She then elects to have surgery to remove the pump, having signed a DNR, but an infection takes hold. Maxine refuses antibiotics in order to facilitate her death. However, Asher, after losing his grandmother without a chance to say goodbye, develops a connection to Maxine to convince her to change her mind through various unsuccessful attempts; he later slips antibiotics into her IV to keep her alive. Dr. Glassman later reprimands Asher for his acts and urges him to "make things right," which he does by offering Maxine an aid-in-dying request. Meanwhile, Lea is diagnosed with type II vasa praevia, in which the baby's blood vessels are at risk of rupture; she later undergoes surgery. Complications arise when it is revealed that she has a clot in her lung and one in the baby's umbilical cord; the second clot went unnoticed, which means the baby can't survive. She subsequently decides to have a surgical abortion to remove the baby post mortem.
73	17	"Letting Go"	James Genn	Doris Egan	May 17, 2021	417	3.80
Claire, Lim, and Morgan treat Claire's idol, Senator Marian Clark, who has a brain aneurysm and is more worried about her image than being truthful to her husband. Shaun refuses to take time off of work, which causes him to brashly accuse Dr. Paul Nakano of making a mistake during patient Artie Hill's bypass surgery that's causing his mild heart failure. Shaun later realizes that he was wrong about Paul having made a mistake but right about there being a problem and he stops the surgery just in time to save Artie's life; with Shaun's help, Paul and Andrews are able to perform the correct surgery on Artie. Paul, Andrews' former mentor as a resident, decides to retire after making a minor mistake during the surgery rather than continue to risk his patients' lives going forward. Shaun struggles to understand how to deal with his loss. Falling into depression, Lea avoids revealing the miscarriage to her mother and struggles with the well-wishes of her colleagues. Upon talking to both Glassman and Andrews, Shaun silently holds Lea as she breaks down, the only other person who can understand what she's going through.
74	18	"Forgive or Forget"	Lee Friedlander	Thomas L. Moran & David Renaud	May 24, 2021	418	4.03
Shaun surprises a grieving Lea with a camping trip. When they arrive at Yosemite, they are turned away. They arrive at a new campsite, where they struggle to acclimatize to the outdoors. The next morning, during a planned hike, Shaun falls off a log, seriously injuring his ankle. Lea performs emergency surgery on him using a tent repair kit and a fish hook to save his life. Claire tries to avoid a conversation with her father about their past. Claire and Lim treat a 12-year-old girl with a growth on her neck; when it is discovered that the growth has become dangerous, they take her into surgery. Park, Morgan, and Asher take on the case of a man using mushrooms to combat his depression, with Park's professional judgement affected due to his battered relationship with Morgan. After a heated argument with Glassman over her gun, Debbie packs up and leaves.
75	19	"Venga"	Mike Listo	Liz Friedman & Jessica Grasl	May 31, 2021	419	3.56
The doctors travel to Guatemala to perform 12 surgeries on patients who would otherwise die. Andrews enlists Shaun's help to come up with a surgical plan after bonding with a young boy, Bastion, who requires a complex surgery to remove a tumor. Claire bonds with Edna, a single mother with gallstones. Morgan is devastated by having to reject a young boy as a possible candidate and refuses Park's attempts to comfort her. Lea continues to struggle with the loss of her baby and tells Shaun that she is considering moving back to Pennsylvania for a while to recover from the constant reminders of their loss. One of the candidates develops a blood clot that Shaun and Claire break up with snake venom, but it discredits him from surgery, resulting in both Andrews' and Claire's patients making the final list. Lim bonds with Mexican doctor Mateo Rendón Osma. The two are taken to a family going through a rough labor; Lim and Mateo successfully deliver the baby and, upon their return to the hotel, they have sex.
76	20	"Vamos"	Mike Listo	Peter Blake & David Shore	June 7, 2021	420	3.99
The doctors begin performing the surgeries while hampered on the first day; after revealing that his wife is seeing someone else, Andrews gives up his wedding ring to pay for the supplies to successfully complete surgery on Bastion. Claire's patient, Edna, is diagnosed with gallbladder cancer; when Edna develops complications, Shaun encourages Claire to trust her own instincts and she saves Edna. One of their patients reinjures himself at work and Morgan must operate herself; despite experiencing intense pain, Morgan completes most of the surgery before Park takes over. Lim opens up to Mateo about her PTSD and, in turn, he reveals that he has an outstanding warrant in the United States for assault; Mateo promises to visit Lim once his legal issues clear up. Morgan opens up to Park about her fears and they start a relationship. Claire decides to remain in Guatemala to work at the hospital. After helping to save a baby's life, Lea decides not to return to Pennsylvania and instead proposes to Shaun, who accepts.

=== Season 5 (2021–22) ===
No. overall	No. in season	Title	Directed by	Written by	Original release date	Prod. code	U.S. viewers (millions)
77	1	"New Beginnings"	Mike Listo	Liz Friedman & David Shore	September 27, 2021	501	3.99
Shaun, Park, and Lim discover that a tonsillectomy patient's brother, a boy named Jordan, has cervical cancer in his throat, which he got in utero from his mother Sarah. While Jordan's treatment can wait, Sarah needs an immediate radical hysterectomy. She refuses, as she doesn't have anyone to rely on, until Park convinces her to make amends with her estranged brother Nick. Lea plans and throws an engagement party. At the party, Glassman gives a drunken toast, admitting that his wife has left him. Shaun agrees to work with Lea on the wedding plans after realizing she cannot shoulder the burden alone. Mateo arrives in America after getting his charges dropped and pursues a romantic relationship with Lim. Mateo helps her to reduce Sarah's surgical complications and Lim offers him a job. Meanwhile, Andrews, Morgan, Jordan, and Asher treat Salen Morrison, a clinic patient whose bizarre behavior hampers their efforts to treat her. Salen later admits that she was doing so deliberately, playing up her scleroderma symptoms to test the staff at St. Bonaventure. Glassman later informs Lim that Salen has purchased the hospital.
78	2	"Piece of Cake"	Tim Southam	Tracy Taylor & David Hoselton	October 4, 2021	502	3.73
Salen and her company, Ethicure, take over the hospital; Glassman considers resigning, but soon accepts a deal to continue working. Andrews, Jordan, and Mateo treat Madeline, a young woman with terminal cancer. At Shaun's suggestion, Mateo performs an experimental T-cell treatment. Andrews is removed from the case for arguing in front of Salen. Madeline struggles with the sudden return of her birth mother. The two reconcile with Mateo's encouragement, but Salen chastises Lim and Mateo for prioritizing Madeline's case over other "clients." Morgan and Park treat Abby, a mother in prison for murdering her first baby with antifreeze. Park becomes convinced Abby is innocent even after her new daughter, Maggie, develops the same symptoms, while Morgan believes she's guilty. When Abby is interrogated under anesthetic, Morgan changes her mind and helps Shaun and Park discover that the babies have a genetic disorder unknowingly triggered by Abby breastfeeding them. Maggie is saved while the doctors inform the authorities that Abby is innocent. Shaun struggles with choosing a wedding cake while Lea struggles with installing a computer system. Shaun experiences sensory overload due to some of Salen's new changes.
79	3	"Measure of Intelligence"	Anne Renton	Adam Scott Weissman & Thomas L. Moran	October 11, 2021	503	3.74
Andrews, Park, and Mateo treat a patient who has a chip placed in her head as part of an operation conducted by another doctor, but the company responsible wants to remove it from her. Shaun, Wolke, Jordan, and Lim treat a man who has severely damaged his face after crashing his bike. Both teams experience challenges to convince Salen that their approaches are worth taking however, despite some failure, Andrews settles on Mateo's solution and convinces Salen. Lea discovers that Shaun planned to invite his mother and feels conflicted about how to bring it up to him. Shaun confronts Salen about the many changes she has implemented to the hospital, notably towels and surgical uniforms, and Salen surprisingly agrees to go through with Shaun's demands. On the way home from the hospital, Lim and Mateo see a billboard outside the hospital sponsoring differences, with Shaun being pictured.
80	4	"Rationality"	David Straiton	Peter Blake & Tristan Thai	October 25, 2021	504	4.10
Shaun, Andrews, and Mateo treat Holly, a young girl whose father, Walt, has diagnosed her with visceral myopathy; after Walt is proven right, Salen orders the team to treat him like a consulting physician, causing Shaun to become dismissive and rude to the point that Andrews removes Shaun from the case. Although the team nearly has to remove most of Holly's intestines, Shaun prevents this by having them insert a feeding tube into her colon to relieve the pressure. Morgan and Park treat Gina, who desperately needs a lung transplant. The two argue over whether or not to allow Gina's estranged son Henry to be a donor against her wishes. Morgan reveals that she has been taking hormone injections in order to have her eggs frozen; Park begins helping her. Shaun attempts to make Salen remove the billboard; Glassman agrees to do some interviews in exchange for the billboard’s removal. When Holly reveals that she was inspired to seek Shaun's help from seeing the billboard, he agrees to keep the billboard up. When Glassman discovers that Lea has repaired the classic car that he has been working on, he takes off on a trip.
81	5	"Crazytown"	Rebecca Moline	Sam Chanse & Jessica Grasl	November 1, 2021	505	3.64
Shaun, Jordan, and Park treat Mr. Song, the victim of a hate crime who is diagnosed with a brain tumor; he refuses the surgery to remove it. After Song's condition worsens, Shaun convinces his daughter to approve the surgery; most of the tumor is removed and Song is left with permanent weakness on his left side, but he respects his daughter's decision. Lim and Asher treat Rosa, an ex-girlfriend of Mateo who was in Guatemala on a medical mission; Andrews later transfers Rosa to the county hospital instead, convinced that Lim is letting her feelings for Mateo get in the way. Lim successfully operates on Rosa at the other hospital; she learns details about Mateo and Rosa's failed relationship and decides to break up with him. Morgan attempts to get Park to elevate himself in the eyes of the medical community, but he declines. Shaun goes tux shopping, but Glassman does not show up as he had promised. After discovering that he has the lowest approval rating in the department, Shaun unsuccessfully attempts to improve it; Lea secretly deletes Shaun's bad reviews, improving his rating. Salen asks Andrews out and he accepts.
82	6	"One Heart"	Sarah Wayne Callies	April Fitzsimmons & David Renaud	November 15, 2021	506	3.70
Shaun, Asher, and Lim treat Brandon, a man with internal injuries from a fall. At the same time, Park treats Ollie, a young boy who needs a heart transplant in order to survive, for which Brandon is a match; as a result, Park and Shaun clash over their desires to save their respective patients. After accepting that Brandon can't be saved, Shaun figures out a way to save his heart using embroidery and Ollie is saved, along with 63 other people who also received organs. Morgan treats Nira, who has an optical tumor and may become a big donor to the hospital. Morgan takes as a chance to become the new head of the clinic; in order to make a profit, Morgan is forced to use a cheaper procedure that saves only sixty percent of Nira's eyesight. Andrews continues his relationship with Salen while Lea visits Glassman in Paradise, Montana and tries to convince him to return, which he refuses. Shaun and Park choose not to let the case come between their friendship, while Brandon's strained relationship with his father reminds Asher of his long-estranged relationship with his own father and he is inspired to read a letter from his father.
83	7	"Expired"	Mike Listo	Jim Adler & Mark Rozeman	November 22, 2021	507	4.22
Glassman receives a surprise visit from his ex-wife, Ilana Reeves, who wants him to have a look at her new husband, Sunil, who has Lewy Body dementia and signs of a tumor; he is hesitant, but decides to try. Ilana forgives him for their daughter’s death and advises him to stay in San Jose for Shaun. Glassman decides to operate on Sunil and removes his tumor successfully. After looking at a church for a wedding venue, Shaun and Lea stumble upon a multiple-vehicle accident. At St. Bonaventure, Shaun and Lim treat the woman who was involved, Alma Garcia, who is 26 weeks pregnant. She is forced to give birth surgically, but the medicine to treat the baby had expired. Despite Shaun's improvising, the baby dies due to a lack of oxygen. Lim confronts Salen about the expired medicine, but she advises her to act with "discretion" until an investigation is finalized. Shaun is furious because of both the expired medicine and Lea deleting his failed hospital reviews, and is comforted by Glassman as Lea watches them.
84	8	"Rebellion"	Gary Hawes	Thomas L. Moran	February 28, 2022	508	3.44
Salen has the pharmacist fired and has him sign a non-disclosure agreement. Lim decides to build a case against her, discovering that the hospital has not in effect been taken over completely by Salen yet. Salen later threatens her by saying she will remember her betrayal to go behind her back. Andrews, Asher, and Jordan treat a young woman who previously had surgery and is in pain. They manage to remove clots in her body that started to spread to her heart and other vital organs. Lim, Shaun, and Park treat Phil Hall, who crashed his car into a tree after a failed date. Shaun finds himself unable to forgive Lea and attempts to avoid her. Both she and Glassman attempt to convince him to give her a second chance; Shaun eventually does, but ruins it by bringing up something Lea said in the past, which upsets her again. Lea decides to move out.
85	9	"Yippee Ki-Yay"	Dinh Thai	David Hoselton & Adam Scott Weissman	March 7, 2022	509	3.48
After her fight with Shaun, Lea crashes with Jordan, who implores Shaun to let go of his doubts about Lea. Lim is demoted from her role as chief of surgery and the position is given to Andrews. She receives a job offer from another hospital, but declines. Instead, she enlists the other doctors to help her take down Salen; Park and Glassman agree to partake while Shaun, Jordan, and Morgan refuse. The team treats Nelly Dunn, a pop singer who can only speak using her electrolarynx. Although Shaun warns against the surgery to restore her voice, she opts to have it anyways and almost bleeds out, but survives due to her clotting factors. They also treat Joe, a man caring for Cody, his son with Kabuki syndrome. Joe decides to undergo a surgery that, if successful, would restore the use of his arm, but instead leaves him paraplegic. Cody suffers a panic attack, landing him in the ICU. Morgan discovers a small tumor on Cody’s pancreas; once they remove it, he is able to walk. Shaun and Lea reconcile and continue their relationship; disgusted with how Salen changed Andrews for the worse, Shaun quits his job.
86	10	"Cheat Day"	Mike Listo	Peter Blake & Tracy Taylor	March 14, 2022	510	3.66
Glassman and Lea encourage Shaun to continue working to protect his reputation, which he does, vowing to focus on the medicine. Returning to work, Shaun assists Park with a man who has hurt his head, but they later discover he suffers from cancer due to a liver donated by his friend. Salen hinders Lim and her supporters' scheme by having her and Glassman immediately fired and Asher's and Park's residencies terminated. Andrews assures Lim he is standing up with them against Salen. Asher and Jordan treat a surrogate mother, Grace, whose giving birth is complicated by a tumor; along with Andrews, they manage to conduct a surgery to save both her and the baby. A successful surgery grants Shaun and Park's patient with a cancerous liver more months to live. Shaun decides to join Lim's rebellion and hold a speech at the conference of the pension investors. Salen has already said that she intends to sack the hospital board after the pension conference. However, while gathering for the conference, Andrews confronts her with his past failed treatments, forcing her to resign and leave St. Bonaventure instead of releasing those details. Andrews becomes the president of the hospital and reinstates the former personnel.
87	11	"The Family"	Mina Shum	David Renaud & Jessica Grasl	March 21, 2022	511	3.84
Andrews reinstates Lim as the Chief of Surgery, but has to shut down the clinic due to Morgan's revelation to Nira. Morgan works on becoming a better person, managing to save the clinic before returning it to Glassman, as she isn't ready for the responsibility yet. The Liu family's serious car accident brings them to the hospital, forcing Lim, Andrews, and Glassman to work together to save the parents. However, they struggle due to their anger at each other over how they handled Salen; they eventually reconcile, saving Elaine Liu's life. Shaun treats Isla Liu, who bonds with him; he opens up about his unborn daughter and Steve's death while comforting her. When Isla worsens, Shaun operates on her with only Jordan's help to stabilize her until Andrews can take over. Shaun and Lea postpone their wedding for now, but Shaun makes Lea a placeholder ring, inspired by Isla. At the end of the day, the three seasoned doctors go for drinks while Shaun remains reluctant to form personal connections with his patients, despite bonding with Isla.
88	12	"Dry Spell"	Bosede Williams	April Fitzsimmons & Sam Chanse	March 28, 2022	512	3.86
Shaun attempts to devise a plan to have sex with Lea after a nine-day hiatus and dry spell, seeking advice from his colleagues and Glassman. Lim, Park, and Asher treat Mariel Torres, who collapsed at the airport, and they discover a fungus in her lungs. During surgery, it bursts and starts leaking into her blood system, postponing a secondary surgery on her kidneys. Torres reveals to her boyfriend that she is an undocumented immigrant and he distances himself before later forgiving her and returning to her side. Shaun and Jordan treat 45-year-old Stanford professor Brenna, who has hemorrhoids. She later leaves her room and Jordan learns that she is a virgin who was due to be on a date with a former research friend. She arranges for him to come to the hospital for them to have sex. Glassman asks Andrews to listen to his staff's complaints regarding the hospital's condition, after he isolated himself in order to focus on economic recovery. Asher is asked out on a date by nurse Jerome.
89	13	"Growing Pains"	Cayman Grant	Jim Adler	April 4, 2022	513	3.66
Asher and Shaun treat 17-year-old Trent who has an infection in one of his fingers due to one of his many biohacking implants. Their efforts to treat his growing pain are hindered by Trent's troubling relationship with his mother as a result of his father leaving them. Although she is skeptical of his interests, Trent's mother eventually allows him to undergo an experimental operation proposed by Shaun in order for Trent to keep his hand. When Lea approaches Jordan for help regarding a sensor project, Shaun comes with a set of rules for her to follow while in their home. Reznick approaches Glassman for help regarding a controversial procedure for Kayla Quinn to help with her major depressive disorder, which he reluctantly agrees to do, only for the operation to be stopped by Kayla's brother Justin, her conservator. Learning that Kayla's brother has been controlling her life, Reznick tries to convince him to accept the operation, but it takes an attack from Kayla against her own brother for him to accept the reality of her wishes. Park and Reznick consider buying a new place for themselves; while Morgan is all in, Park is hesitant due to money issues, which Morgan eventually deduces as him taking too much pride in himself.
90	14	"Potluck"	Rebecca Moline	Mark Rozeman	April 11, 2022	514	3.99
After a potluck at the hospital, most of the staff begins acting strangely, leaving Glassman, Shaun, Morgan, and Jordan in charge; Morgan, Lea, and Asher eventually realize that Asher and Jerome accidentally used magic mushrooms in their sweet potatoes. During this time, Asher becomes insecure when Jerome doesn't want him to meet his college friends, Park is worried that he and Morgan are too opposite to work, Lim hallucinates snakes, and Andrews thinks that he's Spider-Man. Shaun and Glassman's differing ways of doing things causes them to clash until Jordan suggests that they could both learn a lot from each other's methods; during a complicated surgery, Glassman gives Shaun the lead after he comes up with an innovative solution to save their patient while Jordan gets her first solo surgery when Park needs an emergency appendectomy. In the end, Morgan and Park find a solution for their argument over his recliner, but Morgan keeps to herself Park's earlier worries about their relationship. Jerome admits that he's afraid of showing Asher his less serious side which Asher, having had to live a mostly rigid life, looks forward to enjoying. Andrews and Lim open up to each other and later watch Spider-Man 2 together.
91	15	"My Way"	Aaron Rottinghaus	Adam Scott Weissman & Tristan Thai	April 18, 2022	515	3.77
Lim and Shaun attend to an elderly woman in an iron lung, Joan, who is scheduled to have lung surgery when the iron lung suddenly fails. Lea goes out with Joan's roommate Sophie to find spare parts to fix the iron lung, going through quite the effort trying to get an engine from a 1938 Chevrolet. Despite the lung now being fixed, Joan is suffering from a rupture in one of her inner lungs. After one operation, she's reluctant to go through with the surgery. Sophie manages to convince her otherwise by letting her meet the students she lectured to, telling her about how she inspired them. Andrews and Reznick treat a young boy, Kevin, who injured himself at his all-boys home. Andrews suspects that he's being abused, but Kevin is withdrawn about the issue. They bond over a shared interest of painters and their artwork. Kevin deliberately rips out his stitches in order to stay at the hospital longer. Andrews tries to be assured that Kevin will be looked after, admitting they both have dyslexia during another heart-to-heart. He allows Kevin to stay another week while a new foster home is found for him.
92	16	"The Shaun Show"	David Straiton	Tracy Taylor	May 2, 2022	516	3.68
As a film crew follows Shaun and Lea around, Shaun and Park are given their own surgical cases to test whether or not they are prepared to become attendings. A fire leaves Shaun treating Dana Bradley for facial burns and Park treating Grant Ferlin, a firefighter, for a fractured spine; Shaun makes a mistake during Dana’s debridement, worsening her condition, while Grant refuses a spinal fusion, wishing to preserve his career. Park enlists Lim's help to perform an alternative surgery, but Grant’s declining condition ultimately forces him to perform the spinal fusion. Dana and her daughter struggle with her mutilated face; Sophie and Jordan convince the two that it will make them both stronger. Alongside Jordan, Shaun successfully corrects his mistake and allows Sophie to use the footage. Nurse Villanueva tells Lim that she's a victim of domestic violence and Lim promises to help her. The staff throws a party for Shaun and Lea; Claire shows up to sing for them.
93	17	"The Lea Show"	Steven DePaul	David Hoselton & David Renaud	May 9, 2022	517	3.08
Sophie's documentary changes focus to Lea and her wedding plans. Claire temporarily returns to the hospital to assist with a tumor surgery on a young boy, Lucho, whom she brought from Guatemala for better care. Andrews and Lim sort the doctors into teams to remove the tumors in Lucho's brain, heart, and kidneys. Following the first surgery, Shaun concludes that they should have operated on Lucho's brain first, admitting that Lucho could die. While passing a strip club, Shaun realises that they could use lasers to aid in the surgery, which proves successful. Claire tells Lim that she has been offered the chief of surgery position back in Guatemala, but remains hesitant. Lim still encourages her to take the position, noting that Claire helped her to be a better leader. Shaun and Lea cancel their wedding at the last second, agreeing that the style isn't for them. Nurse Villanueva offers her resignation to Lim, but she declines it; Lim asks her to temporarily live with her and Villanueva accepts.
94	18	"Sons"	David Shore	Teleplay by : David Shore & Jessica Grasl & Nathalie Touboul; Story by : Jessica Grasl & Nathalie Touboul	May 16, 2022	518	3.45
Park and Morgan treat Steph, a young woman paralyzed by a stroke. A lung operation results in Steph losing the limited amount of control that she had over her right hand. Morgan suggests they create a device attached to Steph's brain to allow her to communicate. Lea programs it using Steph’s voice; the surgery is successful. Asher's estranged father Yosel comes to the hospital, seeking his son's help to treat his terminal lung cancer. Shaun comes up with a treatment that could give Yosel up to a year; otherwise, Yosel has days to weeks left to live. After Jordan confronts Asher about his lack of empathy for his father, Asher convinces his mother to honor Yosel's wish to go home to die. Asher and Yosel make peace with each other. Morgan gets a job offer in New York and is conflicted at first, but ultimately decides to take it. Shaun and Lea get married in a ceremony arranged by Glassman on the hospital rooftop, presided over and attended by their friends. Glassman and Shaun acknowledge their own father-son relationship while preparing. During the wedding, Lim and Villanueva are stabbed by Owen, Villanueva's ex, leaving their fates unknown.

=== Season 6 (2022–23) ===
No. overall	No. in season	Title	Directed by	Written by	Original release date	Prod. code	U.S. viewers (millions)
95	1	"Afterparty"	Mike Listo	Peter Blake	October 3, 2022	519	3.54
Lim manages to call Andrews, who locks down the hospital. Shaun, Andrews, Glassman, and Jordan operate on Lim and Villanueva with the help of Jerome and Lea but argue over the best course of treatment to the point that Shaun defies Glassman's plan. Owen takes Asher, Morgan, and a patient, Ezra, hostage, complicated when Ezra needs emergency bowel surgery. Morgan convinces Owen to release her and Ezra. A remorseful Owen hands Asher his bullets before attempting to commit suicide by cop, resulting in both Owen and Lim needing heart bypass. Shaun has a tantrum and struggles emotionally because Lim's condition reminds him of losing Steve. He hallucinates Steve who encourages him to let go of his guilt, allowing him to focus and save Lim. Everybody injured in the attack survives and Owen is arrested. Lea's support during the crisis strengthens her and Shaun's relationship while Asher and Jerome admit their love for each other for the first time. Morgan turns down the job in New York, but Park maintains that she puts her career over their relationship, so they break up. After regaining consciousness, Lim is discovered to be paralyzed from the waist down.
96	2	"Change of Perspective"	Anne Renton	April Fitzsimmons & Thomas L. Moran	October 10, 2022	520	3.18
On their first day as surgical attendings, Shaun and Park have to deal with a heart transplant and a neck tumor, respectively. Shaun's decision to perform a xenotransplant puts him at odds with new resident Dr. Danica "Danni" Powell, nearly leading him to fire her before changing his mind, while Park's patient Jeremiah is a shut-in who Jordan and Dr. Daniel "Danny" Perez try to help socialize more. When a pig, Wilbur, is brought in for the transplant, the staff struggles to go through with it before being saved by the arrival of a compatible human donor; Jordan and Danny later convince Jeremiah to adopt Wilbur. Jordan and Danny display an attraction to each other while Morgan and Park struggle in the aftermath of their breakup. Lim struggles to adjust to her paralysis and continuing her role as a surgeon, aided by Glassman who joins her at physical therapy due to his back problems. Lim later suffers an emotional breakdown about her condition, blaming Shaun whose risky surgery to save her liver may have caused her paralysis.
97	3	"A Big Sign"	Rebecca Moline	Liz Friedman & Jessica Grasl	October 17, 2022	601	3.00
Shaun, Asher, and Danny treat Julianne, a marriage counselor with a brain tumor; during the surgery to remove it, Julianne has what she believes to be a near-death experience, which Shaun believes to be a symptom of another tumor. Although Julianne considers dying to be with her husband, Danny convinces her to undergo surgery. However, she dies on the operating table with an autopsy confirming the second tumor. Park, Jordan, and Danni treat Katie, a girl with bipolar disorder whose parents disagree about her treatment; after Katie escapes due to Danni removing her restraints, Park realizes that she actually has hydrocephalus, which resulted in a misdiagnosis. Katie is successfully treated while Danni helps her parents reconcile by revealing how her leg amputation nearly tore her own family apart. During the episode, Julianne gives Shaun, Lea, Asher, and Jerome relationship advice. Asher notices Jordan's crush on Danny and helps her out, causing her to eventually accept the crush. Lim performs her own investigation into her paralysis and Glassman admits his anger towards Shaun for performing the procedure against his orders, but he doesn't think that both Shaun and Lim are wrong. Lim confronts Shaun and ends their friendship, but promises to remain professional with him in their work.
98	4	"Shrapnel"	Allison Liddi Brown	Thomas L. Moran & Tristan Thai	October 24, 2022	602	3.20
Shaun, Asher, and Danni treat Charlie, who got shrapnel in his arm during a military reenactment. Damage caused during surgery makes it appear as if his arm must be amputated, but Shaun finds a solution. Asher asks about Danni's military career, at first unintentionally offending her; after they make up, Danni opens up to him about it. Park, Jordan, and Danny treat Andy, a young man whose foot was severed while skinny dipping. Park works to keep the leg viable while the police search for Andy's missing foot with Jordan and Danny present; the foot is eventually found and successfully reattached. Andy's dating woes remind Park of his own issues. Danny and Jordan grow closer, but Danny suddenly aborts a kiss and leaves. Lim enjoys a day off, growing closer to the neighbor that she had vented to about Shaun. Struggling in the aftermath of Lim ending their friendship, Shaun exhibits strange behavior, including turning a storage room into his office, and clashes with Glassman who accuses Shaun of isolating himself, although Glassman is the one purposefully avoiding Shaun. At night, while thinking about Charlie's surgery, Shaun has an epiphany and discovers a solution to Lim's paralysis.
99	5	"Growth Opportunities"	Daniel Dae Kim	Peter Blake	October 31, 2022	603	3.36
Shaun, Asher, and Danni treat Skylar, a musically talented young girl with liver failure from a genetic disorder; Skylar's illness reveals that she is the product of an affair between her mother and her father's former roommate Mick who is the only compatible donor for Skylar. Mick refuses, but reconsiders once Lea shows him a video of his daughter performing. Park, Jordan, and Danny treat Chris, a man with pancreatic cancer who is the caretaker of his brother Ollie who has a traumatic brain injury. Chris' cancer turns out to be terminal and he struggles with being honest with Ollie until Danny shares the story of how his family's love helped Danny's drug-addict brother become sober. Jordan realizes the story is actually about Danny. Danny admits that he can't date her because he needs to focus on his sobriety and becoming a surgeon. Lim spends time with her neighbor, only to discover that he never thought of her in a romantic way. Shaun reveals that Lim's paralysis is from a spinal column deformity and Andrews has him and Glassman work together to come up with a solution. Glassman shoots down Shaun's ideas until Lea reminds him of his struggles with his daughter Maddie. Together, the two are able to come up with a solution, but Danni encourages Lim to turn down the surgery, devastating Shaun. Shaun later shares his story with Chris and Ollie in the hopes of helping them.
100	6	"Hot and Bothered"	David Shore	David Hoselton & David Renaud	November 21, 2022	604	3.09
During a heatwave, Shaun and Danni work on a case together, but Shaun struggles to work with her after finding out she advised Lim not to do the surgery that he proposed. Danni keeps contradicting him during their work and he shoots down her ideas. After their recent arguing, Shaun removes her from the case but, after his patient wants Danni back on and Glassman advises him to find common ground with her, he and Danni resolve their issues and they save the patient. The rest of the staff treat elderly patients when the hospital has a blackout during the heatwave, losing some but saving many. Lea and Andrews work together to restore the power. Danni brings Lim to a disability basketball game, which helps her connect with people who share her condition. The episode concludes with a 100th birthday for one of the elderly patients, a nod to the show's 100th episode mark.
101	7	"A Through F"	Mike Listo	Garrett Lerner & Adam Scott Weissman	November 28, 2022	605	3.32
Andrews' ex-wife Isabel brings in Gena Cooper who gives birth to sextuplets; Andrews assigns a team of doctors to each of the babies. Lim's date Clay helps her find a solution to her and Danni's patient. Glassman and Jordan clash over their case before coming together to find a solution. Morgan and Park successfully treat two of the babies together, while Shaun faces memories of Lea's miscarriage while treating one of the babies with Danny. Ultimately, all six babies survive despite their various medical issues and many of the staff volunteer to help the parents at home. Morgan reveals her search for a sperm donor to Park, but both admit that it would hurt too much to have a baby together while broken up. Morgan accepts Park's help in finding a suitable donor instead. Lea and Shaun are excited at the idea of possibly having a baby, only to discover that the damage from Lea's miscarriage means she may never be able to safely have a child. Jerome reveals that he wants a big family, which is in contrast to Asher who doesn't want kids. Asher changes his mind after seeing Jerome with one of the babies. Andrews and Isabel make amends and clearly retain feelings for each other.
102	8	"Sorry, Not Sorry"	Bosede Williams	Tracy Taylor & Sam Chanse	December 5, 2022	606	3.22
Morgan, Park, and Jordan treat Toni, a victim of sexual assault who resists the idea of getting a rape kit done. After pressuring Toni, Morgan eventually reveals that she is a rape survivor herself; opening up about her own trauma and regrets gets Toni to agree. Shaun, Asher, and Glassman treat Naveen, a woman who has an infection due to a retained surgical towel. Naveen's wife has to make the difficult choice of consenting to a full hysterectomy despite fears that her wife will never forgive her, which prove to be unfounded. Andrews and Villanueva treat Gwendolyn who needs to have forehead bumps removed; Villanueva rebukes Andrews for his impersonal approach to the case. When Andrews performs the surgery himself, a more personal talent allows him to fully succeed. Afterwards, Andrews and Villanueva go out for dinner. Recognizing that her relationship with Danny will probably never turn romantic, Jordan decides to move on, causing Danny to kiss her. Naveen's case reminds Shaun of his strained relationship with Lim and Glassman urges them to make amends with each other. The two finally open up to each other and Shaun apologizes for the pain that he's caused her while Lim, although still angry sometimes, agrees to work on mending their friendship. Shaun moves back into his and Park's shared office and Glassman notices signs that suggest Lim is starting to recover from her paralysis.
103	9	"Broken or Not"	Mike Listo	Jim Adler & Jeff Qiu	December 12, 2022	607	3.56
Shaun implements a new rating system, putting Danny and Danni into a competition with each other as they treat Teddy, a young man with bulimia; Teddy's struggles remind Danny of his own problems and he helps Teddy reconcile with his brother. Park, Morgan, Jordan, and Asher treat Park's new girlfriend Lilly who has a sinus infection that has spread to her brain, leading to renewed clashing between Park and Morgan before they come up with a solution together. Morgan admits that she's worried they are falling back into their old relationship when nothing has changed, with even Lilly noticing the obvious feelings remaining between the two. Lea wants to buy a fixer-upper before she and Shaun agree to find a house that they both like. At the end of the day, Shaun throws out his new rating system. Lim agrees to undergo surgery to fix her spine and Clay makes an open-ended marriage proposal to her. While getting a hand injury treated, Lea finds out that she's pregnant again, leaving her worried about the dangers. Paying a visit to Danny, Jordan discovers him unconscious on the floor, having relapsed on heroin.
104	10	"Quiet and Loud"	James Genn	Jessica Grasl & Nathalie Touboul	January 23, 2023	608	3.29
Three months later, Lim can walk with a cane, Lea's pregnancy is progressing, Danny returns to work under conditions, and Morgan prepares for her embryo implantation while trying to maintain a professional relationship with Park. Shaun enlists Glassman and Lim to fix a pregnancy complication, but isolates Lea in his attempts to protect her until Asher calls him out on it. Morgan, Park, Danny, and Jordan treat Drew, a young Gardner's syndrome patient who needs a small bowel transplant as well as a new abdominal wall. Although the surgery is successful, Drew admits that he agreed to the surgery because he doesn't want to leave his mom alone. Park admits he is conflicted about missing the chance to be with Morgan, as she's an amazing mother. Danny distances himself from Jordan as he's afraid of risking his sobriety by falling for her when he's not ready for a relationship yet. Lea begins bleeding and is rushed into emergency surgery as Shaun's friends gather to support them. Glassman and Lim have trouble finding the source of the bleeding and prepare to perform a hysterectomy, but are able to save both Lea and the baby after finding the source of the ruptured vessel tethered to scar tissue from her Asherman syndrome. Lea and Shaun learn they are having a son. Lim decides not to accept Clay's proposal, but instead proposes that they move in together, which he accepts.
105	11	"The Good Boy"	Gary Hawes	Melaina Wright & Peter Blake	January 30, 2023	609	3.43
While on their babymoon, Shaun and Lea witness a dog get hit by a car and Lea becomes emotionally involved, demanding that Shaun find a surgery to fix the dog's injuries. With Glassman's help, Shaun is able to save him. The two decide to adopt the dog before his family arrives to pick him up, having seen Lea's flyers. Lea admits to Glassman her fears about being a mother and Glassman opens up to Lea about Maddie and reassures her. Andrews, Park, Jordan, and Morgan treat Lalo, an immigrant with twenty spikes in his body, causing Park and Morgan to clash over whether or not to amputate his arm. They ultimately manage to save Lalo without taking his arm. Park opens up to Morgan about his fears of losing Kellan while Morgan reveals that her implantation failed; the two promise to be there for each other. Danni's friend Vince comes to her to secretly treat a gunshot wound, afraid of violating his parole; Danni ends up dragging Asher and Lim into it when Vince's condition worsens. As a result, Asher is placed on probation while Danni is fired. A sympathetic Lim disposes of the bullet so Vince won't go back to prison, leaving Danni satisfied as she has saved her friend, someone who had been there for her when she lost her leg.
106	12	"365 Degrees"	Rebecca Moline	Thomas L. Moran & David Renaud	February 6, 2023	610	3.14
Lim, Asher, and Danny treat Bob, a long-term patient of Lim's who is in heart failure. Asher disagrees with Lim's proposed surgery, believing it too risky, and Danny refuses to back him up despite his own doubts. Ultimately, Asher proves to be right, but he and Lim are able to find a solution together that will buy Bob time to find a suitable donor heart. Shaun and Jordan treat Kelly, a 13-year-old girl who has a tumor as a result of having had sex. Shaun and Jordan clash over whether or not to report Kelly's mother for allowing her daughter to have sex while underage. Jordan reveals to Lea that she has been celibate for years out of choice. Despite some complications, the two successfully remove the tumor, but they both urge Kelly to reconsider her choices. Morgan finds herself caught between a great career opportunity and her desire to become a mother; Morgan at first turns down the promotion, but Andrews convinces her that Morgan is capable of doing both. After having a rough week, Danny nearly relapses, but attends church instead. Seeing her friend's distress, Jordan sits with him as they watch the choir sing. With his house undergoing termite extermination, Glassman temporarily moves in with Shaun and Lea, revealing that he and Shaun share a number of habits. However, Glassman's house later burns down.
107	13	"39 Differences"	Cayman Grant	David Hoselton & Tristan Thai	February 13, 2023	611	3.09
Shaun, Asher, and Danny treat Ricky, a boy with naegleria fowleri whose parents' marriage is being torn apart by their inability to agree on how to raise him. When Ricky's condition worsens, they are forced to remove a small piece of his brain to save Ricky's life, although he doesn't appear to suffer any negative side effects from it. Park helps Morgan with her first clinical trial patients, only for one, Mr. Riggs, to have a preexisting condition, causing Morgan to believe that he either lied to get into the trial or the screeners were incompetent. Park determines that Riggs' condition was previously undetected due to his being a lifelong blood donor suppressing the symptoms, causing Morgan to rethink her cynicism. Lim's long-term cystic fibrosis patient Breka's new lungs arrive with pneumonia and Lim desperately tries to save them with Jordan's help. Lim's refusal to give up even when it seems hopeless ultimately proves successful and Breka is saved. Shaun worries that his and Lea's differences of opinion over raising their child will tear them apart, especially after seeing Ricky's parents, while a despondent Glassman sorts through the ruins of his house and the memories he had there. The three share a touching moment when they feel the baby kick together. Shaun and Lea begin to work out their differences while Glassman looks forward to making new memories with his adopted family.
108	14	"Hard Heart"	James Genn	Garrett Lerner	February 27, 2023	612	3.12
Shaun, Park, and Danny treat Nathan, a young boy with moyamoya disease whose predicament hits Park hard as a parent while Shaun has trouble connecting with him as more than a patient. Rather than put Nathan through multiple brain surgeries, Park and Shaun find a single solution and Shaun displays empathy for Nathan by wrapping his toy dog's head in bandages to make him feel better. Jordan, Lim, and Asher treat Evelyn Allen, Jordan's grandmother, leading to Jordan clashing with Lim over the best treatment for her coconut heart. Jordan admits that she has self-confidence issues and desperately seeks her grandmother's approval; Evelyn reassures Jordan that she's always been proud of her and Jordan finds a solution for the problem. Inspired by her grandmother, Jordan agrees to host an online mentorship program. After being repeatedly late, Danny is inspired by Evelyn to start his own NA meeting at the hospital with Nurse Hawkes joining him. Glassman goes overboard in his preparations for the baby, causing Shaun and Lea to kick him out. However, Shaun reassures Glassman that he will be the baby's grandfather, something that Glassman thought that he would never get to be, and Glassman becomes Shaun and Lea's neighbor instead.
109	15	"Old Friends"	Mike Listo	Adam Scott Weissman	March 6, 2023	614	3.33
Sonja is a pregnant woman whose condition puts both her and her baby Esther's lives in jeopardy. Morgan and Jordan disagree as to whether halting the pregnancy is the best option, whereas Sonja is ready to risk her life for a slim chance at saving her baby. Jordan finally convinces Sonja to opt for an abortion by telling her about her own, but she first arranges for Esther to be baptized. Park hesitantly treats Joe, the man who tarnished his marriage and who now seeks Park's forgiveness. Park saves Joe and forgives him after Morgan helps him realize his refusal to let things go destroyed their relationship. Jared Kalu, now a concierge doctor, returns to St. Bonaventure in quest of Shaun's aid to treat Roland Barnes, the fifth-richest man in the world. Shaun and Jared discover tapeworm larva in Roland's brain, impressing him so much that he offers a hundred-million-dollar donation. With Shaun's encouragement, Jared asks Lim to resume his residency and she allows him to join Shaun's team, but Jared will have to be a first-year resident again. Furious about losing Jared, Roland tears up his donation. Morgan continues to try IVF, with Lim and Jordan helping her with the third round. Glassman shops for new furniture with Lea, who struggles with the idea of having to give up her sports car for the baby's safety; the two later surprise Shaun with a new sports car that will be safe for the baby. Shaun receives the news that he's being sued for malpractice.
110	16	"The Good Lawyer"	Ruben Fleischer	David Shore & Liz Friedman	March 13, 2023	613	3.41
Shaun is sued by Bob Patton, a man whose hand he amputated after Shaun and Park found Bob and his sister in the aftermath of a car crash. Bob contends the amputation was unnecessary; Park expresses his own reservations. Glassman refers Shaun to his lawyer friend Janet Stewart for aid, but Shaun chooses Joni DeGroot, a lawyer in Janet's firm who has OCD, complicating Joni's ability to practice law. Despite Janet and Glassman's advice to settle, Shaun decides to go to trial. Despite a rocky start, Joni uses Bob's expert witness testimony to their advantage, exposing his lack of remorse for causing the accident in the first place. Shaun testifies about his decision to amputate as well as his past, resulting in a victory. Joni tells Shaun that her OCD was triggered at an early age by her father's death, followed by her family being torn before Janet intervened to save them, inspiring Joni to become a lawyer. After the trial, Shaun and Joni check Bob's hand to determine whether he was medically correct, a test he had paused earlier in the process to avoid having to give the prosecution the results in discovery.
111	17	"Second Chances and Past Regrets"	Mina Shum	Tracy Taylor & Jeff Qiu	March 20, 2023	615	3.48
Carter, a boy with an inverted heart, is treated by Park, Asher, and Lim as his mother Bianca struggles to make amends for deserting him years ago. Despite complications, the three are able to repair Carter's heart and Bianca reconciles with her own mother. Shaun, Jared, and Jordan care for Yara, a young girl suffering from uncontrollable laughter caused by a benign brain tumor. Jared's zeal to prove himself causes him to take shortcuts, placing him at odds with Shaun, who struggles to balance being Jared's boss and his friend. Jared entices Yara to speak to her mom about her difficulties and she agrees to a tumor removal procedure that is successfully carried out by Shaun, Jordan, Jared, and Glassman. Shaun and Jared decide upon their respective professional and personal limits after seeking counsel from Glassman and Jordan but, when Jared discloses that Glassman missed two sutures while closing Yara, Shaun shows signs of concern. Asher grapples with the realization that Jerome has kept his HIV status from him. Asher reconciles with Jerome after witnessing Carter's family's difficulties and the two have fun sharing all of their secrets with each other.
112	18	"A Blip"	Phillip Rhys Chaudhary	Sam Chanse	April 3, 2023	616	3.35
Shaun investigates why Glassman missed two sutures from the previous episode's surgery and discovers signs that his brain cancer has returned. He asks Glassman to have another MRI, which he initially refuses, but eventually accepts after Shaun admits he is scared of losing him just as he is becoming a father. Jared and Jordan treat Daphne Garcia, who is diagnosed with sleep apnea after a physical scan. Daphne becomes septic while undergoing dialysis. Jordan convinces her to have a surgery which will help her condition. Shaun, Asher, Danny, and Lim treat Harper Decrane, who has brain fog, breathing and heart issues due to long COVID. They discover that she has Tetralogy of Fallot a heart condition which was previously left untreated and could claim her life. She decides to undergo surgery and makes it through with minor complications. Daniel sees Jordan and Jared almost kiss.
113	19	"Half Measures"	Freddie Highmore	David Renaud	April 10, 2023	617	3.40
Brady is a patient who was nearly cut in half by a piece of metal. Andrews argues for amputation of his lower half while Lim wants to save it, causing the two doctors to clash, straining their relationship, especially when Andrews still distrusts Jared over their previous conflict. While trying to find a solution, Jared and Danny clash over Jared's overly cautious attitude. Jared later admits to Asher that his attempts at an experimental surgery to save a cancer patient resulted in the patient's death, causing his caution out of guilt and fear of repeating his mistakes. Working together, Jared and Danny are able to find a solution to successfully save Brady's lower half. Danny admits that he is jealous of the growing relationship between Jordan and Jared while Jordan struggles with having feelings for both men. Shaun, Morgan, and Park successfully treat Eden, a baby with Turner syndrome. However, Eden's mother dies of a post-partum infection. Having bonded with the baby, Morgan puts off a meeting with her gynecologist about embryo implantation to spend time with Eden. Glassman's MRI reveals a lesion on his brain and he spends time with Shaun helping to pick out a crib and offering parenting advice. While tests confirm that the lesion isn't cancerous, Glassman misses a step putting the crib together, confirming there is something wrong with his brain.
114	20	"Blessed"	Gary Hawes	Thomas L. Moran & Jim Adler	April 17, 2023	618	3.48
Andrews, Jordan, and Asher treat Eddie Richter, a carpenter friend of Andrews who has wart-like growths over his body. His affiliation with religion makes Asher skeptical and rant in front of Jerome, who later distances himself from him, noting that Asher didn't respect his opinion and views. Andrews decides to go ahead with a risky surgery for Eddie, which he survives at first, but he then dies from a blood clot afterwards. Asher manages to reel Jerome back in and apologizes in front of his friends. Shaun decides to observe Glassman treating a patient alongside Jared and Danny. Along the way, Shaun questions Glassman's every move, which frustrates him. When Glassman opts for a brain surgery for his patient, Shaun remarks that it's risky, but Glassman manages to successfully conduct it despite his concerns. However, his concerns continue after the surgery when Glassman speaks to the patient. After social services' numerous failed attempts to have Eden adopted, Morgan decides to adopt her herself while simultaneously stopping her IVF treatment. Shaun shows Lim a scan of Glassman's brain, which features a spot he believes is permanently damaged brain tissue from a mini-stroke. Lim concludes that Glassman ought not to perform surgeries again due to his executive function now being impaired.
115	21	"A Beautiful Day"	Steven DePaul	David Hoselton & Peter Blake	April 24, 2023	619	3.69
Lim moves to take Glassman off surgeries, but he resists and threatens to sue. Lim manages to reach a compromise with Andrews. Shaun, Jordan, and Danny treat a man who suffered a head injury in a car accident. They discover that he has a tumor in his brain, but he initially declines the surgery due to his personality shift towards his daughter. Shaun reluctantly asks Glassman to help convince the man to have the surgery. Shaun's constant oversight of Glassman forces him to remove him from the case and Lim takes over as supervisor. During the last leg of the surgery, Glassman forgets the next steps and withdraws from the surgery. Andrews and Park treat Nico, a little boy with terminal cancer. They opt for surgery, but complications discovered during preoperative tests makes him ineligible for surgery. Park outlines a second option which is approved, but they discover another setback with Nico's cancer having spread to his liver. Nico's father admits he feels he failed as a father, but finally accepts Nico's fate; Andrews later builds a Christmas market to fulfil Nico's greatest wish. Morgan settles in as a mother and is helped by Park along the way, but the pressure becomes too much. She eventually manages to work out a suitable approach based on Park's advice.
116	22	"Love's Labor"	Mike Listo	Jessica Grasl & Garrett Lerner	May 1, 2023	620	3.87
While transporting a patient to the hospital, Danny, Jared, and Jerome are involved in a multi-vehicle crash that leaves Danny seriously injured. Due to his addiction, Danny refuses pain medication, but Jordan is forced to give it to him when Danny's pain threatens his life. Although Danny ultimately forgives Jordan, he decides to move back to Texas to recover with his family's help and support to avoid relapsing, but he first goes on a makeshift date with Jordan. Asher pulls Shaun in to help with a family and is devastated when the father suddenly dies of an aortic dissection despite Asher and Shaun's best efforts. Lim enlists Glassman's help with treating an internal decapitation patient and she urges him to reconcile with Shaun. Struggling to balance being a mother and her work, Morgan decides to resign. After being reminded by his patient what matters most, Park reunites with Morgan to raise Eden as a family. After being pressured by the board to choose between his job and his relationship with Villanueva, Andrews decides to resign. Lea gives birth to baby Steven Aaron Murphy and, although Glassman doesn't attend, he sends Shaun the gift of an embroidered blanket for the baby.

=== Season 7 (2024) ===
No. overall	No. in season	Title	Directed by	Written by	Original release date	Prod. code	U.S. viewers (millions)
117	1	"Baby, Baby, Baby"	Rebecca Moline	Liz Friedman & Jessica Grasl	February 20, 2024	701	2.86
Shaun and Lea clash over how to handle baby Steve, who is now two weeks old. Shaun returns to work and joins Lim in treating baby Jack Pierce, who desperately needs a new heart. However, complications arise when Morgan's adopted daughter Eden needs a new heart, as well. Shaun is forced to make the difficult decision to give the heart to the sicker Jack, but he comes up with a plan to transplant Jack's healthy valves into Eden in order to save her. Although there are some minor complications, both surgeries are successful. Morgan attempts to handle everything herself rather than relying on Park but, after he confronts her about it, she changes her mind, even referring to Eden as their child. Jordan struggles with feelings of isolation after Danny's return to Texas, but goes out to eat with Jared after the case. Following Andrews' departure, both Glassman and Lim attempt to get the other elected interim president of the hospital, resulting in them becoming co-interim presidents instead. Although Glassman is still at odds with Shaun, he takes Steve to let Shaun and Lea get some sleep and introduces himself as the baby's grandfather.
118	2	"Skin in the Game"	Freddie Highmore	Garrett Lerner & Nathalie Touboul	February 27, 2024	702	2.52
Shaun, Jared, Jordan, and new autistic med student Charlie Lukaitis treat a man named Rich who has silicosis and needs new lungs. Charlie idolizes Shaun, but her constant mistakes rub Shaun the wrong way. Charlie finds out that Rich's daughter Grace is a sex worker, which causes Rich to back out of the surgery when she tells him. Shaun convinces Rich to accept his daughter, regardless of what she does for a living. Park, Asher, and another newbie, Charlie's friend Dominick Hubank, deal with Sal, a gambling addict with a brain tumour. Park is distrustful of Sal, but decides to do the surgery on him; the surgery is successful, but he doesn't keep his promise to quit gambling. Lea struggles with giving Steve formula instead of breast milk and bonds with Morgan over how challenging motherhood is. Glassman and Lim keep trying to outdo each other on their first day as interim co-presidents, but they eventually call a truce to share the workload fairly. Shaun refuses to attend Morgan's party for Eden, as he doesn't want to see Glassman due to him not showing up for Steve's birth, but he changes his mind; Shaun and Glassman come to terms with their conflict and apologize to each other.
119	3	"Critical Support"	James Genn	Thomas L. Moran	March 19, 2024	703	2.15
Phipps is a college student who injured his head during a fraternity party. Shaun becomes irritated by Charlie's impulsive behavior, but she refuses to admit any wrongdoing. Lim and Glassman's differing work methods to appease the hospital board cause them to give conflicting advice to Shaun on how to handle Charlie. As he is about to perform surgery on Phipps, Charlie asks to feel the gall bladder and finds a sharp item in it, leading to the realization that Phipps has metal shards in his body; Shaun uses a magnet to remove the one responsible for his neurological issues from Phipps' tonsils. Despite Charlie's breakthrough, Shaun tells her that she is unfit to be a surgeon. Lim and Glassman try to convince Shaun to give Charlie a chance, but he refuses, reminding them of similar situations he faced when he started working. Park, Dominick, and Jerome work on a man whose hand was caught in a meat grinder. Despite Dominick's fear of blood, he proves to be useful in saving the man's hand. Morgan tells Lea that she is appointing her and Shaun as Eden's guardians should anything happen to her. She is initially reluctant to add Park as a guardian too, but changes her mind after Dominick praises him as a doctor and a person. Asher meets Jerome's family at his niece's confirmation party.
120	4	"Date Night"	Allison Liddi Brown	David Hoselton & Tracy Taylor	March 26, 2024	704	2.51
38-year-old patient Cameron has early-onset Alzheimer's and crashed his car. His wife Gilly is pregnant and fears taking care of both him and the baby will be too much for her. Shaun determines Cameron is instead suffering from a compressed jugular, which can be corrected with surgery. Jordan, Jared, Park, and Charlie try to help Nathan, a friend from Jordan's church choir, whose hearing he fears will be affected by the removal of a benign brain tumor. Charlie's AI research ultimately proves to be useful in removing the tumor without damaging his hearing. Lim's mother Eileen makes a surprise visit, but Lim brushes off her concerns on her well-being and asks Glassman to take her shopping in exchange for covering him for two meetings with the board. Park and Morgan try to be intimate, but their efforts are interrupted by Eden, Lim, and Charlie; it takes a trivial argument for them to finally manage. Shaun and Lea have barely spoken to each other lately due to Shaun taking care of Steve and Lea always being tired. They decide to have a date night at the karaoke bar they used to frequent, only to find that everything in it has changed. They come to realize their lives will never be the same as before, but will also be better.
121	5	"Who at Peace"	Dinh Thai	Peter Blake & Adam Scott Weissman	April 2, 2024	705	2.56
At Lim and Glassman's insistence, Shaun reluctantly agrees to work with Charlie. Along with Jared, they treat Lucy, a morbidly obese 14-year-old girl. Lucy agrees to a gastric sleeve surgery but, when Charlie lists the risks without pointing out their unlikeliness, Lucy and her mother decide against the surgery, angering Shaun. Charlie is able to change their minds by opening up about receiving accommodation for her condition at school. Charlie makes another mistake during the surgery, resulting in Shaun kicking her out of the OR. Shaun informs Glassman that he does not want to work with Charlie anymore; Glassman reveals that Charlie filed a complaint against him. Park and Asher treat Scott, a 75-year-old man whose much younger fiancée Ronit is Jewish. Ronit is diagnosed with inoperable stage 3 ovarian cancer, leaving the couple despondent that Scott, now recovering from hip surgery, won't be able to complete his conversion to Judaism in time for them to marry before Ronit dies. Asher's cynicism about marriage upsets Jerome until Jordan convinces Asher to reconsider. He contacts Benjamin, a rabbi, to facilitate Scott's conversion and the wedding inside the hospital. Benjamin and Asher confront two antisemites vandalizing Benjamin's synagogue. After Asher acknowledges that he is gay and Jewish, the men strike Asher in the head with a metal bar, killing him. Jerome is left waiting at a restaurant where he planned to propose to Asher. An onscreen message says to visit splcenter.org to help stop hate crimes.
122	6	"M.C.E."	Mike Listo	David Renaud & Tristan Thai	April 9, 2024	706	2.62
Still reeling from Asher's murder, the hospital has to deal with a man driving his car through a crowd whilst half the hospital is away at a medical conference. As Lim operates, she places Shaun in charge as he won't let his emotions get in the way, but Lim struggles with losing her patients, including one who resembles Asher. Lim's mother later reveals that her father had secretly suffered from clinical depression, something that she's worried Lim might have as well. Taking her mother's advice, Lim bonds with a patient as she treats his injured arm. Consumed with anger over losing Asher, Jordan finds it difficult to treat the driver, but finds empathy for the young man after talking to his mother. At Shaun's request, Glassman returns to the OR to successfully treat a critical patient and enjoys ending his surgical career on a win. Charlie helps Shaun when he gets overwhelmed and they save a father of two together, changing Shaun's opinion of her and leading Charlie to withdraw the complaint. Lim later commends Shaun for his leadership during the crisis. While treating non-critical patients, Dom is forced to creatively contend with his blood phobia and Morgan reassures Dom that his inventiveness proves that he belongs. At the end of the day, Asher's friends gather to share their fond memories of him.
123	7	"Faith"	Steven DePaul	Teleplay by : Melania Wright & Garrett Lerner; Story by : Melania Wright & Jessica Grasl & Garrett Lerner	April 30, 2024	707	2.58
Naomi is a mother in need of a kidney transplant. A man named Emmanuel volunteers to donate his kidney, but Jordan is reluctant to proceed because he believes he is Jesus. Jordan unleashes her pain and anger over Asher's death on Emmanuel when he brings it up, having lost her faith in God. Shaun deduces that Emmanuel has a pheochromocytoma on his kidney, which explains his mental state. After waking up from his surgery, we learn his real name is Carl and he no longer wants to donate his kidney. After seeing how worried Naomi's family is, Carl reconsiders. Park and Jared treat Paul, who has an inoperable brain tumor and was injured while completing his bucket list. They learn the tumor can be removed, but the surgery would leave Paul quadriplegic, a solution he refuses, not wanting to be a burden for his influencer daughter Eve. Jerome, who is still reeling from Asher's death, talks some sense into Paul. Jared visits Jerome with a list of things Asher wanted to do. Glassman treats Hannah, a drug addict he suspects has chiari zero, as she reminds him of his late daughter Maddie. He gets the results of some imaging he had requested that appear to be bad news. Lea and Morgan get into a fight over Joelle, a nanny Lea wanted for Steve that Morgan hired for Eden first, dragging Shaun and Park in the middle. Shaun suggests employing Joelle at a new daycare center in the hospital. Shaun notices that Steve might be showing early signs of autism.
124	8	"The Overview Effect"	Tracy Taylor	Teleplay by : Yaou Dou & David Hoselton; Story by : Yaou Dou & David Hoselton & Peter Blake	May 7, 2024	708	2.20
Park, Jordan, and Dom treat Mason, a botanist suffering from illnesses related to his time in space and who has a new outlook on life. Although Mason and his wife Ana are at odds about their future together, they find a compromise after Mason nearly dies. Shaun, Charlie, and Jared treat Tayo, a young boy with a third arm from his absorbed twin brother which is threatening his health. Shaun is able to come up with a way to use the nerves from the third arm to give Tayo a fully functional left arm, thanks to some inspiration from Charlie. Glassman attempts to help Hannah after she overdoses on fentanyl in his bathroom, causing Glassman to agree to give her controlled doses of oxycodone. Morgan proposes to Park, who at first rejects her, but changes his mind after seeing Mason and Ana together. Shaun insists upon getting Steve tested for autism, driven by memories of his childhood, but Lea is reluctant due to her own fears. Although Lea eventually agrees to the testing after talking to Glassman, Shaun changes his mind after remembering how supportive his brother was when his parents fought about getting Shaun tested.
125	9	"Unconditional"	Mike Listo	Thomas L. Moran & Adam Scott Weissman	May 14, 2024	709	2.29
After discovering a lump in her breast, Claire returns to San Jose, where she's diagnosed with stage 1 breast cancer, receiving treatment from Shaun, Jared, and Charlie. Lim, Jordan, and Dom treat Clint, a man diagnosed with a brain tumor after being struck by lightning. Clint plays guitar during the successful surgery to remove the tumor to help keep track of his motor skills. Glassman continues to secretly treat Hannah, although it takes an emotional toll on him. After receiving advice from Claire, Shaun reaches out to Hannah, using his own experiences with Glassman to convince Hannah to get help. Claire and Jared's old feelings for each other resurface, culminating in them kissing before Claire suddenly passes out. Claire's return and Clint's surgery cause Lim to remember her more carefree and reckless days. Park and Morgan get married at the bar where they had their first official date. Glassman reveals to Shaun that his cancer has returned and it's terminal this time.
126	10	"Goodbye"	David Shore	Liz Friedman & Jessica Grasl & David Shore	May 21, 2024	710	2.47
Glassman reveals that he has three to six months to live and Shaun desperately tries to find a solution, despite Glassman's refusal to undergo treatment. Claire is diagnosed with an antibiotic-resistant acinetobacter infection, forcing them to put Claire into a coma and amputate her left arm as her condition worsens. Shaun and Charlie devise an experimental bacteriophage treatment, which Glassman gives to Claire so that Shaun won't have to sacrifice his career after the FDA refuses to approve it. Finally accepting Glassman's fate, Shaun spends Glassman's remaining time with him and later opens the Dr. Aaron Glassman Foundation for Neurodiversity in Medicine with Claire. Shaun and Lea go on to have a daughter together, Maddie; Morgan and Park adopt Eden; Jared & Claire and Jordan & Danny Perez get married and have families together. Jerome was able to recover from his grief and is now married. Lim decides to leave the hospital to help with medical treatment in Ukraine, Dom opens his own clinic, and Charlie becomes an attending at St. Bonaventure. Ten years later, Shaun, now the Chief of Surgery, gives a TED talk about his journey to a crowd that includes all of Shaun's friends and family.

== Ratings ==
=== Season 1 ===
Viewership and ratings per episode of List of The Good Doctor episodes
No.	Title	Air date	Rating/share (18–49)	Viewers (millions)	DVR (18–49)	DVR viewers (millions)	Total (18–49)	Total viewers (millions)
1	"Burnt Food"	September 25, 2017	2.2/9	11.22	2.2	7.86	4.4	19.21
2	"Mount Rushmore"	October 2, 2017	2.2/9	10.93	2.1	7.21	4.3	18.12
3	"Oliver"	October 9, 2017	2.0/7	10.69	2.2	7.53	4.2	18.22
4	"Pipes"	October 16, 2017	2.0/8	10.60	2.1	7.34	4.1	17.96
5	"Point Three Percent"	October 23, 2017	1.8/7	10.39	2.0	7.10	3.8	17.50
6	"Not Fake"	October 30, 2017	1.9/7	10.60	2.0	6.93	3.9	17.51
7	"22 Steps"	November 13, 2017	1.9/7	10.14	1.9	6.92	3.8	17.14
8	"Apple"	November 20, 2017	1.8/7	9.97	1.8	6.98	3.6	16.99
9	"Intangibles"	November 27, 2017	1.7/7	9.25	1.8	6.66	3.5	15.91
10	"Sacrifice"	December 4, 2017	1.6/7	9.03	1.8	6.67	3.4	15.74
11	"Islands Part One"	January 8, 2018	1.6/6	8.30	1.8	7.10	3.4	15.40
12	"Islands Part Two"	January 15, 2018	1.7/6	9.33	1.8	6.66	3.5	16.00
13	"Seven Reasons"	January 22, 2018	1.7/7	9.61	1.9	6.91	3.6	16.53
14	"She"	February 5, 2018	1.7/7	9.63	1.8	7.07	3.5	16.71
15	"Heartfelt"	February 26, 2018	1.3/5	7.82	1.8	6.84	3.1	14.66
16	"Pain"	March 12, 2018	1.8/7	9.88	1.5	6.23	3.3	16.12
17	"Smile"	March 19, 2018	1.6/6	9.03	1.5	6.39	3.1	15.42
18	"More"	March 26, 2018	1.7/6	9.52	1.6	6.32	3.3	15.85

=== Season 2 ===
Viewership and ratings per episode of List of The Good Doctor episodes
No.	Title	Air date	Rating/share (18–49)	Viewers (millions)	DVR (18–49)	DVR viewers (millions)	Total (18–49)	Total viewers (millions)
1	"Hello"	September 24, 2018	1.3/6	7.35	1.7	6.78	3.0	14.13
2	"Middle Ground"	October 1, 2018	1.1/5	7.18	1.5	6.14	2.6	13.34
3	"36 Hours"	October 8, 2018	1.1/5	7.18	1.4	6.04	2.5	13.22
4	"Tough Titmouse"	October 15, 2018	1.1/5	6.68	1.3	5.76	2.4	12.44
5	"Carrots"	October 29, 2018	1.0/5	6.79	1.3	5.87	2.3	12.66
6	"Two-Ply (or Not Two-Ply)"	November 5, 2018	1.0/4	6.53	1.5	6.24	2.5	12.81
7	"Hubert"	November 12, 2018	1.0/5	6.53	1.3	5.66	2.3	12.19
8	"Stories"	November 19, 2018	1.1/5	6.84	1.3	5.64	2.4	12.50
9	"Empathy"	November 26, 2018	1.0/5	6.67	1.3	5.55	2.3	12.22
10	"Quarantine"	December 3, 2018	1.1/6	6.12	1.2	5.47	2.3	11.61
11	"Quarantine Part Two"	January 14, 2019	1.2/6	6.26	1.5	6.16	2.7	12.42
12	"Aftermath"	January 21, 2019	1.2/5	6.27	1.2	5.87	2.4	12.15
13	"Xin"	January 28, 2019	1.1/5	6.58	1.4	6.22	2.5	12.80
14	"Faces"	February 4, 2019	1.0/5	5.96	1.4	6.05	2.4	12.01
15	"Risk and Reward"	February 18, 2019	1.1/5	6.23	1.3	5.92	2.4	12.15
16	"Believe"	February 25, 2019	1.1/5	6.36	1.4	6.05	2.5	12.41
17	"Breakdown"	March 4, 2019	1.1/5	6.73	1.3	5.74	2.4	12.47
18	"Trampoline"	March 11, 2019	1.3/6	7.78	1.3	5.62	2.6	13.41

=== Season 3 ===
Viewership and ratings per episode of List of The Good Doctor episodes
No.	Title	Air date	Rating/share (18–49)	Viewers (millions)	DVR (18–49)	DVR viewers (millions)	Total (18–49)	Total viewers (millions)
1	"Disaster"	September 23, 2019	1.0/4	6.26	1.2	5.85	2.2	12.11
2	"Debts"	September 30, 2019	0.9/5	6.07	1.0	5.32	1.9	11.39
3	"Claire"	October 7, 2019	0.9/4	5.59	1.0	5.07	1.9	10.66
4	"Take My Hand"	October 14, 2019	0.8/4	5.76	1.1	5.32	1.9	11.08
5	"First Case, Second Base"	October 21, 2019	0.8/4	5.54	1.0	4.99	1.8	10.53
6	"45-Degree Angle"	November 4, 2019	0.7/3	5.13	1.0	5.05	1.7	10.18
7	"SFAD"	November 11, 2019	0.8/4	5.93	0.9	4.78	1.7	10.71
8	"Moonshot"	November 18, 2019	0.7/4	5.49	0.9	4.87	1.6	10.36
9	"Incomplete"	November 25, 2019	0.9/5	5.86	1.0	5.06	1.9	10.92
10	"Friends and Family"	December 2, 2019	0.9/4	6.11	1.0	4.76	1.9	10.87
11	"Fractured"	January 13, 2020	0.8/4	5.09	1.0	5.25	1.8	10.34
12	"Mutations"	January 20, 2020	0.9/5	5.44	0.9	5.05	1.8	10.49
13	"Sex and Death"	January 27, 2020	0.8/5	5.69	1.0	4.84	1.8	10.53
14	"Influence"	February 10, 2020	0.9/5	5.59	1.0	4.84	1.9	10.43
15	"Unsaid"	February 17, 2020	0.9/5	5.23	0.9	4.70	1.8	9.93
16	"Autopsy"	February 24, 2020	0.8/5	5.63	1.0	4.78	1.8	10.41
17	"Fixation"	March 2, 2020	0.8/4	5.66	1.1	4.97	1.9	10.63
18	"Heartbreak"	March 9, 2020	0.9/5	5.75	0.9	4.74	1.8	10.49
19	"Hurt"	March 23, 2020	1.0/5	6.81	1.0	5.05	2.0	11.86
20	"I Love You"	March 30, 2020	1.1/6	7.71	0.9	4.70	2.0	12.41

=== Season 4 ===
Viewership and ratings per episode of List of The Good Doctor episodes
No.	Title	Air date	Rating (18–49)	Viewers (millions)	DVR (18–49)	DVR viewers (millions)	Total (18–49)	Total viewers (millions)
1	"Frontline Part 1"	November 2, 2020	0.7	4.87	0.8	4.48	1.5	9.35
2	"Frontline Part 2"	November 9, 2020	0.6	4.76	0.8	4.31	1.4	9.07
3	"Newbies"	November 16, 2020	0.6	4.30	0.7	4.30	1.3	8.60
4	"Not the Same"	November 23, 2020	0.6	4.29	0.8	4.17	1.4	8.46
5	"Fault"	November 30, 2020	0.6	4.02	0.6	4.10	1.2	8.12
6	"Lim"	January 11, 2021	0.6	4.06	0.8	4.24	1.4	8.30
7	"The Uncertainty Principle"	January 18, 2021	0.6	3.97	—N/a	—N/a	—N/a	—N/a
8	"Parenting"	January 25, 2021	0.7	4.30	—N/a	—N/a	—N/a	—N/a
9	"Irresponsible Salad Bar Practices"	February 15, 2021	0.6	4.40	0.7	3.94	1.3	8.34
10	"Decrypt"	February 22, 2021	0.6	3.91	0.7	4.27	1.3	8.19
11	"We're All Crazy Sometimes"	March 8, 2021	0.6	4.24	0.6	3.98	1.2	8.22
12	"Teeny Blue Eyes"	March 22, 2021	0.5	4.26	—N/a	—N/a	—N/a	—N/a
13	"Spilled Milk"	March 29, 2021	0.6	4.39	—N/a	—N/a	—N/a	—N/a
14	"Gender Reveal"	April 19, 2021	0.5	4.15	0.6	3.77	1.1	7.92
15	"Waiting"	April 26, 2021	0.5	3.78	0.6	3.67	1.1	7.45
16	"Dr. Ted"	May 10, 2021	0.5	3.91	0.6	3.64	1.1	7.55
17	"Letting Go"	May 17, 2021	0.6	3.80	0.6	3.40	1.1	7.19
18	"Forgive or Forget"	May 24, 2021	0.6	4.03	0.6	3.47	1.2	7.50
19	"Venga"	May 31, 2021	0.5	3.56	0.5	3.50	1.0	7.06
20	"Vamos"	June 7, 2021	0.6	3.99	0.5	3.57	1.1	7.56

=== Season 5 ===
Viewership and ratings per episode of List of The Good Doctor episodes
No.	Title	Air date	Rating (18–49)	Viewers (millions)	DVR (18–49)	DVR viewers (millions)	Total (18–49)	Total viewers (millions)
1	"New Beginnings"	September 27, 2021	0.4	3.99	—N/a	—N/a	—N/a	—N/a
2	"Piece of Cake"	October 4, 2021	0.4	3.73	—N/a	—N/a	—N/a	—N/a
3	"Measure of Intelligence"	October 11, 2021	0.4	3.74	0.4	3.07	0.8	6.81
4	"Rationality"	October 25, 2021	0.4	4.10	—N/a	—N/a	—N/a	—N/a
5	"Crazytown"	November 1, 2021	0.4	3.64	—N/a	—N/a	—N/a	—N/a
6	"One Heart"	November 15, 2021	0.4	3.70	0.4	3.38	0.8	7.08
7	"Expired"	November 22, 2021	0.5	4.22	0.5	3.37	1.0	7.59
8	"Rebellion"	February 28, 2022	0.4	3.44	—N/a	—N/a	—N/a	—N/a
9	"Yippee Ki-Yay"	March 7, 2022	0.4	3.48	—N/a	—N/a	—N/a	—N/a
10	"Cheat Day"	March 14, 2022	0.4	3.66	—N/a	—N/a	—N/a	—N/a
11	"The Family"	March 21, 2022	0.4	3.84	—N/a	—N/a	—N/a	—N/a
12	"Dry Spell"	March 28, 2022	0.4	3.86	—N/a	—N/a	—N/a	—N/a
13	"Growing Pains"	April 4, 2022	0.4	3.66	—N/a	—N/a	—N/a	—N/a
14	"Potluck"	April 11, 2022	0.4	3.99	—N/a	—N/a	—N/a	—N/a
15	"My Way"	April 18, 2022	0.4	3.77	—N/a	—N/a	—N/a	—N/a
16	"The Shaun Show"	May 2, 2022	0.4	3.68	—N/a	—N/a	—N/a	—N/a
17	"The Lea Show"	May 9, 2022	0.4	3.08	—N/a	—N/a	—N/a	—N/a
18	"Sons"	May 16, 2022	0.4	3.45	—N/a	—N/a	—N/a	—N/a

=== Season 6 ===
Viewership and ratings per episode of List of The Good Doctor episodes
No.	Title	Air date	Rating (18–49)	Viewers (millions)	DVR (18–49)	DVR viewers (millions)	Total (18–49)	Total viewers (millions)
1	"Afterparty"	October 3, 2022	0.4	3.54	—N/a	—N/a	—N/a	—N/a
2	"Change of Perspective"	October 10, 2022	0.3	3.18	0.3	2.87	0.6	6.05
3	"A Big Sign"	October 17, 2022	0.3	3.00	0.3	3.06	0.7	6.06
4	"Shrapnel"	October 24, 2022	0.3	3.20	0.3	2.92	0.6	6.12
5	"Growth Opportunities"	October 31, 2022	0.3	3.36	0.3	2.93	0.6	6.29
6	"Hot and Bothered"	November 21, 2022	0.3	3.09	—N/a	—N/a	—N/a	—N/a
7	"Boys Don't Cry"	November 28, 2022	0.3	3.32	—N/a	—N/a	—N/a	—N/a
8	"Sorry, Not Sorry"	December 5, 2022	0.4	3.22	—N/a	—N/a	—N/a	—N/a
9	"Broken or Not"	December 12, 2022	0.3	3.56	—N/a	—N/a	—N/a	—N/a
10	"Quiet and Loud"	January 23, 2023	0.3	3.29	—N/a	—N/a	—N/a	—N/a
11	"The Good Boy"	January 30, 2023	0.3	3.43	—N/a	—N/a	—N/a	—N/a
12	"365 Degrees"	February 6, 2023	0.3	3.14	—N/a	—N/a	—N/a	—N/a
13	"39 Differences"	February 13, 2023	0.3	3.09	—N/a	—N/a	—N/a	—N/a
14	"Hard Heart"	February 27, 2023	0.3	3.12	—N/a	—N/a	—N/a	—N/a
15	"Old Friends"	March 6, 2023	0.3	3.33	—N/a	—N/a	—N/a	—N/a
16	"The Good Lawyer"	March 13, 2023	0.3	3.41	—N/a	—N/a	—N/a	—N/a
17	"Second Chances and Past Regrets"	March 20, 2023	0.3	3.48	—N/a	—N/a	—N/a	—N/a
18	"A Blip"	April 3, 2023	0.3	3.35	—N/a	—N/a	—N/a	—N/a
19	"Half Measures"	April 10, 2023	0.4	3.40	—N/a	—N/a	—N/a	—N/a
20	"Blessed"	April 17, 2023	0.3	3.48	—N/a	—N/a	—N/a	—N/a
21	"A Beautiful Day"	April 24, 2023	0.3	3.69	—N/a	—N/a	—N/a	—N/a
22	"Love's Labor"	May 1, 2023	0.3	3.87	—N/a	—N/a	—N/a	—N/a

=== Season 7 ===
Viewership and ratings per episode of List of The Good Doctor episodes
No.	Title	Air date	Rating (18–49)	Viewers (millions)
1	"Baby, Baby, Baby"	February 20, 2024	0.3	2.86
2	"Skin in the Game"	February 27, 2024	0.2	2.52
3	"Critical Support"	March 19, 2024	0.2	2.15
4	"Date Night"	March 26, 2024	0.2	2.51
5	"Who At Peace"	April 2, 2024	0.2	2.56
6	"M.C.E."	April 9, 2024	0.2	2.62
7	"Faith"	April 30, 2024	0.2	2.58
8	"The Overview Effect"	May 7, 2024	0.1	2.20
9	"Unconditional"	May 14, 2024	0.2	2.29
10	"Goodbye"	May 21, 2024	0.2	2.47
