= Gliding (vehicle) =

Being more fuel efficient by letting go of the gas pedal when moving

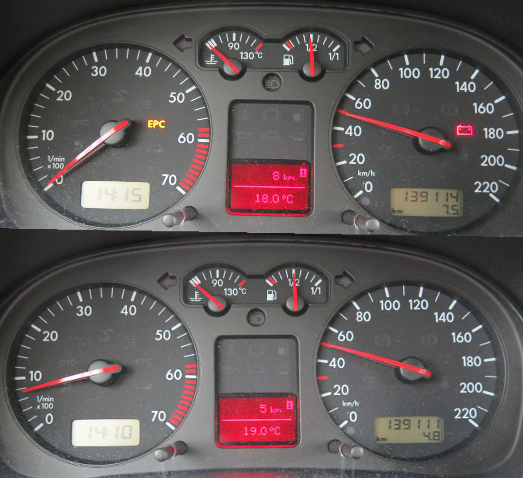
A look on a dashboard at driving speed of 50 km/h. Upper picture shows gliding, where the combustion engine is turned off. Picture below shows coasting where the engine is idling due to a disengaged clutch or the transmission being in neutral.

Gliding is an energy-efficient driving mode achieved by turning off the internal combustion engine while the vehicle is still moving in order to save fuel. This is differentiated from coasting, which means running the vehicle in idle mode by disengaging the engine from the wheels, either by disengaging the clutch or setting the transmission or gearbox to neutral position. Gliding and coasting use the accelerated kinetic energy reserve stored in the vehicles mass, i.e. inertia, to keep the vehicle moving. This energy, however, is being lost due to forces that resist movement, such as air-drag, rolling resistance and gravity.

The functionality, being an integral concept of hybrid electric vehicles, is performed automatically by the engine controller. For vehicles with a conventional internal combustion engine, coasting can be performed manually; gliding requires having a gear box. Manual gliding or coasting is illegal in some states. An extra button to stop the engine was shown in 1979 on International Motor Show Germany, but never became a feature in mass production of any vehicle. In 1980 research was made on the IRVW II. A so-called eClutch (electronic controlled clutch) uses an actuator to disengage the clutch when the driver releases the accelerator.

A start-stop system turns the engine off when the vehicle is stopped. Gliding is turning off the engine while the vehicle is still moving. Safety relevant components like power steering or vacuum servo might be required to be electrically powered, but in most vehicles these components are driven by the combustion engine, only. The fuel saving is depending more on the road terrain and traffic conditions. It is assumed to save up to 7% fuel in the NEDC driving cycle; in real road traffic conditions, the savings is estimated to be up to 10%.

== Coasting ==
Coasting is continuing the vehicle to move by disengaging the clutch or by selecting neutral gear, with the proviso that it is not necessary to do so in order to facilitate easy control of the vehicle. Having the clutch disengaged at low speeds or when the engine would provide little or no engine braking is not classified as coasting, it is merely facilitating easier car control.

It may also be seen as driving the vehicle at a higher speed than the idle speed of the engine and then disengaging the engine from the wheels by setting the transmission or gearbox to neutral position or disengaging the clutch, maintaining the engine in idle mode.

== Gliding a conventional vehicle ==
Pushing the clutch pedal disengages the engine from the powertrain like wheels, drive shafts and gearbox. Releasing the accelerator makes the engine slow down to idle. Turning off the ignition has further effects. Pulling the key causes locking of the steering wheel. Some vehicles switch off headlights or brake lights when the ignition is turned off. After the engine is stopped, applying the brake takes a longer time or giving a few pushes to the brake releases the reserve of the vacuum servo, causing a loss of the brake support. In addition, belt-driven power steering fails immediately. Real hybrid vehicles have electric-driven support of power steering and brake. Bigger engines and engines with a higher compression ratio can cause damage to components of the powertrain at a rough start over clutch from gliding vehicles kinetic power or trailing drag. Using a higher gear decreases the torque force on the powertrain. By turning off the ignition the engine control unit (ECU) needs to detect the engine shafts position. Some ECUs need several rotations of the camshaft to detect ignition and injection timing. Starting the engine in cold start temporarily takes more fuel until operation temperature of the engine is detected by the ECU.

Gliding vehicles equipped with torque converter-based automatic transmissions causes damage due lack of lubrication. Also, restarting the engine by clutch from the vehicle's kinetic energy or drag is not possible. It is required to use the starter. Gliding a vehicle with a turbo engine makes the remaining heat from the exhaust cause damage in the bearing of the turbo. Unsynchronized transmissions require double clutching and can not get the gear in at differing vehicle and engine speeds.

== See also ==
- Consumption map
