= IRVW II =

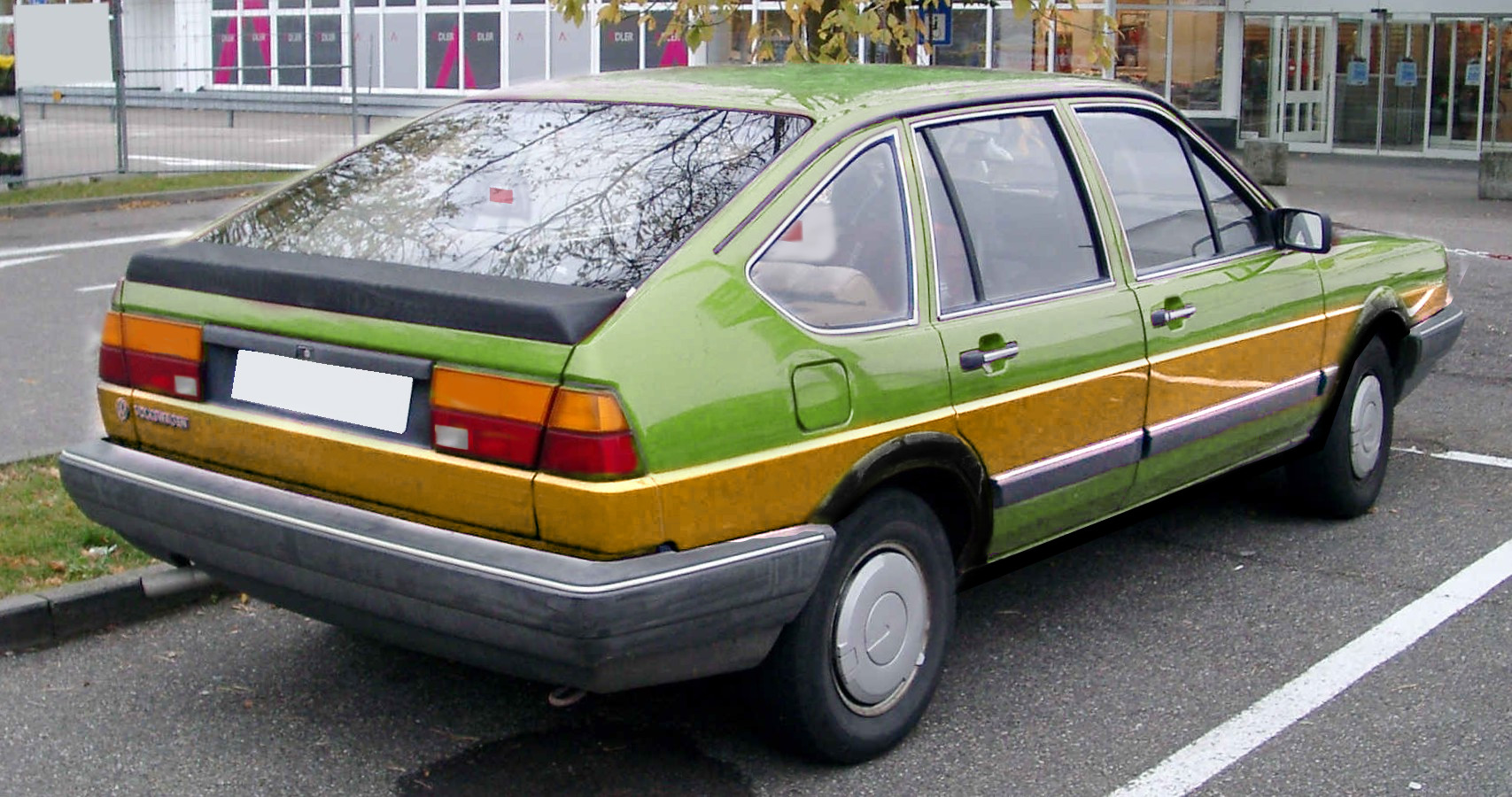
IRVW2 (remastered)

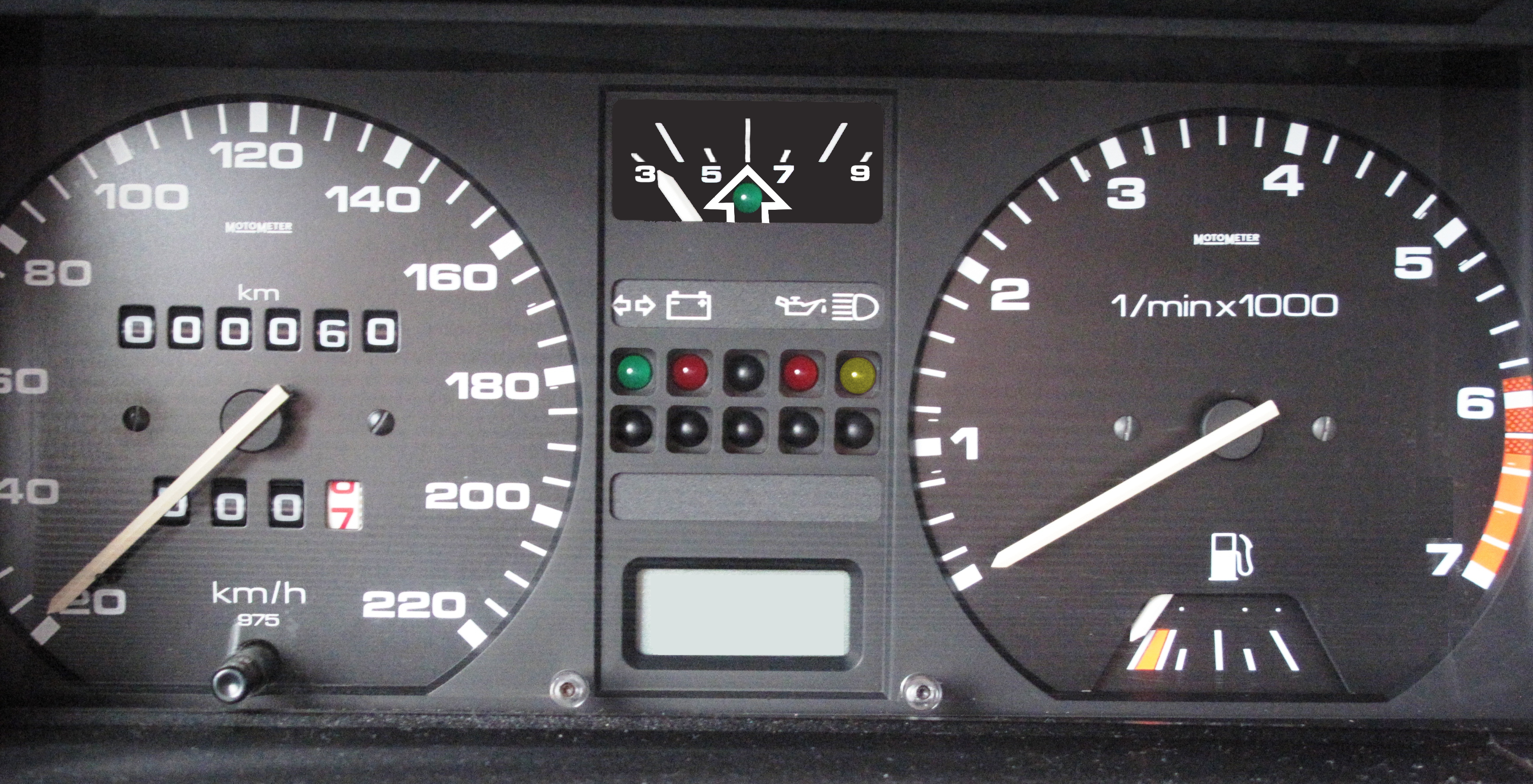
Dashboard of IRVW2 (remastered)

The IRVW II („Integrated Research Volkswagen“) is a modified Volkswagen Passat (B2) from 1980. It was built for research on fuel economy in automobiles.

It had a 1300 cc engine, 997 kg weight and top speed 160 km/h (99 mph). It was developed under Ulrich Seiffert by Ernst Fiala.

Releasing the accelerator shuts down the engine and the vehicle automatically changes the vehicle into gliding. It saved up to 2 l/100 km compared to not using the Formula E. The engine was automatically restarted by using the accelerator. A similar feature was later known as the start-stop system. Depending on the road terrain conditions, it was possible to cover up to half of the way in gliding mode. Since gliding was not taken up into legislation of consumption and taxation, automatic engine shutdown made not its way into production. The additional costs for the new car would have been amortized by saving gasoline in two years average use. After the 1973 oil crisis and the 1979 oil crisis, the concept marketed as Formula E stood for energy saving and expanded the features of the IRVW II. A green indicator light with an upward pointing arrow in the interior recommended the driver to shift up the manual gear box. Ford used this indicator in the 2000s in series. In the e-gear, the then newly installed in cars fifth gear in manual transmissions, a reduction in engine speed was achieved, but not on the vehicle speed, due headwind at this speed. An Ecometer showed in e-gear consumption in l/100 km.

The catalytic converter was already present in 1975 in the US. It was required at this time in 1980, but not on the European market, where leaded fuel which is not compatible with the catalytic converter, disappeared in 1987 from the filling stations in West Germany.

In 1995 Toyota filed the patent on a concept that includes gliding without drivers attention, but also a planetary gearset and electric drive, the predecessor of the Hybrid Synergy Drive, known as a major concept of hybrid vehicles which also keep the internal combustion engine operating inside the economic area of the consumption map.
