= Hypermiling =

Using the least fuel over a distance

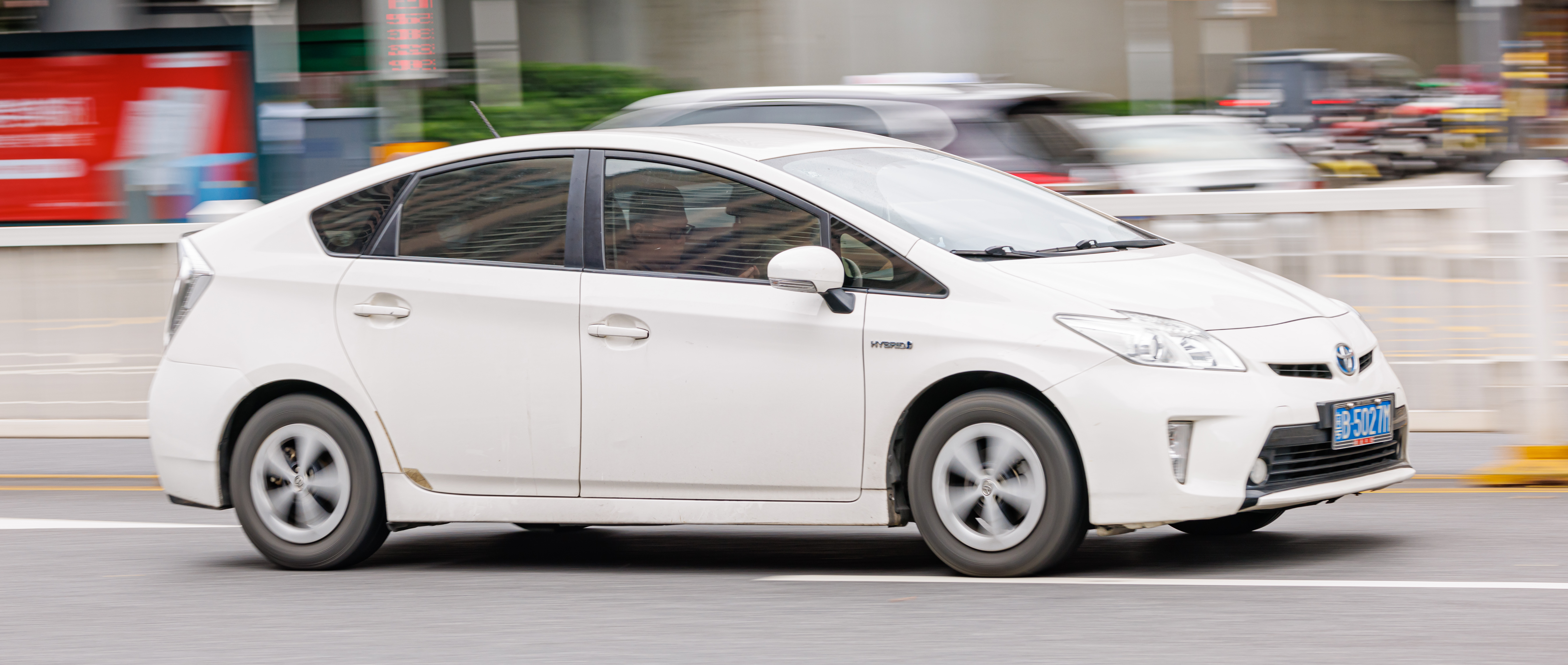
A Toyota Prius is an example hybrid car used for hypermiling

Hypermiling is driving or flying a vehicle with techniques that maximize fuel efficiency. Those who use these techniques are called "hypermilers". In the case of cars, this is an extreme form of energy-efficient driving, where hypermilers can achieve up to 100 mpg_{‑US} (2.4 L/100 km; 120 mpg_{‑imp}) in hybrid cars that have EPA ratings of 30 to 45 mpg (48 to 72 km/gallon, 11 to 16 km/L, 6.2 to 9.3 L/100 km).

Hypermiling can be practiced in any vehicle regardless of fuel consumption. It gained popularity with the rise in gasoline prices in the 2000s. Some hypermiling techniques are illegal in some countries because they are dangerous. In 2008, the New Oxford American Dictionary voted "hypermiling" the best new word of the year.

== Hypermiling techniques with gasoline-powered cars ==
There are various techniques used by gas-powered car driving hypermilers that help increase their gas mileage.

Researchers studying economical driving (or eco-driving) from the University of Belgrade advise on techniques that can be used to minimize fuel consumption while driving, and they include:

- Avoiding unnecessary braking and acceleration
- Maintain a lower, steady speed in the highest gear at a low RPM
- Shift up gears as early as possible
- Idle when you want to coast as long as possible
- Utilizing cruise control
- Use air conditioning and electric equipment sparingly
- Keep windows closed to reduce drag
- Choosing parking locations based on the weather (i.e., parking in the sun in cold weather to keep the car warm, or parking in the shade in warm weather to keep the car cool, so the air conditioner is not needed)
- Parking "face out" to drive forwards immediately after parking
- Parking on a downwards slope to coast forward
- Anticipate driving maneuvers rather than reacting to what happens directly ahead of the car
- Practice the Driving Without Brakes (DWB) mantra, where you try and drive for as long as possible without touching the brakes

Moreover, the same researchers also advise on techniques that can be used to minimize fuel consumption before driving, which include:

- Planning to avoid traffic congestion
- Monitoring energy efficient tires and inflation using a tire-pressure monitoring system
- Adjusting aerodynamic devices
- Avoid overfilling the fuel tank
- Keep up on proper and timely car maintenance
- Choose to drive a fuel-saving hybrid car, like a Toyota Prius
- Choose to walk or cycle instead of driving for shorter distances
- Plan a route needing the least acceleration and braking

Carrying the least weight possible will also aid in less fuel consumed. Moreover, authors from the hypermiling advice website Hypermiler.co.uk suggest wearing thin-soled shoes can aid in reducing fuel consumption; thinner soles can result in increased sensitivity to the gas pedal.

Hypermiling can also be practiced using relatively lower fuel efficiency vehicles like SUVs. An Edmunds experiment reports that hypermiling could add 35.4% more miles per gallon from a Land Rover LR3, which usually gets 12 mpg_{‑US} (20 L/100 km; 14 mpg_{‑imp}) in the city and 17 mpg_{‑US} (14 L/100 km; 20 mpg_{‑imp}) on the highway.

Drafting as a technique for hypermiling has been a subject to controversy. This involves driving close to or slipstreaming behind the car in front, potentially saving 40% of fuel. Drafting can save energy by using the car ahead to push air out of the way. This technique is subject to controversy due to the reduction in visibility and the risk of not being able to brake fast enough if the car in front stops.

== Non-traditional hypermiling ==
=== With electric cars ===
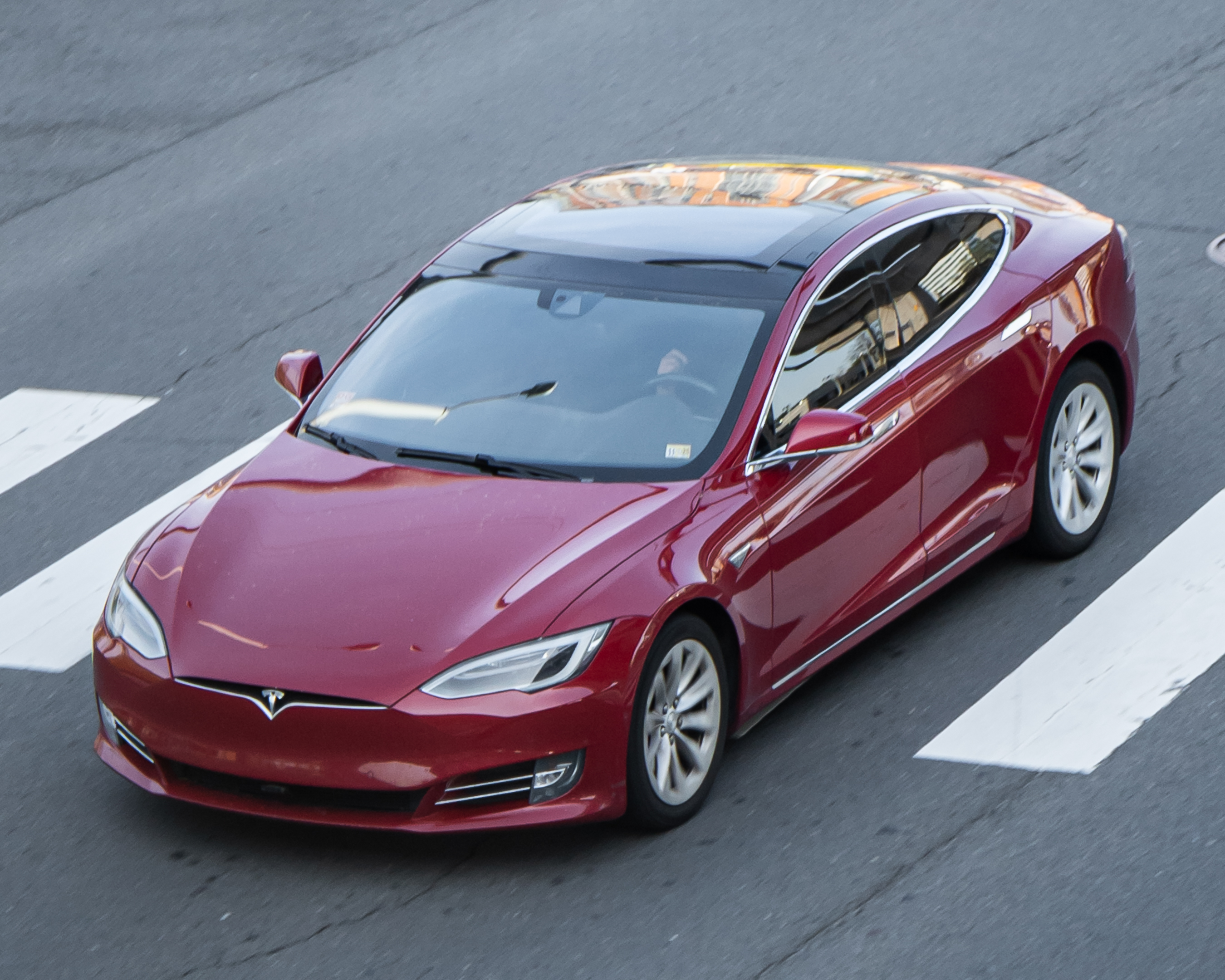
A Tesla Model S as an example of an electric car that can be used for hypermiling

The range of electric cars is limited. To get the most out of the battery, drivers sometimes use hypermiling techniques. Some aim to set a record for most mileage from a single charge. For example, a Tesla Model 3 ran more than 1,000 km (620 mi) with one battery charge. The average speed was 38 km/h (24 mph) and the whole drive took around 30 hours. The tester used the autopilot of Tesla Model 3, running the car unmanned. The test car did not drive on a public road.

=== With aircraft ===
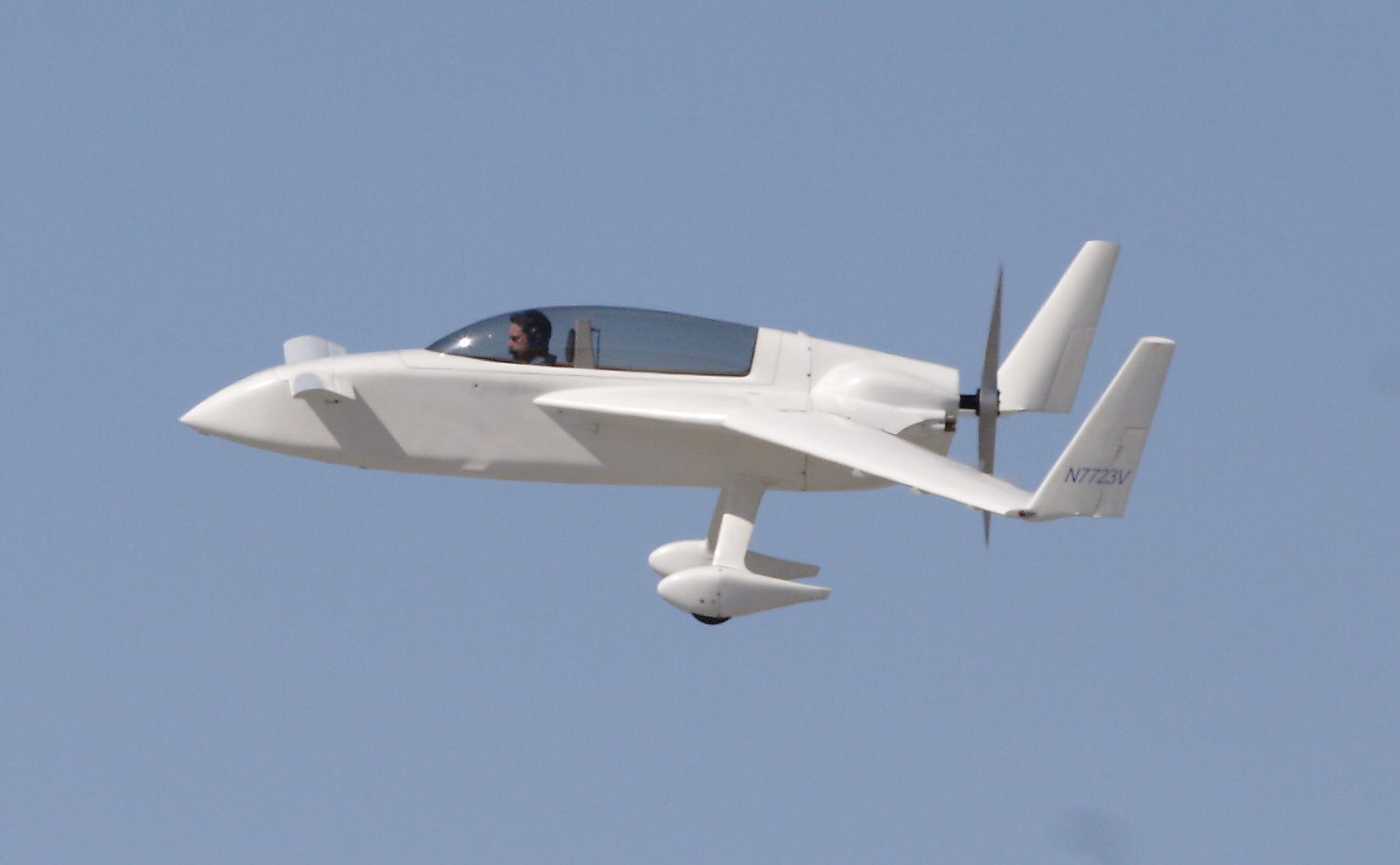
A Rutan VariEze as an example aircraft used to hypermile

There have been several aircraft hypermiling competitions held throughout the years, such the FuelVenture and CAFE challenges. Klaus Savier won the 2009 Fuelventure 400 in a VariEze aircraft which got 45 mpg_{‑US} (5.2 L/100 km; 54 mpg_{‑imp}) at 207 mph (333 km/h) with a modified Continental O-200 engine upgraded with a computerized fuel injection and ignition system by Light Speed Engineering. By slowing to extend range, mileage approaches 100 mpg_{‑US} (2.4 L/100 km; 120 mpg_{‑imp}).

In World War II the famed pilot Charles Lindbergh consulted with pilots of the Army Air Corps and the Marine Corps and introduced engine-leaning techniques which greatly improved fuel consumption at cruise speeds and enabled aircraft to fly longer-range missions.

=== With racing cars ===
In June 2008 at the Michigan International Speedway, Dale Earnhardt Jr. won the Lifelock 400 and shared information about coasting (a hypermiling technique) behind the pace car during the caution flag.

== Records ==
In August 2017, the official Tesla club in Italy, Tesla Owners Club Italia, had five people drive 29 hours in Southern Italy to drive a Tesla Model S 100D a total of 1,078 km (670 mi) on a single charge.

In May 2018, two Colorado residents drove 32 consecutive hours to drive their Tesla Model 3 606.2 miles (975.6 km) on a single charge. It beat a previous record of 560 miles (900 km) from a Tesla Model S P100D, but it fell slightly short of a 670-mile run in a Model S by an Italian team last August.

In 2018, Frenchman Pierre Desjardins set a record covering 351 miles (565 km) of the Périphérique ring road in Paris on a single charge in a 40kWh Renault Zoe, which had an official WLTP range of just 186 miles (299 km), and ended up with a fuel efficiency of 7.9 miles (12.7 km) per kilowatt hour, which equals 7.9 kWh/100km.

In 2022, a team from the armed-forces charity Mission Motorsport drove two stock 52kWh Renault Zoe cars, with an official range of 245 miles (394 km), at Thruxton Circuit in Hampshire to break the previous Renault Zoe EV hypermiling record. They maintained a speed of 19–23 mph (31–37 km/h), and followed racing lines that offered the path of least resistance. The first car finished at 424.7 miles (683.5 km), while the second car finished at 475.4 miles (765.1 km), which was 230.4 miles (370.8 km) more than the Zoe's WLTP range and ended up at 9.14 miles (14.71 km) per kilowatt hour.

== Safety and awareness program ==
Hypermiling has come under fire from several sides because some hypermilers show dangerous or illegal behaviour, such as tailgating larger vehicles on motorways to save fuel, cycling between accelerating and coasting in neutral, and even turning the engine off when its power is not needed. For this reason, the Hypermiling Safety Foundation was established in August 2008 to promote a safety and education program that promotes legal fuel-saving techniques.

== Cultural impact ==
As of 2022, hypermiling may be considered a popular pastime, where there are MPG marathon events and hypermilers share their success in maximizing fuel efficiencies.

== See also ==
- Fuel economy in automobiles
- Rat running
- Energy-efficient driving
