= Energy-efficient driving =

Driving using techniques that reduce fuel consumption

Energy-efficient driving techniques are used by drivers who wish to reduce their fuel consumption, and thus maximize fuel efficiency. Many drivers have the potential to improve their fuel efficiency significantly. Simple things such as keeping tires properly inflated, having a vehicle well-maintained and avoiding idling can dramatically improve fuel efficiency. Careful use of acceleration and deceleration and especially limiting use of high speeds helps efficiency. The use of multiple such techniques is called "hypermiling".

Simple fuel-efficiency techniques can result in reduction in fuel consumption without resorting to radical fuel-saving techniques that can be unlawful and dangerous, such as tailgating larger vehicles.

== Cause of energy losses ==
Example energy flows for a late-model (pre-2009) midsize passenger car: (a) urban driving; (b) highway driving. Source: U.S. Department of Energy

Most of the fuel energy loss in cars occurs in the thermodynamic losses of the engine. Specifically, for driving at an average of 60 kilometres per hour (37 mph), approximately 33% of the energy goes into exhaust and 29% is used to cool the engine; engine friction takes another 11%. The remaining 21% is split between rolling friction of tires (11%), air drag (5%), and braking (5%). Since no miles are gained while idling, or when the engine is in standby, efficiency increases when shutting off the engine when the car is stopped.

== Techniques ==
While up to 95% of the efficiency limits at city speeds are intrinsic to the construction of the vehicle, wide variety of techniques contribute to energy-efficient driving.

=== Maintenance ===
Underinflated tires wear out faster and lose energy to rolling resistance because of tire deformation. The loss for a car is approximately 1.0 percent for every 2 psi (0.1 bar; 10 kPa) drop in pressure of all four tires. Improper wheel alignment and high engine oil kinematic viscosity also reduce fuel efficiency.

=== Mass and improving aerodynamics ===
Drivers can increase fuel efficiency by minimizing transported mass, i.e. the number of people or the amount of cargo, tools, and equipment carried in the vehicle. Removing common unnecessary accessories such as roof racks, brush guards, wind deflectors (or "spoilers", when designed for downforce and not enhanced flow separation), running boards, and push bars, as well as using narrower and lower profile tires will improve fuel efficiency by reducing weight, aerodynamic drag, and rolling resistance. Some cars also use a half size spare tire, for weight/cost/space saving purposes. On a typical vehicle, every extra 55 pounds (25kg) increases fuel consumption by 1 percent. Removing roof racks (and accessories) can increase fuel efficiency by up to 20 percent. Reducing on-board fuel to a lower value (50% to 75%) can also benefit fuel reduction in a town traffic setting ("VW Golf 8 online help".).

=== Maintaining an efficient speed ===
Fuel economy at various driving speeds

Maintaining an efficient speed is an important factor in fuel efficiency. Optimal efficiency can be expected while cruising at a steady speed and with the transmission in the highest gear (see Choice of gear, below). The optimal speed varies with the type of vehicle, although it is usually reported to be between 35 and 50 mph (56 and 80 km/h). For instance, a 2004 Chevrolet Impala had an optimum at 42 mph (68 km/h), and was within 15 percent of that from 29 to 57 mph (47 to 92 km/h).

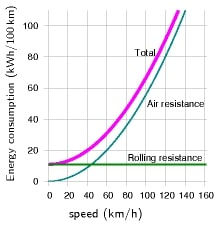
Simple model for energy vs vehicle speed. Air resistance is the main cause expended energy per distance when driving at high steady speeds.

At higher speeds, wind resistance plays an increasing role in reducing fuel economy in automobiles. At 60km/h, the global average speed, energy loss due to air drag in fossil fuel cars is approximately 5% of the total energy loss. Friction (33%), exhaust (29%), and cooling the engine (33%) account for the rest. Above 60km/h, wind resistance grows with approximately the square of speed, becoming the dominant factor at high speed.

Hybrids typically get their best fuel efficiency below this model-dependent threshold speed. The car will automatically switch between either battery powered mode or engine power with battery recharge. Electric cars, such as the Tesla Model S, may go up to 1,080 kilometres (670 mi) at 39 km/h (24 mph).

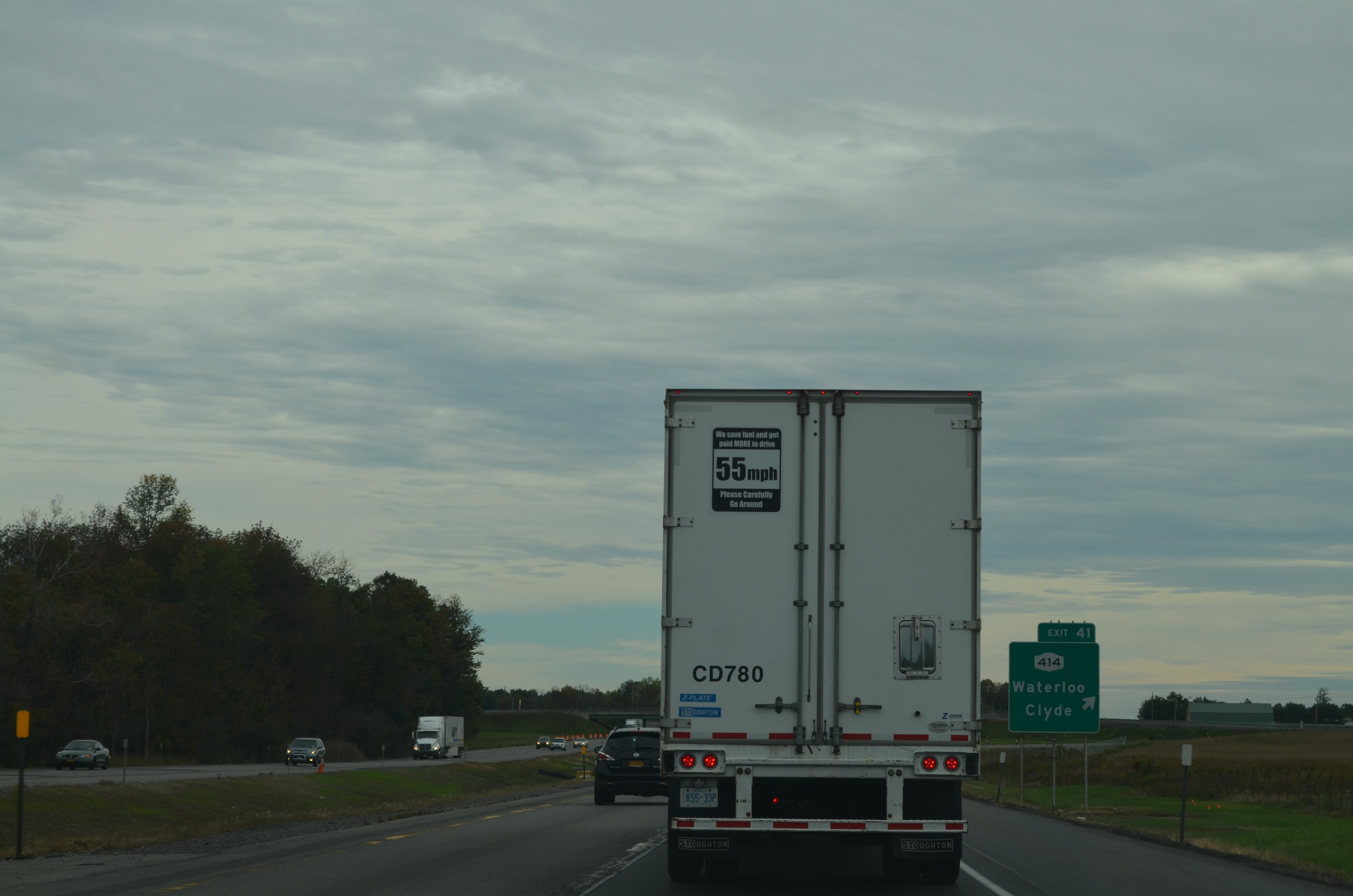
A truck restricted to 55 mph

Road capacity affects speed and therefore fuel efficiency as well. Studies have shown speeds just above 45 mph (72 km/h) allow greatest throughput when roads are congested. Individual drivers can improve their fuel efficiency and that of others by avoiding roads and times where traffic slows to below 45 mph (72 km/h). Communities can improve fuel efficiency by adopting speed limits or policies to prevent or discourage drivers from entering traffic that is approaching the point where speeds are slowed below 45 mph (72 km/h). Congestion pricing is based on this principle; it raises the price of road access at times of higher usage, to prevent cars from entering traffic and lowering speeds below efficient levels.

Research has shown that mandated speed limits can be modified to improve energy efficiency anywhere from 2 to 18 percent, depending on compliance with lower speed limits.

=== Choice of gear (manual transmissions) ===
Engine efficiency varies with speed and torque. For driving at a steady speed one cannot choose any operating point for the engine—rather there is a specific amount of power needed to maintain the chosen speed. A manual transmission lets the driver choose between several points along the powerband. For a turbo diesel too low a gear will move the engine into a high-rpm, low-torque region in which the efficiency drops off rapidly, and thus best efficiency is achieved near the higher gear. In a gasoline engine, efficiency typically drops off more rapidly than in a diesel because of throttling losses. Because cruising at an efficient speed uses much less than the maximum power of the engine, the optimum operating point for cruising at low power is typically at very low engine speed, around (or even slightly below) 1500 rpm for gasoline engines, and 1200 rpm for diesel engines. This explains the usefulness of very high "overdrive" gears for highway cruising. For instance, a small car might need only 10–15 horsepower (7.5–11.2 kW) to cruise at 60 mph (97 km/h). It is likely to be geared for 2500 rpm or so at that speed, yet for maximum efficiency the engine should be running at about 1500 rpm (gasoline) or 1200 rpm (diesel) to generate that power as efficiently as possible for that engine (although the actual figures will vary by engine and vehicle).

=== Acceleration and deceleration (braking) ===
Fuel efficiency varies with the vehicle. Fuel efficiency during acceleration generally improves as RPM increases until a point somewhere near peak torque (brake specific fuel consumption). However, accelerating to a greater than necessary speed without paying attention to what is ahead may require braking and then after that, additional acceleration. One study from 2001 recommended accelerating briskly, but smoothly before shifting in manual cars.

Generally, fuel efficiency is maximized when acceleration and braking are minimized. So a fuel-efficient strategy is to anticipate what is happening ahead, and drive in such a way so as to minimize acceleration and braking, and maximize coasting time.

The need to brake is sometimes caused by unpredictable events. At higher speeds, there is less time to allow vehicles to slow down by coasting. Kinetic energy is higher, so more energy is lost in braking. At medium speeds, the driver has more time to choose whether to accelerate, coast or decelerate in order to maximize overall fuel efficiency.

While approaching a red signal, drivers may choose to "time a traffic light" by easing off the throttle before the signal. By allowing their vehicle to slow down early and coast, they will give time for the light to turn green before they arrive, preventing energy loss from having to stop.

Due to stop and go traffic, driving during rush hours is fuel inefficient and produces more toxic fumes.

Conventional brakes dissipate kinetic energy as heat, which is irrecoverable. Regenerative braking, used by hybrid/electric vehicles, recovers about 50% of the car's energy in each braking event, leading to perhaps 20% reduction in energy costs of city driving.

=== Coasting or gliding ===
An alternative to acceleration or braking is coasting, i.e. gliding along without propulsion. Coasting dissipates stored energy (kinetic energy and gravitational potential energy) against aerodynamic drag and rolling resistance which must always be overcome by the vehicle during travel. If coasting uphill, stored energy is also expended by grade resistance, but this energy is not dissipated since it becomes stored as gravitational potential energy which might be used later on. Using stored energy (via coasting) for these purposes is more efficient than dissipating it in friction braking.

When coasting with the engine running and manual transmission in neutral, or clutch depressed, there will still be some fuel consumption due to the engine needing to maintain idle engine speed.

Coasting with a vehicle not in gear is prohibited by law in most U.S. states, mostly if on downhill. An example is Maine Revised Statutes Title 29-A, Chapter 19, §2064 "An operator, when traveling on a downgrade, may not coast with the gears of the vehicle in neutral". Some regulations differ between commercial vehicles not to disengage the clutch for a downgrade, and passenger vehicles to set the transmission to neutral. These regulations point on how drivers operate a vehicle. Not using the engine on longer, precipitous downgrade roads, or excessively using the brake might cause a failure due to overheating brakes.

Turning the engine off instead of idling does save fuel. Traffic lights are predictable, and it is often possible to anticipate when a light will turn green. Some cars accomplish this with a start-stop system, turning the engine off and on automatically during a stop. Some traffic lights have timers on them, which assist the driver in using this tactic.

Some hybrids must keep the engine running whenever the vehicle is in motion and the transmission engaged, although they still have an auto-stop feature which engages when the vehicle stops, avoiding waste. Maximizing use of auto-stop on these vehicles is critical because idling causes a severe drop in instantaneous fuel-mileage efficiency to zero miles per gallon, and this lowers the average (or accumulated) fuel-mileage efficiency.

=== Anticipating traffic ===
A driver may improve their fuel efficiency by anticipating the movement of other vehicles or sudden changes to the situation the driver is currently in. For example, a driver who stops quickly, or turns without signaling, reduces the options another driver has for maximizing their performance. By always giving road users as much information about their intentions as possible, a driver can help other road users reduce their fuel usage (as well as increase their safety). Similarly, anticipation of road features such as traffic lights can reduce the need for excessive braking and acceleration. Drivers should also anticipate the behaviour of pedestrians or animals in the vicinity, so they can react to a developing situation involving them appropriately.

=== Minimizing ancillary losses ===
Using air conditioning requires the generation of up to 5 hp (3.7 kW) of extra power to maintain a given speed. A/C systems cycle on and off, or vary their output, as required by the occupants so they rarely run at full power continuously. Switching off the A/C and rolling down the windows may prevent this loss of energy, though it will increase drag, so that cost savings may be less than is generally anticipated. Using the passenger heating system slows the rise to operating temperature for the engine. Either the choke in a carburetor-equipped car (1970's or earlier) or the fuel injection computer in modern vehicles will add more fuel to the fuel-air mixture until normal operating temperature is reached, decreasing fuel efficiency.

=== Fuel type ===
Using high octane gasoline fuel in a vehicle that does not need it is generally considered an unnecessary expense, although Toyota has measured slight differences in efficiency due to octane number even when knock is not an issue. All vehicles in the United States built since 1996 are equipped with OBD-II on-board diagnostics and most models will have knock sensors that will automatically adjust the timing if and when pinging is detected, so low octane fuel can be used in an engine designed for high octane, with some reduction in efficiency and performance. If the engine is designed for high octane then higher octane fuel will result in higher efficiency and performance under certain load and mixture conditions.

Battery-electric vehicles use around 20kWh of energy for 100km of travel (equivalent to 3 miles/kWh), about 4 times less than a fossil fuel car.

=== Pulse and glide ===
Pulse and glide (PnG) driving strategy consists of acceleration to a given speed ("pulse" or "burn"), followed by a period of coasting or gliding down to a lower speed, at which point the burn-coast sequence is repeated. This driving strategy has been found and experienced by drivers to save fuel for a long time, and some experiments also validated its fuel-saving ability. In the PnG operation, coasting is most efficient when the engine is not running, although some gains can be realized with the engine on (to maintain power to brakes, steering and ancillaries) and the vehicle in neutral. Most modern petrol vehicles cut off the fuel supply completely when coasting (over-running) in gear, although the moving engine adds considerable frictional drag and speed is lost more quickly than with the engine declutched from the drivetrain.

The pulse-and-glide strategy is proven to be an efficient control design in both car-following and free-driving scenarios, with up to 20% fuel saving. In the PnG strategy, the control of the engine and the transmission determines the fuel-saving performance, and it is obtained by solving an optimal control problem (OCP). Due to a discrete gear ratio, strong nonlinear engine fuel characteristics, and different dynamics in the pulse/glide mode, the OCP is a switching nonlinear mixed-integer problem.

Some hybrid vehicles are well-suited to performing pulse and glide. In a series-parallel hybrid (see hybrid vehicle drivetrain), the internal combustion engine and charging system can be shut off for the glide by simply manipulating the accelerator. However, based on simulation, more gains in economy are obtained in non-hybrid vehicles.

This control strategy can also be used in vehicle platoon (The platooning of automated vehicles has the potential of significantly enhancing the fuel efficiency of road transportation), and this control method performs much better than conventional linear quadratic controllers.

The efficiency of a combustion engine in a hybrid vehicle can be determined using its consumption map, battery capacity, battery level, load, and gear ratio, and it also depends on acceleration, wind drag, and speed.

=== Causes of pulse-and-glide energy saving ===
Much of the time, automobile engines operate at only a fraction of their maximal efficiency, resulting in lower fuel efficiency (or higher specific fuel consumption (SFC), which is the same thing). Charts that show the SFC for every feasible combination of torque (or Brake Mean Effective Pressure) and RPM are called Brake specific fuel consumption maps. Using such a map, one can find the efficiency of the engine at various combinations of rpm, torque, etc.

During the pulse (acceleration) phase of pulse and glide, the efficiency is near maximal due to the high torque and much of this energy is stored as kinetic energy of the moving vehicle. This efficiently obtained kinetic energy is then used in the glide phase to overcome rolling resistance and aerodynamic drag. In other words, going between periods of efficient acceleration and gliding gives an overall efficiency that is usually higher than when cruising at a constant speed. Computer calculations have predicted that in rare cases, such as at low speeds where the torque required for cruising at steady speed is low, it's possible to double, or even triple, fuel economy. More realistic simulations that account for other traffic suggest improvements of 20 percent are more likely. This means that in the real world one is unlikely to see fuel efficiency double or triple. This is likely due to traffic signals, stop signs, and considerations for other traffic; all of these factors interfere with the pulse and glide technique. However, improvements in fuel economy of approximately 20 percent are still feasible.

=== Drafting or slipstreaming ===
Drafting or slipstreaming is a technique whereby a smaller vehicle drives or coasts close behind a vehicle ahead of it so that it is shielded from wind. Aside from being illegal in many jurisdictions, it is often dangerous. Real-world tests of a car driving ten feet behind a semi-truck showed a 90 percent reduction of aerodynamic drag (wind force) and as a result, a 39 percent increase in efficiency.

=== Safety ===
There is sometimes a tradeoff between saving fuel and preventing crashes.

In the US, the speed at which fuel efficiency is maximized often lies below the speed limit, typically 35 to 50 mph (56 to 80 km/h); however, traffic flow is often faster than this. The speed differential between cars raises the risk of collision.

Drafting increases risk of collision when there is a separation of fewer than three seconds from the preceding vehicle.

Coasting is another technique for increasing fuel efficiency. Shifting gears and/or restarting the engine increase the time required for an avoidance maneuver that involves acceleration. Therefore, some believe the reduction of control associated with coasting is an unacceptable risk. It is illegal in some jurisdictions.

However it is also likely that an operator skilled in maximising efficiency through anticipation of other road users and traffic signals will be more aware of their surroundings and consequently safer. Efficient drivers minimise their use of brakes and tend to leave larger gaps in front of them. Should an unforeseen event occur such drivers will usually have more braking force available than a driver that brakes heavily through habit thus causing brake fade.

=== Applications of artificial intelligence ===
Artificial intelligence (AI) and machine learning (ML) models have been applied to the relationship between fuel consumption and driving behavior. The main factors representing and influencing driving behavior include velocity, acceleration, gear, road parameters, weather, etc.

== Hypermiling ==
Enthusiasts known as hypermilers develop and practice driving techniques to increase fuel efficiency and reduce consumption. Hypermilers have broken records of fuel efficiency, for example, achieving 109 miles per gallon in a Prius. In non-hybrid vehicles these techniques are also beneficial, with fuel efficiencies of up to 59 mpg_{‑US} (4.0 L/100 km) in a Honda Accord or 30 mpg_{‑US} (7.8 L/100 km) in an Acura MDX.

== See also ==
- Alternative fuel vehicle
- Carpool
- Car speed and energy consumption
- Fuel economy in automobiles
- Fuel efficiency
- Fuel saving device
- Plug-in hybrid
