= Volkswagen Passat (B2) =

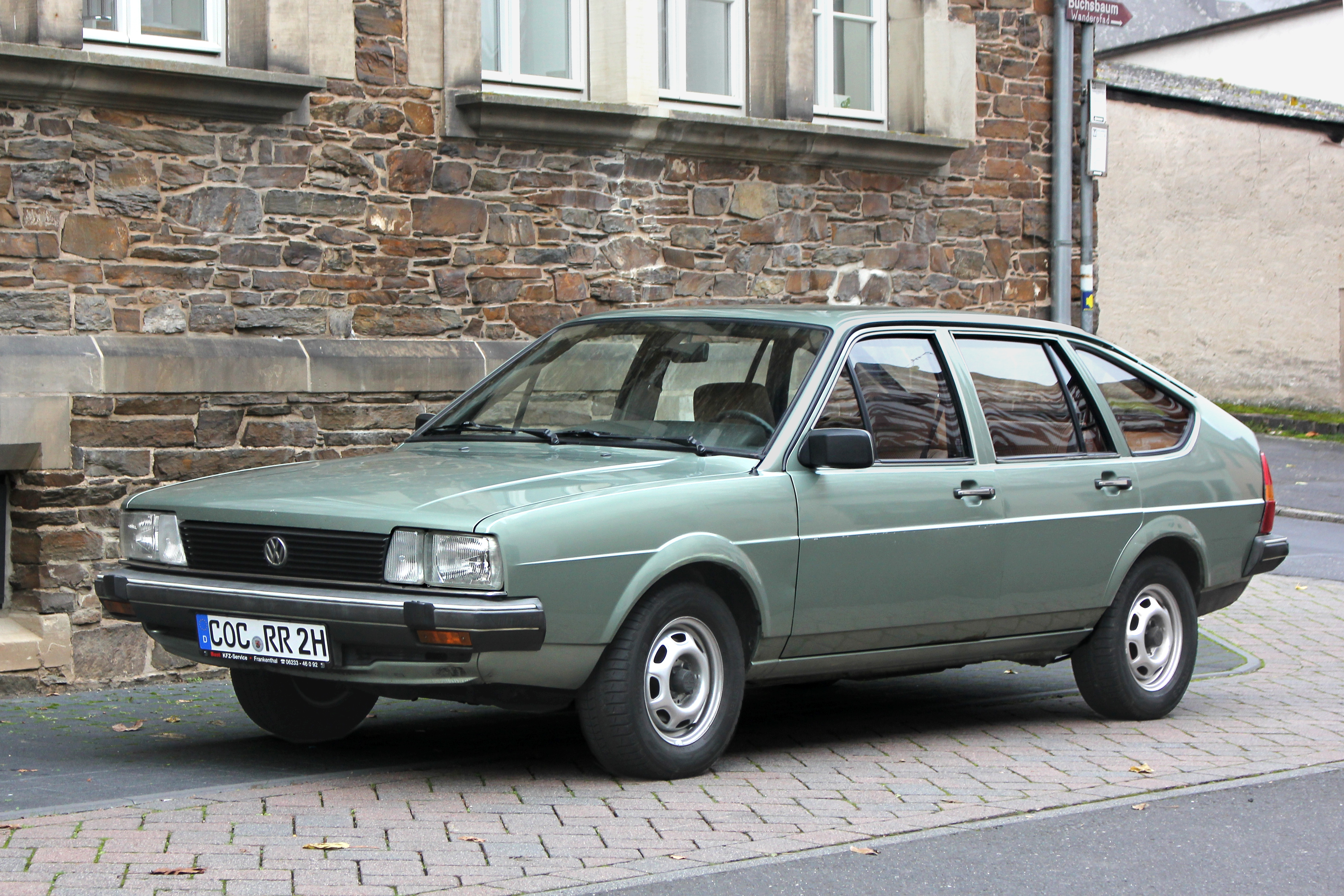
- Volkswagen Passat B2 Hatchback (1980–1985)

Overview
- Also called: Volkswagen Carat (Argentina); Volkswagen Corsar (Mexico); Volkswagen Quantum (US, Brazil); Volkswagen Santana (China, Brazil, Japan)
- Production: 1981–1988; 1983–1985 (China; CKD); 1985–2013 (China; full production)
- Assembly: Germany: Emden; Belgium: Brussels; Spain: Barcelona, Zona Franca; Brazil: São Bernardo do Campo; Mexico: Puebla; China: Shanghai (SAIC-VW); Japan: Zama (Nissan); South Africa: Uitenhage
- Designer: Luca Rezzonico

Body and chassis
- Class: Mid-size car / Large family car (D)
- Body style: 2-door saloon/sedan (Latin America); 3/5-door fastback/hatchback 4-door saloon/sedan (Santana); 5-door estate/wagon
- Layout: Longitudinal front engine, front-wheel drive or four-wheel drive
- Platform: Volkswagen Group B2
- Related: Audi 80 (B2); Ford Versailles; Ford Royale; Volkswagen Quantum; Volkswagen Santana

Powertrain
- Engine: Petrol engines: 1.3 L I4; 1.5 L I4; 1.6 L I4; 1.7 L I4 (1982–83 Quantum); 1.8 L I4; 1.9 L I5; 2.0 L I4 (Latin America); 2.1 L I5; 2.2 L I5; Diesel engines: 1.6 L I4; 1.6 L TD I4
- Transmission: 4/5-speed manual; 3-speed automatic

Dimensions
- Wheelbase: 2,550 mm (100.4 in)
- Length: 3/5d: 4,435 mm (174.6 in); Variant: 4,540 mm (178.7 in); Santana: 4,545 mm (178.9 in)
- Width: 1,685 mm (66.3 in); Santana: 1,695 mm (66.7 in) facelifted Santana: 1,710 mm (67.3 in)
- Height: 1,385 mm (54.5 in); Santana: 1,400 mm (55.1 in); 54.8 in (1,392 mm) (GL); 58 in (1,473 mm) (GL Syncro) facelifted Santana: 1,427 mm (56.2 in)

Chronology
- Predecessor: Volkswagen Passat (B1)
- Successor: Volkswagen Passat (B3)

The Volkswagen Passat (B2) is an automobile produced by German manufacturer Volkswagen from 1981 to 1988. It was the second generation of the Volkswagen Passat, the platform of which was slightly longer than that of the preceding Passat (B1). As with the previous generation, it was based on the platform of the Audi 80; the corresponding B2 version of which had already been launched in 1978. The Santana was also manufactured in China, Brazil, Mexico (as the Corsar, from 1984 and 1988) and Argentina (as the Carat between 1987 and 1991). In Brazil, the Santana station wagon was sold as the Quantum. In the United States, both the Santana sedan and station wagon were sold as the Quantum. The Passat saloon and estate were produced in South Africa for their local market until 1987. The production of Passat B2 in China ended in January 2013.

== History ==
The body configurations for the Passat B2 included hatchback, Variant (estate/wagon), and a three-box saloon which, until the 1985 facelift, was marketed as the Volkswagen Santana in Europe. In most markets, the equipment levels were renamed from L/LS/GLS to CL/GL/CD. The four-wheel drive Syncro Variant was introduced in April 1984, initially only with the 2-litre five-cylinder engine. In August, the more powerful 2.2-litre option was added.

Like the previous generation, the B2 Passat was mainly sold with four-cylinder petrol and diesel engines. Unlike its predecessor, however, top-of the line versions received five-cylinder Audi or VW engines of 1.9–2.2 litres. In addition to four- and five-speed manuals and three-speed automatic gearboxes, the Passat/Santana was also available with Volkswagen's interesting 4+E transmission. This, also called the "Formel E", had an overdrive fourth and an even taller fifth gear, which combined with a freewheeling mechanism to provide better gas mileage but less impressive performance. Originally, this was the only five-speed transmission offered with the Passat B2. An automatic stop/start was also available in some markets.

The four-wheel drive system used in the Passat Variant Syncro shared the mechanics of the Audi 80 quattro rather than the Volkswagen Golf Syncro. When first shown, at the 1983 Frankfurt Motor Show, the car was meant to be called the "Passat Tetra". The Syncro's bottom plate was almost entirely different, requiring a transmission tunnel, a relocated gas tank, and no spare tire well (to make room for the complex rear axle assembly). Unlike the related Audi 80 quattro which used a reversed front wheel setup, the rear-axle was an adapted Volkswagen Transporter unit which enabled retaining a flat loading floor. Only the more popular estate was deemed worthy of reengineering, so as to not offer direct competition with the sedan-only Audi 80 quattro. Syncro was also available in the American market, only with the five-cylinder engine.

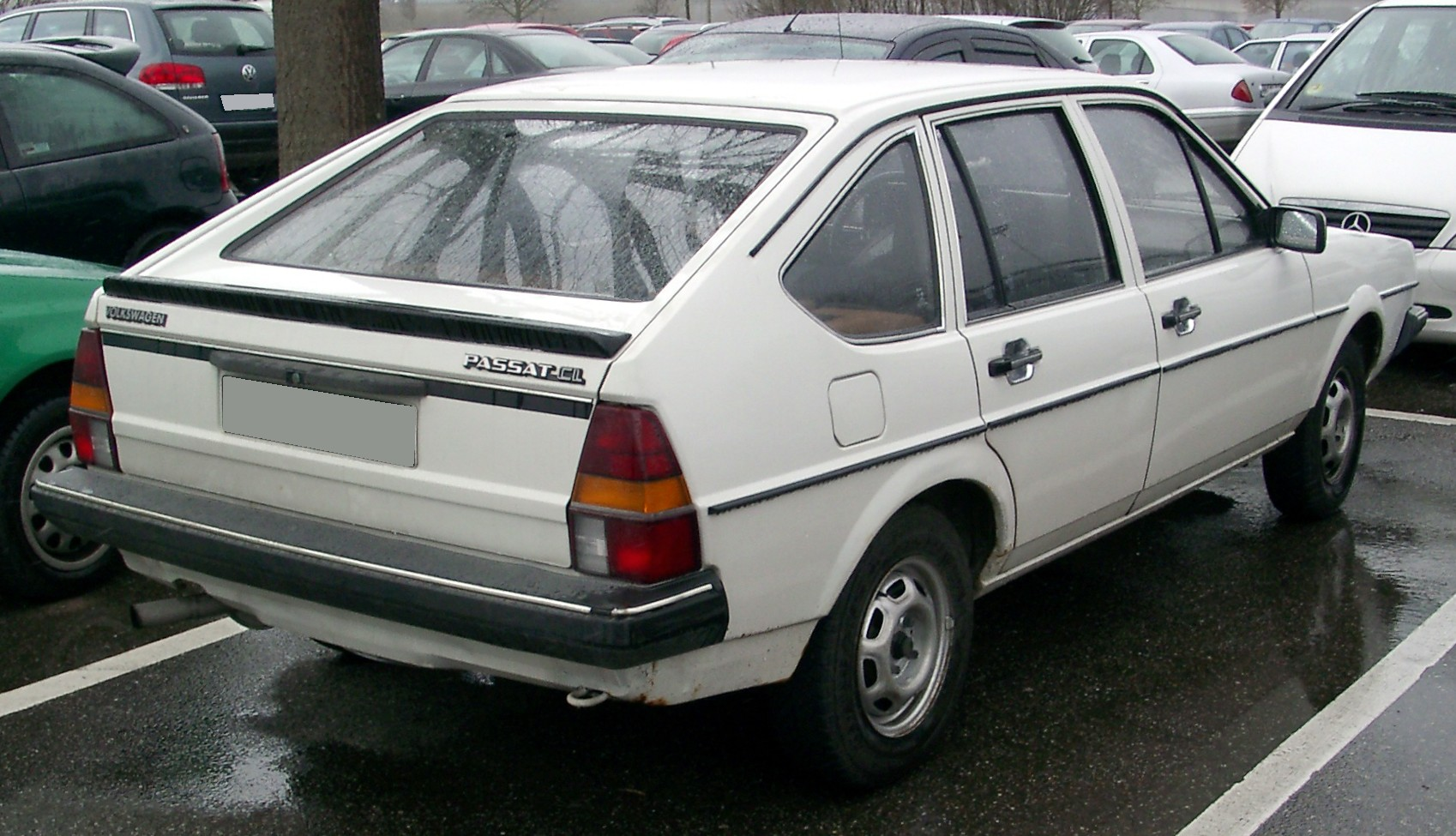
Pre-facelift Passat B2 5-door hatchback

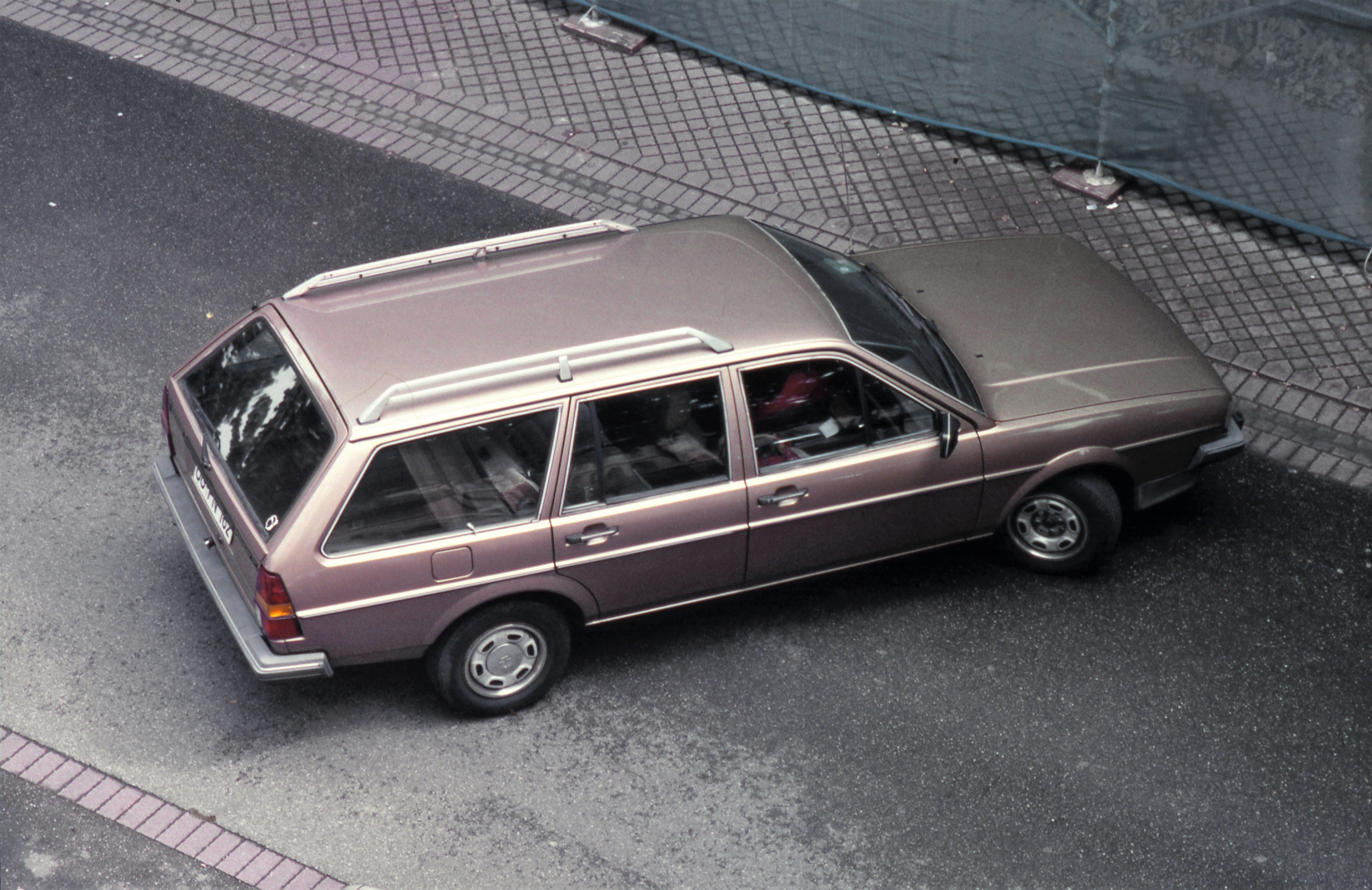
1982 Passat B2 Variant

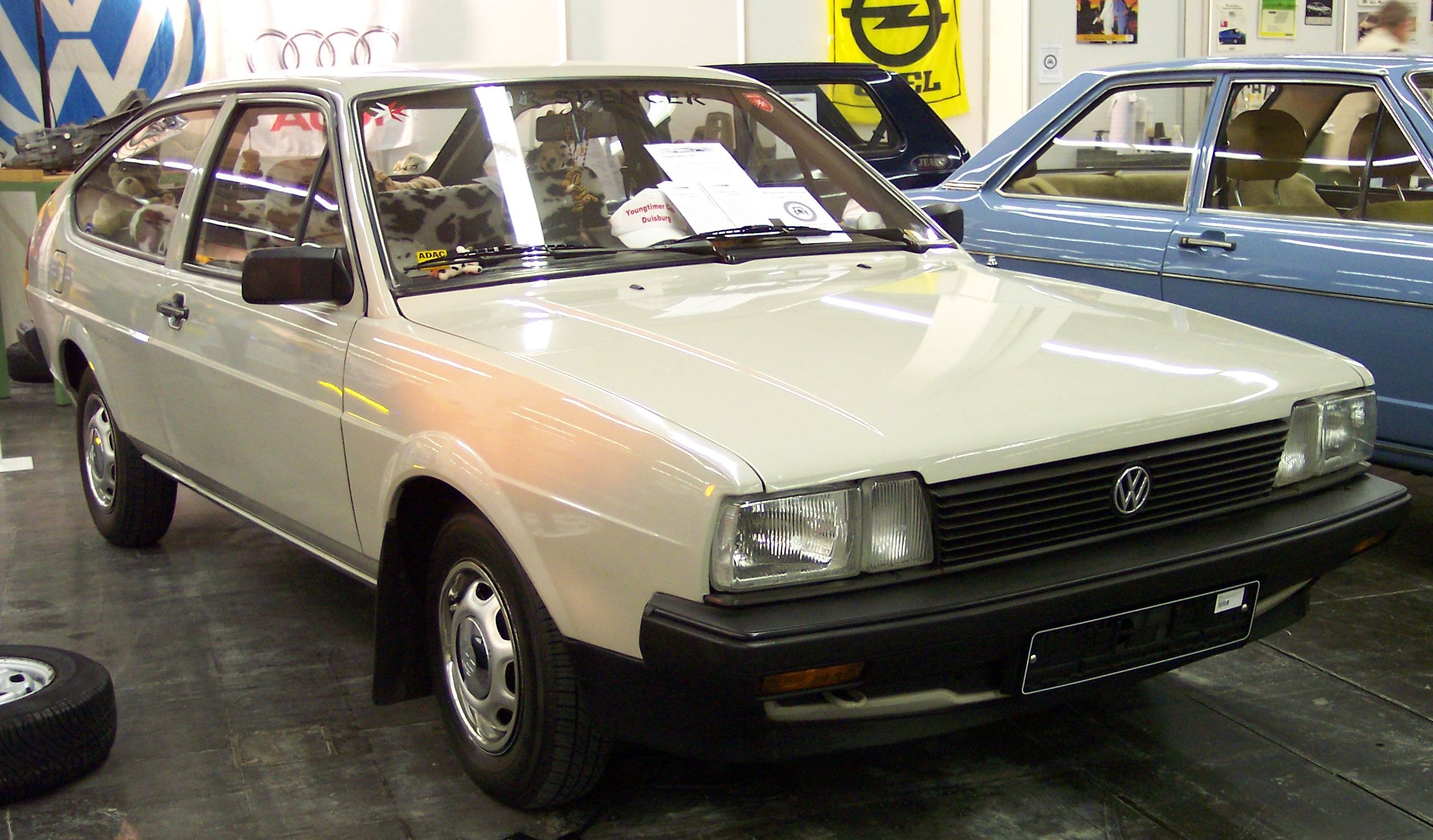
Volkswagen Passat B2 three-door hatchback (Europe)

=== IRVW II ===
The IRVW II is a modified Passat B2 from 1980. It was built for research on fuel economy in automobiles.

=== 1985 Facelift ===
In January 1985, the range received a facelift with revised bumpers, interior, and front grille. The hatchback versions also received a new rear design, with broad and slim taillights replacing the earlier tall and skinny units. It also has a small integrated spoiler at the rear, and a flush-mounted rear windshield for lower wind resistance and a less cluttered appearance. The three-door hatchback was discontinued while the separate Santana nameplate was dropped in Europe. The saloon's name as well as the front end were now the same as the hatchback and estate, and the small price increase for the sedan was eliminated. The Passat GT was a new model, available as a liftback or station wagon. The Variant was now also available with the smallest 1.3-liter engine.

The Passat Variant Syncro, after a few months in production in the pre-facelift design, was also updated along with the rest of the line. Its equipment and appearance was now aligned with the GT trim, including the alloy wheels. All five-cylinder Passats received power steering as standard equipment, to minimize the effects of this engine's greater weight. Equipment levels were increased somewhat but were still spartan, even by the standard of the time. The mid-level Passat CL only now received indicator lights for the parking brake and brake fluid level, but these were still not installed in the Passat C. In August 1985 a catalyzed version of the 2.2-liter five-cylinder Syncro was introduced, producing 120 PS (88 kW). In January 1986 the Syncro programme was further expanded with a C model, fitted with the catalyzed 90 PS (66 kW) 1.8-liter inline-four engine.

On 31 March 1988 production ended (although Syncro models continued in production until June) with 3,345,248 built in Germany. World production totaled approximately 4.5 million units.

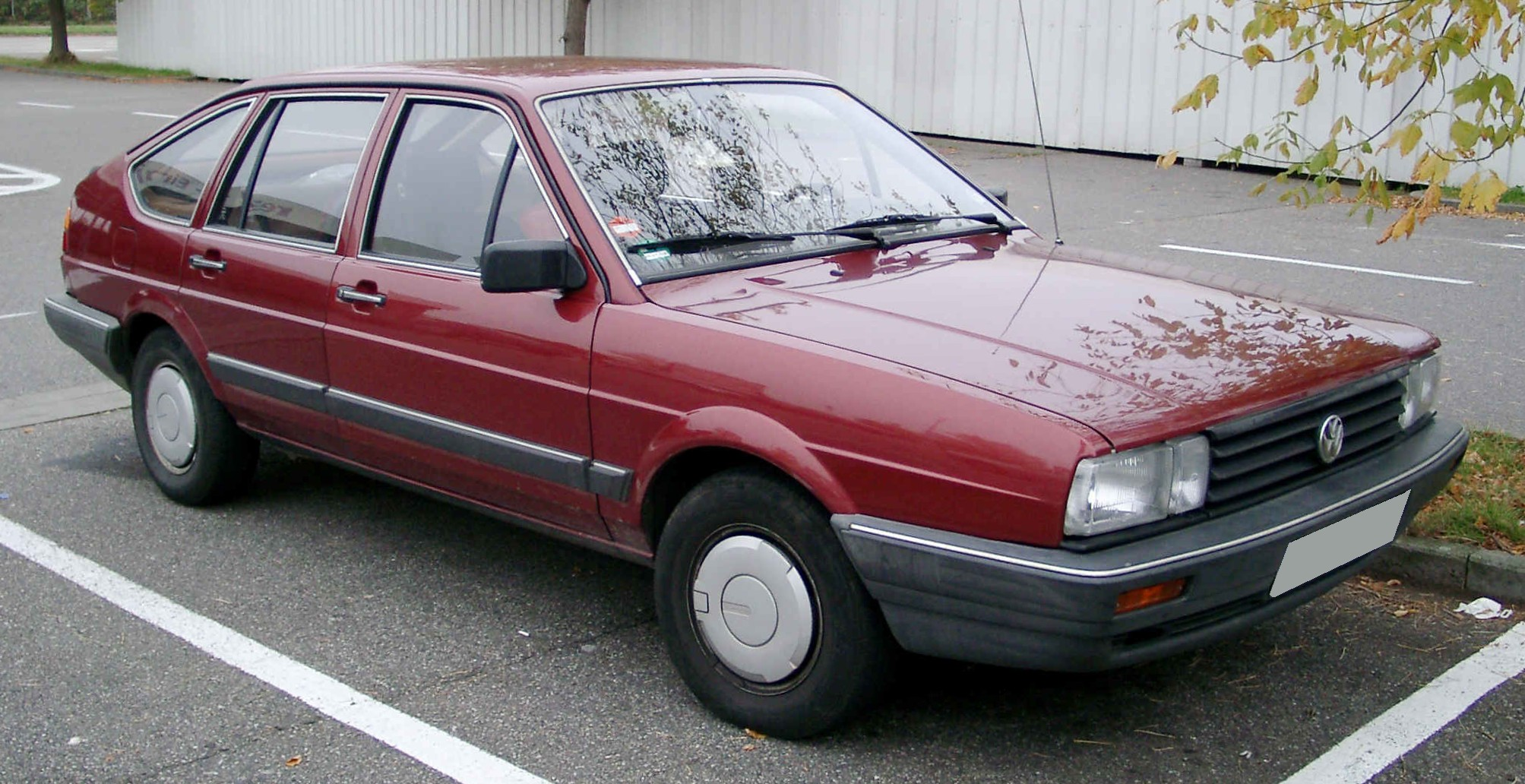
Facelifted Passat hatchback

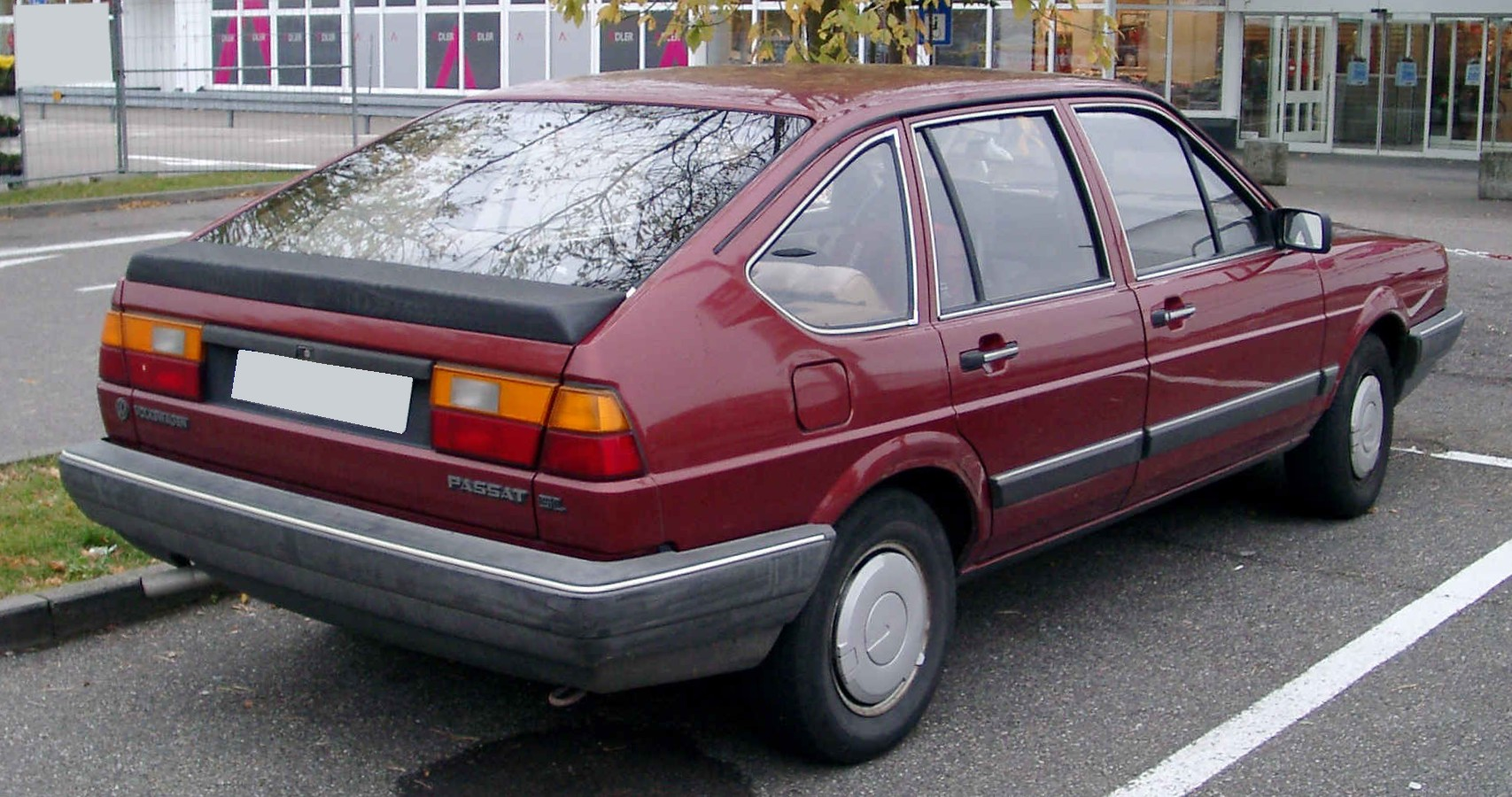
rear view

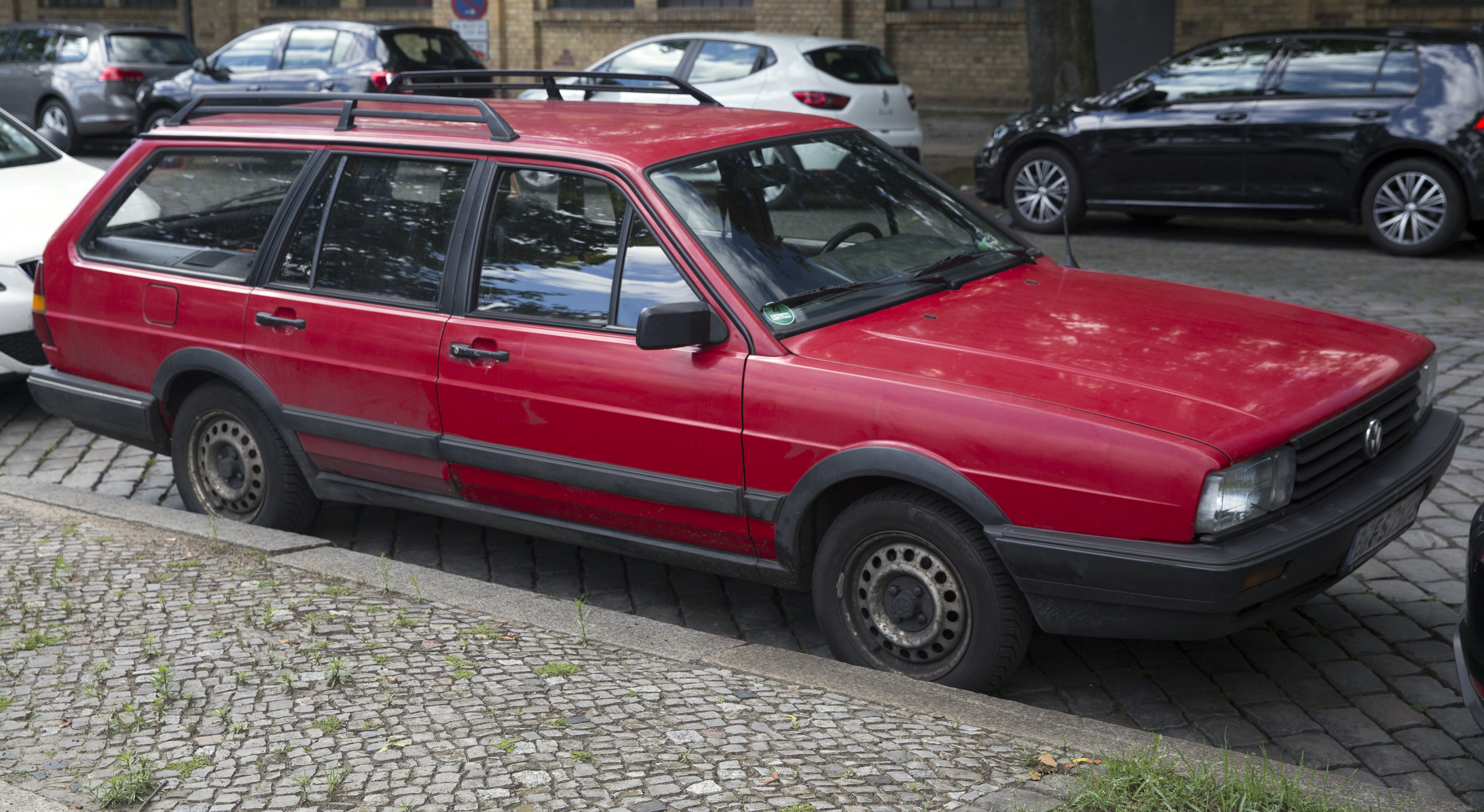
Facelifted Passat Variant GT (Germany)

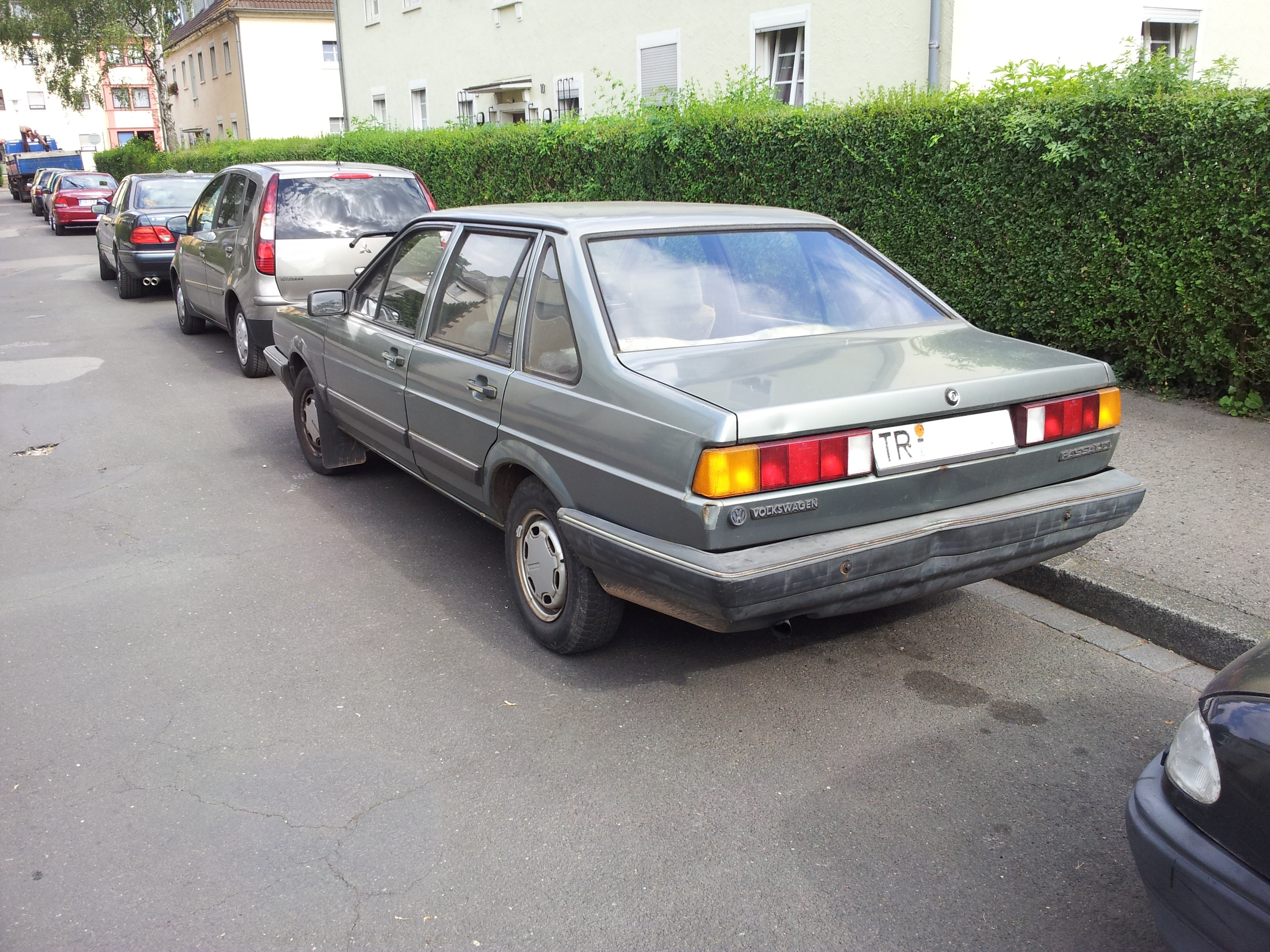
Passat CL sedan - after the facelift, the "Santana" badge was no longer used on the sedans

== Quantum (United States) ==
In the United States (this generation was not sold in Canada), the Passat/Santana was marketed as the Volkswagen Quantum beginning with the 1982 model year. The federalized model was, as is typical, fitted with much larger bumpers and sealed beam headlights as well as side marker lights. Various emission controls also added to the cars' overall weight. The add-ons increased the Quantum's wind resistance to drag coefficient of Cd=0.41. The Quantum was available in three-door hatchback (marketed as a "Coupe" and accordingly fitted with a rear spoiler), four-door Sedan, and Wagon forms. The five-door hatchback was never marketed in the US and the three-door hatchback was dropped after less than two years. There was a standard model and an available GL option, which added power windows, locks, and mirrors, as well as rear headrests, cruise control, and other extras. The 2.1-liter five-cylinder engine was introduced for 1983 as the Quantum GL-5. The Syncro station wagon was only offered with this engine.

The original engine used in the Quantum was the 1.7-liter inline-four also used in many other Volkswagen and Audi vehicles (as well as the Dodge Omni/Plymouth Horizon); there was no diesel option at first. The fuel injected 1.7 produces 74 hp (55 kW) at 5,000 rpm and was coupled to the high-geared 4+E transmission or to a three-speed automatic. While extremely fuel-efficient at steady highway speeds, the tall gearing meant the somewhat underpowered engine had to work hard in most American conditions and real world fuel economy was not impressive in period tests. This changed with the 1983 model year, when the 2.1-liter, five-cylinder GL-5 version was added to the lineup (displacing 2144 cc, this was usually referred to as a "2.2" in Volkswagen's promotional material). The turbo diesel engine was mentioned as soon to be introduced in the 1983 catalog, but it would not go on sale for about two more years. The 1.7 was discontinued at the end of this year, in favor of Volkswagen's 1.8-liter version of the same engine with 88 hp (66 kW) at 5,500 rpm (only available on the Quantum Wagon). In 1985, the long promised 1.6-liter turbo diesel with 68 hp (51 kW) at 5,500 rpm was added to the GL sedan and the five-cylinder gasoline engine was enlarged to 2.2 liters and 110 hp (82 kW) at 5,500 rpm. In 1986, only the five-cylinder Quantum GL sedan remained available. In 1987, the Quantum received European-style composite headlamps and the wagon made a comeback, now equipped as the GL Sedan but also available with the Syncro all-wheel drive system. The lineup remained unchanged for 1988, the Quantum's final year on sale.

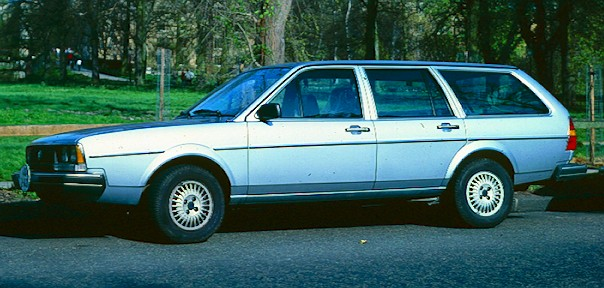
1982–1985 Volkswagen Quantum GL Wagon

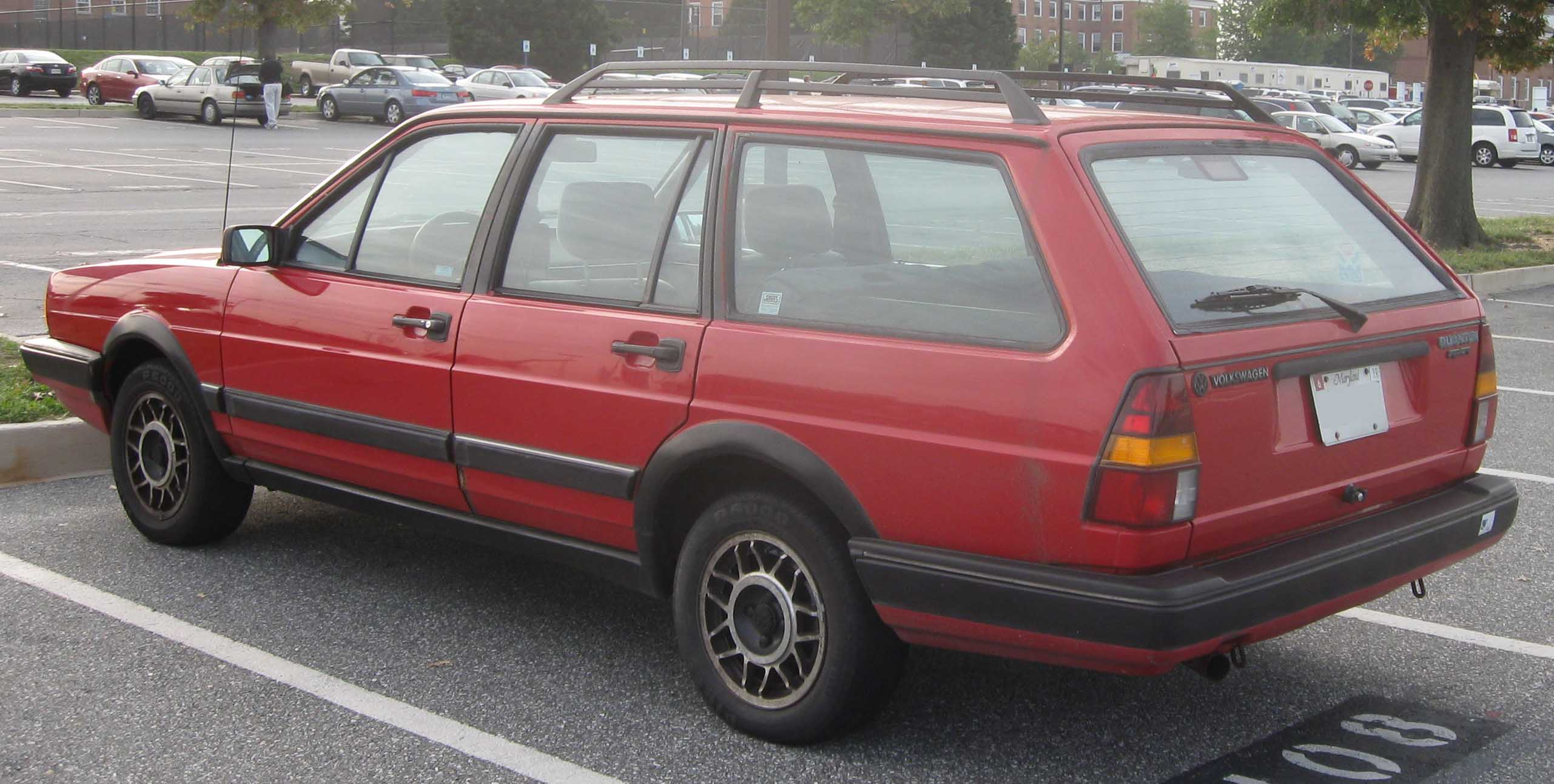
Volkswagen Quantum Wagon, facelift model

== Engines ==
=== Petrol ===
Model	Mixture formation	Cylinder	Displacement (cm³)	Max. power kW (PS) at RPM	Max. torque Nm at RPM	Engine code	Catalytic converter	Production period	notes
1.3	carburetor	4	1272	40 (55) / 5800	90 / 3400	FY	–	10/1980–07/1983	
1.3	carburetor	4	1272	44 (60) / 5800	95 / 3800	FZ	–	10/1980–07/1983	Export models
1.3	carburetor	4	1296	44 (60) / 5600	100 / 3500	EP	–	08/1983–07/1986	
1.6	carburetor	4	1588	48 (65) / 5000	115 / 3000	WP	–	10/1980–12/1981	For countries with lower octane fuel
1.6	carburetor	4	1588	51 (70) / 5600	121 / 3000	YY	–	10/1980–07/1981	For Austria
1.6	carburetor	4	1588	51 (70) / 5200	123 / 3200	WVA	–	08/1981–07/1983	For Austria
1.6	carburetor	4	1588	55 (75) / 5600	119 / 3000	WY	–	11/1980–07/1983	For Switzerland and Sweden
1.6	carburetor	4	1588	55 (75) / 5600	121 / 3200	YN	–	10/1980–07/1981	
1.6	carburetor	4	1588	55 (75) / 5600	121 / 3200	WV	–	08/1981–07/1983	
1.6	carburetor	4	1588	63 (85) / 5600	127 / 3200	YP	–	02/1981–12/1982	
1.6	carburetor	4	1595	51 (70) / 5200	118 / 2700	PP	G-Kat	03/1987–03/1988	
1.6	carburetor	4	1595	53 (72) / 5200	120 / 2700	RL	U-Kat	04/1986–03/1988	
1.6	carburetor	4	1595	55 (75) / 5500	125 / 2500	JU	–	08/1983–07/1987	
1.6	carburetor	4	1595	55 (75) / 5000	125 / 2500	DT	–	08/1983–03/1988	
1.7	carburetor	4	1715	55 (74 hp) / 5000	122 / 3000	WT	G-Kat	08/1981–07/1983	Only for the USA
1.8	carburetor	4	1781	64 (87) / 5000	143 / 3200	RM	U-Kat	10/1986–03/1988	
1.8	carburetor	4	1781	66 (90) / 5200	145 / 3300	DS	–	01/1983–03/1988	
1.8	carburetor	4	1781	66 (90) / 5200	145 / 3300	JV	–	08/1983–12/1987	
1.8	KE-Jetronic	4	1781	66 (90) / 5500	137 / 3250	JN	G-Kat	01/1984–03/1988	
1.8	KE-Jetronic	4	1781	66 (88 hp) / 5500	130 / 3250		G-Kat	08/1983–07/1985	USA (Quantum)
1.8	K-Jetronic	4	1781	82 (112) / 5800	160 / 3500	DZ	–	03/1984–12/1984	
1.9	carburetor	5	1921	85 (115) / 5900	154 / 3700	WN	–	10/1980–07/1983	
2.0	K-Jetronic	5	1994	83 (113) / 5400	160 / 3200	SK	U-Kat	04/1986–11/1986	
2.0	K-Jetronic	5	1994	85 (115) / 5400	160 / 3200	JS	–	08/1983–03/1988	
2.0	K-Jetronic	5	1994	85 (115) / 5400	160 / 3200	HP	–	08/1983–03/1988	with EGR; for Switzerland and Sweden
2.0	MPI	5	1994	103 (140) / 6400	175 / 4800	JD	G-Kat	01/1987–10/1989	20 valves; only for Japan
2.1	K-Jetronic	5	2144	85 (115) / 5300	168 / 4000	WE	-	04/1981–07/1983	with EGR; for Switzerland and Sweden
2.1	K-Jetronic	5	2144	75 (100 hp) / 5500	152 / 3000		G-Kat	08/1982–07/1984	USA (Quantum)
2.2	KE-Jetronic	5	2226	85 (115) / 5500	165 / 2500	KX	G-Kat	08/1985–03/1988	
2.2	KE-Jetronic	5	2226	82 (110 hp) / 5500	165 / 2500		G-Kat	08/1984–1988	USA (Quantum)
2.2	K-Jetronic	5	2226	100 (136) / 5700	184 / 3550	KV	–	01/1985–03/1988	
2.2	K-Jetronic	5	2226	100 (136) / 5700	184 / 3550	HY	–	08/1984–03/1988	with EGR; for Switzerland and Sweden
2.2	KE-Jetronic	5	2226	88 (120) / 5500	170 / 3000	JT	G-Kat	08/1985–07/1988	Only for Syncro
2.2	KE-Jetronic	5	2226	86 (115 hp) / 5500	171 / 3000		G-Kat	08/1986–1988	USA (Quantum GL Syncro)

=== Diesel ===
Model	Intake Charging	Cylinder	Displacement cm³	Max. powerkW (PS) at RPM	Max. torqueNm at RPM	Engine code	Production period	notes
1.6 D	Naturally Aspirated	4	1588	40 (54) / 4800	102 / 2000	CR	10/1980–07/1982	
1.6 D	Naturally Aspirated	4	1588	40 (54) / 4800	100 / 2300	JK	08/1982–03/1988	
1.6 TD	Exhaust gas Turbocharger	4	1588	51 (70) / 4500	133 / 2500	CY	08/1981–03/1988	
1.6 TD	Exhaust gas Turbocharger	4	1588	51 (70) / 4500	133 / 2800	MD	08/1984–07/1985	Only for the USA
1.6 TD (LLK)	Exhaust gas Turbocharger with intercooler	4	1588	59 (80) / 4500	155 / 2600	RA	05/1986–03/1988	only installed in test vehicles, later in the Golf II
