= Volkswagen Passat (B1) =

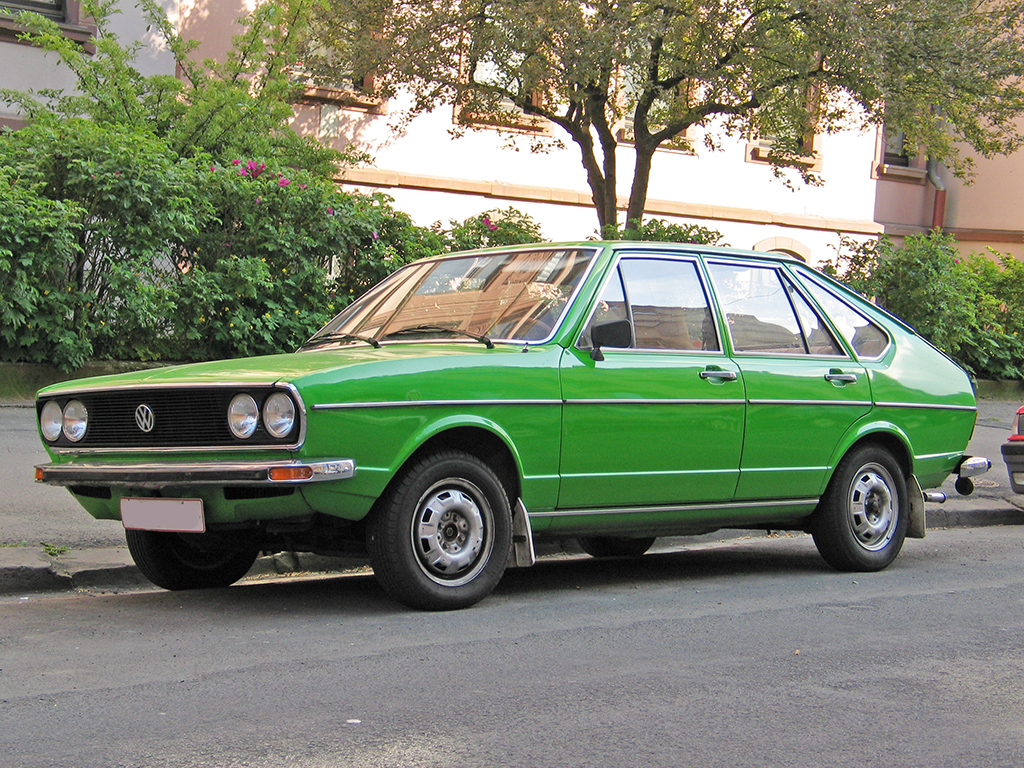
- Volkswagen Passat (B1)

Overview
- Also called: Volkswagen Dasher (North America)
- Production: 1973–1981; 1974–1988 (Brazil)
- Assembly: Germany: Wolfsburg; Germany: Emden; Germany: Salzgitter; Australia: Clayton, Victoria (1974–1977); Belgium: Brussels; Brazil: São Bernardo do Campo; Brazil: Taubaté; Nigeria: Lagos (Volkswagen of Nigeria Ltd); South Africa: Uitenhage
- Designer: Giorgetto Giugiaro at Italdesign

Body and chassis
- Class: Mid-size car / Large family car (D)
- Body style: 2/4-door fastback saloon/sedan; 3/5-door hatchback; 5-door estate/station wagon
- Layout: Front engine, front-wheel drive
- Platform: Volkswagen Group B1
- Related: Audi 80/Fox

Powertrain
- Engine: 1.3 L I4; 1.5 L I4; 1.6 L I4; 1.5 L I4 diesel engine
- Transmission: 4/5-speed manual

Dimensions
- Wheelbase: 2,470 mm (97.2 in)
- Length: 4,190 mm (165.0 in)
- Width: 1,600 mm (63.0 in)
- Height: 1,360 mm (53.5 in)

Chronology
- Successor: Volkswagen Passat (B2)

The Volkswagen Passat (B1) is a large family car produced by Volkswagen in West Germany from 1973 to 1981.

== B1 in Europe ==
The original Volkswagen Passat was launched in 1973. The body types offered originally were two- and four-door fastback sedans (that were discontinued in 1981). These were joined in January 1975 by identically profiled three- and five-door hatchback versions. Externally all four shared a modern design, styled by the Italian designer Giorgetto Giugiaro. In essence, the first Passat was a fastback version of the mechanically identical Audi 80 sedan, introduced a year earlier. While the Audi 80 was nominated Car of the Year by the European motor press in 1973, they considered the Passat a facelifted version of the Audi and thus ineligible for the 1974 competition. The Passat became Wheels magazine's Car of the Year for 1974, however. A five-door station wagon/estate was introduced in 1974; the same car was available with Audi badging in many markets.

The Passat was one of the most modern European family cars at the time and was intended as a replacement for the aging Volkswagen Type 3 and Type 4. The platform serving it and the Audi 80 was named B1. In Europe, the Passat was equipped with either two rectangular, two round 7-inch (180 mm) units, or quadruple round 5.5-inch (140 mm) headlights depending on specification.

The Passat originally used the four-cylinder OHC 1.3 L (55 PS or 40 kW or 54 hp) and 1.5 L (with either 75 or 85 PS, 55 or 63 kW or 74 or 84 hp) petrol engines developed by Audi and also used in the Audi 80—longitudinally mounted with front-wheel drive, in Audi tradition, with either a four-speed manual transmission or three-speed automatic. It had a MacPherson strut front suspension with a solid axle/coil spring setup at the rear.

The SOHC 1.5 was enlarged to 1.6 L in August 1975 with unchanged power ratings and slightly higher torque ratings. In July 1978 the Passat Diesel became available, equipped with the VW Golf's 50 PS (37 kW; 49 hp) 1.5 L Diesel, followed in February 1979 (at the AutoRAI) by the Passat GLI with a fuel-injected version of the 1.6 L engine.

The whole range received a facelift in summer 1977 (model year 1978—launched during 1978 outside of Europe), featuring an interior upgrade including a new dashboard and subtly revised styling including repositioned indicators and depending on model, either four round or two rectangular headlights. The objective, according to the manufacturer, was to differentiate the VW version from the mechanically similar Audi 80. Inside was a restyled dashboard in the style of the Golf, with the radio and heating controls now mounted centrally, one above the other, in a single unit alongside the principal dials. Engine mountings, the gearbox, and the exhaust system were modified in order to reduce interior noise, and comfort was also improved by changes to the springing and shock absorbers. The car's wheels were increased in size, and at the back, there was a stronger anti-roll bar. Right-hand-drive versions retained the original dashboard.

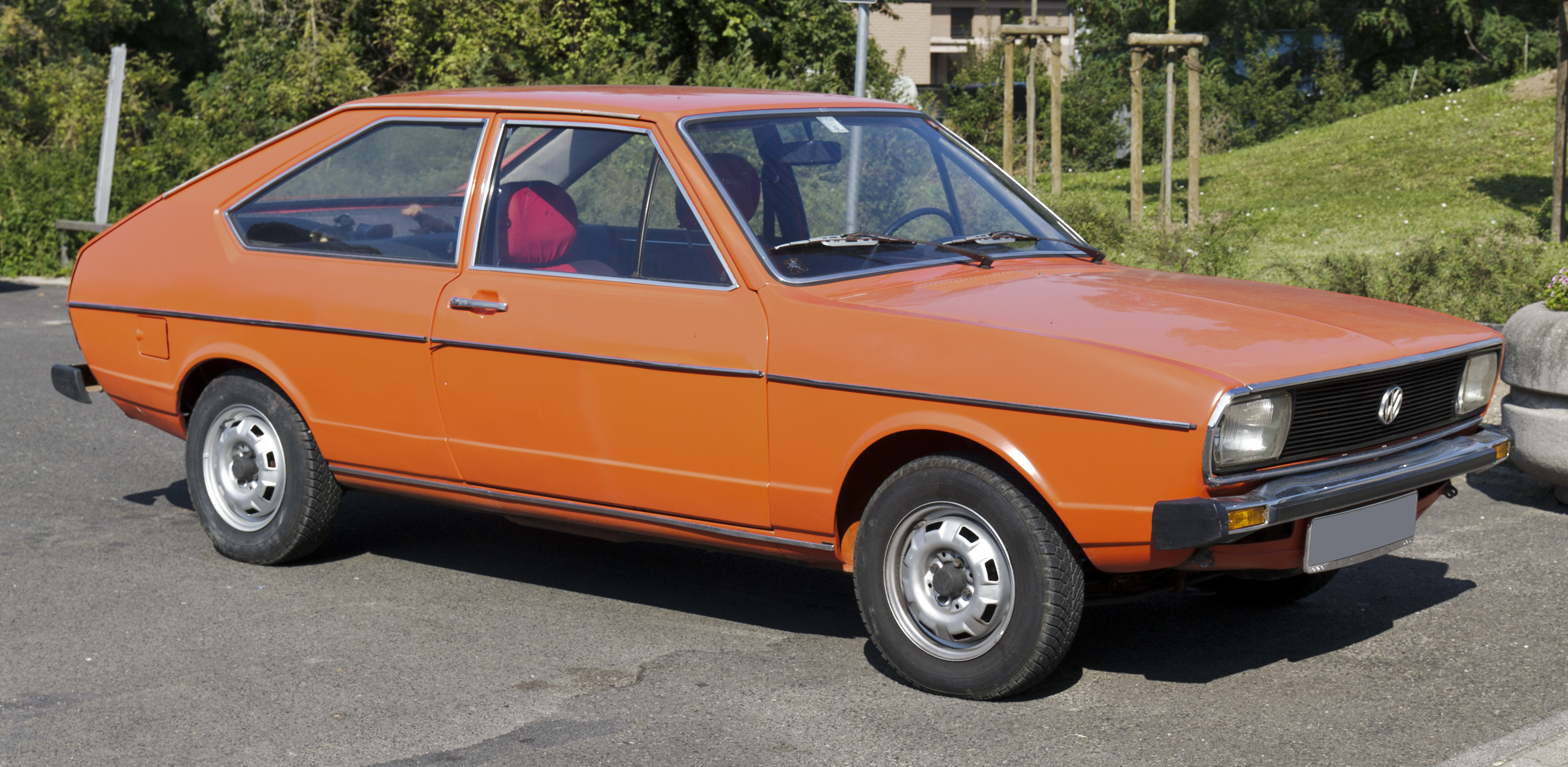
Volkswagen Passat B1 2-door sedan

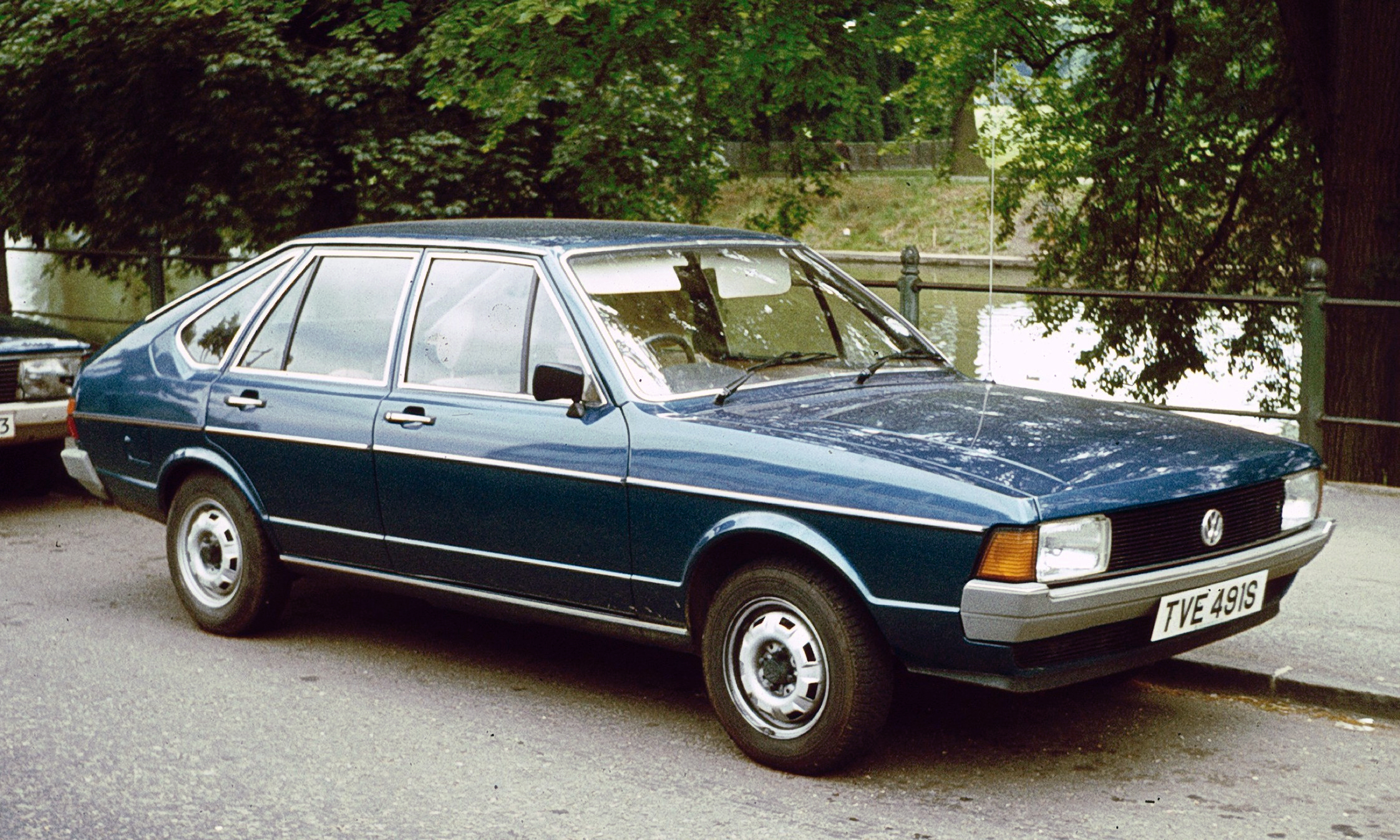
Volkswagen Passat B1 5-door hatchback (facelift)

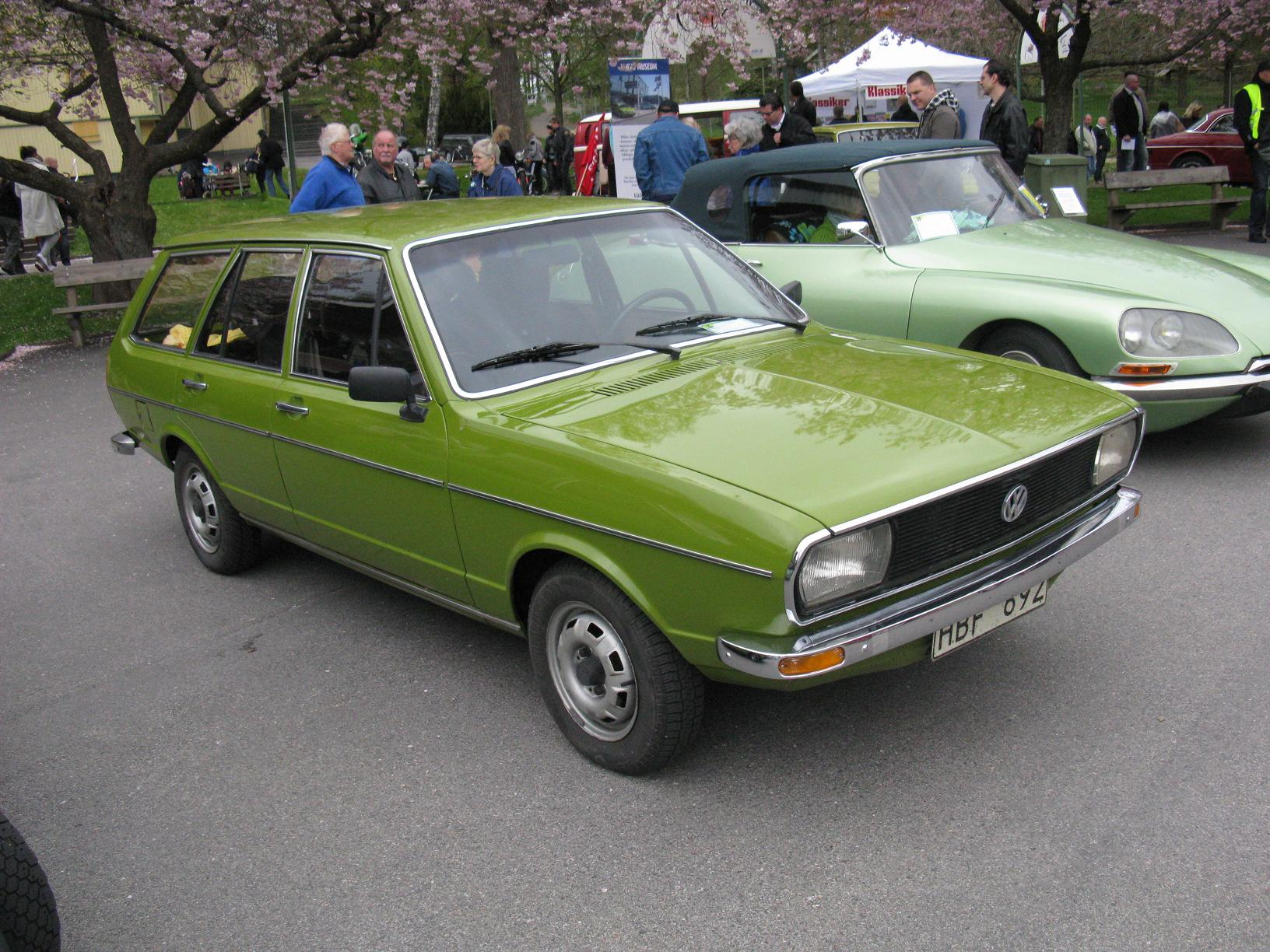
Volkswagen Passat B1 Variant 5-door estate

== Export markets ==
=== North America ===
In North America, the car was called the Volkswagen Dasher. The two- and four-door fastback sedans and a station wagon model were launched in North America for and during the 1974 model year. The sole available engine was a carburetted 1.5 L inline-four developing 75 hp (56 kW), down to 71 hp (53 kW) in 1975. For model year 1976 this was replaced by a Bosch fuel-injected 1.6 L four with 79 hp (59 kW), while the two-door sedan received the lifting tailgate always promised by its design. For 1977, power dropped by one horsepower, while Californian market cars were equipped with a catalytic converter and power was further down, to 76 hp (57 kW). North American cars were equipped with single DOT standard headlights.

In 1978 the Dasher received a facelift along the lines of the European Passat, with quad sealed beam headlights and big polyurethane covered bumpers. The trim was also upgraded and the ride softened. Various special editions were produced; the 1978 Champagne Edition II introduced the four-door hatchback bodywork for the first time. This replaced the four-door sedan entirely for 1979, which also saw the introduction of the 1.5 L diesel engine, which produced 48 hp (36 kW) in a 2,500 lb (1,134 kg) car. This version was not available as an Audi. The 0–100 km/h (62 mph) time for the Diesel was 19.4 seconds, 6.2 seconds slower than the gasoline (petrol) engine. All gasoline engines were dropped for North America in 1981 in preparation for the next generation, while the diesel increased in size to 1.6 liters.

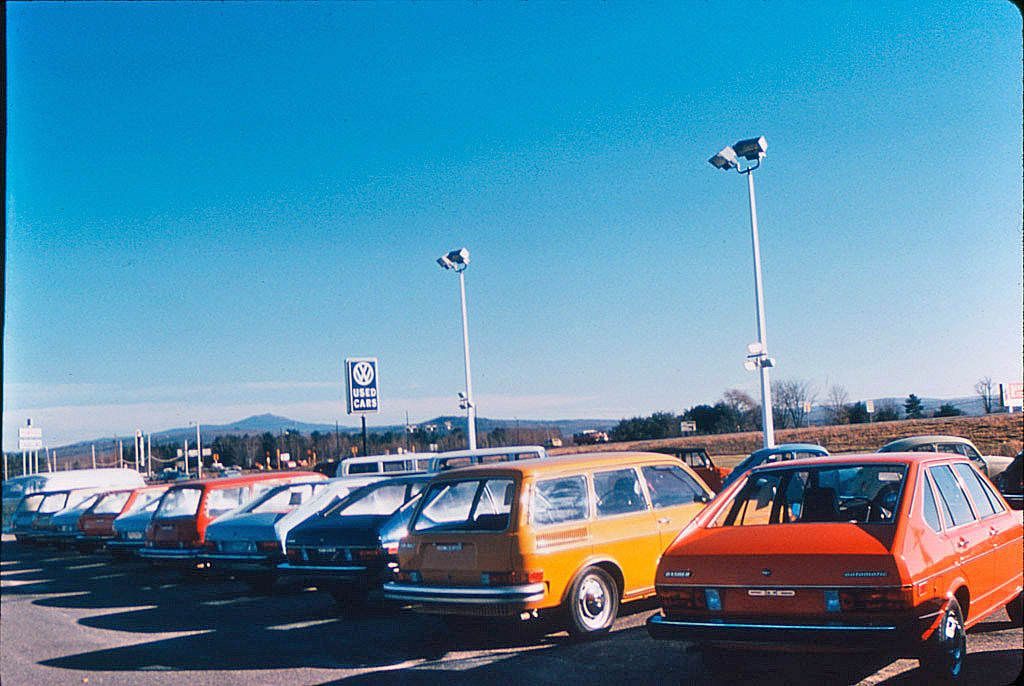
Period photo of Volkswagen Dashers alongside 412s at a dealership

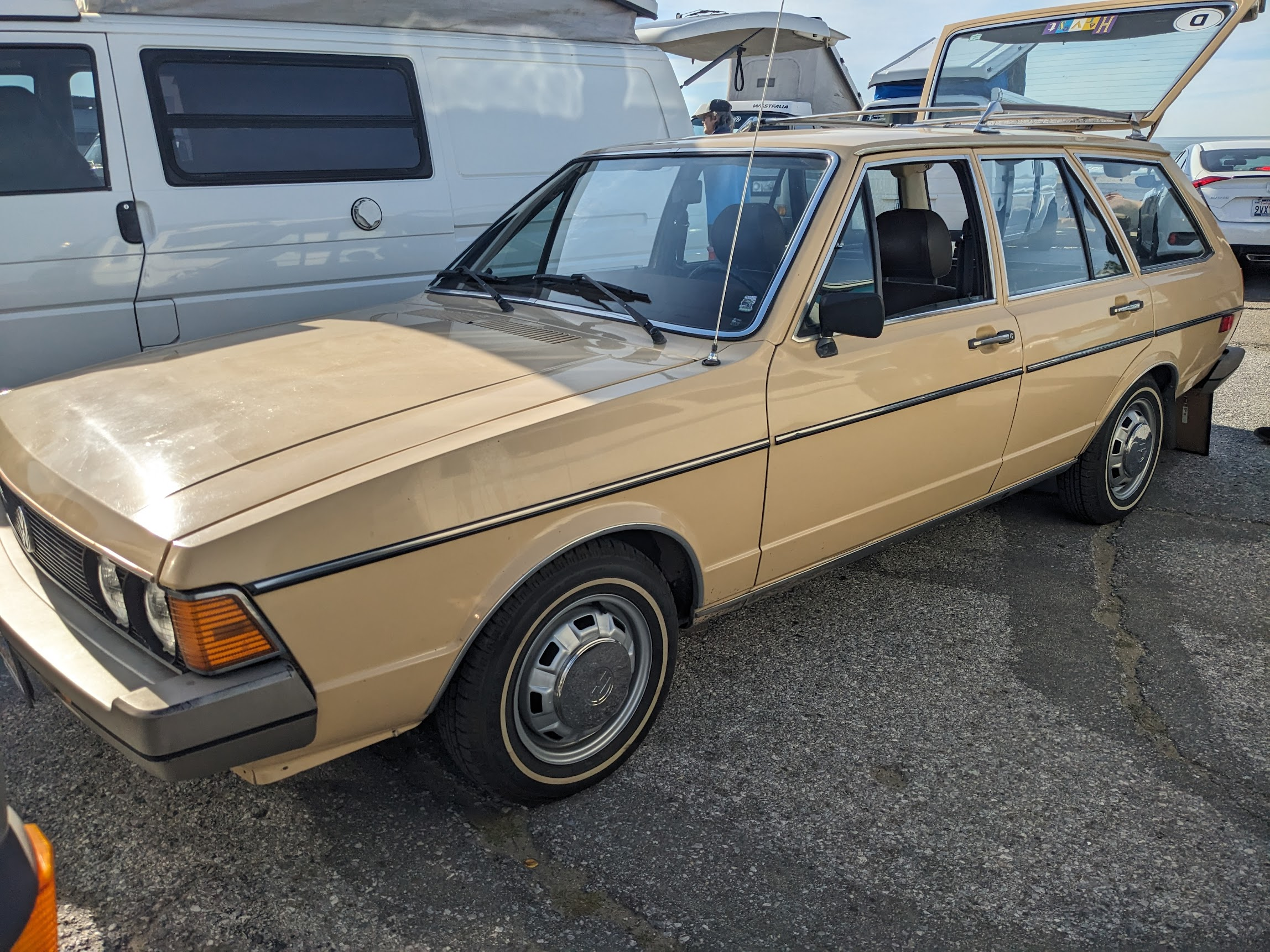
1979 Volkswagen Dasher Wagon

=== Australia ===
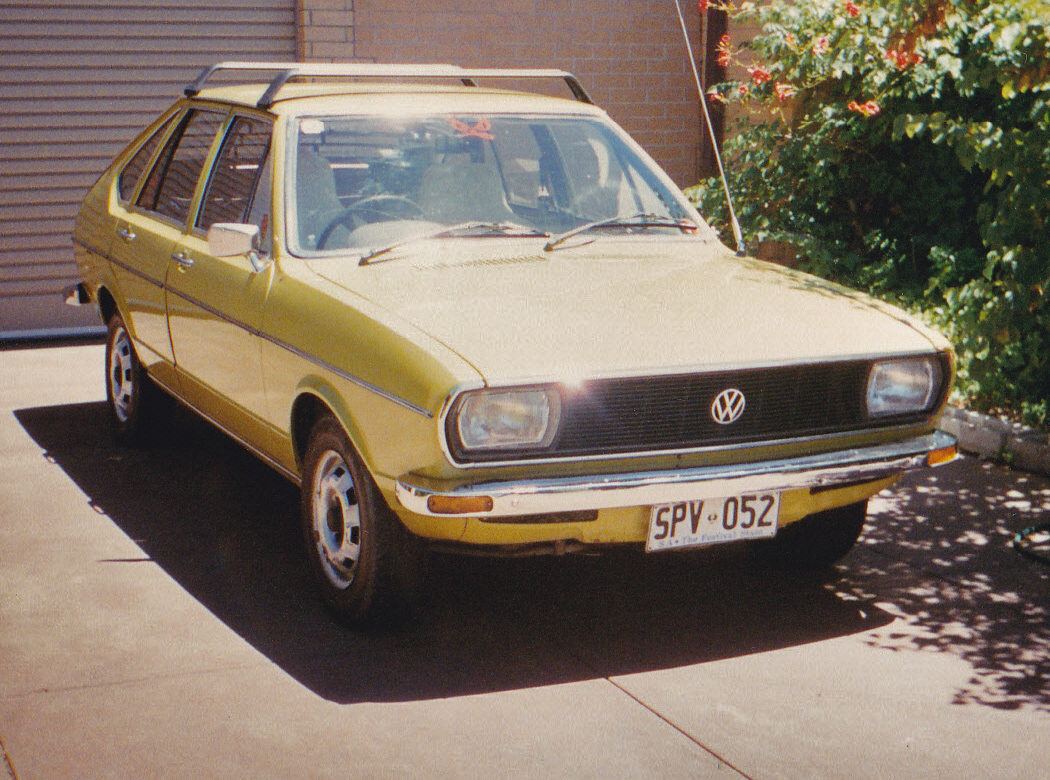
An Australian-assembled Passat LS (1977)

In Australia, the Passat was Wheels magazine's Car of the Year in 1974 and the car was assembled locally (CKD) from 1974 until 1977. It went on sale in February 1974, as a 2-door 1300 and a four-door 1500 (also available as a wagon beginning in May 1974). The smaller engine produces 69 hp (51 kW; 70 PS), while the bigger one offered 86 hp (64 kW; 87 PS). An automatic transmission was available on the larger engine, which was joined by the sporting 98 hp (73 kW; 99 PS) two-door 1500 TS version in May. The Passat immediately outsold the Beetle in the Australian market, although the T2 Transporter still sold more than Volkswagen's entire passenger car lineup. In 1976 Nissan took over Volkswagen's Australian operations and kept assembling the entire lineup, including the Passat. The two-door models were discontinued, with the LS sedan and wagon now equipped with a 1.6-liter engine. Nissan assembly only lasted until March 1977, when the entire range became fully imported.

The fully imported 1977 Passat GLS had a 53 kW (71 hp; 72 PS) 1588 cc engine and was originally only available as a two- or four-door sedan, at a sizable cost increase compared to the previous year. In spite of promises to keep up existing sales volumes, Passat volumes dropped by more than 70 percent. Sales dropped by another 70 percent in 1978, to 356 cars. In February 1979 the 1977 facelift model finally arrived, also heralding the introduction of the five-door hatchback bodywork, accompanied by the wagon. The 1.5 L diesel arrived in December 1979; sales in 1979 continued to freefall and only 90 cars were delivered. Originally available with inline-four petrol engines only the comparably successful 1.5 L diesel remained after late 1980. Sales tripled in 1980 and crept up to 287 in 1981, the last year new Volkswagen passenger cars were imported to Australia. The diesel model was available as a wagon or five-door hatchback (called "sedan"). Another 80 examples of the 1981 Passat Diesel were sold from existing stock in 1982.

=== South Africa ===
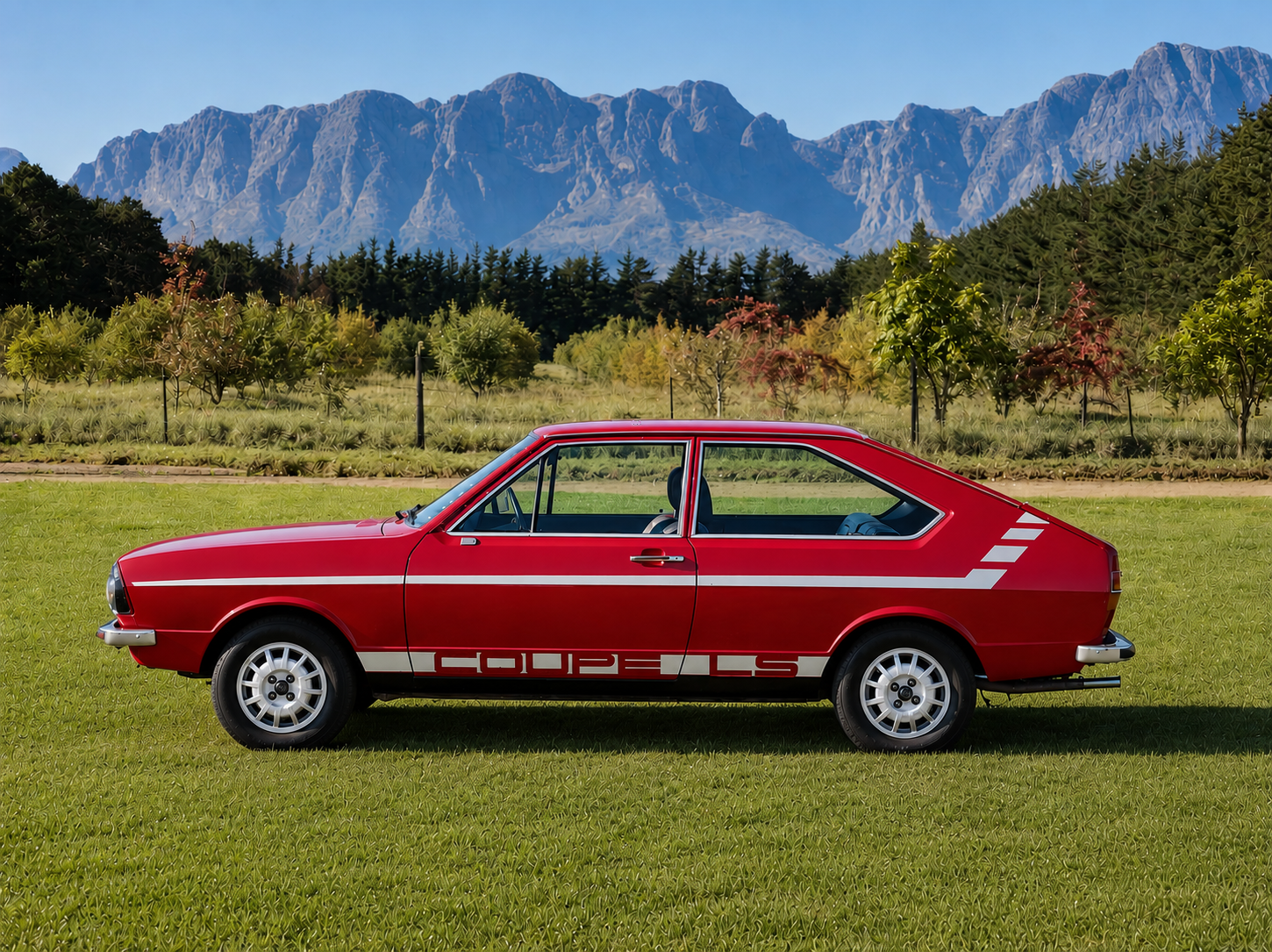
A South African built Volkswagen Passat LS Coupé (1977 facelift)

In South Africa, the Passat was sold with two- or four-door saloon bodywork, as well as the five-door Variant model. The two-door was only marketed as the upscale "LS Coupé", near the top of the price range. Equipment levels were L, LS, and later the LS de luxe. 1.3 or 1.6 L engines were available. For 1977, the five-door hatchback version arrived, badged "Passat LX." Some other light modifications were also carried out for 1977, slight improvements to the ventilation system, more equipment, and new hubcaps for the LS and LX versions. The South African market was the first to have facelift models featuring the frontal treatment of the Audi 80 facelift, starting in 1977. This trend of applying the updated Audi 80 frontal treatment to the Passat would continue onto the 1978 facelift for the 1979 model year. While the facelift for the 1979 model year was relatively mild from the South African standpoint, it was now identical to the one that surfaced in the South American market, which received the update for the first time in 1978, still featuring the Audi 80's front-end treatment, albeit with rectangular headlight units instead of the quad round units of the earlier facelift. The South African public caught an early glimpse of the 1979 model in the August 1978 issue of CAR Magazine, thereby getting treated to updates such as noise reduction modifications, suspension improvements, and wider wheels.

== B1 in Brazil ==
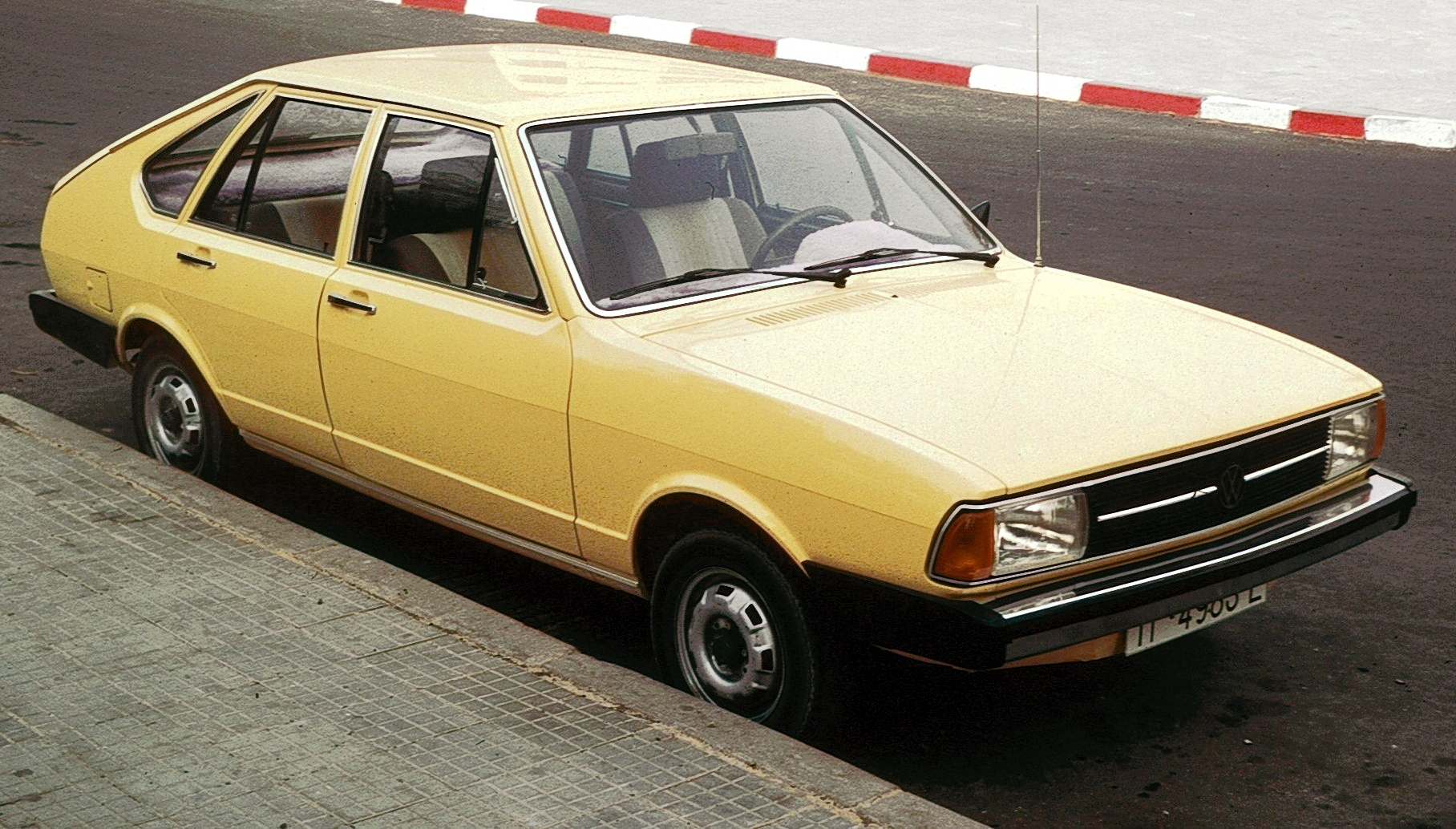
Facelifted Brazilian Passat four-door (1979–1983); note the Audi 80 headlights

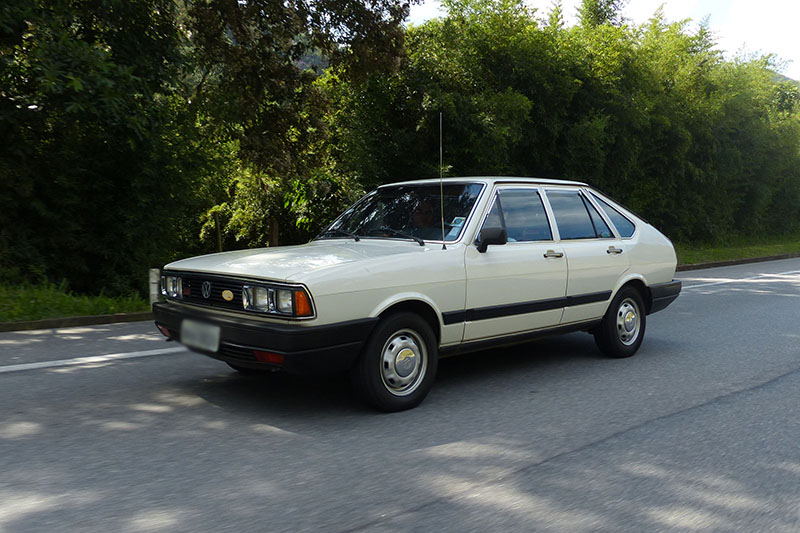
1986 Volkswagen Passat LSE, originally built for export to Iraq

In Brazil, the Passat B1 was produced from 1974 until 1988, originally with the 1.5-liter gasoline engine. A 1.6 was added with the 1976 introduction of the sportier TS 1.6 version, which received twin headlights. Since the Audi 80 was not marketed in Brazil, its front-end treatment was applied to the Passat in a facelift for 1979. Originally only available as a two or four-door fastback sedan, a three-door hatchback option was added in July 1976. During its long life cycle many improvements from the B2 platform were introduced, like its 1.6 and 1.8-liter engines and a five-speed gearbox. A second, Brazil-specific face-lift in 1983 brought quadruple rectangular headlights. The sporting TS 1.6 was later upgraded with a bigger engine, as the Passat GTS 1.8 Pointer. For export only, Volkswagen's 1.6 L diesel four-cylinder engine was also installed by Volkswagen do Brasil (VWB).

As a part of an overall export push by Volkswagen do Brasil, 170,000 "Passat LSE" were also built between 1983 and 1988 specifically for export to Iraq. These cars received various upgrades to suit Iraqi conditions, such as a protection plate for the engine, a stronger radiator, and standard air conditioning, and were bartered for oil which was transferred to Petrobras. As Petrobras' oil reserves grew larger than necessary, VWB found themselves with a large stock of Iraqi-spec cars that they were unable to export. In July 1986 local sales of these leftovers began. Despite being fitted with the old 72 PS 1.6 L MD270 engine and a four-speed transmission rather than the more powerful AP600 and the five-speed unit used in the then-current Brazilian cars, the LSE was an unexpected success in the Brazilian market.

The Passat represented a break with Volkswagen do Brasil's rear-engined, air-cooled traditions. It did well on introduction, being a much more modern car than the rest of the VWB lineup as well as the Ford Corcel, its closest competitor. After the introduction of the B2 Santana in 1984, however, the Passat began to show its age. The Passat continued to be produced until 1988, by which time a total of 676,819 Passats had been built in Brazil.

== Technical data ==
VW Passat B1 (1973–1980), Type 32, 33 (wagon)
VW Passat:	1.3 (until 02/1978)	1.3 (from 02/1978)	1.5 (until) 07/1974)	1.5 (08/1974–07/1975)	1.5 (until) 07/1975)	1.6 (from 08/1975)	1.6 (from 08/1975)	1.6 GLI (from 02/1979)	1.5 Diesel (from 08/1978)
Motor:	Inline-four cylinder engine (four-stroke)								
Engine Code:	ZA	FY	ZB	YJ	ZC	YN	YP	YS	CK
Displacement:	1297 cc	1272 cc	1471 cc			1588 cc			1471 cc
Bore × Stroke:	75 × 73.4 mm	75 × 72 mm	76.5 × 80 mm			79.5 × 80 mm			76.5 × 80 mm
Compression Ratio:	8.5	8.2	9.7	8.2	9.7	8.2	8.2	9.5	23.5
Max. Power at rpm:	40 kW (55 PS) 5500	40 kW (55 PS) 5800	55 kW (75 PS) 5800	55 kW (75 PS) 5800	63 kW (85 PS) 5800	55 kW (75 PS) 5600	63 kW (85 PS) 5600	81 kW (110 PS) 6100	37 kW (50 PS) 5000
Max. Torque at rpm:	94 Nm 2500	92 Nm 3500	116 Nm 3500	114 Nm 3500	123 Nm 4000	119 Nm 3200	124 Nm 3200	137 Nm 5000	80 Nm 3000
Fuel mixture formation:	One downdraft carburetor - Solex 85 PS variants: One dual-stage downdraft carburetor - Solex							Mechanical Fuel Injection (Bosch K-Jetronic)	Diesel: Distributor Pump injection
Valve Control:	OHC, timing belt								
Cooling:	Water Cooling								
Gearbox:	4 speed manual, optional for 75/85 PS engines: 3 speed automatic								
Front Suspension:	MacPherson Struts, with Lower Control Arms.								
Rear Suspension:	Torsion crank axle with progressive coil springs, Panhard rod for lateral guidance								
Brakes:	Front Disc Brakes (Ø 239 mm), Rear Drums (self-adjusting since 1979 model year), Brake Boosted								
Steering:	Rack and Pinion Steering								
Body:	Sheet Steel, self-supporting								
Track width front/rear:	1340/1350 mm								
Wheelbase:	2470 mm								
Length:	4190 mm (from 08/77: 4265–4290 mm)								
Curb Weight:	880–995 kg								
Top Speed:	150 km/h	150 km/h	155–160 km/h	155–160 km/h	163–168 km/h	156–160 km/h	165–173 km/h	185 km/h	141 km/h
Acceleration time from 0–100 km/h:	16–17 s	16–17 s	13.5–16 s	13.5–16 s	12–15 s	13.5–16 s	12–14.5 s	10.5–11.5 s	20.5-21.5 s
Fuel Consumption (L/100km), required fuel	9–10, Normal	9–10, Normal	10.5–11.5 Super	10.5–11.5 Normal	10.0–11.0 Super	10.5–11.0 Normal	10.5–11.0 Normal	10.5 Super	7.5 Diesel
