= Ford Verona =

Small family car

Ford Verona/Volkswagen Apollo
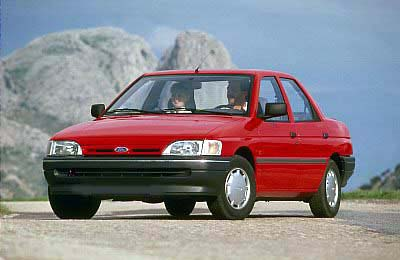

Overview
- Manufacturer: Autolatina
- Also called: Volkswagen Apollo; Ford Orion
- Production: 1989–1992; 1993–1996

Body and chassis
- Class: Compact/Small family car (C)
- Layout: Front-engine, front-wheel drive

Chronology
- Predecessor: Ford Del Rey
- Successor: Ford Escort saloon

The Ford Verona and Volkswagen Apollo are a pair of small family cars that were manufactured in Brazil by Autolatina, a joint venture between Brazilian subsidiaries of Ford and Volkswagen. The Verona was produced from 1989 to 1992 and from 1993 to 1996, initially as a direct replacement for the ageing Ford Del Rey.

The company spent US$100 million developing and producing the car, which is heavily based on the second generation Ford Orion, and competed mainly with the Chevrolet Monza in the local market. The first generation had the characteristic of being a two-door sedan with a unique rear end, and the only derivation of the fourth generation Ford Escort with this body style, and was also rebadged as the Volkswagen Apollo.

Autolatina ceased production of the Verona/Apollo in 1992, after only three years of the original release, but still produced locally the third generation Orion a year after and keeping the Verona nameplate, until it was replaced by the sixth generation Ford Escort saloon in 1996.

== First generation (1989–1992) ==
First generation
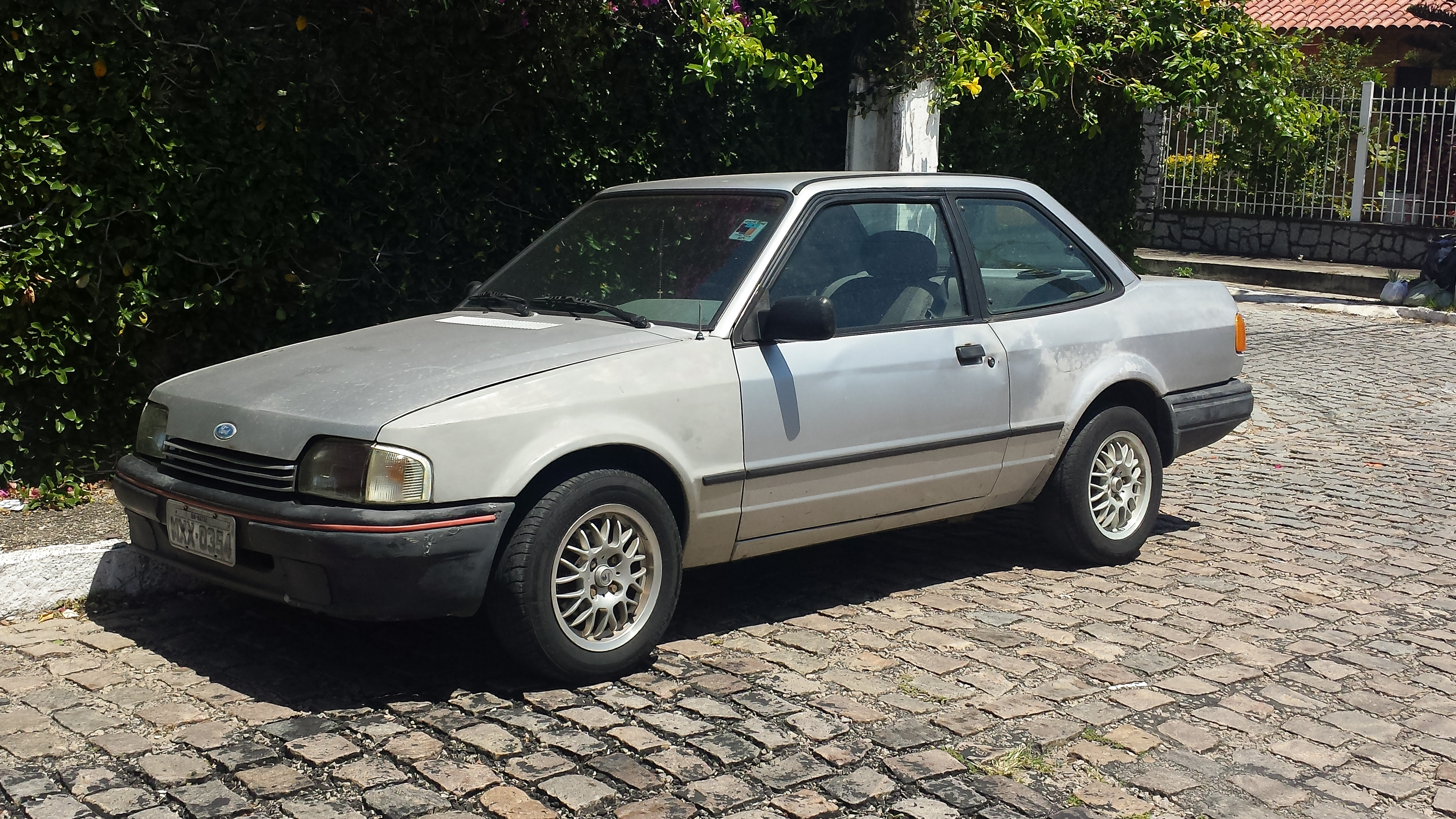

Overview
- Also called: Volkswagen Apollo
- Production: 1989–1992
- Assembly: Brazil: São Bernardo do Campo (Ford Brazil)

Body and chassis
- Body style: 2-door sedan
- Related: Ford Orion; Ford Escort

Powertrain
- Engine: 1.6 L AE 1600; 1.8 L AP 1800
- Transmission: 5-speed manual

Dimensions
- Wheelbase: 2,402 mm (94.6 in)
- Length: 4,215 mm (165.9 in)
- Width: 1,640 mm (64.6 in)
- Height: 1,331 mm (52.4 in)
- Curb weight: 955–980 kg (2,105–2,161 lb)

The first generation Verona was released in November 1989, as Ford's Brazilian subsidiary wanted a stronger competitor for the mid-size segment leader at the time, the Chevrolet Monza, despite being based from a lower segment car. It was heavily based on the second generation of the European Ford Orion, which in turn was based on the "Erika" third generation Ford Escort platform of 1981. Compared to the European Orion, the Verona had a unique body style, being a two-door sedan with a higher rear design and horizontal tail lights, the styling of which strongly resembled the sedan (Sapphire) version of the European Ford Sierra. The two cars are also mechanically different, and while the Orion was only available in the four-door body style, the Verona was only available with two doors. It lacked some features available in the Orion, for example the folding rear seats, to reduce production costs.

In 1986, Argentine and Brazilian subsidiaries of Volkswagen and Ford formed the Autolatina joint venture, leading to a series of badge engineered cars. The Verona was the first model to be rebranded during the alliance and its sibling was the Volkswagen Apollo, released in 1990. The alliance also allowed Ford to have access to more powerful engines, better suited to the segment it would compete, since one of the most common complaints in the Ford Del Rey it would replace was its poor performance.

Code named Nevada, the Verona development cost US$70,000,000 to Ford do Brasil, and aimed to create a competitive car for the midsize segment without excessive spending, due to the bad financial situation of the subsidiary at the time. Another US$30,000,000 were used to update the São Bernardo do Campo assembly line, where the car was produced. It was considered to build a four-door Ford Orion in Brazil, but two-door sedans were more suitable to local demand, which led to the creation of the Verona. The final name was chosen in computer, among other 21 options, including Stallion, Novara and the proper project code name Nevada.

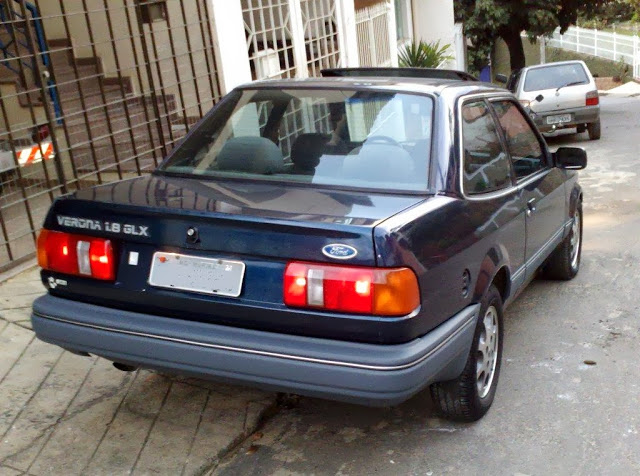
Ford Verona (rear view)

LX and GLX were the two trim lines available for the Verona, the first one carried by a 1.6 L CHT engine and the last by a 1.8 L Volkswagen AP engine, both with ethanol and petrol variants. Base model was the LX and could be equipped with green glasses, rear window defroster, AM/FM stereo and power mirrors, while the GLX was the upscale trim level and could be equipped with fog lights, aluminum wheels, lumbar support adjustment, Bosch radio/cassette player with code to inhibit theft and power mirrors. Air conditioning and sunroof were also optional features in the GLX trim. Unlike its Apollo twin, the Verona dashboard was identical to the Ford Escort one. The last model year offered 14 pol aluminum wheels as an optional feature. That same year, the Verona was discontinued in the South American market.

In a 1989 road test conducted by a Brazilian magazine, the Verona 1.8 L managed to go from 0 to 100 km/h in 11,72 seconds and reached a maximum speed of 168.3 km/h. In this same road test, dynamometer measurements determined that ethanol engines produced 105 PS, while Ford would publicize this engine as it only produced 99 PS. This was done to avoid a higher tax on the circulation of goods (ICM) for ethanol engines for cars with power above 100 PS.

Specifications for each engine can be found in the table below.

Name	Displacement	Engine	Fuel	Bore x Stroke	Compression ratio	Output	Torque
1.6 AE (AE 1600)	1.555 cm³	4cyl	Petrol	77 x 83,5 mm	9.0:1	76.5 PS (56 kW; 75 hp) @5200 rpm	130.7 N⋅m (96 lb⋅ft) @3200 rpm
1.6 AE (AE 1600)	1.555 cm³	4cyl	Ethanol	77 x 83,5 mm	12.0:1	77.9 PS (57 kW; 77 hp) @5200 rpm	130.5 N⋅m (96 lb⋅ft) @3200 rpm
1.8 UD (AP 1800)	1.781 cm³	4cyl	Petrol	81 x 86,4 mm	8.5:1	91 PS (67 kW; 90 hp) @5500 rpm	142.2 N⋅m (105 lb⋅ft) @3400
1.8 UD (AP 1800)	1.781 cm³	4cyl	Ethanol	81 x 86,4 mm	12.3:1	105 PS (77 kW; 104 hp) @5500 rpm	152 N⋅m (112 lb⋅ft) @3400 rpm

Note: AE is an acronym for "Alta Economia" (High Fuel-Efficiency in English), AP stands for "Alta Performance" (High Performance in English).

=== Volkswagen Apollo ===
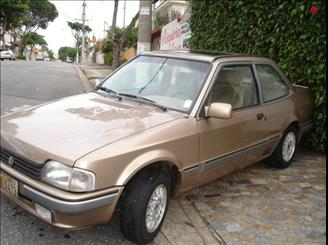
VW Apollo front fascia.

The Apollo was essentially a re-branded Ford Verona sold from 1990 to 1992. More expensive and marketed as a sportier model, it was only available with the 1.8 L AP engine. Compared with the Verona, it has only minor differences. These are shorter gear ratios, stiffer shock absorbers, different dashboard with orange lighting (unlike the Verona, the Apollo do not share its dashboard with the Escort), smoked tail lights very similar to the ones from the Ford Sapphire, chrome-less rear window frames, fixed-height front seats, painted mirrors (GLS trim) and airfoil. During the first model years, its front turn signals had clear lenses while the Verona had orange lenses. Trim levels were GL (base model) and GLS. A special edition named VIP was released in 1991.

A recurrent complaint from Apollo owners was the usage of steel rod-operated gear shift instead of the commonly used cable-operated gear shift. Both Verona and Apollo had cambering issues as well, partially due to rear suspension's project that was not adequately designed for a saloon.

== Second generation (1993–1996) ==
Second generation
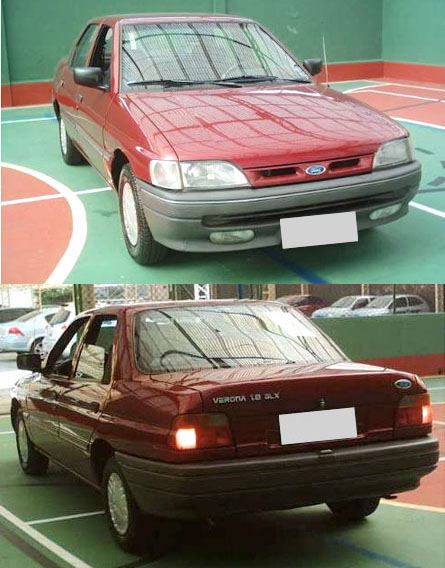

Overview
- Also called: Ford Orion (Argentina)
- Production: 1993–1996
- Assembly: Brazil: São Bernardo do Campo (Ford Brazil); Argentina: General Pacheco (Ford Argentina)

Body and chassis
- Body style: 4-door sedan
- Related: Ford Orion; Ford Escort

Powertrain
- Engine: 1.8 L AP-1800; 2.0 L AP-2000
- Transmission: 5-speed manual

Dimensions
- Wheelbase: 2,525 mm (99.4 in)
- Length: 4,229 mm (166.5 in)
- Width: 1,690 mm (66.5 in)
- Height: 1,369 mm (53.9 in)
- Curb weight: 1,060–1,145 kg (2,337–2,524 lb)

The Verona discontinued in 1992 was relaunched in late 1993, this time sharing its body style with the third generation Ford Orion and only available as a four-door sedan.

Three trims were offered, a base (LX), an intermediate (GLX) with power steering, power windows and locks and also an upscale (Ghia), the first two with the 1.8 L AP engine and the Ghia with the 2.0 L AP. The 1.6 L CHT engine was discontinued. In 1995, the 1.8 L gained electronic fuel injection, the LX version was renamed GL and the Ghia gained a new digital electronic fuel injection from FIC (standing for Ford Indústria e Comércio - Ford Industry and Trade, the brand's division of electronic components), replacing the old analog Bosch LE Jetronic fuel injection. That same year, a new version was added to the line, the sportier 2.0i S, available with Recaro seats, air conditioning, cassette player and disc brakes in four wheels.

In 1996, the Verona was facelifted, with a new hood and the oval grille. Production also shifted from São Bernardo do Campo to Pacheco, Argentina, where it was marketed as Ford Orion. That same year, the sixth generation of the Ford Escort went on sale and the Verona nameplate was dropped and replaced by the Escort Sedan.

In a 1993 road test, the Verona went from 0-100 km/h (62 mph) in 11.1 seconds and reached a maximum velocity of 186.6 km/h. The drag coefficient is 0.31.

Specifications for engines available can be found in the table below.

Name	Displacement	Engine	Fuel	Bore x Stroke	Compression ratio	Output	Torque
1.8 AP (AP 1800)	1.781 cm³	4cyl	Petrol	81 x 86,4 mm	8.5:1	91.1 PS (67 kW; 90 hp) @5500 rpm	142 N⋅m (105 lb⋅ft) @3000
1.8 AP (AP 1800)	1.781 cm³	4cyl	Ethanol	81 x 86,4 mm	12.3:1	105 PS (77 kW; 104 hp) @5500 rpm	152 N⋅m (112 lb⋅ft) @3400 rpm
2.0 AP (AP 2000)	1.984 cm³	4cyl	Petrol	82,5 x 92,8 mm	9.0:1	108 PS (79 kW; 107 hp) @5400 rpm	167 N⋅m (123 lb⋅ft) @3400
2.0 AP (AP 2000)	1.984 cm³	4cyl	Ethanol	82,5 x 92,8 mm	12.0:1	115.6 PS (85 kW; 114 hp) @5400 rpm	172 N⋅m (127 lb⋅ft) @3400 rpm
2.0i AP (AP 2000i)	1.984 cm³	4cyl	Petrol	82,5 x 92,8 mm	10.0:1	120.1 PS (88 kW; 118 hp) @5600 rpm	174 N⋅m (128 lb⋅ft) @3200 rpm

== Sales ==
In 1990, the Verona was the 7th best-selling car in Brazil, the Apollo was the 17th. The following year, the Verona rose to the 6th place and the Apollo to the 8th. In the last production year, they both fell to 9th and 15th positions, respectively. Total production of the Volkswagen Apollo was 53,130 units. Sales figures from both cars in Brazil are shown below.

Calendar Year	Verona	Apollo
1990	33,248	13,494
1991	32,676	26,976
1992	20,243	10,437
1993	3,462	—
1994	15,142	—
1995	6,940	—
1996	6,614	—

== See also ==
- Volkswagen Apollo
- Ford Escort (Europe)
- Ford Orion
