= Ford Pampa =

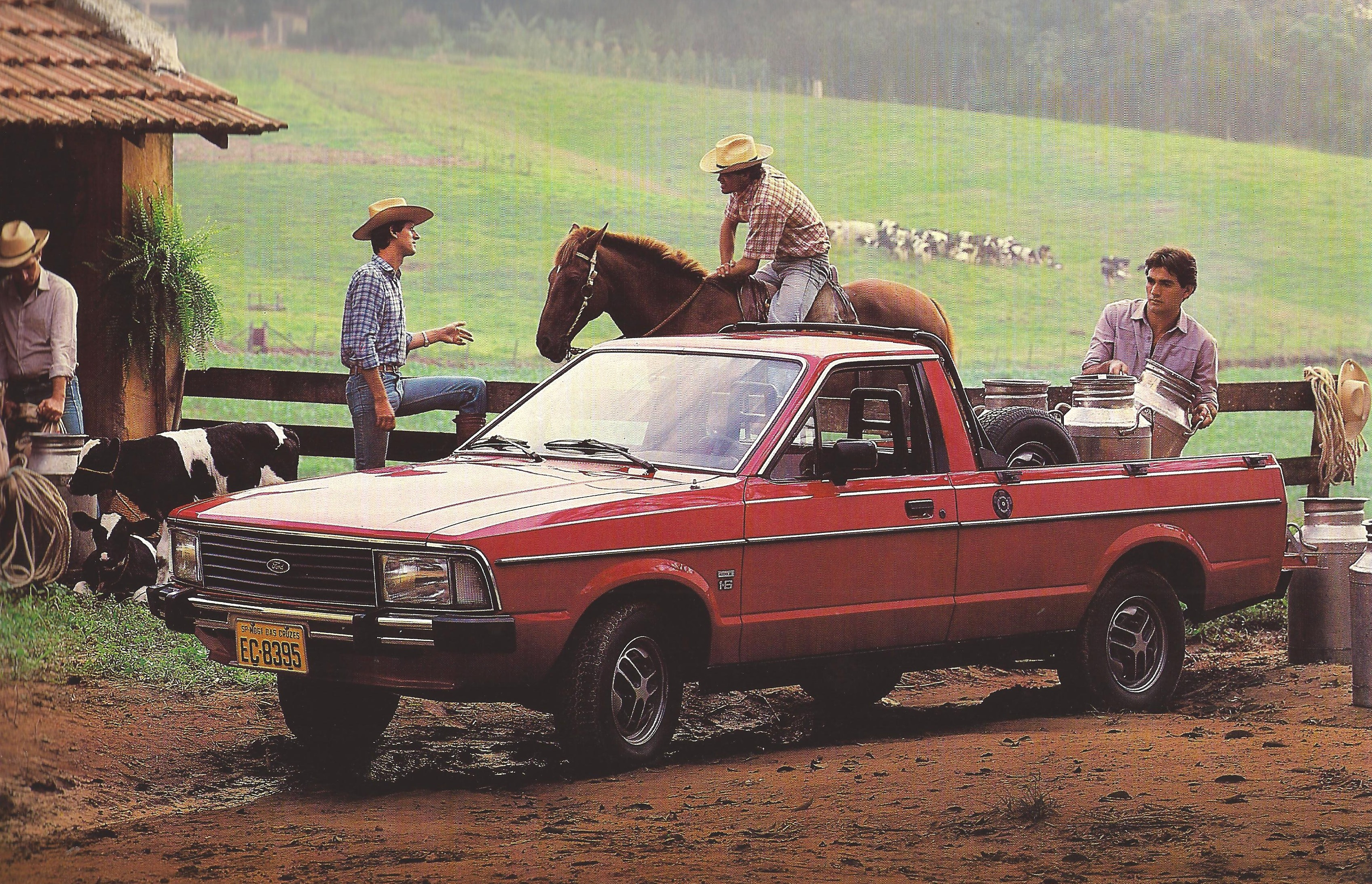
- Ford Pampa displayed on a Brazilian brochure

Overview
- Manufacturer: Ford do Brasil
- Production: 1982–1997
- Assembly: Brazil: São Bernardo do Campo

Body and chassis
- Body style: 2-door Coupé utility
- Layout: Front-engine, front-wheel-drive layout Front-engine, four-wheel-drive layout
- Related: Ford Corcel; Ford Del Rey

Powertrain
- Engine: 1,555 cc Cléon-Fonte OHV I4; 1,555 cc CHT OHV I4; 1,781 cc VW AP-1800 I4
- Transmission: 4/5-speed manual

Dimensions
- Wheelbase: 2,578 mm (101.5 in)
- Length: 4,425 mm (174.2 in)
- Width: 1,674 mm (65.9 in)
- Height: 1,401 mm (55.2 in)
- Curb weight: 1,015–1,050 kg (2,238–2,315 lb)

Chronology
- Successor: Ford Courier

The Ford Pampa is a coupe utility manufactured by Ford do Brasil between 1982 and 1997. It was derived from the Ford Corcel and Ford Del Rey, and was the best-selling coupe utility in Brazil for several years.

The Ford Pampa was replaced by the Fiesta-based Ford Courier in the small pickup market of South America.

== The launch ==
In 1982, Ford do Brasil launched the pickup based on the Ford Corcel II. It was the second such vehicle in the segment, then after the Fiat Fiorino (known at the time as the City), pickup derived from the Fiat 147. The name Pampa alludes to a horse that has the body all threshed. The Pampa had the comfort of a car in the cabin, but the robustness of a utility vehicle with a more superior load capacity than its smaller competitor. It had the front of a Corcel II and a loading bay inspired by the much larger US-style F-100 pickup of the time. The difference between the Fiat pickup and the Ford is that the former used the same independent back suspension of Fiat 147, whereas the Ford had a rigid rear axle and adopted semielliptical springs in place of coil springs, more suitable for carrying heavy loads. Due to its success, other brands soon followed suit in launching their own derivatives, Volkswagen with the Saveiro (appearing in the same year, it was derived from the Volkswagen Gol hatchback) and Chevrolet with Chevy 500 (derived from the Chevette) in 1983.

== Technical specifications ==
Using the same 1.6-liter engine and a four- or five-speed manual gearbox from the Corcel, came with the differential of Corcel 1:4 to better use to advantage the force of the engine. It also had the front suspension of the Corcel, with stiffer springs and shock absorbers to support bigger loads. Thus, the Pampa was perfect for the transport of loads up to 620 kg (1,367 lb). With regard to the Corcel, the wheelbase was also increased. The fuel tank in the Pampa was soon moved to behind the cabin, and its doors were made smaller - identical to the ones of the four-door Ford Del Rey. With the 1.6 engine, the Pampa developed 66 hp (49 kW), perfect for the transport of the most varied loads and 69 hp (51 kW) with the model which ran on alcohol. The Pampa pickup had very good general performance. Its maximum speed was of 100 mph (160 km/h) and its fuel tank had a 76-liter capacity. The Pampa’s options included a digital clock, air conditioning, adjustable head restraints, radio, and inertia reel seat belts. Many of these items were found in the luxurious Del Rey.

== 1984-model revisions ==
Revisions for the 1984 model year included the Pampa receiving the Ford CHT engine, which was more powerful and economical. The 1.6-liter CHT engine developed 75 hp (56 kW) in alcohol form and the petrol version 73 hp (54 kW), giving the Pampa a maximum speed of 160 or 156 km/h (99 or 97 mph), respectively. Also for the 1984 model year, a 4x4 version was launched, which would be only Brazilian pickup derived from a two-wheel drive car to be offered with four-wheel drive. Externally, the 4x4 Pampa had few differences compared with the 4x2 version; the 4x4 had squared-off grating in the grille, off-road tires, free-wheeling wheel hubs, and over-riders on the bumpers.

== 1986-model revisions ==
In 1986, L and GL models were introduced and Pampa models received the front from the 4x4 version. For the 1987 model year, the Pampa got the new front from the Del the Rey and the Ghia version was added to the range with the luxury equipment of the Del Rey Ghia, including electric windows. However, air conditioning was only an optional extra. For the Pampa in 1989, the larger VW AP-1800 engine became available for the L, GL, and Ghia versions, although the 1.6-liter CHT engine remained in the L and GL 4x4 versions. For 1991, the S version arrived, with the same 1.8-liter motor as the Gol GTS and Escort XR3. This was more powerful and quicker, enabling a top speed of 106 mph (171 km/h). Standard equipment included side rubbing strakes, a dipping rear view mirror, optional hydraulic power-assisted steering, alloy wheels, front spoiler with integral fog lights and items which were standard on the Ghia version.

== 1992-model revisions and final production ==
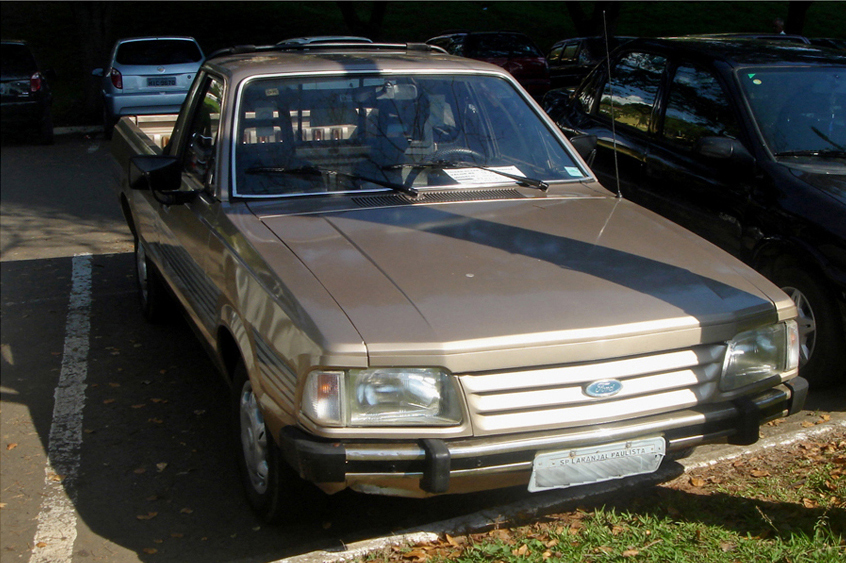
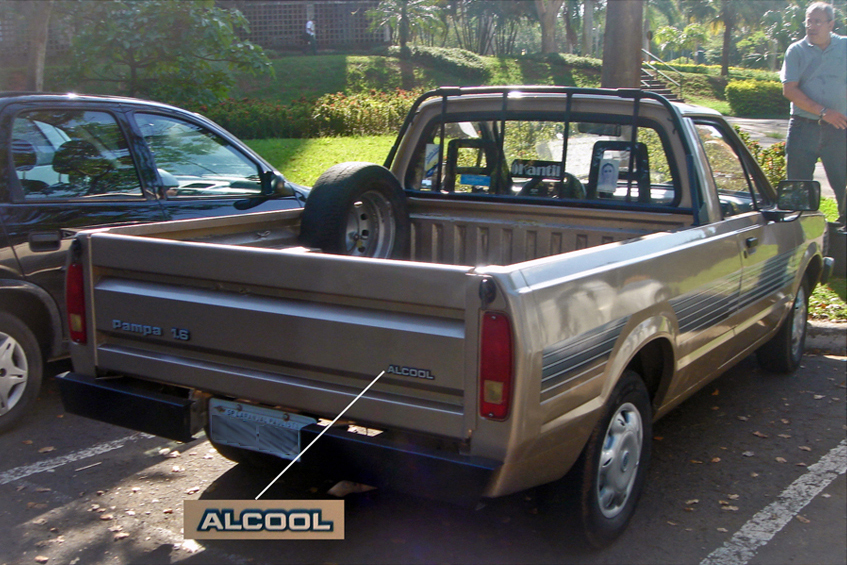
1992–1997 Ford Pampa 1.6-liter (ethanol-fueled)

In 1992, the Pampa received another new front, identical to the Del Rey, which had been discontinued in 1991. In 1994, it received an electronically controlled carburettor (2E CE) in the 1.8-liter versions, following the alterations to the VW AP-1800 unit. In 1995, the Ghia and 1.6 L GL 4x4 were discontinued, leaving the 1.6- and 1.8-liter L, 1.8-liter GL, and 1.8-liter S. For the 1997 model year, the 1.8-liter engines were equipped with single-point electronic fuel injection. By the end of production in 1997, in excess of 350,000 units had been sold. Its replacement, the Ford Courier, never achieved the same sales success.
