= Ford Caminhões =

Defunct Brazilian truck manufacturer

Ford Trucks
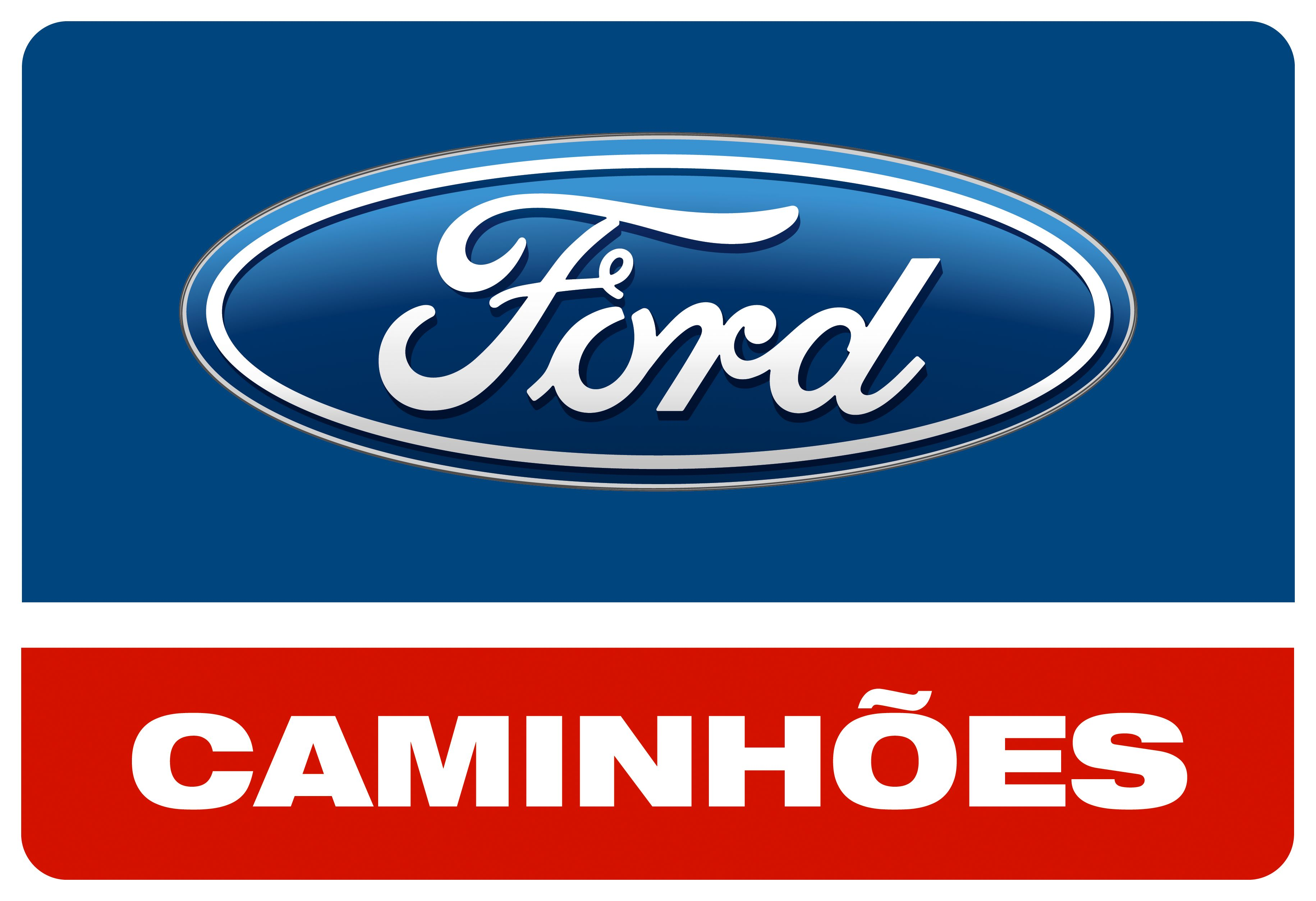
- Industry: Automotive
- Founded: 1957
- Defunct: 2019
- Fate: Dissolved
- Headquarters: São Bernardo do Campo, Brazil
- Products: Trucks and Vans
- Number of employees: 2,800
- Parent: Ford Brasil

Ford Caminhões was a division of Ford Brasil that has truck production lines in Brazil. The first cargo vehicles produced by North American Ford were derived from the Ford Model T, called TT, and were produced from 1917. The Model TTs were imported from the beginning of the Brazilian subsidiary's operations in 1919.

== History ==
Ford Caminhões launched its first national truck, the F-600, which left the assembly line on August 26, 1957, following the Target Plan of Juscelino Kubitschek's government. The nationalization index was 40% with the V8 gasoline engine still imported. In 1958 it began to receive the Y-block V8 engine produced in Brazil.

Local production by Ford Brasil began in 1957 with the Ford F-Series models and the Cargo line, the latter since 1985.

In 2019, Ford announced the closure of the truck plant in Brazil.

== Gallery ==
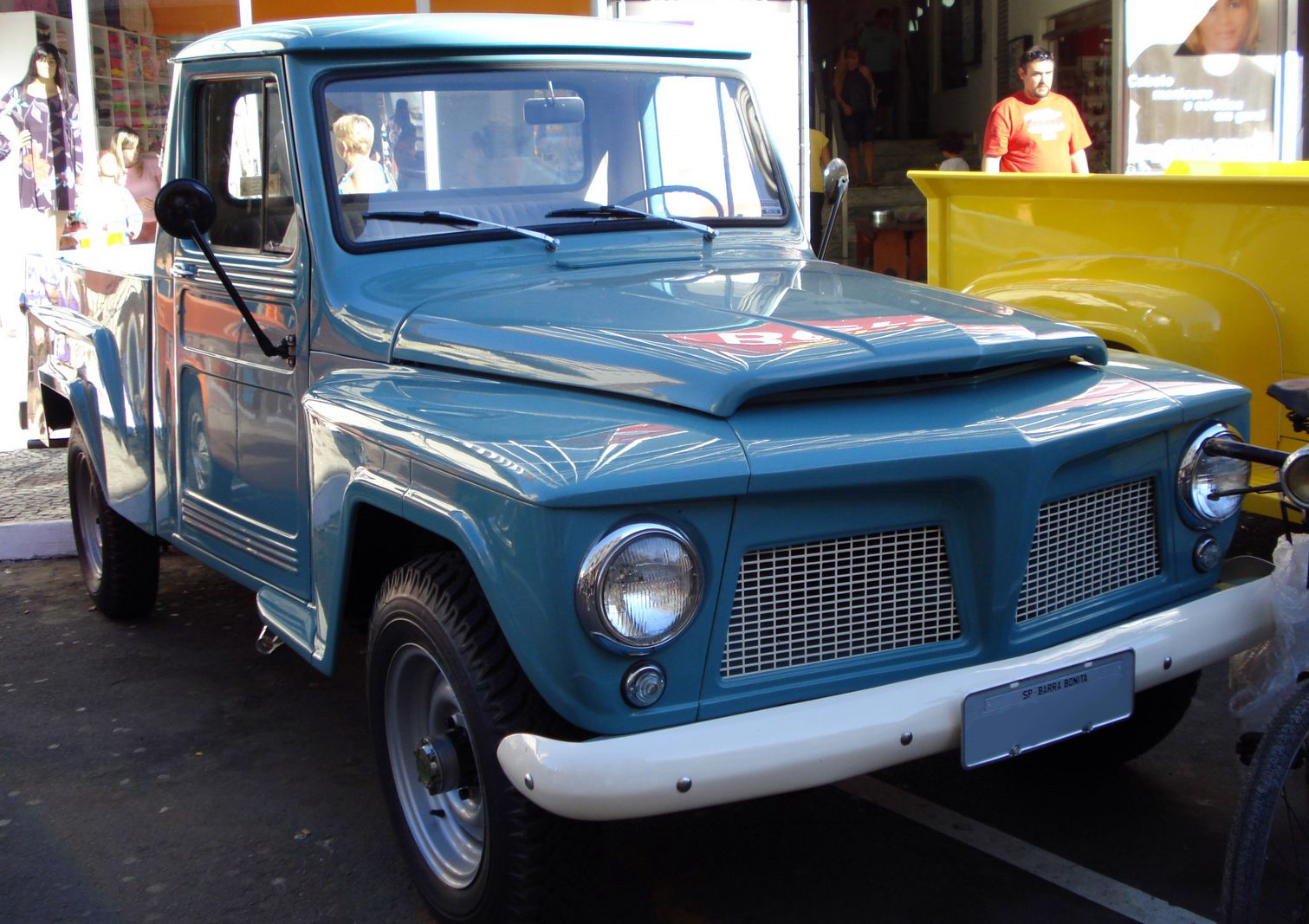
Ford F-75

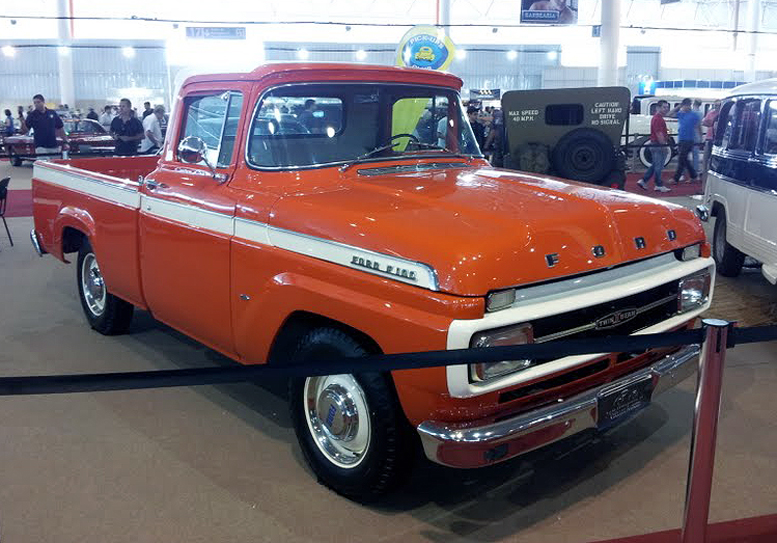
Ford F-100

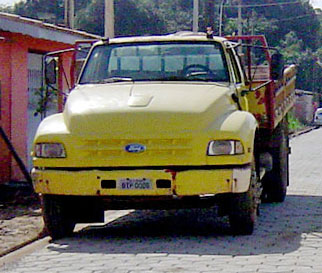
Ford F-12000

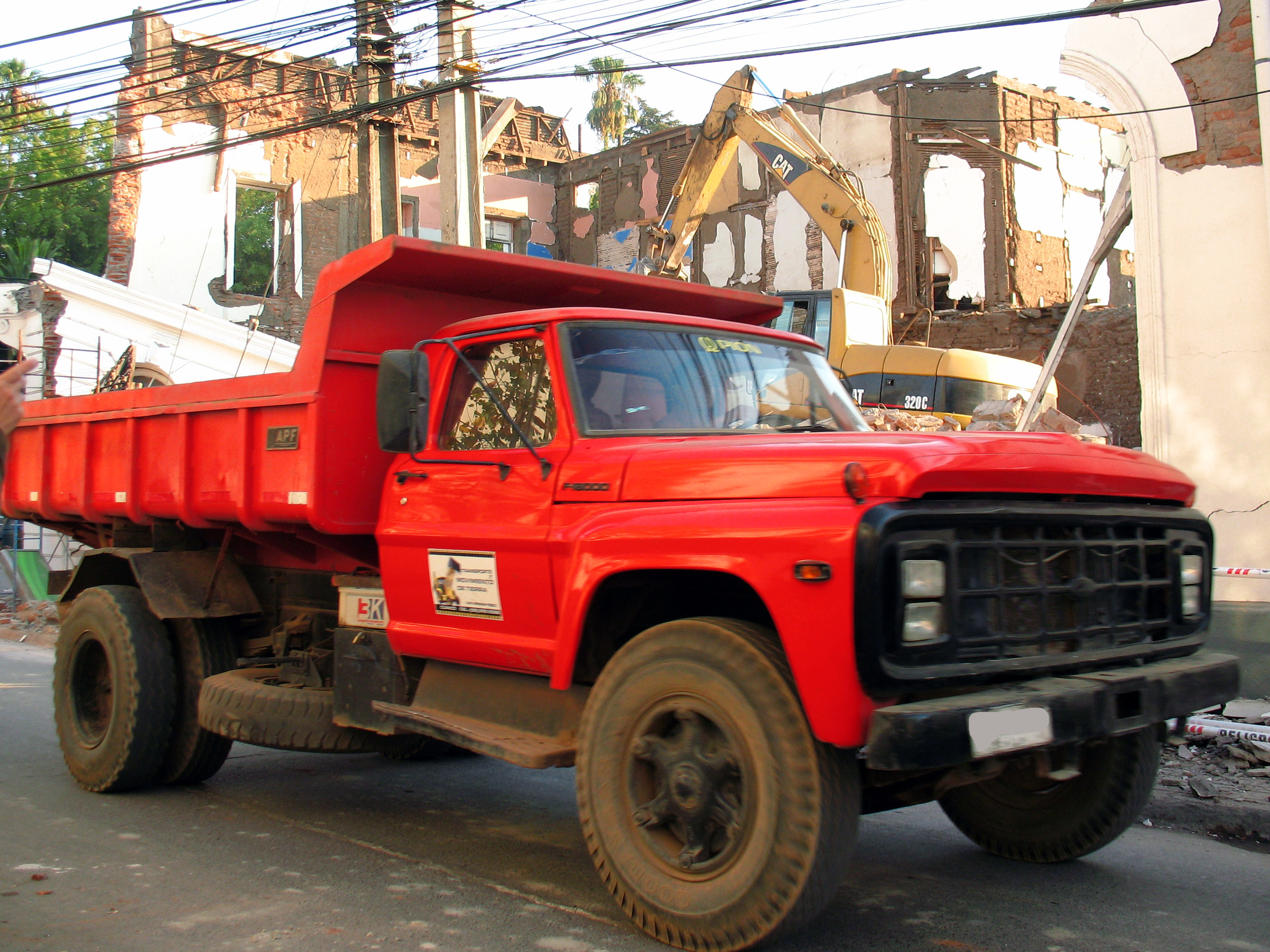
Ford F-13000

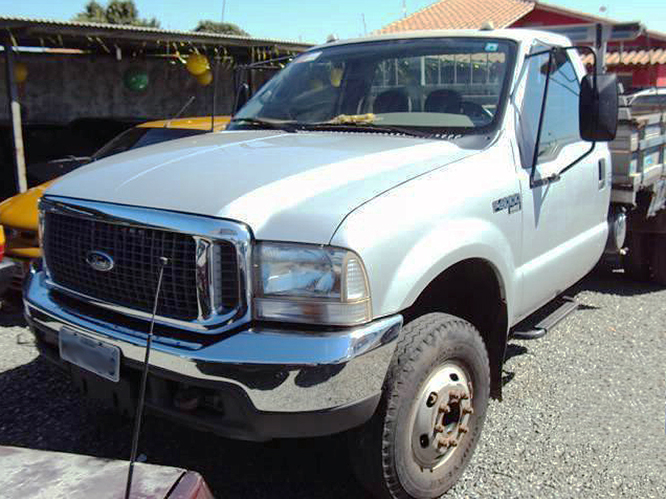
Ford F-4000

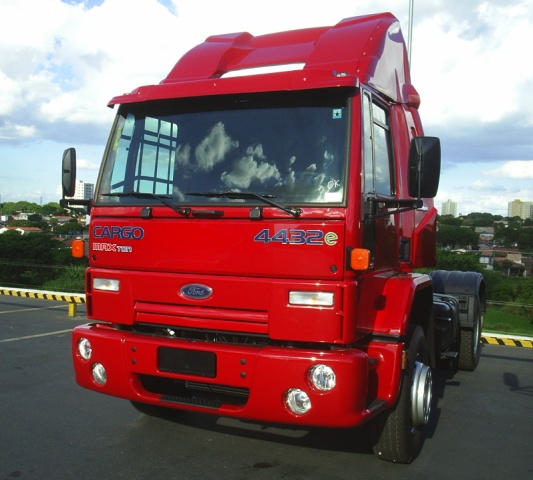
Ford Cargo
