= Ford Corcel =

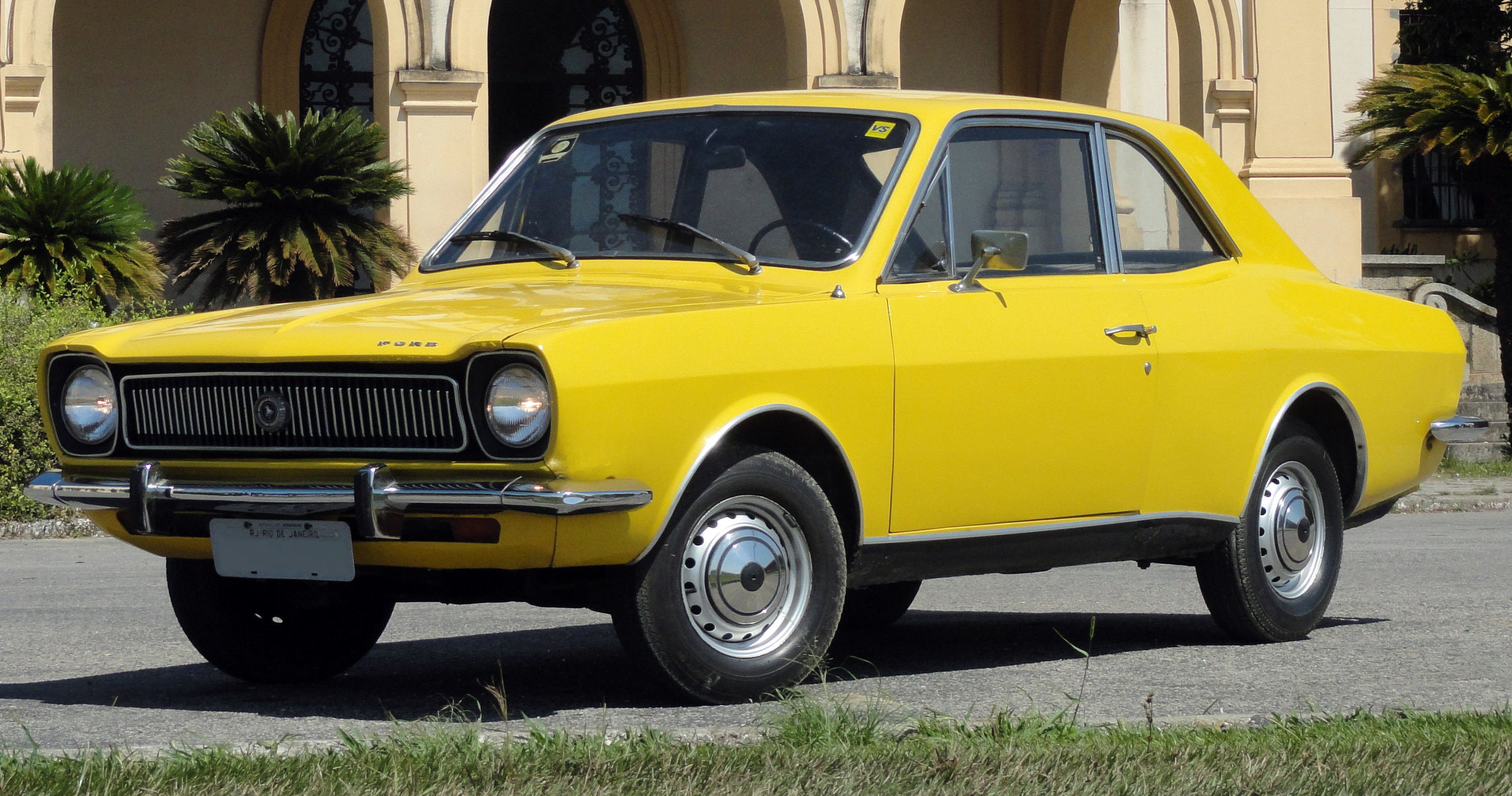
- 1973 Ford Corcel Coupé Luxo

Overview
- Manufacturer: Ford do Brasil
- Also called: Ford Belina (station wagon)
- Production: 1968–1986
- Assembly: Brazil: São Bernardo do Campo; Venezuela: Valencia (Corcel II)

Body and chassis
- Class: Large family car (D)
- Related: Ford Del Rey; Ford Pampa; Renault 12

The Ford Corcel ("charger" or "steed" in Portuguese) is a family car which was sold by Ford do Brasil in Brazil, Chile, Uruguay, Paraguay and Venezuela. It was also assembled in Venezuela (along with the upscale Del Rey derivative). The French-influenced styling of the Corcel was unique to Brazil until late 1977. From this year, the redesigned Corcel II (as it was originally sold) bore a strong resemblance to the European Ford Escort and Ford Cortina of same era, but its Renault underpinnings remained the same. The Corcel was eventually replaced by the Del Rey, which was originally introduced as a better equipped version of the Corcel.

== Origins ==
The Corcel's origins lay in the Renault 12. Willys-Overland's Brazilian operations included manufacturing the Renault Dauphine as the Willys Dauphine/Gordini/1093/Teimoso. Plans were underway to replace this outmoded range with a new car based on the upcoming Renault 12, internally referred to as "Project M". When Willys do Brasil was bought by Ford do Brasil in 1967, Ford inherited the project, meaning that the Corcel was actually presented nearly two years before the Renault 12.

== Corcel I ==
Ford Corcel (first generation)
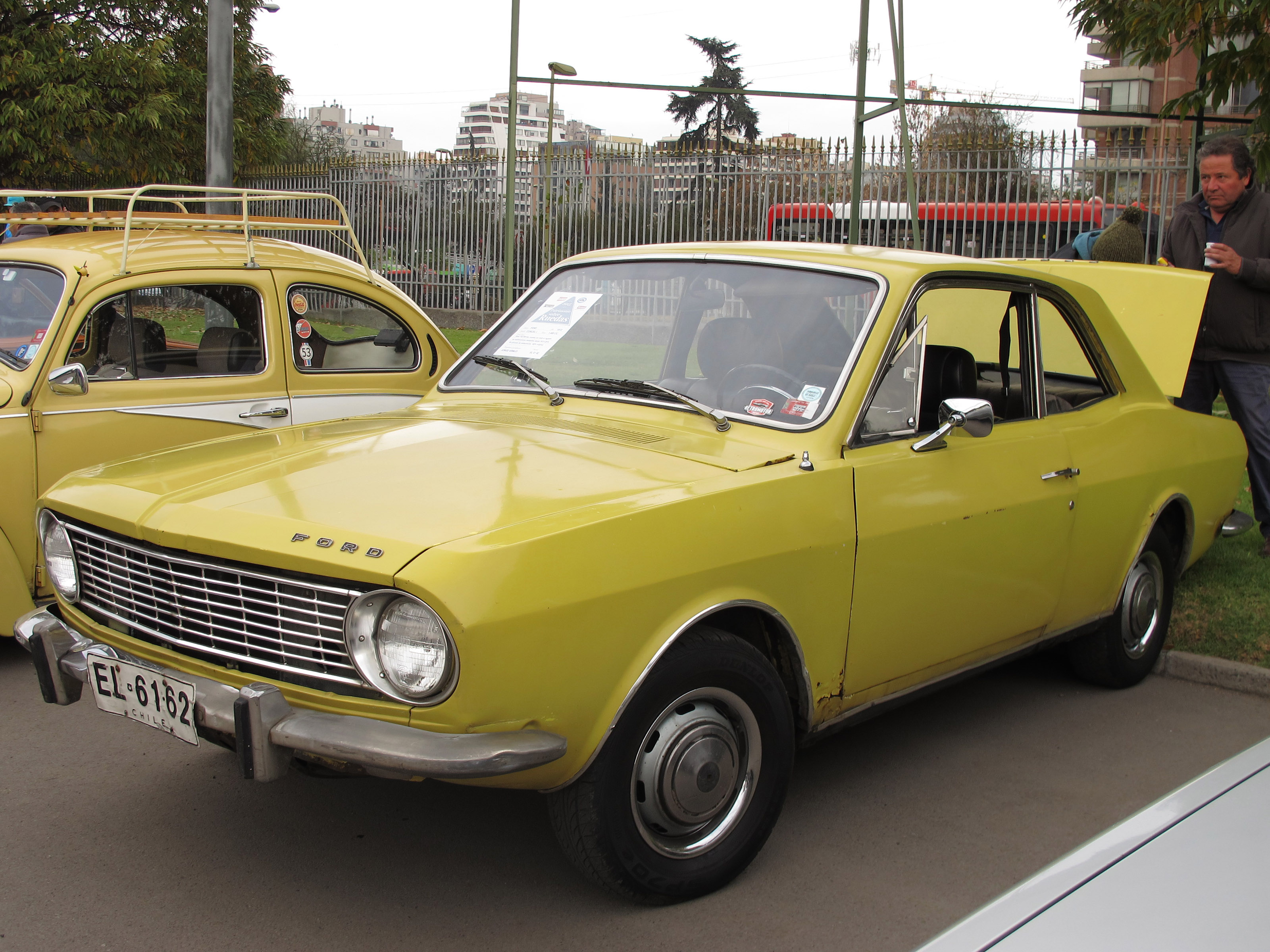
- Ford Corcel Luxo (1972)

Overview
- Manufacturer: Ford
- Also called: Ford Belina
- Production: 1968–1977

Body and chassis
- Body style: 2-door coupé; 4-door sedan; 3-door wagon
- Layout: Front-engine, front-wheel-drive layout
- Related: Renault 12

Powertrain
- Engine: 1289 cc Renault 810 OHV I4; 1372 cc 1300-B OHV I4; 1372 cc XP OHV I4 (GT)
- Transmission: 4-speed manual

Dimensions
- Wheelbase: 2,440 mm (96.1 in)
- Length: 4,390–4,410 mm (172.8–173.6 in)
- Width: 1,610 mm (63.4 in)
- Height: 1,370–1,430 mm (53.9–56.3 in)
- Curb weight: 920–1,005 kg (2,028–2,216 lb)

The first year of production of the Brazilian Ford Corcel was 1968, when it debuted as a four-door sedan at São Paulo. It was originally equipped with the 1.3 L (1,289 cc) 68 hp (51 kW) water-cooled overhead-valve "Cléon" engine picked directly from the Renault 12, albeit with a slightly lower compression ratio of 8:1 to allow it to run on 70 octane gasoline. A coupé was added in 1969 to target the second-car market, quickly becoming the fastest-selling version, followed by a three-door station wagon version called "Belina" in March 1970.

The early Corcels had severe quality issues and sales suffered accordingly, but after Ford do Brasil received a new head (Joseph W. O'Neill) in 1970 the decision was made to ameliorate the situation. In Brazil's first automotive recall, 65,000 owners were contacted and free repairs were made available; the Corcel once again became Ford's biggest selling model in 1971. In 1971 two new models appeared, with the L (for "Luxo") and the more powerful GT version added. The GT benefitted from a twin-barrel carburettor ("1300-C") and offered 80 hp (60 kW) and could reach 141 km/h (88 mph) rather than the 135 km/h (84 mph) of the regular versions. Each passing year running styling changes were made, borrowing several details from the Ford Maverick, and becoming more and more like a pony car in appearance. The GT was updated in the form of new decals every year, and eventually also got a larger, more powerful engine.

=== Facelift 1973 ===
The facelifted Corcel I (sometimes called the "Mark 1½") arrived in 1973 and had a more aggressive look compared to the more conservative 1968 version. Some of the L and all GT versions were also equipped with a new, bored out 1.4-litre (1372 cc) version of the existing engine. Claimed power for the regular Corcel was 75 hp (56 kW) (SAE gross), with 85 hp (63 kW) on tap at 5400 rpm from the "XP" engine used in the GT, with its double-barrel carburettor. With the later SAE net ratings, these figures became 72 hp (54 kW) and 77 hp (57 kW).

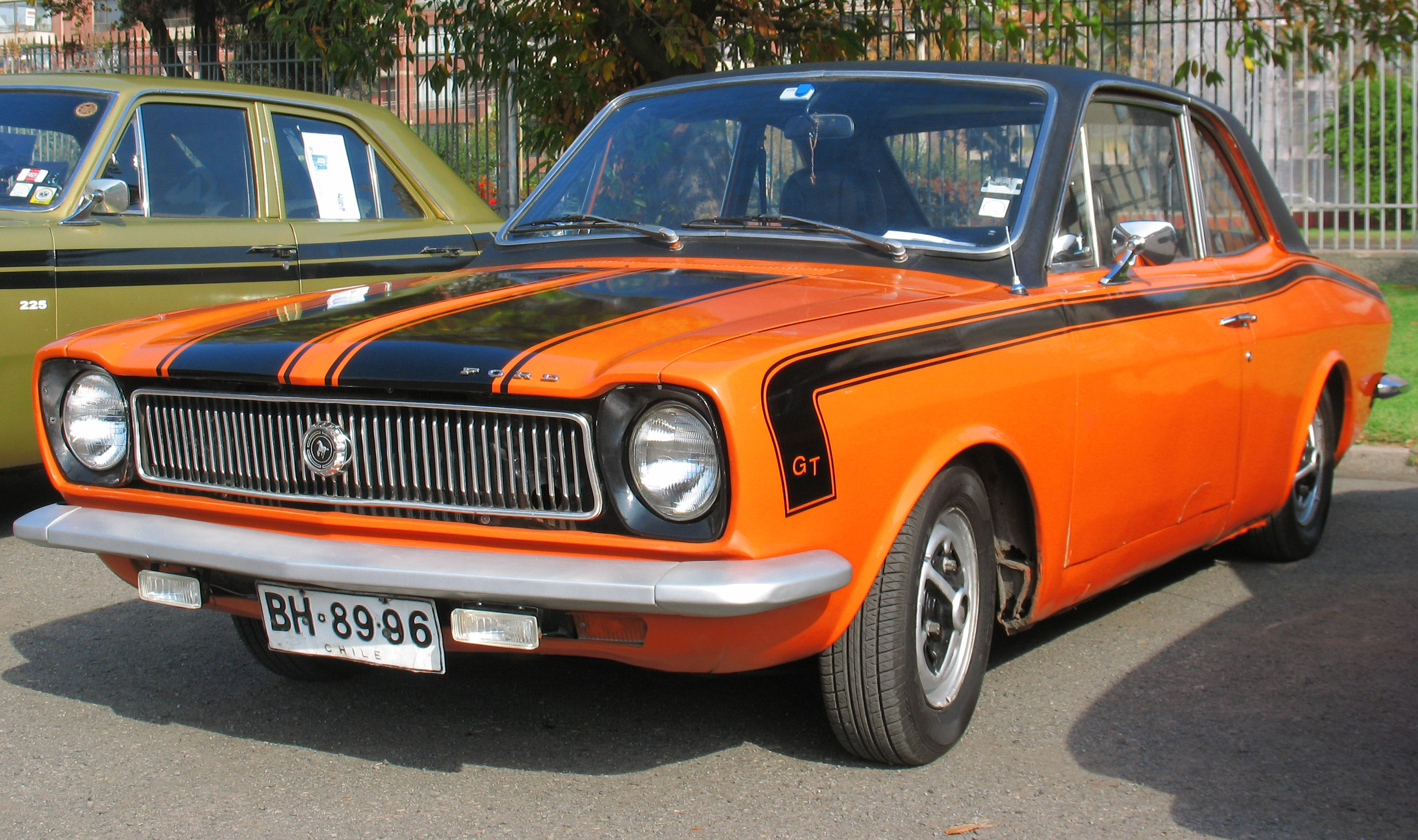
Ford Corcel GT Coupé (1974)

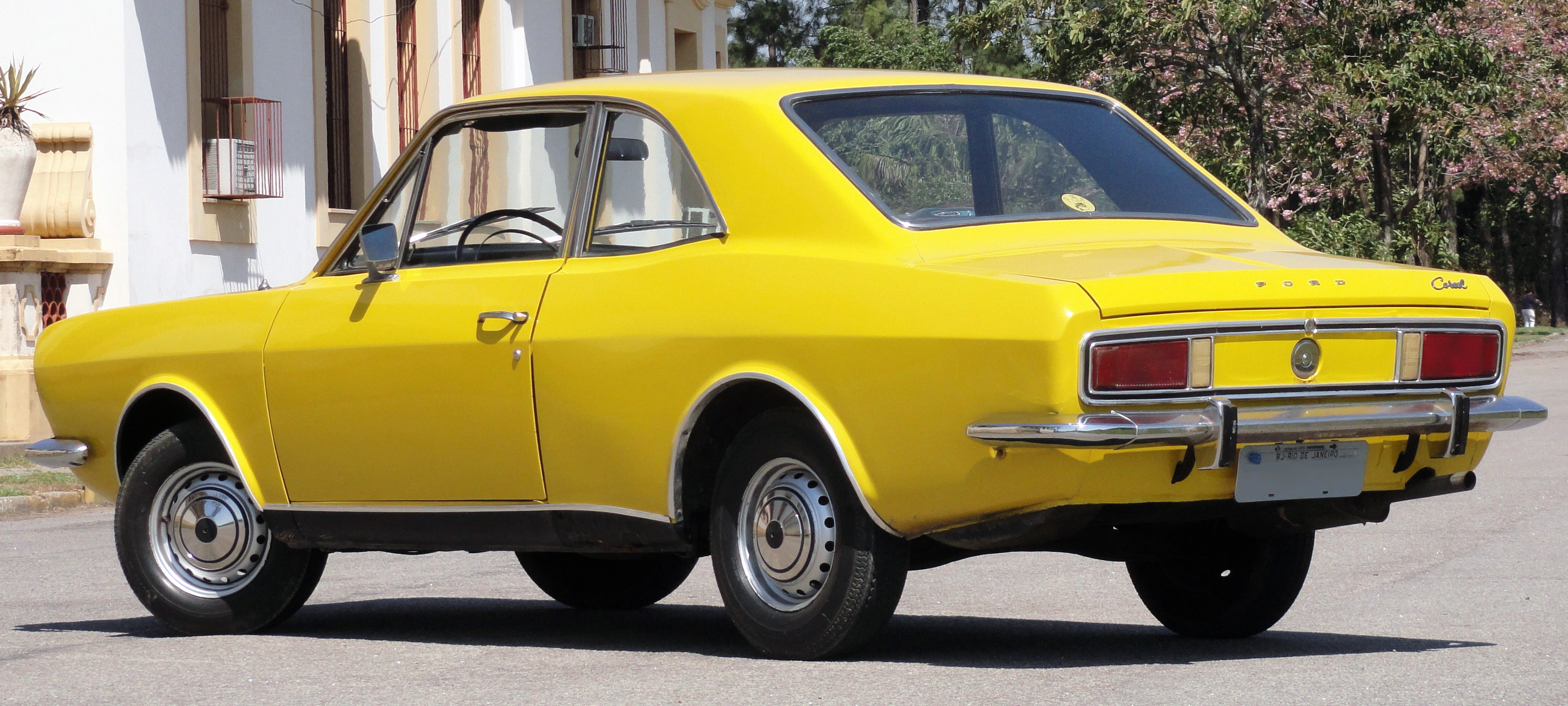
Ford Corcel Coupé Luxo (1973, rear)

=== Facelift 1975 ===
In 1975 a minor facelift occurred, in which the grille and headlight surrounds were subtly changed and the Ford logo moved from the grille onto the leading edge of the bonnet, along with the existing "F O R D" script. The taillights were now single-piece units. Also new for 1975 was the luxurious "LDO" version, available as a coupé or estate. Meanwhile, the locally developed 1.4 gradually replaced the old 1.3 throughout the lineup. This was very easy to modify for greater power and some dealers had the option to install an unofficial small tuning kit that would improve the engine's horsepower to 95 (SAE Gross). Note that all of these power outputs were achieved using the low quality, low octane petrol available in South America at the time.

The Corcel GT was moderately successful in Brazilian Tarumã, Interlagos and beach rally street car championships during the 1970s, thanks to its front-wheel-drive stability and low weight (920 kg), which allowed a high power-to-weight ratio. It would not be faster than the V-8 Maverick and Chevrolet Opala, but it would beat everything else in the Brazilian market, including four- and six-cylinder Mavericks and some Dodge Chargers that partook of the events. These competitions uncovered that the front drive universal joint was prone to break under heavy stress, so in 1976 the Corcel line switched to constant-velocity joints.

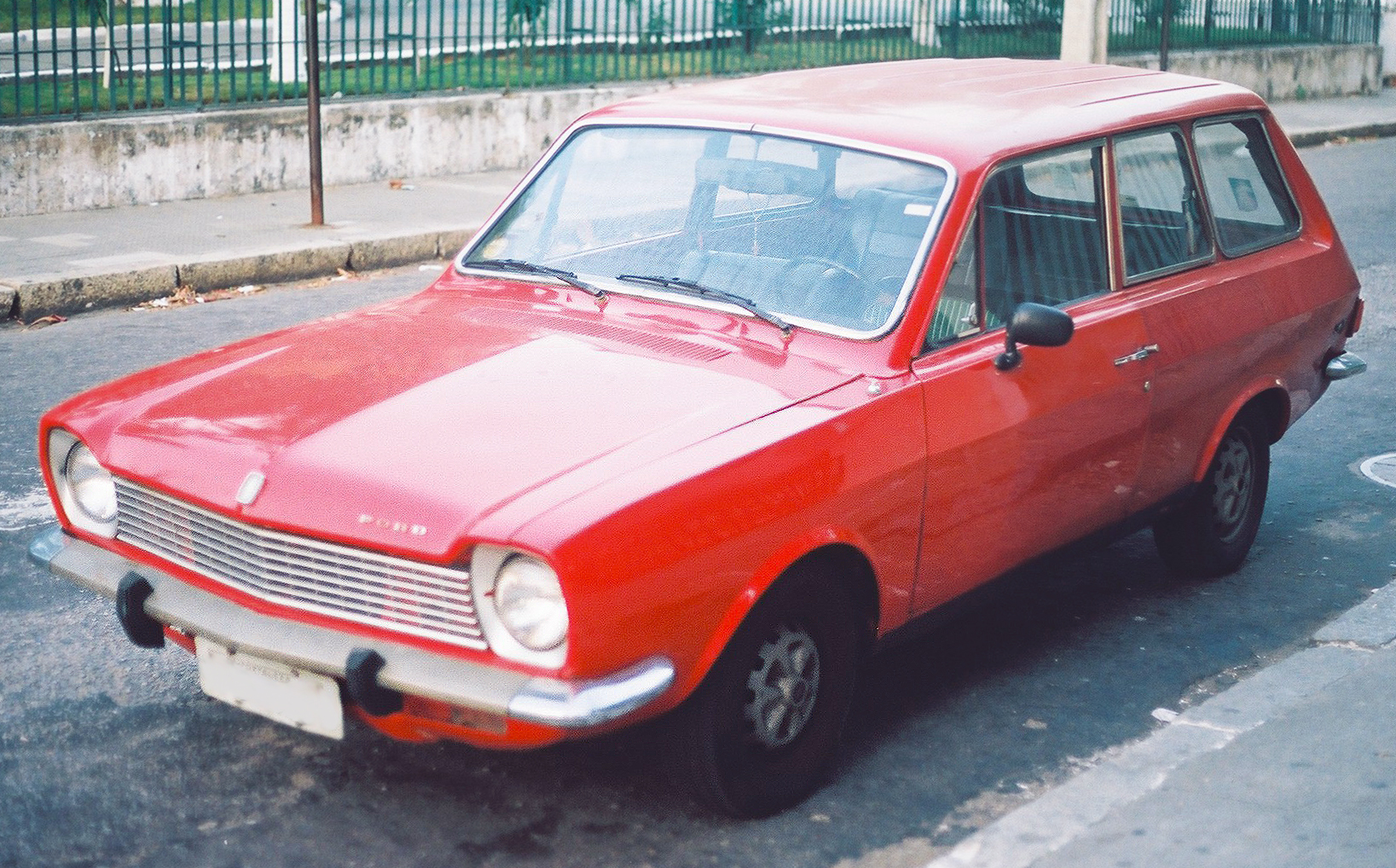
Ford Belina wagon (1975-1977)

== Corcel II ==
Ford Corcel II
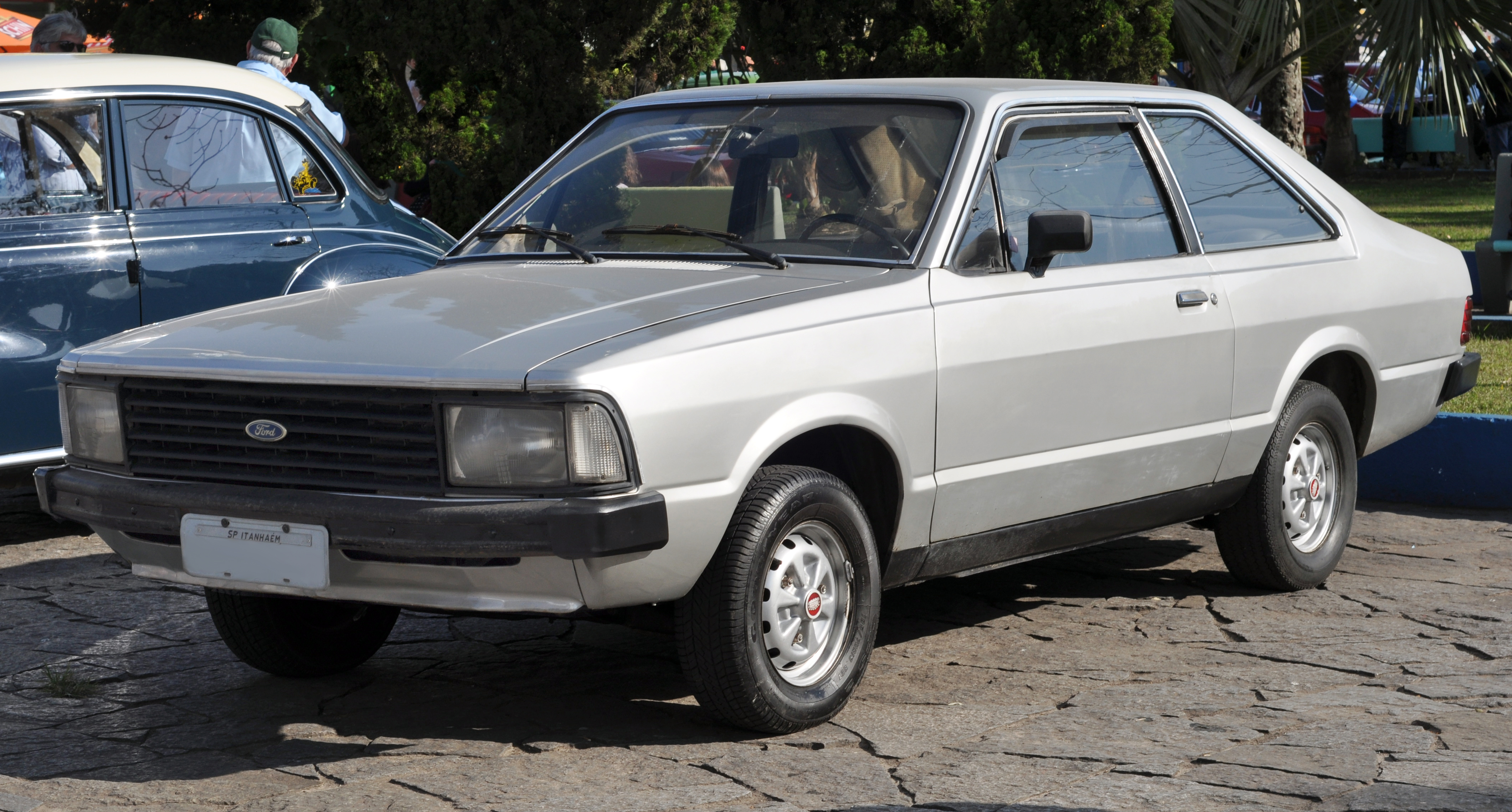

Overview
- Manufacturer: Ford
- Also called: Ford Belina
- Production: 1977–1986

Body and chassis
- Body style: 2-door fastback sedan; 3-door wagon
- Layout: Front-engine, front-wheel-drive layout; Front-engine, four-wheel-drive layout
- Related: Ford Del Rey; Ford Pampa; Renault 12

Powertrain
- Engine: 1372 cc 1300-B OHV I4; 1555 cc CHT OHV I4; 1781 cc Volkswagen AP-1800 I4
- Transmission: 4/5-speed manual

Dimensions
- Wheelbase: 2,440 mm (96.1 in)
- Length: 4,470–4,520 mm (176.0–178.0 in)
- Width: 1,660 mm (65.4 in)
- Height: 1,350–1,360 mm (53.1–53.5 in)
- Curb weight: 862–917 kg (1,900–2,022 lb)

Chronology
- Successor: Ford Del Rey

In 1977, for the 1978 model year, Ford launched the Corcel II. The second generation had a completely remade design and straight lines as opposed to the pony car style of the original Corcel. These changes were also applied to the Belina, while the four-door version was dropped in response to lack of consumer interest. The resulting two-door sedan was of a fastback style, with long and heavy doors.

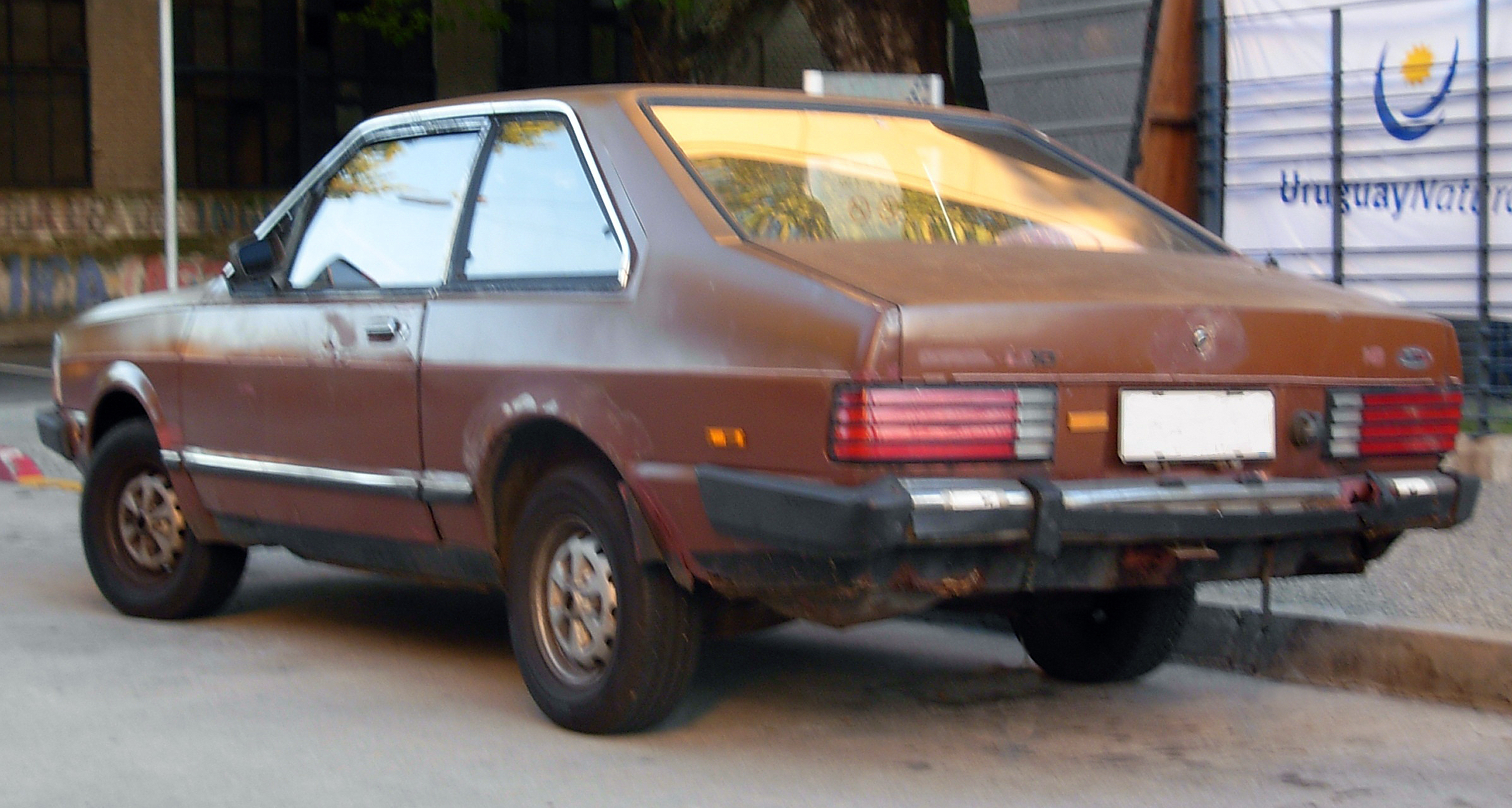
Rear view of Corcel II, showing fastback rear styling

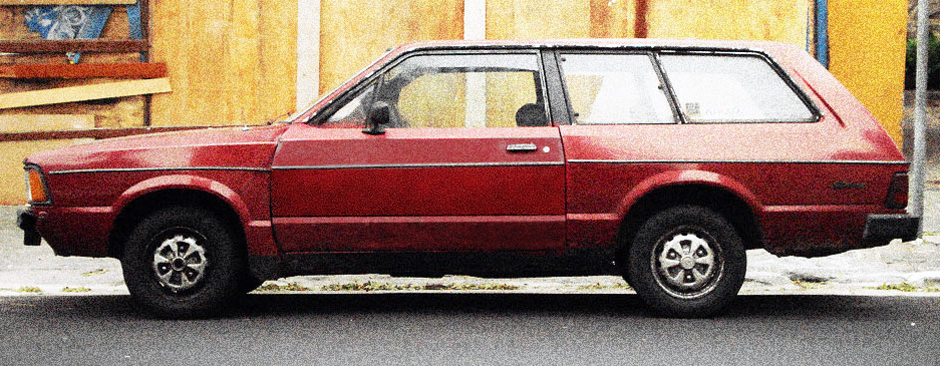
Ford Belina station wagon

Originally equipped with the same 1.4-litre four as the first Corcel, the engine was now rated at 54 hp (40 kW) DIN for the base, Luxo, and LDO versions. The somewhat sporting GT received 57 hp (42 kW), courtesy of a twin-barrel Solex carburettor. The Corcel II was also used for an FIA Group 1 one-marque championship in Brazil, in the years of 1979 to 1983.

The Ford Del Rey was introduced in 1981, with a more upright roofline and available four-door bodywork. The Del Rey also had a reworked, more square front design. A station wagon version of the Del Rey (called the Ford Scala until 1986) differed from the Belina only in trim and in the front design. The traditional Ford name Victoria was to be used on this version but was dropped at the last minute. The Ford Corcel II also provided the basis for a pick-up version called the Ford Pampa in 1982, although this used the shorter front doors of the four-door Ford Del Rey since there was no need to access the back seat. The Pampa would eventually also be available with four-wheel drive.

As of 1982, the engine was a CHT, an improved version of the "Cléon" engine used in the first Corcel of 1968. It had already been bored and stroked to 1555 cc years earlier, but with a redesigned cylinder head, a rotating valve design and many other peripheral improvements it received a new name and a new lease on life. On 30 October 1981, Venezuelan assembly of the Corcel II commenced. In 1986, Ford Motor de Venezuela produced 2244 Corcel IIs and 2439 Corcel Ghias (all two-door sedans), although by then, it was concentrating on production of the European-sourced Ford Sierra.

=== Facelift ===
All had a slight face lift for the 1985 model year. The Corcel II became known again simply as the Corcel. The interior was now the same for all four models. Externally, the Corcel and the Del Rey differed at the rear; the Corcel received fastback-style bodywork while the Del Rey was of a more traditional sedan design. The Belina and the Scala, however, had by now lost nearly all of their interior/exterior differences and became near identical: only a few details, such as the taillamps, differentiated these two models. Between 1985 and 1987 the Belina was made available with the same four-wheel-drive system used in the Pampa. This system seemed to have questionable reliability; Quatro Rodas magazine did a long-term test of a Belina 4x4 (50,000 km) in which breakdowns were very frequent - the resulting bad reputation led to Belina 4x4 production ending after only a few model years, while the Pampa 4x4 continued to be available.

1986 was the last year for the Corcel. The Belina was also discontinued in 1986, but its name was from then on applied to what had been the Scala (a name that had never really caught on) as the "Del Rey Belina". In 1989, as a result of the Autolatina joint-venture, the higher output Volkswagen AP-1800 engine replaced the 1.6-litre unit in all models of the Del Rey and Belina, and was made available in all models of the Pampa except for the ones with four-wheel drive.

The Del Rey and the "new" Belina were discontinued in 1991, being replaced by the Volkswagen Santana-derived Ford Versailles and Royale respectively. The Pampa continued to be sold on until 1997, when Ford introduced the smaller, Fiesta-based Ford Courier a year later.
