= Ford CHT engine =

Inline four-cylinder automobile engine

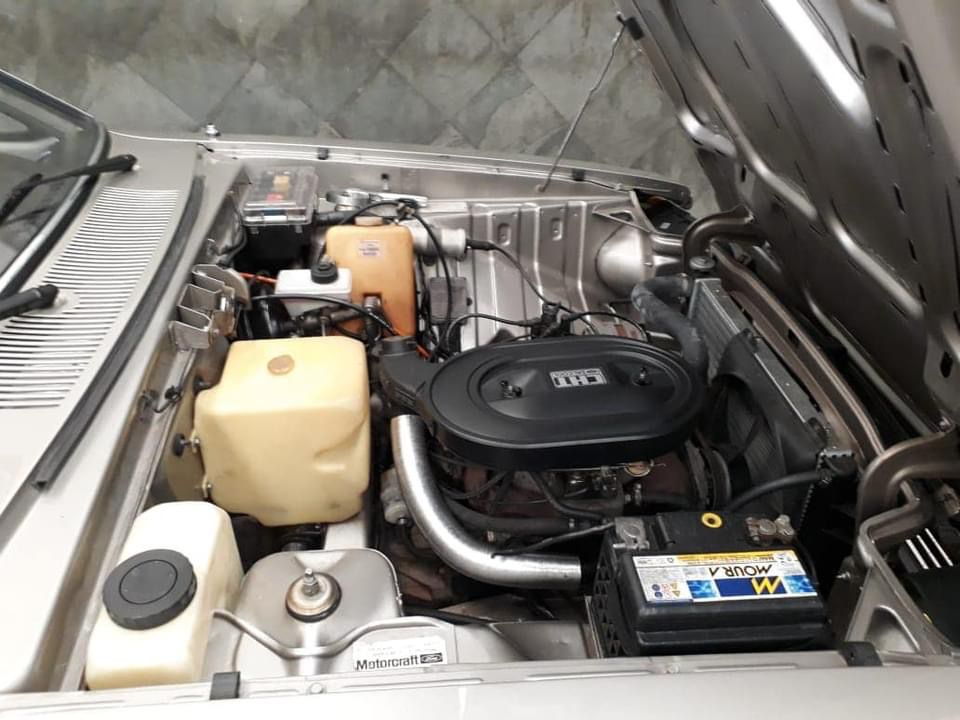
- Ford CHT engine in 1986 Ford Belina

Overview
- Manufacturer: Ford Motor Company
- Also called: AutoLatina AE
- Production: 1983–1997

Layout
- Configuration: Naturally aspirated I4
- Displacement: 997 cc (60.8 cu in); 1,341 cc (81.8 cu in); 1,555 cc (94.9 cu in)
- Cylinder bore: 70.3 mm (2.77 in); 71.5 mm (2.81 in); 77 mm (3.03 in)
- Piston stroke: 64.2 mm (2.53 in); 83.5 mm (3.29 in)
- Cylinder block material: Cast iron
- Cylinder head material: Aluminum
- Valvetrain: OHV 2 valves x cyl.

Combustion
- Fuel system: One 2-bbl carburetor; Single-point fuel injection
- Fuel type: Gasoline; Ethanol
- Oil system: Wet sump
- Cooling system: Water-cooled

Output
- Power output: 37–62.9 kW (50–84 hp)

Chronology
- Predecessor: Renault Cléon-Fonte
- Successor: Ford Endura-E; Ford Zetec RoCam

The Ford CHT engine is an inline four-cylinder internal combustion engine family produced by the Ford Motor Company in Brazil during the 1980s and 1990s. It was derived from the Renault Cléon-Fonte engine. It is unrelated to the similarly-named Ford CVH engine.

== Ford Cléon-Fonte ==
Ford do Brasil acquired manufacturing rights for the Cléon-Fonte engine when they took over Willys' Brazilian operation in the late 1960s. The engine was part of the Renault-based "Projeto M" (Project M) joint venture between Willys do Brasil and Renault. The Cléon-Fonte has a wet linered cast iron block with five main bearings, an aluminum cylinder head, and a single, high-mounted cam-in-block that drives two overhead valves per cylinder via short pushrods and rocker arms, all features retained in the CHT.

Projeto M came to market as the Ford Corcel in 1968. The Cléon-Fonte in early cars displaced 1.3 L. Ford later raised this to 1.4 L by increasing the bore diameter, creating the "1300-B" when fitted with a single barrel carburetor, or the "1300-C" and later "XP" when fitted with a two barrel carburetor. Ford enlarged the Cléon-Fonte's dimensions again in 1979, resulting in a displacement of 1.6 L.

== Redesign ==
In mid-1981, Ford do Brasil began "Projeto Zeta", to adapt the new MkIII series front-wheel-drive (FWD) Ford Escort to the Brazilian market. When the car debuted in August 1983, one of the biggest changes was the substitution of a Brazilian-developed engine for the CVH engine used in other markets. Ford do Brasil had argued for the change, saying that a revised Cléon-Forte would be more economical and easier for the Brazilian engineers to convert to run on ethanol.

The design effort for the new engine was led by Luc de Ferran. While considered a Brazilian design, it is reported that Ford of Europe had some input to the work, and that Renault was consulted. Ford began with their largest Cléon-Fonte block, whose 77 mm × 83.5 mm (3.03 in × 3.29 in) bore and stroke gave a displacement of 1,555 cc (94.9 cu in). They also created a smaller 1,341 cc (81.8 cu in) version with a 71.5 mm (2.81 in) bore.

The goal of the redesign was to improve combustion efficiency by swirling the intake charge entering the combustion chambers. Ford had their engineers design a new cylinder head for the Cléon-Fonte block, and renamed the resulting engine the CHT, which stands for Compound High Turbulence. Changes were also made to the intake and exhaust manifolds, valve timing and compression ratio.

The CHT became known as a smooth running engine with good performance at low engine speeds, but as an OHV design it suffered in comparison to the contemporary SOHC Volkswagen EA827 engine, while also producing less power. The engine earned a reputation for simplicity and toughness, and for producing good torque at low speeds, making it suitable for most common driving conditions.

== Production use ==
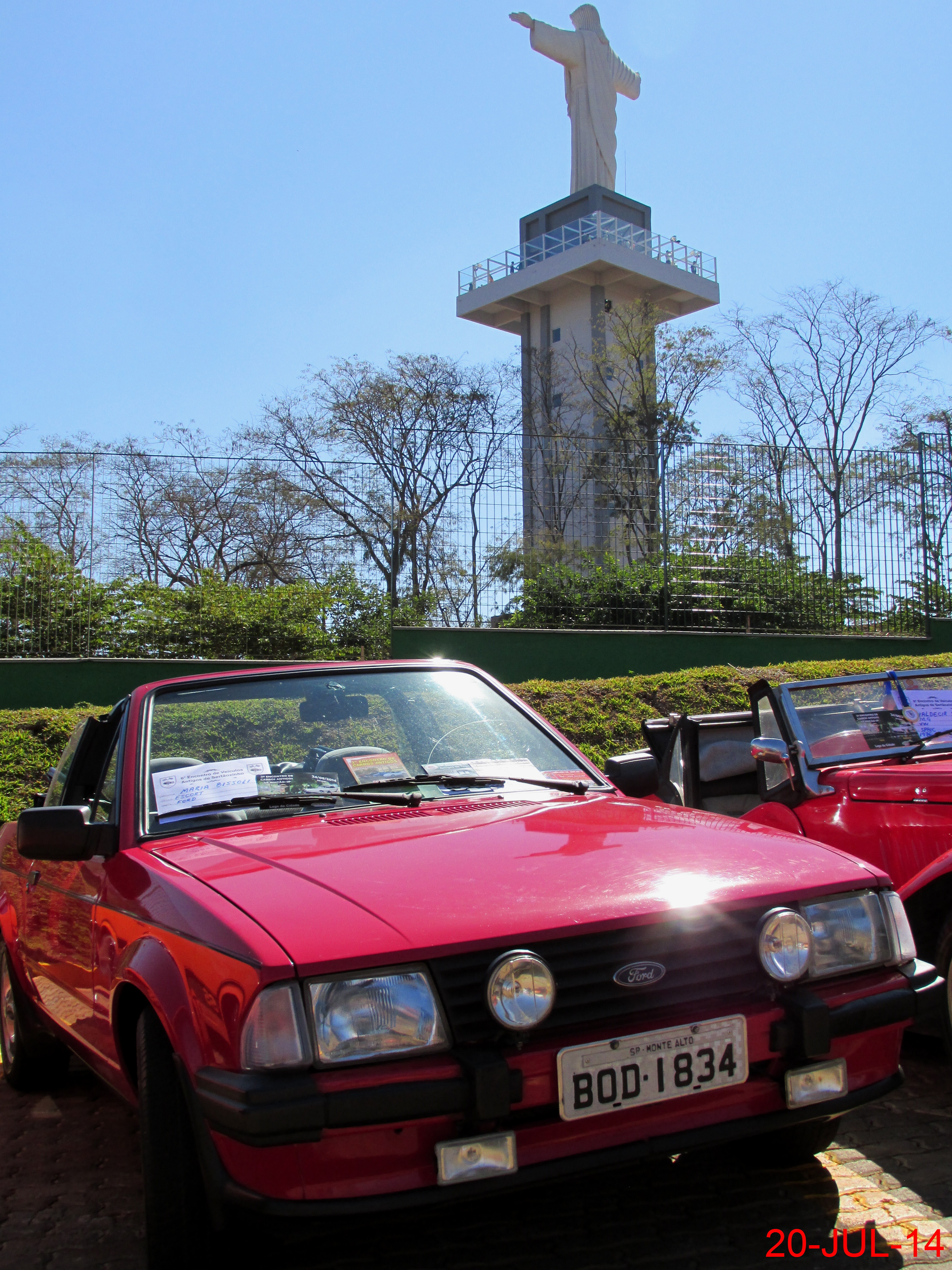
MkIII Escort cabriolet in Brazil

The CHT was introduced in 1983 in the Brazilian MkIII Escort, the first of the Escort series released in Brazil. The highest output ethanol engines were reserved for the Escort XR3. Ford also used the CHT in other new car lines, or substituted it for the Cléon-Fonte in existing lines, including the Corcel II sedan and related Belina II wagon, Del Rey two- and four-door sedans and Del Rey Belina wagon, first generation Verona two-door sedan, and Pampa coupé utility.

In March 1992, spurred by changes to vehicle taxation laws, a smaller version was released, with a 70.3 mm × 64.2 mm (2.77 in × 2.53 in) bore and stroke and displacement of 997 cc (60.8 cu in). It was used in the Escort Hobby.

After 1996, the CHT was first replaced by the Kent Endura-E engine, then by the 1.0 L and 1.6 L Zetec RoCam from 2000 onward.

== Versions ==
Initially available in 1.35 L or 1.6 L displacements, the CHT was also offered in both gasoline and ethanol fuel versions. Two different levels of engine tune were developed; the regular CHT engine, and the CHT E-MÁX ("Economia Maximizada" — maximised economy) that was optimized for fuel efficiency. A CHT E-MÁX engine received an award for most economical engine of its time in Brazil, returning 17.1 km/L (48 mpg_{‑imp}; 40 mpg_{‑US}) on gasoline.

Early in the project, up to seven versions of the engine were under development. Variants included regular and high-compression gasoline engines in 1.35 L and 1.6 L sizes, ethanol fueled engines in 1.35 L and 1.6 L sizes, and a high-performance ethanol engine:

- 1341 cc CHT E-MÁX, gasoline, 9.0:1 Compression ratio (CR), 41.7 kW (56.7 hp) at 5000 rpm, 96.8 N⋅m (71 lb⋅ft)
- 1341 cc CHT E-MÁX, gasoline, 9.5:1 CR, 42.4 kW (57.6 hp) at 5000 rpm, 99.3 N⋅m (73 lb⋅ft)
- 1341 cc CHT E-MÁX, ethanol, 12.0:1 CR, 46.2 kW (62.8 hp) at 5000 rpm, 103.3 N⋅m (76 lb⋅ft)
- 1555 cc CHT, gasoline, 9.0:1 CR, 47.9 kW (65.1 hp) at 4800 rpm, 105.9 N⋅m (78 lb⋅ft)
- 1555 cc CHT, gasoline, 9.5:1 CR, 48.4 kW (65.8 hp) at 5400 rpm, 105.8 N⋅m (78 lb⋅ft)
- 1555 cc CHT, ethanol, 12.0:1 CR, 53.7 kW (73.0 hp) at 5200 rpm, 116.2 N⋅m (86 lb⋅ft)
- 1555 cc CHT, ethanol, 12.0:1 CR, — , —

In 1983, five versions were offered in the Ford Escort:

- 1341 cc CHT E-MÁX, gasoline, 9.0:1 CR, 41.7 kW (56.7 hp) at 5000 rpm, 96.8 N⋅m (71 lb⋅ft) at 2800 rpm
- 1341 cc CHT E-MÁX, ethanol, 12.0:1 CR, 46.2 kW (62.8 hp) at 5000 rpm, 103.3 N⋅m (76 lb⋅ft) at 2800 rpm
- 1555 cc CHT, gasoline, 9.0:1 CR, 47.9 kW (65.1 hp) at 4800 rpm, 105.9 N⋅m (78 lb⋅ft) at 2400 rpm
- 1555 cc CHT, ethanol, 12.0:1 CR, 53.7 kW (73.0 hp) at 5200 rpm, 116.2 N⋅m (86 lb⋅ft) at 3600 rpm
- 1555 cc CHT, ethanol, 12.0:1 CR, 61.0 kW (82.9 hp) at 5600 rpm, 124.0 N⋅m (91 lb⋅ft) at 4000 rpm

The engine was revised in 1987 with the release of the MkIV Ford Escort. New versions included a 1.6 L CHT E-MÁX. The 1988 Ford Escort offered one gasoline and two ethanol fueled options:

- 1555 cc CHT E-MÁX, gasoline, 9.0:1 CR, 54.9 kW (74.6 hp) at 5200 rpm, 123.6 N⋅m (91 lb⋅ft) at 2400 rpm
- 1555 cc CHT E-MÁX, ethanol, 12.0:1 CR, 55.9 kW (76.0 hp) at 5000 rpm, 129.6 N⋅m (96 lb⋅ft) at 2400 rpm
- 1555 cc CHT E-MÁX, ethanol, 12.0:1 CR, 62.9 kW (85.5 hp) at 5600 rpm, 126.3 N⋅m (93 lb⋅ft) at 4000 rpm

Ford only used the 1.0 L CHT in the Escort Hobby:

- 997 cc gasoline 37 kW (50.3 hp) at 5800 rpm, 72 N⋅m (53 lb⋅ft) at 3600 rpm

== Volkswagen ==
From 1987 to 1996, Ford and Volkswagen in Brazil operated as a joint venture under the name AutoLatina. During this time, the CHT was renamed the AE engine, for Alta Economia (High Economy). Volkswagen began selling rebadged Ford models, some of which carried forward the 1.6 L CHT, now called the AE-1600, and some of which did not. The Volkswagen Apollo coupé, a rebadged first generation Ford Verona, never offered the AE-1600. The Escort-based Volkswagen Logus two-door coupé was sold with an AE-1600 option, while the related first generation four-door Volkswagen Pointer was not.

The only line native to Volkswagen that adopted the AE engine was the Volkswagen Gol. VW offered the AE-1600 in the first generation Gol hatchbacks, Voyage sedan, Parati station wagon, and Saveiro coupé utility. VW also offered the 1.0 L AE-1000 in the hatchbacks after the laws changed to favor sub-1 L vehicles. The second generation Gol added single-point fuel injection, and was the last car to use the engine, until it was dropped after 1996. The AE-1000 was replaced by the EA111, and the AE-1600 by the EA827.
