= Ford Del Rey =

Midsized car produced by Ford do Brasil (1981–1991)

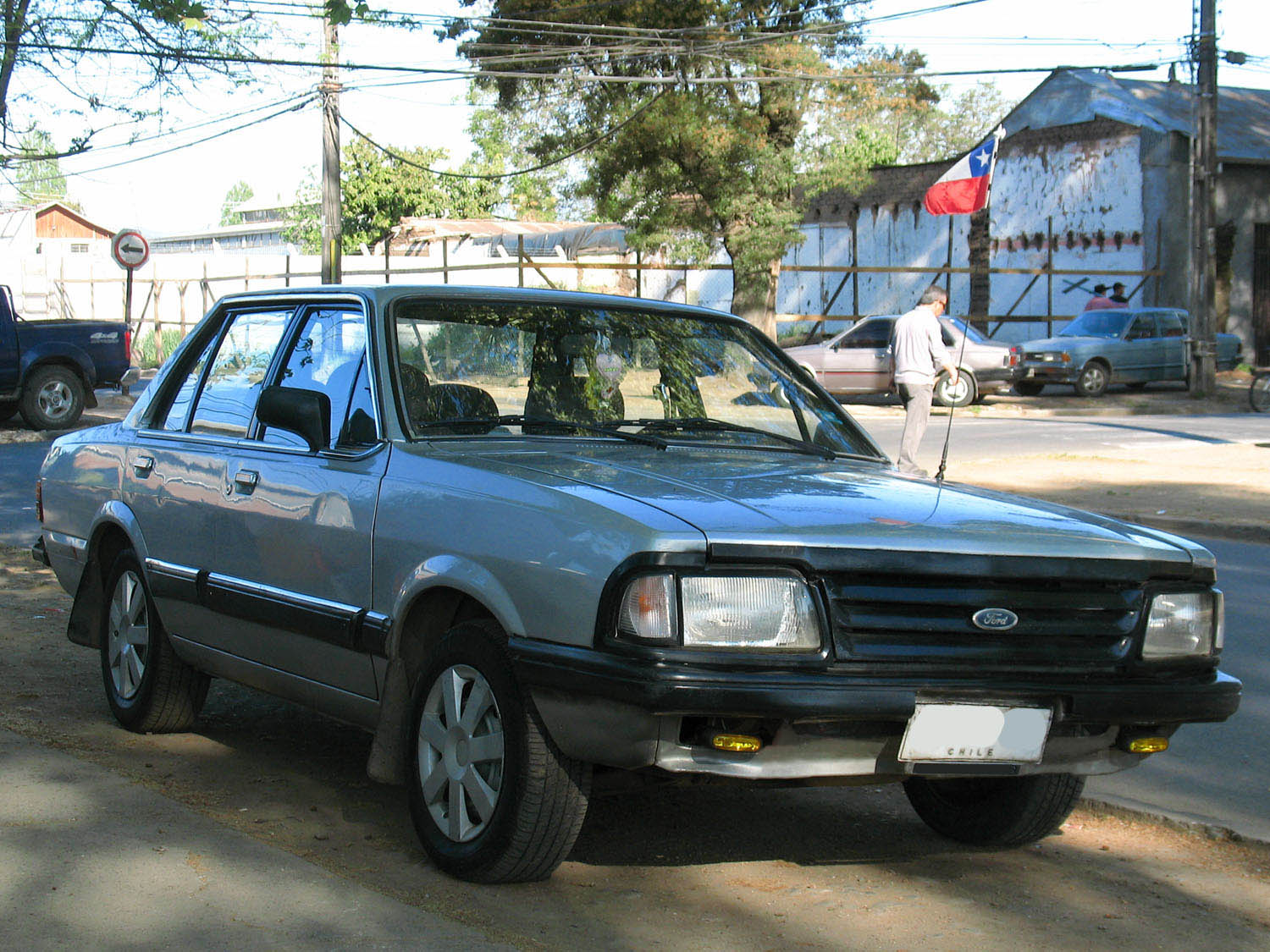
- 1989 Ford Del Rey Sedan (with aftermarket wheels)

Overview
- Manufacturer: Ford Brasil
- Production: 1981–1991
- Assembly: Brazil: São Bernardo do Campo

Body and chassis
- Class: Mid-size car / Large family car (D)
- Body style: 2-door coupé 4-door sedan 3-door station wagon

Powertrain
- Engine: 1555 cc Renault/Ford CHT I4; 1781 cc VW AP I4
- Transmission: 5-speed manual 3-speed automatic

Dimensions
- Length: 4,498 mm (177 in)
- Width: 1,676 mm (66 in)
- Height: 1,325 mm (52 in)
- Curb weight: 1,110 kg (2,447 lb)

Chronology
- Predecessor: Ford Corcel II
- Successor: Ford Versailles

The Ford Del Rey is a large family car produced by Ford do Brasil in Brazil from 1981 to 1991. It was a successor to the Ford Landau as the flagship model of the lineup and to the higher priced versions of the popular Ford Corcel II. Like the Corcel II, the Del Rey was designed exclusively for Brazil, but was sold in Chile, Venezuela, Uruguay, and Paraguay, as well.

The Del Rey was offered as a two-door coupé, four-door sedan, or three-door station wagon, named Scala until 1985, when it adopted the name Belina as used by Corcel. A two-door convertible prototype was also shown in 1982, but never entered production. The vehicle was offered in many models, originally as the Prata (silver) and Ouro (gold) as basic and top-of-the-line versions between 1981 and 1984. Between 1985 and 1991, the versions (from most basic to top) were L, GL, GLX, and Ghia. It was offered with two engines, a CHT 1.6-L inline four and a VW-developed 1.8-L inline four, both which were fueled by gasoline or ethanol. The transmissions were a standard five-speed manual and an optional three-speed automatic. The Del Rey was replaced by the Ford Versailles in 1991, which was based on the Volkswagen Santana, built in an association between Ford and VW called Autolatina.

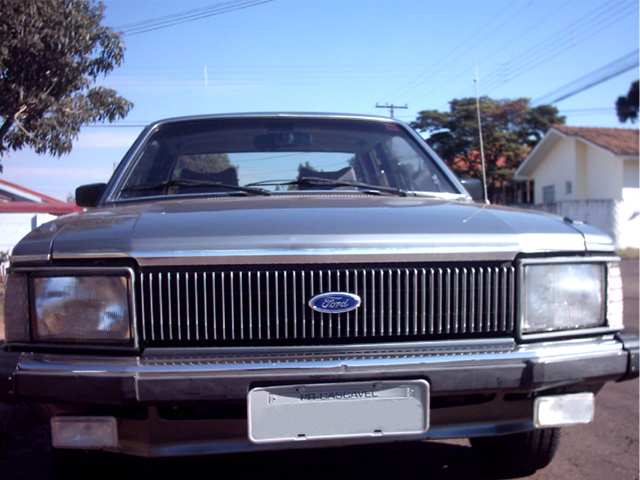
Pre-facelift front view

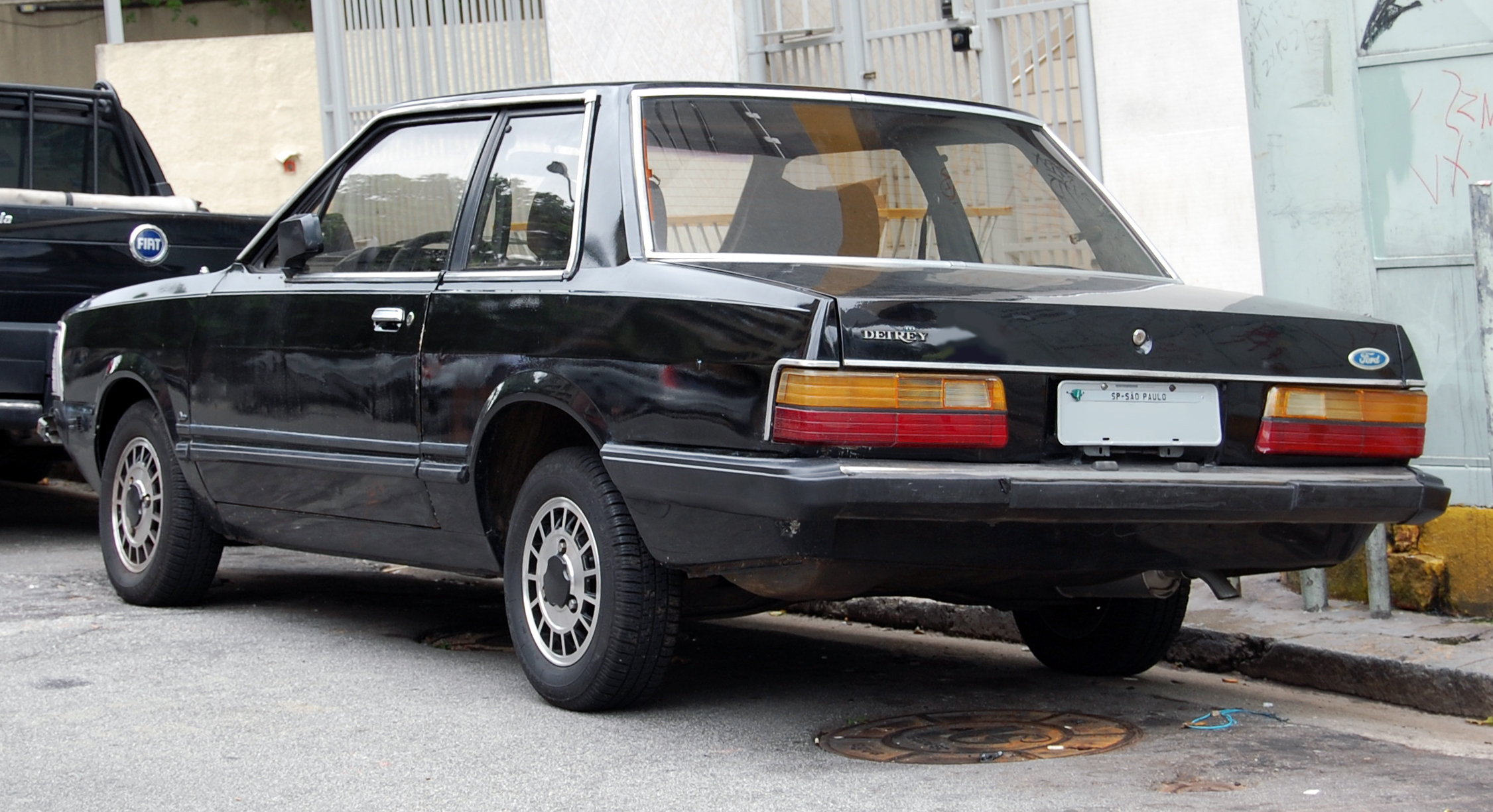
Ford Del Rey two-door sedan

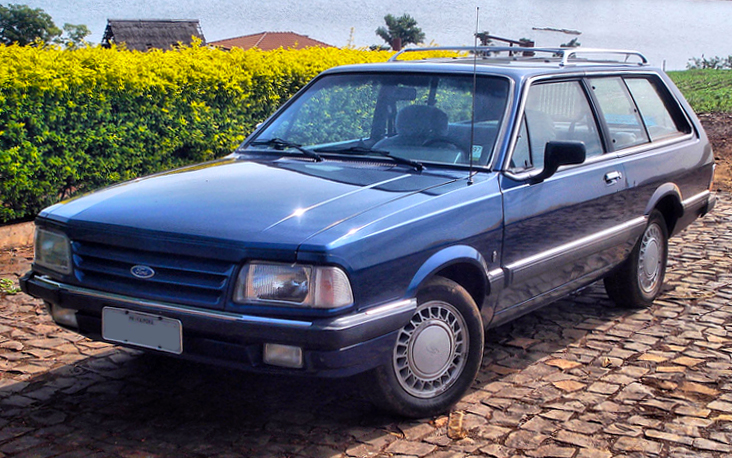
1990 Ford Belina Ghia, a station wagon Del Rey

Logotype
