= Ford Landau =

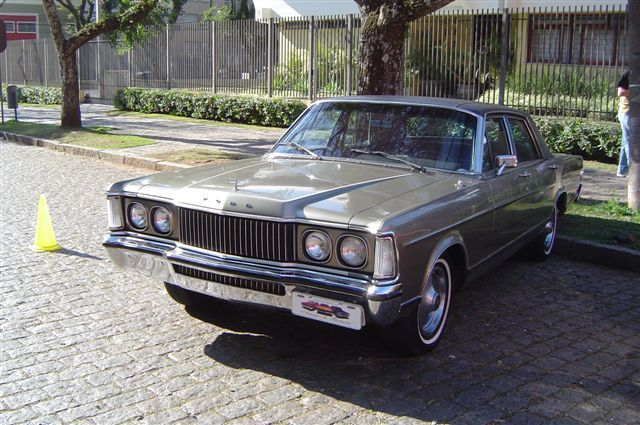

Overview
- Manufacturer: Ford Brasil
- Also called: Ford LTD Landau
- Production: 1971–1983
- Assembly: Brazil: Via Anchieta São Bernardo do Campo, São Paulo

Body and chassis
- Class: Full-size car
- Body style: 4-door sedan
- Layout: FR layout
- Related: Ford Galaxie

Powertrain
- Engine: 302 CID V8 Ford Windsor engine
- Transmission: 3-speed manual 3-speed automatic

Ford Landau is a full-size car, launched at the 1970 São Paulo Auto Show and manufactured in Brazil from 1971 until 1983 by Ford Brasil at their São Paulo, São Bernardo do Campo Via Anchieta facility. It became Ford's flagship in that country. It was based on the U.S. 1966 Ford Galaxie. It was only offered as a 4-door sedan, although the American version was offered in a wide variety of bodystyles. After 1976, it gained more differences from the Galaxie and LTD, and featured the newly introduced 302 engine, a lighter 5.0L V8, and its radical restyling clearly resembling the 1965 Lincoln Continental.

== American origin, Brazilian style ==
The Landau joined the existing models Galaxie 500 and LTD in the showrooms in 1976 as Ford's new top-of-the-range model. All three models featured the new 302 CID engine with 4942 cc and 198 hp (148 kW), which replaced the heavier 292, but the Galaxie and LTD kept their design elements from the American original.

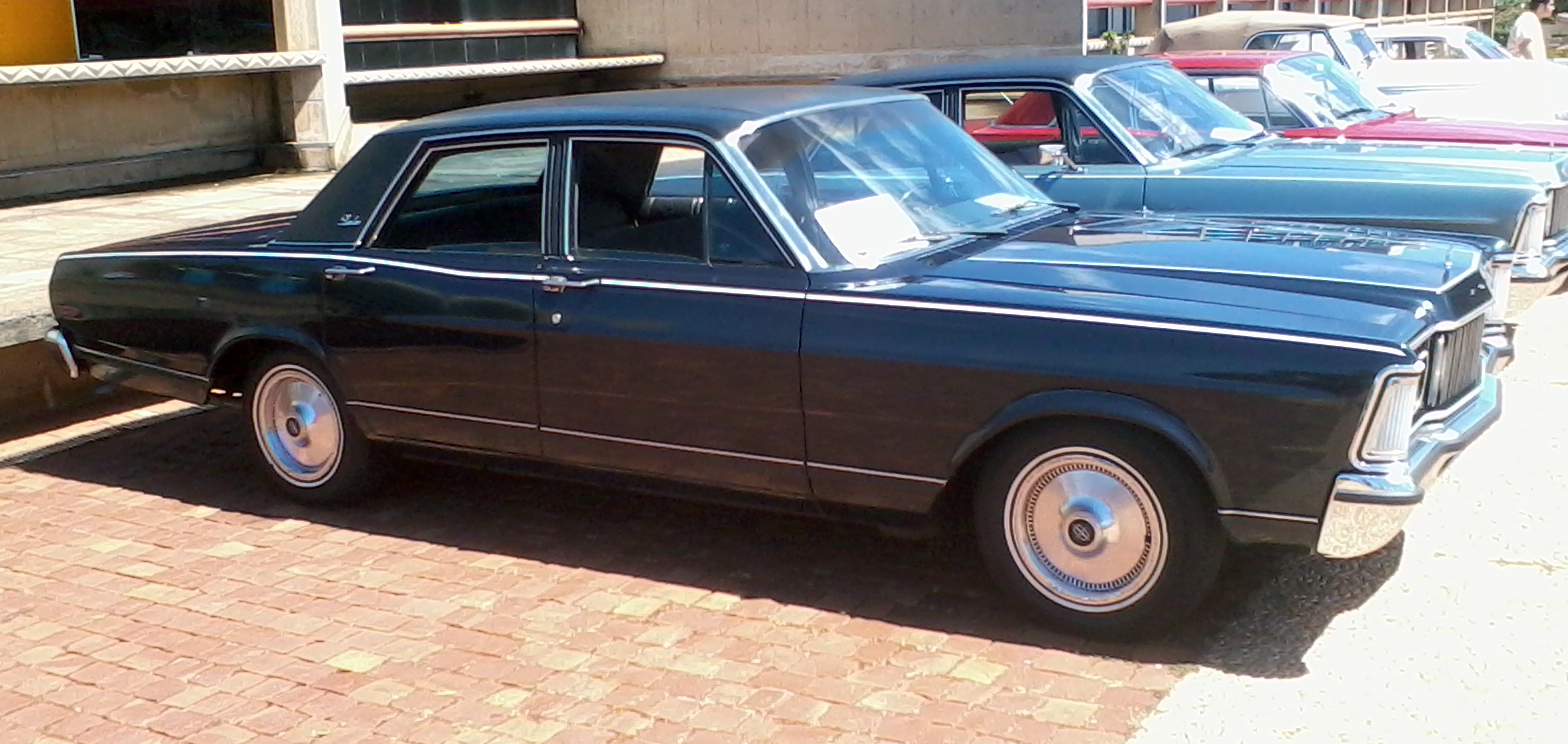
Ford Landau (side view)

Initially the Landau offered in the single colour scheme “Prata Continental” (Continental Silver), an exclusive metallic clearcoat. The vinyl roof was painted silver coloured too.

== Trivia ==
On June 25, 1979, during the oil crisis in Brazil, Ford includes in Galaxie/ Landau range an 302 CID engine with higher compression ratio (11,0:1 vs. 7,8:1), and that made use of true dual exhaust, aluminum intake manifold and nickel-covered carburetor, to accept the use of Ethanol (sugar cane alcohol). The first car was a present to the Brazilian president at the time, João Figueiredo.

From the total of 77,647 Galaxie versions built in Brazil in 16 years of market presence, 2492 units ran with alcohol as fuel.

=== Production figures ===
- 1971 – Unknown exactly.
- 1972 – Unknown exactly.
- 1973 – 3539.
- 1974 – 3720.
- 1975 – 2911.
- 1976 – 5556. Colour Silver, White And Black
- 1977 – 2422. Colour Silver, White And Black
- 1978 – 3903. Colour Blue Grey
- 1979 – 4412 gasoline; 22 ethanol. Colour Blue Grey, Burgundy Wine, Blue Navy
- 1980 – 1390 gasoline; 1581 ethanol. Colour Blue Navy
- 1981 – 538 gasoline; 587 ethanol. Colour Blue Navy
- 1982 – 929 gasoline; 270 ethanol. Colour Blue Navy, Grey Green
- 1983 – 93 gasoline; 32 ethanol. Colour Blue Navy, Grey Green

Until 1980, includes Ford LTD.
