= Ford Brasil =

Brazilian import subsidiary of the Ford Motor Company

Ford Motor Company Brasil Ltda.

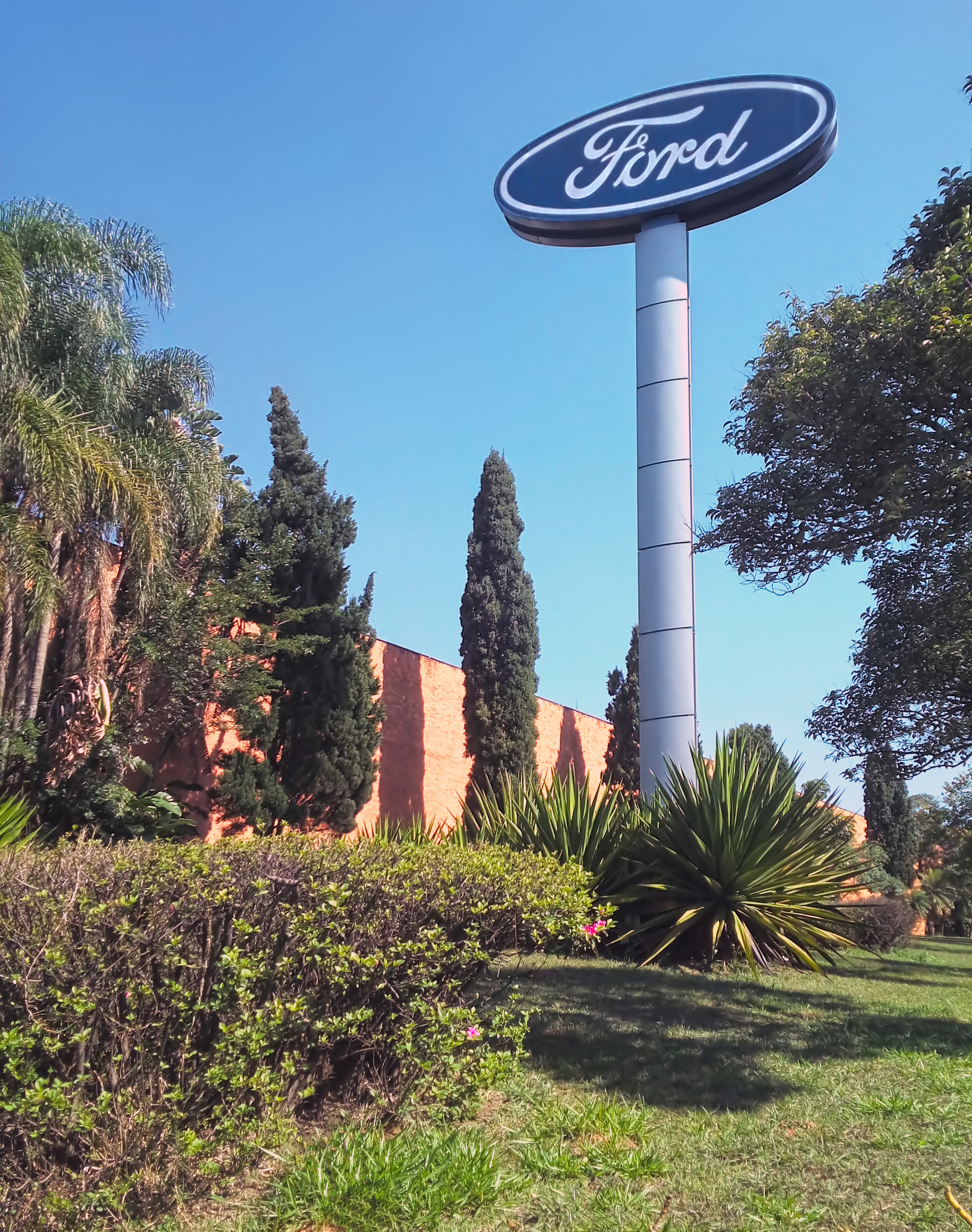
- Ford factory at São Bernardo do Campo
- Type: Subsidiary
- Industry: Automotive
- Founded: 1919; 107 years ago
- Founder: Henry Ford
- Defunct: 2021; 5 years ago (car factory)
- Headquarters: São Bernardo do Campo, São Paulo state, Brazil,
- Key people: Daniel Justo (president and CEO)
- Products: Cars, pickup trucks, commercial vehicles
- Revenue: ▼US$5.41 billion (2012)
- Number of employees: 6,171
- Parent: Ford Motor Company
- Subsidiaries: Troller (1995–2021)
- Website: ford.com.br

Ford Motor Company Brasil Ltda. is the Brazilian subsidiary of American automaker Ford Motor Company, founded on 24 April 1919. The operation started out importing the Ford Model T cars and the Ford Model TT trucks in kit form from the United States for assembly in Brazil. The Ford brand, however, had already been present in the country since 1904 with both vehicles being sold in Brazil.

== History ==
Initially operating in rented buildings, Ford opened its own plant in 1921 in São Paulo. Called Solon Plant, it was a scaled-down Highland Park Plant, also designed by Albert Kahn. Also, in 1928, a rubber plantation village was open in Pará to supply tires and other parts, called Fordlândia. This was abandoned in 1934.

=== 1950s – From assembling to manufacturing ===
In 1953 Ford opened a new and bigger plant in São Paulo, known as the Ipiranga Plant, geared for local production.

Ford inaugurated a full blown manufacturing operation on 26 August 1957, with the first Ford F-600 medium truck, very similar to the US-made F-600, leaving the production line featuring a Y-block engine, 40% of its parts being Brazilian made. The remaining items were still imported from the United States, but gradually, as the number of OEM parts suppliers in Brazil grew, this number decreased significantly. The F-600 was followed in 1958 by the F-100 pick-up truck and in 1959 by the F-350 light truck.

In 1958 the Ipiranga Plant was expanded with the start of local engine production, the 272 Y-block engine.

=== 1960s: Expansion ===
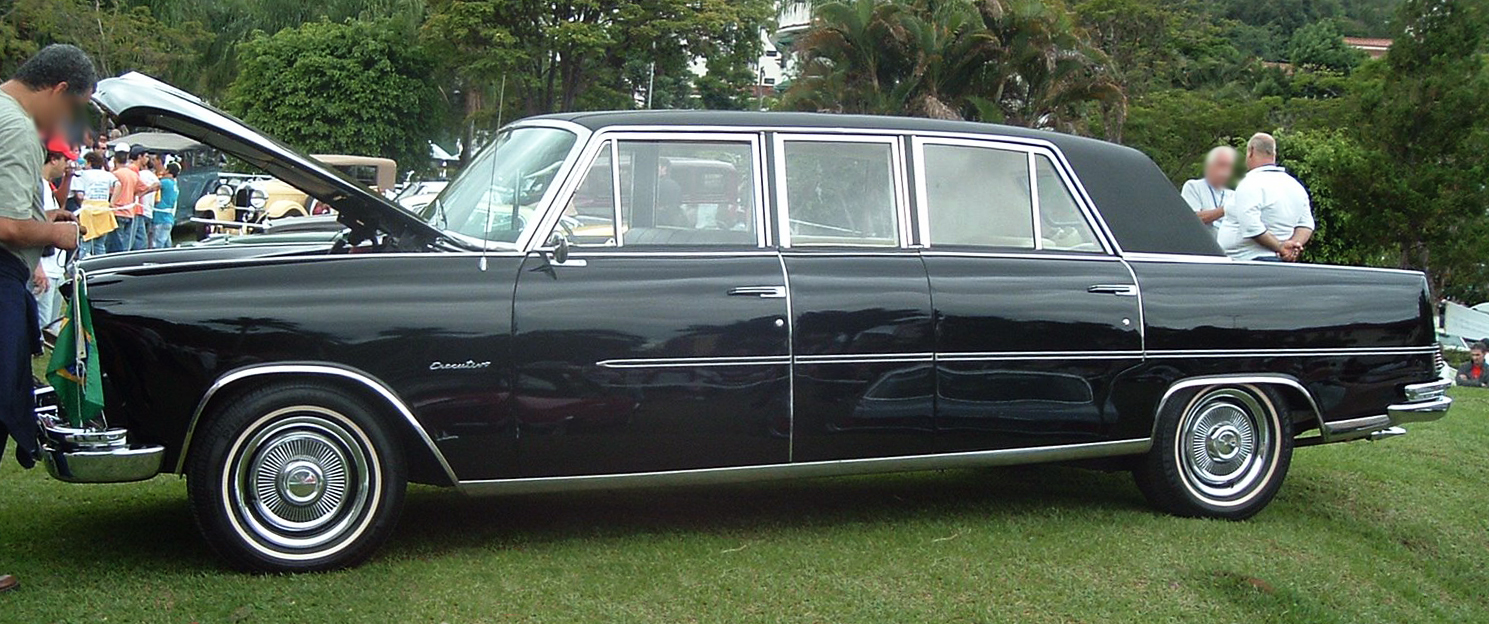
Aero Willys Itamaraty Executivo 1967

On 9 October 1967, Ford took control of troubled Willys-Overland do Brasil as majority shareholder and integrated the factory in São Bernardo do Campo as well as the product mix of two mid-range sedans, the Aero-Willys and the Willys Itamaraty, the utility vehicle Willys F-75, the pick-up truck F-75 and the ever-popular off-roader Willys Jeep into their Brazilian line-up.

When Ford acquired Willys' Brazilian operation, they inherited a work-in-progress that evolved into the front-wheel drive Ford Corcel, that was widely based on the Renault 12, but had its very own design. The Corcel was one of the most popular cars in the 1970s, it sold well as a four-door sedan and the two-door coupe was launched for younger buyers. Of those the more prestigious was the Ford Corcel GT with more power, a black hood and aggressive looking racing stripes on the sides.

The mid-range sedan at the time was the ancient Ford (Willys) Aero, in fact, it was a modified version of the Aero-Eagle that Kaiser-Willys had started building in the USA way back in 1954 and had been on the market as Aero Willys. When Chevrolet launched the Opala in 1968, and it proved to be very popular in both the 2-door and 4-door models, Ford needed urgently a competitive replacement for the outdated Aero.

Ford do Brasil also built the Ford Galaxie, one of the few V8 cars ever produced in Brazil, launched in 1967. It was initially equipped with 272cid or 292cid Y-blocks also used on pick-up trucks, using the North American 1966 four-door sedan body. It was the most expensive automobile produced in Brazil. In 1974 Ford opened an engine factory in Taubaté, near São Paulo, to accommodate the production of the 2.3L 4-cylinder engine used on the Brazilian Maverick and exported to the USA.

=== 1970s – Ford Maverick, Super Luxo, and the Oil Crisis ===
At the 1972 São Paulo Auto Show, in December, the Ford Maverick was launched as a 1973 model, although it was nearly identical to the 1970 American model with contoured bumpers. Three models were available: the base Ford Maverick Super, the more posh Ford Maverick Super Luxo, both with the Willys 6-cylinder as standard, and the sporty Ford Maverick GT with the 302 V8 engine, which was optional in the Super Luxo. Bigger than the average Brazilian car it sold well in the first two years, after that only the 2-door Super Luxos was keeping up the numbers. It received the Taubaté 2.3L 4-cylinder engine in 1975 and was heavily revised in 1977 but sales still declined and the Ford Maverick was quietly discontinued in 1979.

During the world oil shock of the 1970s, Brazil began what is now a thriving industry of ethanol fuels extracted from sugar cane. "Movido à álcool" (in English: "Powered by Alcohol") quickly became a sales slogan for any car. Ford do Brasil was on the verge of launching the German Ford Escort and swiftly developed the higher compression rate engine for its latest model. The same happened for the small block V8 of Ford's upper class models Ford Galaxie and Ford Landau, which were nonetheless eventually discontinued in 1983.

=== 1980s – Merger with Volkswagen ===
The difficult economic situation in South America in the 1980s due to astronomic inflation rates forced manufacturers to look into options that would help to save money. The Brazilian and Argentine subsidiaries of Ford and Volkswagen decided to merge into a new holding, named AutoLatina, in 1987. Volkswagen held 51% of the shares, and Ford the remaining 49%. Each brand maintained their own corporate image, the marketing and sales structures, as well as independent dealerships and service shops. All other departments were consolidated, allowing significant cost cutting, but also cutting the workforce almost in half.

The Ford Escort, introduced in both its 3- and 5-door version in 1983, and its convertible version (launched in 1985) was selling well. Yet, Ford decided to drop the 5-door version by 1986 and to concentrate on the younger car-buying market with its 3-door version. In 1989, Ford do Brasil exchanged the 1.6 CHT engine for the 1.8 version of the VW AP engine into the Ford Escort, mated to a gearbox from the German Volkswagen Golf, the performance rose to 90HP in the Ghia version and 99HP in the sporty XR3.

The joint car project resulted in new models like the Ford Verona (known as Volkswagen Apollo) that was launched in 1989. These new cars, with identical platforms and VW engines – although a 1.6 version with CHT engine was available, could be produced for a fraction of the cost, keeping both brands competitive against main rival Chevrolet.

In 1990 the Ford Versailles (a facelifted version of the Volkswagen Santana), was launched in an increasingly more positive economical climate.

=== 1990s: Regained independence ===
Ford and Volkswagen split amicably back to their individual divisions in 1994. This was partly due to the 75th anniversary of Ford do Brasil and partly because the dwindling sales figures on Ford's end prompted the American carmaker to seek independence from Volkswagen, to regain total control over all operations and to apply the lean production methods that had improved competitiveness in their home market. However technically Ford would continue to rely on engines and drivetrains from their former partner.

In 1996 the German Ford Fiesta was also introduced as Ford's new low end model into the market, replacing the 1.0 Ford Escort Hobby that had been launched in 1993 as a "carro popular" (the people's car), a government incentive to the manufactures to produce cheap and fuel efficient cars. As a matter of fact the entire, now restyled, production of the whole range of Ford Escort models was relocated to Argentina, including the first Escort station wagon to be sold in Brazil.

=== 2000s: Ford Fusion, Fiesta, Mondeo, and EcoSport ===
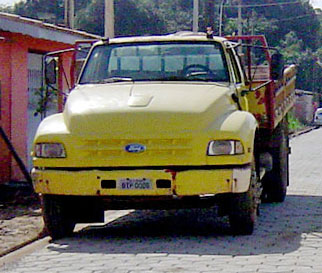
The Ford F12000/14000 was built from 1988 until 1996

Ford do Brasil manufactured models with four-cylinder engines 1.0/1.6 Zetec-Rocam and the 2.0 liter Duratec on localized low-cost versions of the global platforms like the Ford Ka, Ford Fiesta and the Ford Ecosport, a XUV version of the European Ford Fusion mk1.

In 2000 Ford closed the Ipiranga Plant, which produced CKD trucks and automobiles.

Part of the overall success of the Ford America Latina operations, currently the one that provides the highest profit within the Ford Motor Company global operation, was the brand new factory in Camaçari in the northern State of Bahia in which Ford invested US$4 billion and created an environment that consolidates production line with their direct suppliers' own facilities. The Ford EcoSport mini SUV and the Ford Fiesta were made for the Brazilian market and exported to other developing countries as well.

While Ford continued to offer European models like the Focus (imported from Argentina) the Ford F-250 pick-up truck, Since 2006, the four-cylinder version of the Mexican-built Ford Fusion had been sold as a lower-production-cost replacement for the Ford Mondeo, as the fourth generation model would have been too expensive to be sold in Brazil, although it was sold in Argentina. The Ford Fusion had sold quite well in Brazil, often topping the charts as the best-selling car of its segment in Brazil.

Ford do Brasil had at that time 396 sales points and 233 dealerships.

=== 2020s: Ending local production ===
In 2019 it was decided to close the São Bernardo do Campo plant, sold to Construtora São José and FRAM Capital, ending the national production and exiting the South American truck market.

Ford Motor Company ceased all production in Brazil on 12 January 2021, after 101 years. The Camaçari, Bahia and Taubaté plants were shut immediately. The Troller plant in Horizonte, Ceará closed on 31 December 2021. It sold 119,454 cars, 19,864 pick-ups and 579 trucks in Brazil in 2020. This makes it the 5th best-selling automaker in Brazil, with 7.14% of Brazilian automotive market. Models sold in Brazil are now produced elsewhere, such as the Bronco (USA) and Ranger (Argentina).

With the discontinuation of the Ka, Ford now focuses on importing the Mustang, Ranger, SUVs and the Transit.

== Products ==
=== Current ===
As of July 2024:

- Ford Mustang (1964–present) – Built in USA
- Ford Ranger (1994–present) – Built in Argentina
- Ford Transit/E-Transit (2009–2014, 2021–present) – Built in Uruguay by Nordex S.A. Since 2021
- Ford Territory (2021–present) – Built in China
- Ford Bronco Sport (2021–present) – Built in Mexico
- Ford Maverick (2022–present) – Built in Mexico
- Ford Mustang Mach-E (2023–present) – Built in Mexico
- Ford F-150 (2023–present) – Built in USA

=== Discontinued ===
- Ford Model T (1909–1928)
- Ford Coupe
- Ford F-100 (1957–1997)
- Ford F-600 (1957–1974)
- Ford Galaxie (1967–1979)
- Ford Galaxie LTD (1969–1981)
- Ford Belina (1970–1991)
- Ford Maverick (1973–1979)
- Ford Landau (1976–1983)
- Ford Corcel II (1978–1986)
- Ford F-1000 (1979–1998)
- Ford Del Rey (1981–1991)
- Ford Pampa (1982–1997)
- Ford Escort (1983–2003) – Built in Argentina from 1996 to 2003
- Ford Verona (1989–1996)
- Ford Versailles (1991–1996)
- Ford F-250 (1999–2012)
- Ford F-250 Tropivan (1999–2012)
- Ford Taurus – Built in USA for the Brazilian market
- Ford Mondeo – Built in Europe for the Brazilian market
- Ford Courier (1998–2013)
- Ford Transit (2009–2014)
- Ford Fiesta (Hatchback: 1996–2019 – Sedan: 1999–2019) – 6th generations. Built in Brazil
- Ford Super Duty (1998–2019) – Built in Brazil
- Ford Cargo (1981–2019) – Built in Brazil
- Ford Fusion (2006–2020)
- Ford Ka (1997–2021) – Built in Brazil
- Ford EcoSport (2003–2021) – Built in Brazil

=== Willys-Overland-derived projects ===
- Ford Jeep (1968–1983)
- Ford F-75 (1968–1983)
- Ford F-85
- Ford Aero (1968–1971)
- Ford Itamaraty (1968–1971)
- Ford Rural (1968–1977)
- Ford Corcel (1968–1977)
