= Brennabor Typ A =

Six-cylinder car

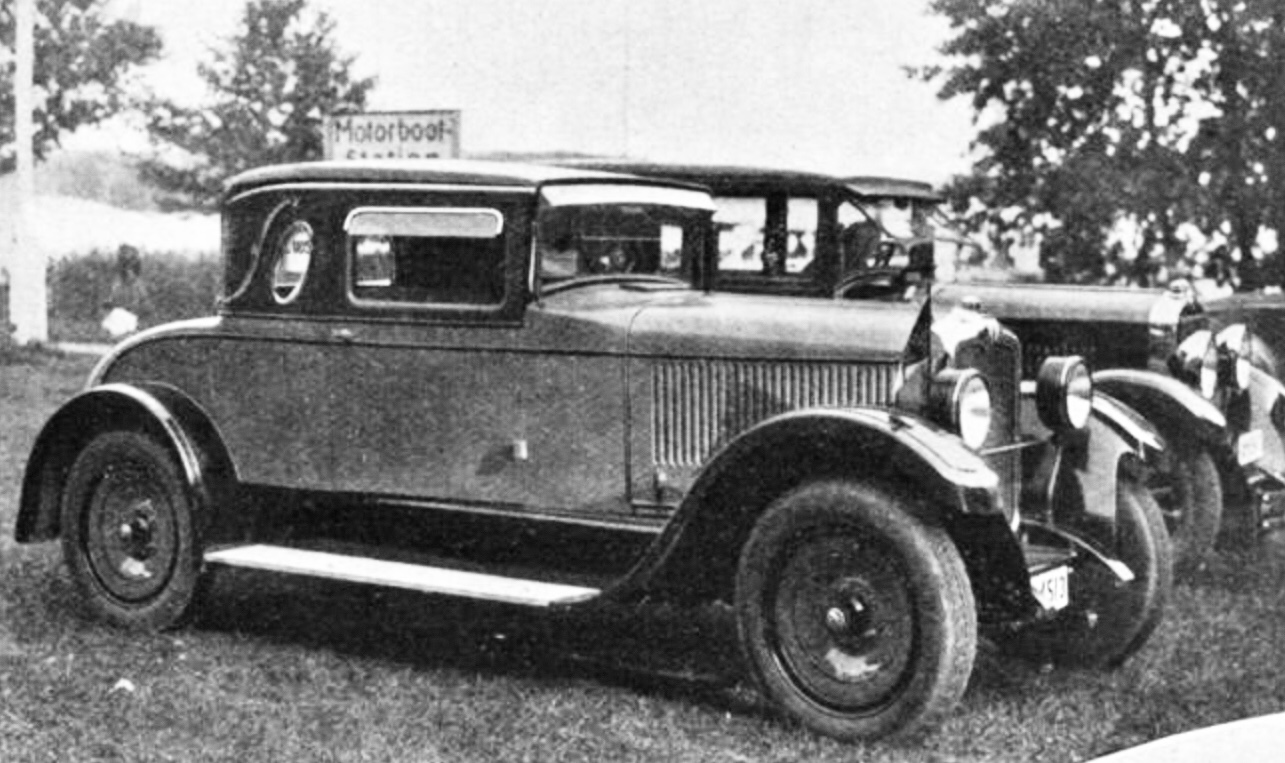
Brennabor Typ AK (1928-1929)

Brennabor Typ A was the designation given to a six-cylinder car introduced by the Brennabor company in 1927. Successive versions appeared in subsequent years until the Typ As were replaced, by the Brennabor Juwel 6, for 1930.

In 1927 the Brennabor company introduced the 2.5-litre six-cylinder Brennabor Typ AL which complemented the Brennabor Typ R, hitherto Brennabor's largest model, and so extended the manufacturer's range up a level.

The Typ AL was powered by a 6-cylinder side-valve engine of 2.55 Litres, mounted ahead of the driver and delivering 45 hp at 3,300 rpm. Power was delivered to the rear wheels through a single plate dry clutch and a four-speed gear box controlled with a centrally positioned floor-mounted gear stick.

The car sat on a U-profile pressed steel chassis with rigid axles and semi-elliptical leaf springing. At this stage it was offered only as a four-door “Pullman-limousine” (large saloon/sedan). The mechanically linked foot brake operated directly on all four wheels, while the handbrake operated on the drive-shaft.

A year later, in 1928, the AL was joined by the Brennabor Typ AK which shared the engine and other mechanical components of the AL, but was shorter and lighter, and therefore faster. The AK was available as a four-door sedan/saloon, a soft/open topped saloon/sedan or as a two-door full cabriolet.

Further extension of the range took place in 1928 with the arrival of the Brennabor Typ ASL and Brennabor Typ ASK. These shared the dimensions and many mechanical elements with, respectively, the Typ AL and Typ AK but they featured a bored out version of the company's six-cylinder engine which in this form had a capacity of 3,080 cc, giving rise to an increase in claimed power output from 45 to 55 hp and a corresponding increase of 5 km/h (3 mph) in the maximum speed. Advertised fuel consumption was also increased by more than 15%.

In 1929 the range was rationalised. The 2.5-litre models were delisted and the 3.1-litre models were replaced with the Brennabor Typ AFL and Brennabor Typ AFK. These cars differed little from their predecessors in terms of dimensions and mechanical components, with the notable exception of the gear box which now had only three ratios. Body style were rationalised, the shorter Typ AFK being offered now only as a “cabrio-limousine” (soft/open topped saloon/sedan).

In addition, the prices of the six-cylinder Brennabors were significantly reduced in 1929. By 1930, when the Typ A was replaced by the Juwel 6, approximately 10,000 Typ As had been produced.

== Technical details ==
Type	AL (10/45 PS) (10 tax horsepower / 45 German hp)	AK (10/45 PS) (10 tax horsepower / 45 German hp)	ASL (12/55 PS) (12 tax horsepower / 55 German hp)	ASK (12/55 PS) (12 tax horsepower / 55 German hp)	AFL (12/55 PS) (12 tax horsepower / 55 German hp)	AFK (12/55 PS) (12 tax horsepower / 55 German hp)
Years in production	1927 - 1929	1928 - 1929	1928 - 1929	1928 - 1929	1929 - 1930	1929
Bodies	4-door “Pullman” saloon/sedan	4-door saloon/sedan 2-door cabriolet	4-door “Pullman” saloon/sedan	4-door saloon/sedan 2-door cabriolet	4-door “Pullman” saloon/sedan	4-door saloon/sedan
Motor	6 cyl. In-line 4-stroke	6 cyl. In-line 4-stroke	6 cyl. In-line 4-stroke	6 cyl. In-line 4-stroke	6 cyl. In-line 4-stroke	6 cyl. In-line 4-stroke
Valvegear	side (SV)	side (SV)	side (SV)	side (SV)	side (SV)	side (SV)
Bore x stroke	70 mm x 111 mm	70 mm x 111 mm	77 mm x 111 mm	77 mm x 111 mm	77 mm x 111 mm	77 mm x 111 mm
cylinder capacity	2547 cc	2547 cc	3080 cc	3080 cc	3080 cc	3080 cc
Power (PS / German hp)	45	45	55	55	55	55
Power (kW)	33	33	40	40	40	40
at rpm (1/min.)	3,300	3,300	3,200	3,200	3,200	3,200
Torque (Nm)	127,5	127,5	147,2	147,2	147,2	147,2
at rpm (1/min.)	1,400	1,400	1,400	1,400	1,400	1,400
Compression ratio	5.1 : 1	5.1 : 1	5.1 : 1	5.1 : 1	5.1 : 1	5.1 : 1
fuel consumption (litres per 100 km)	14 L / 100 km	12 L / 100 km	16 L / 100 km	14 L / 100 km	16 L / 100 km	14 L / 100 km
Gears	4-speed with central floor-mounted lever	4-speed with central floor-mounted lever	4-speed with central floor-mounted lever	4-speed with central floor-mounted lever	3-speed with central floor-mounted lever	3-speed with central floor-mounted lever
Top speed	80 km/h (50 mph)	85 km/h (53 mph)	85 km/h (53 mph)	90 km/h (56 mph)	85 km/h (53 mph)	90 km/h (56 mph)
Unladen weight	ca. 1650 kg	ca. 1550 kg	ca. 1650 kg	ca. 1550 kg	ca. 1650 kg	ca. 1550 kg
Gross loaded weight	ca. 2175 kg	ca. 1950 kg	ca. 2175 kg	ca. 1950 kg	ca. 2175 kg	ca. 1950 kg
Electrical system	6 Volt	6 Volt	6 Volt	6 Volt	6 Volt	6 Volt
Length	4500 mm	4200 mm	4500 mm	4200 mm	4500 mm	4200 mm
Width	1720 mm	1720 mm	1720 mm	1720 mm	1720 mm	1720 mm
Height	1860 mm	1860 mm	1860 mm	1860 mm	1860 mm	1860 mm
Wheel base	3290 mm	3000 mm	3290 mm	3000 mm	3290 mm	3000 mm
Track front / back	1420 mm / 1420 mm	1420 mm / 1420 mm	1420 mm / 1420 mm	1420 mm / 1420 mm	1420 mm / 1420 mm	1420 mm / 1420 mm
Tires	30" x 5,77" ND	30" x 5,25" ND	30" x 5,77" ND	30" x 5,25" ND	6,00-20" extra	5,00-18"

== Sources ==
- Werner Oswald: Deutsche Autos 1920–1945. Motorbuch Verlag Stuttgart, 10. Auflage (1996), ISBN 3-87943-519-7
