= Brennabor Juwel 8 =

The Brennabor Juwel 8 is an eight-cylinder automobile introduced the Brennabor company in 1930 to complement their then recently introduced Juwel 6 model.

The Juwel 8 was powered by a newly developed 8-cylinder side-valve engine of 3.4 litres, mounted ahead of the driver and delivering 60 hp at 3,200 rpm. Power was delivered to the rear wheels through a single plate dry clutch and a three-speed gear box controlled using a centrally positioned floor-mounted gear stick.

The car sat on a U-profile pressed steel chassis with rigid axles and semi-elliptical leaf springing. It was offered as a four-door four-seater sedan/saloon or a four-door “Pullman” sedan/saloon with six seats. The mechanically linked foot brake operated directly on all four wheels, while the handbrake operated on the rear wheels.

The last Juwel 8 appears to have been produced in 1932, by when approximately 100 had been built.

== Technical data ==
Type	Juwel 8 (14/60 PS) (14 tax horsepower / 60 German hp)
Production years	1930 - 1932
Bodies	4-door 4-seat saloon/sedan 4-door 6-seat “Pullman” saloon/sedan
Motor	8 cyl. In-line 4-stroke
Ventile	side (SV)
Bore x Stroke	74 mm × 100 mm (2.913 in × 3.937 in)
Cylinder capacity	3,417 cc (208.5 cu in)
Power (German hp or PS)	60 PS (44 kW)
Power (kW)	44 kW (59 hp)
at rpm	3,200
Compression ratio	5.4 : 1
Fuel consumption	15 L/100 km (19 mpg_{‑imp}; 16 mpg_{‑US})
Transmission	3-speed manual with central floor-mounted lever
Top speed	100 km/h (62 mph)
Unladen weight	ca. 1,500 kg (3,300 lb)
Fully laden weight	ca. 2,000 kg (4,400 lb)
Electrical system	2 x 6 Volt
Length	4,300 mm (169.29 in)
Width	1,630 mm (64.17 in)
Height	1,800 mm (70.87 in)
Wheelbase	3,050 mm (120.08 in)
Track front / back	1,340 mm (52.76 in) / 1,340 mm (52.76 in)
Tires	5.50-18"

== Sources ==
• Oswald, Werner: Deutsche Autos 1920–1945, Motorbuch Verlag Stuttgart, 10. Auflage (1996), ISBN 3-87943-519-7
