= Brennabor Typ N =

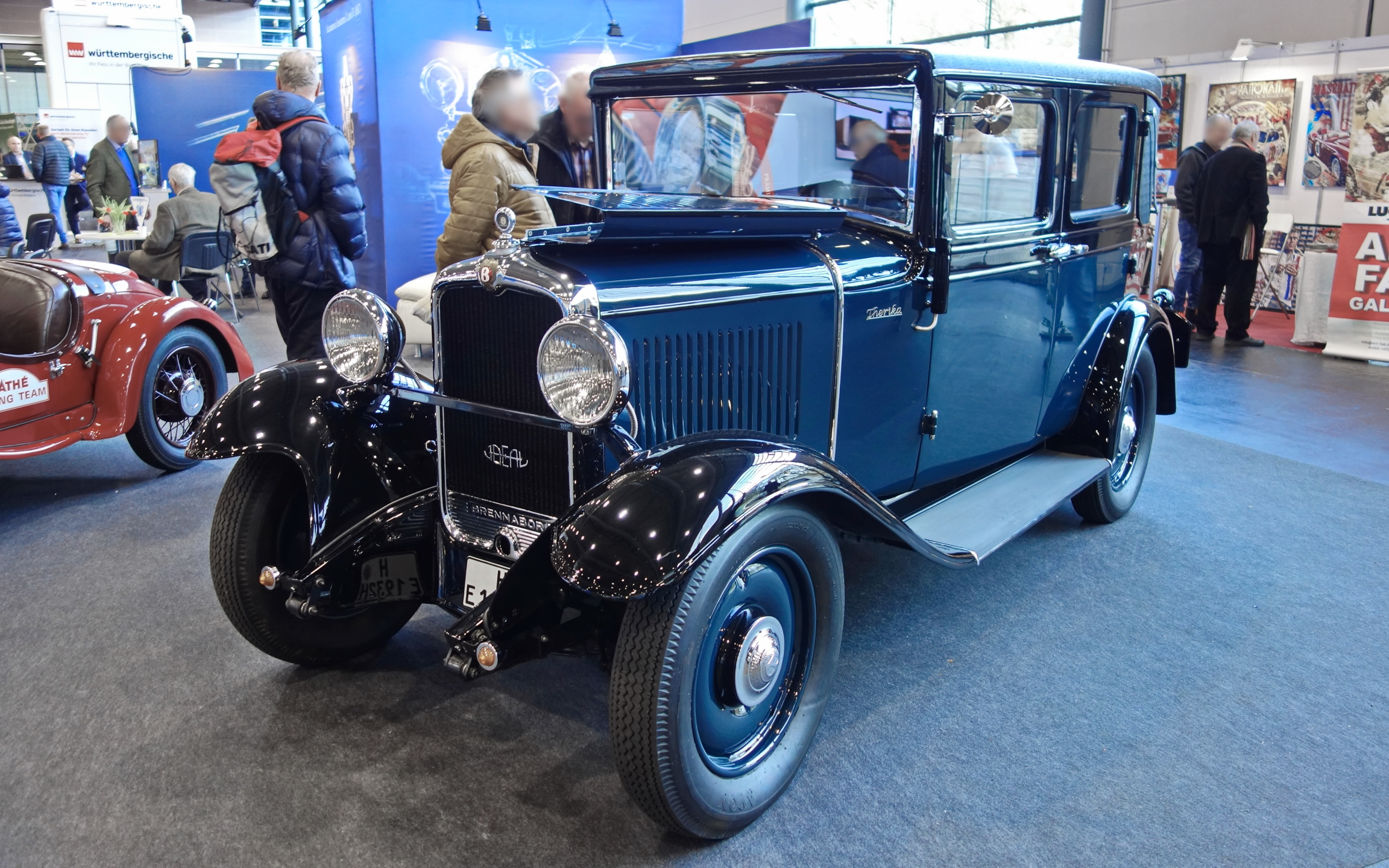
1932 Brennabor Ideal N Extra

In 1929 the Brennabor Ideal Typ N was introduced by the Brennabor company, which for much of that decade had been Germany's leading auto maker.

The car replaced the Brennabor Typ Z which had been in production for only a year. The new model had its four-cylinder engine increased in size to 1.64 litres. In this application a maximum power output of 30 hp at 3,200 rpm was claimed.

In 1931 the introduction of the Brennabor Ideal Extra Typ N marked a further upgrade of what was now (following the introduction in that year of the smaller Brennabor Typ C 4/20) the middle model in the company's three model range. The "Extra" retained the 1.64-litre engine, but features a slightly longer and wider body. The choice of bodies was also extended with the inclusion in the range of a six-seater "touring car" body which in fact shared the larger chassis and body work of the company's six-cylinder Juwel 6 model.

By 1933, when the company was forced by economic conditions to cease car production, approximately 10,000 of the Ideal Typ N and Ideal Extra Typ N models had been built.

== Technical details ==
Type	Ideal N (7/30 PS) (7 tax horsepower / 30 German hp)	Ideal N Extra (7/30 PS) (7 tax horsepower / 30 German hp)
Years in production	1929–1930	1930–1933
Bodies	2- or 4-door closed or open-topped sedan/saloon 2-door full cabriolet	2- or 4-door closed or open-topped sedan/saloon 2-door full cabriolet Long-bodied six-seater touring car
Motor	4 cyl. In-line 4-stroke	4 cyl. In-line 4-stroke
Valvegear	side (SV)	side (SV)
Bore × stroke	74 mm × 96 mm	74 mm × 96 mm
capacity	1640 cm^{3}	1640 cm^{3}
Power (PS / German hp)	30	30
Power (kW)	22	22
at rpm (1/min.)	3,200	3,200
Torque (Nm)	83.4	83.4
at rpm (1/min.)	800	800
Compression ratio	5.25 : 1	5.25 : 1
fuel consumption	10.5 L / 100 km	10.5 L / 100 km
Gears	3-speed with central floor-mounted lever	3-speed with central floor-mounted lever
Top speed	75 km/h (47 mph)	75 km/h (47 mph)
Unladen weight	c. 1200 kg	c. 1250 kg
Gross loaded weight	c. 1550 kg	c. 1600 kg
Electrical system	6 Volt	6 Volt
Length	3850 mm	3960–4050 mm
Width	1570 mm	1630 mm
Height	1750 mm	1750 mm
Wheel base	2600 mm	2650–2850 mm
Track front / back	1280 mm / 1280 mm	1340 mm / 1340 mm
Tires	4.75-18"	4.75-18"

== Sources ==
- Werner Oswald: Deutsche Autos 1920–1945. Motorbuch Verlag Stuttgart, 10. Auflage (1996), ISBN 3-87943-519-7
