= Brennabor Typ C =

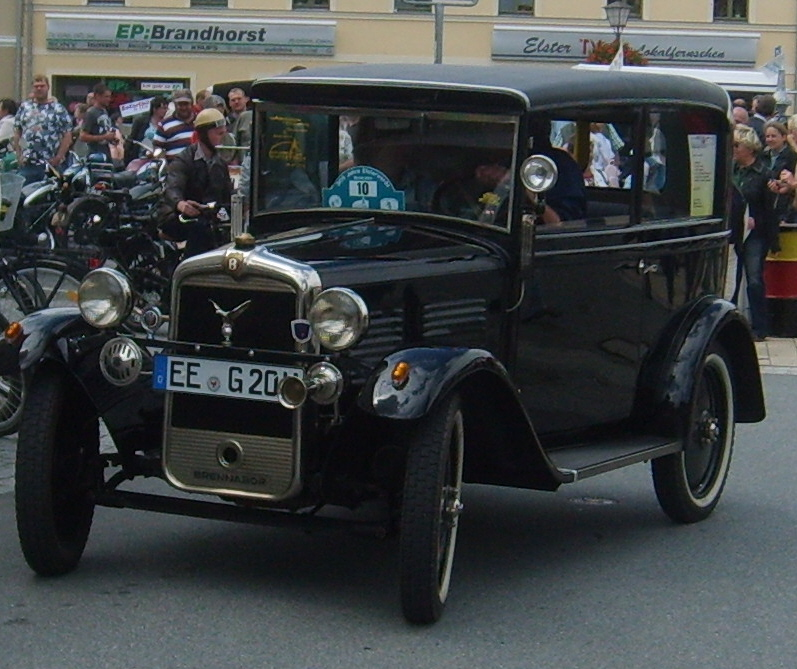
Brennabor Typ C (1931)

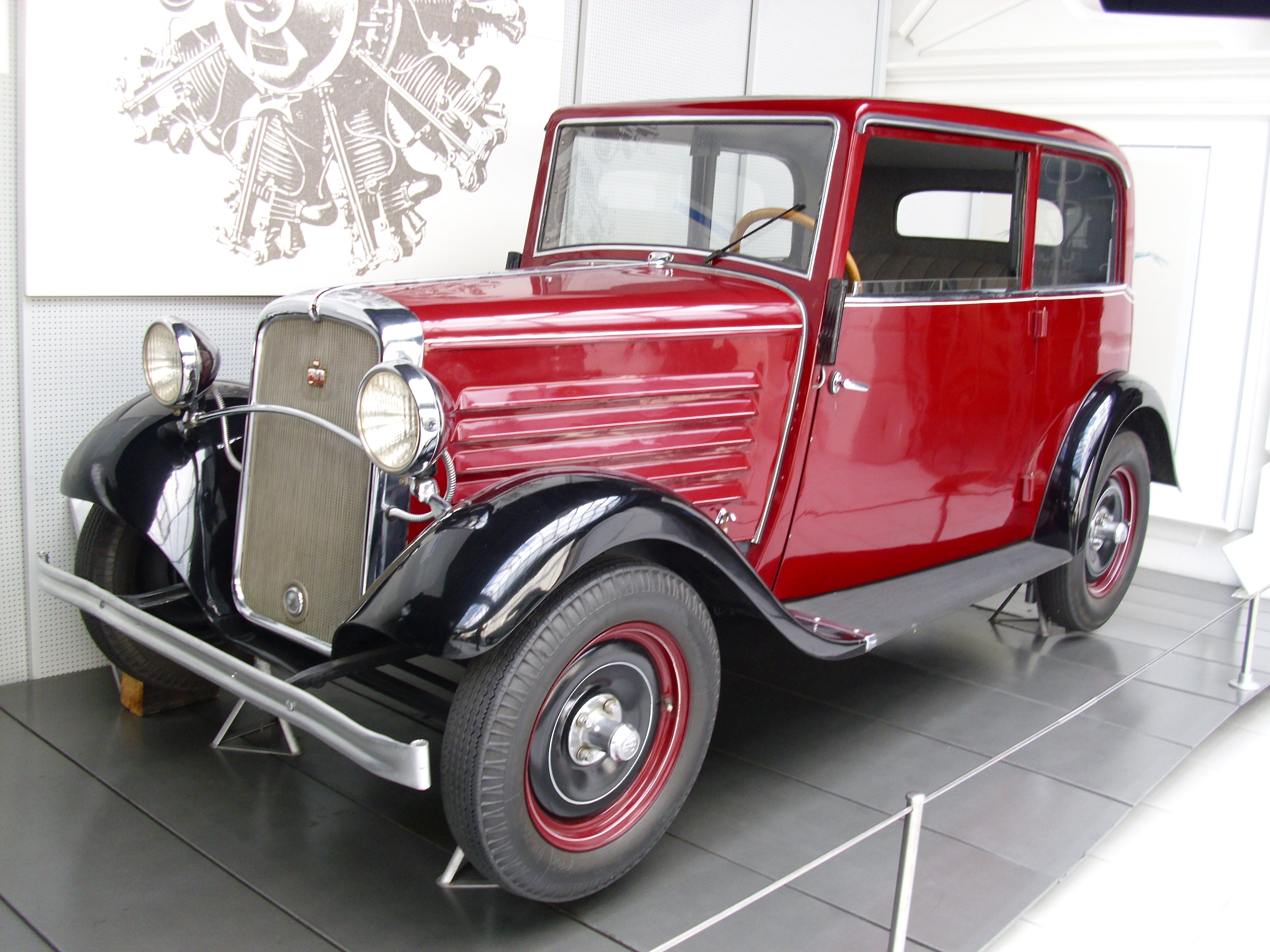
Brennabor Typ D (1933)

The 1 Litre Brennabor Typ C is a small car introduced by Brennabor in 1931. In the wake of a sustained period of economic difficulties it represented a belated extension of the company's range into the "small car" sector which hitherto Brennabor had ignored. In 1933 the car was upgraded and became the short-lived Brennabor Typ D

The Typ C was powered by a newly developed 4-cylinder 1 litre side-valve engine of 3.4 litres, mounted ahead of the driver and delivering 20 hp at 2,800 rpm. Power was delivered to the rear wheels through a single plate dry clutch and a three-speed gear box controlled using a centrally positioned floor-mounted gear stick.

The car sat on a U-profile pressed steel chassis with rigid axles and semi-elliptical leaf springing. It was offered as a two-door sedan/saloon, a two-door cabriolet or a two-day roadster, in every case with a 2+2 seating configuration. The mechanically linked foot brake operated directly on all four wheels, while the handbrake operated on the rear wheels.

In the two years before the appearance of an upgraded model only about 1,000 Typ Cs were sold.

The concept was reworked and the car appeared as the Brennabor Typ D in 1933, now slightly longer than before and with a higher compression ratio which correlated with a 2 hp power increase. The Typ D shared its predecessor's fate in the market place, however, and was not a commercial success. Approximately a further 1,000 of Brennabor's 1 litre cars were sold as Typ Ds before the company's decision, towards the end of 1933, to abandon automobile production.

== Technical data ==
Type	Typ C 4/20	Typ D 4/22
Production years	1930 – 1932	1933
Bodies	2-door 2+2-seat saloon/sedan, 2-door 2+2-seat cabriolet, 2-door 2+2-seat roadster	2-door 2+2-seat saloon/sedan, 2-door 2+2-seat cabriolet, 2-door 2+2-seat roadster
Motor	4 cyl. In-line 4-stroke	4 cyl. In-line 4-stroke
Ventile	side (SV)	side (SV)
Bore x Stroke	62 mm (2.4 in) x 83 mm (3.3 in)	62 mm (2.4 in) x 83 mm (3.3 in)
Cylinder capacity (cc)	995	995
Power (German hp)	20	22
Power (kW)	14.7	16.2
at rpm	2,800	3,000
Compression ratio	5.2 : 1	5.3 : 1
Fuel consumption litres per 100 km	8 L / 100 km	8 L / 100 km
Transmission	3-speed manual with central floor-mounted lever	3-speed manual with central floor-mounted lever
Top speed	75 km/h (47 mph)	75 km/h (47 mph)
Unladen weight	600–700 kg (1,323–1,543 lb)	725–735 kg (1,598–1,620 lb)
Fully laden weight	900 – 1,000 kg (2,205 lb)	1050 – 1,060 kg (2,337 lb)
Electrical system	6 Volt	6 Volt
Length	3,300 mm (129.9 in)	3,600 mm (141.7 in)
Width	1,480 mm (58.3 in)	1,580 mm (62.2 in)
Height	1,675 mm (65.9 in)	1,610 mm (63.4 in)
Wheelbase	2,300 mm (90.6 in)	2,420 mm (95.3 in)
Track front / back	1250 mm / 1250 mm	1300 mm / 1300 mm
Tires	4,00-18" or 4,50-18"	4,50-17"

== Sources ==
- Oswald, Werner: Deutsche Autos 1920–1945, Motorbuch Verlag Stuttgart, 10. Auflage (1996), ISBN 3-87943-519-7
