= Brennabor Typ Z =

The Brennabor Typ Z, launched in 1928, was a car introduced by the Brennabor company, replacing the Brennabor Typ R, as the company's contender in the medium-sized car sector, had been a best seller on the German market during the modest return to economic growth that characterized the middle years of the decade after the reparations issue had, to an extent, been resolved. The Typ Z was itself replaced after just a year by Brennabor Ideal Typ N which would represent a more comprehensive upgrade

The Typ Z retained the same engine capacity and claimed 25 hp (19 kW) power output of its predecessor, but was slightly shorter and lower (though wider and no lighter). The rear axle was now provided with underslung half leaf springs, a system which would later be adopted by the competing auto-maker Horch for luxury models such as the Horch 850.

The Brennabor Typ Z was offered with a range of body types, with two or four doors and as a sedan or open-topped sedan. A two-door full cabriolet was also available. Approximately 10,000 were produced.

== Technical details ==
Type	Z (6/25 PS)
Years	1928 - 1929
Bodies	Two- and four-door “limousine” (saloon/sedan); Two-door cabriolet
Motor	4 cyl. In-line 4-stroke
Valvegear	side (SV)
Bore x stroke	70 mm x 102 mm (4.0 in)
capacity	1569 cc
Power	25 PS (18 kW; 25 hp)
at rpm (1/min.)	3,000
Torque (Nm)	83.4 N⋅m (62 lb⋅ft)
at rpm (1/min.)	800
Compression ratio	5,25 : 1
fuel consumption	10.5 L / 100 km
Gears	3-speed with central floor-mounted lever
Top speed	70 km/h (43 mph)
Unladen weight	ca. 1,150 kg (2,535 lb)
Gross loaded weight	ca. 1,500 kg (3,307 lb)
Electrical system	6 Volt
Length	3,850 mm (151.6 in)
Width	1,570 mm (61.8 in)
Height	1,750 mm (68.9 in)
Wheel base	2,600 mm (102.4 in)
Track front / back	1280 mm / 1280 mm
Tires	27" x 4,75" ND

== Sources ==
- Werner Oswald: Deutsche Autos 1920–1945. Motorbuch Verlag Stuttgart, 10. Auflage (1996), ISBN 3-87943-519-7
