= Brennabor =

Vehicle manufacturer

Brennabor-Werke AG
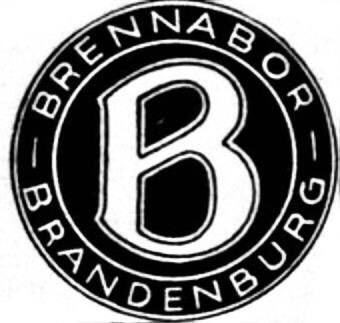
- Type: Car Company
- Industry: Manufacturing
- Founded: 1871; 155 years ago
- Founder: Adolf, Carl and Hermann Reichstein
- Defunct: 1945; 81 years ago
- Headquarters: Brandenburg an der Havel, Germany
- Products: cars; trucks; bicycles; infant buggies; Motorcycles
- Number of employees: 15 (1871); 300 (1874); 2,250 (1899); 2,500 (1908);3,500 (1913); 6,000 (1924); 1,100 (1932); 1,980 (1933); 1,620 (1934); 2,500 (1935); 3,300 (1936); 4,600 (1937); 4,926 (1938); 5,000 (1939);

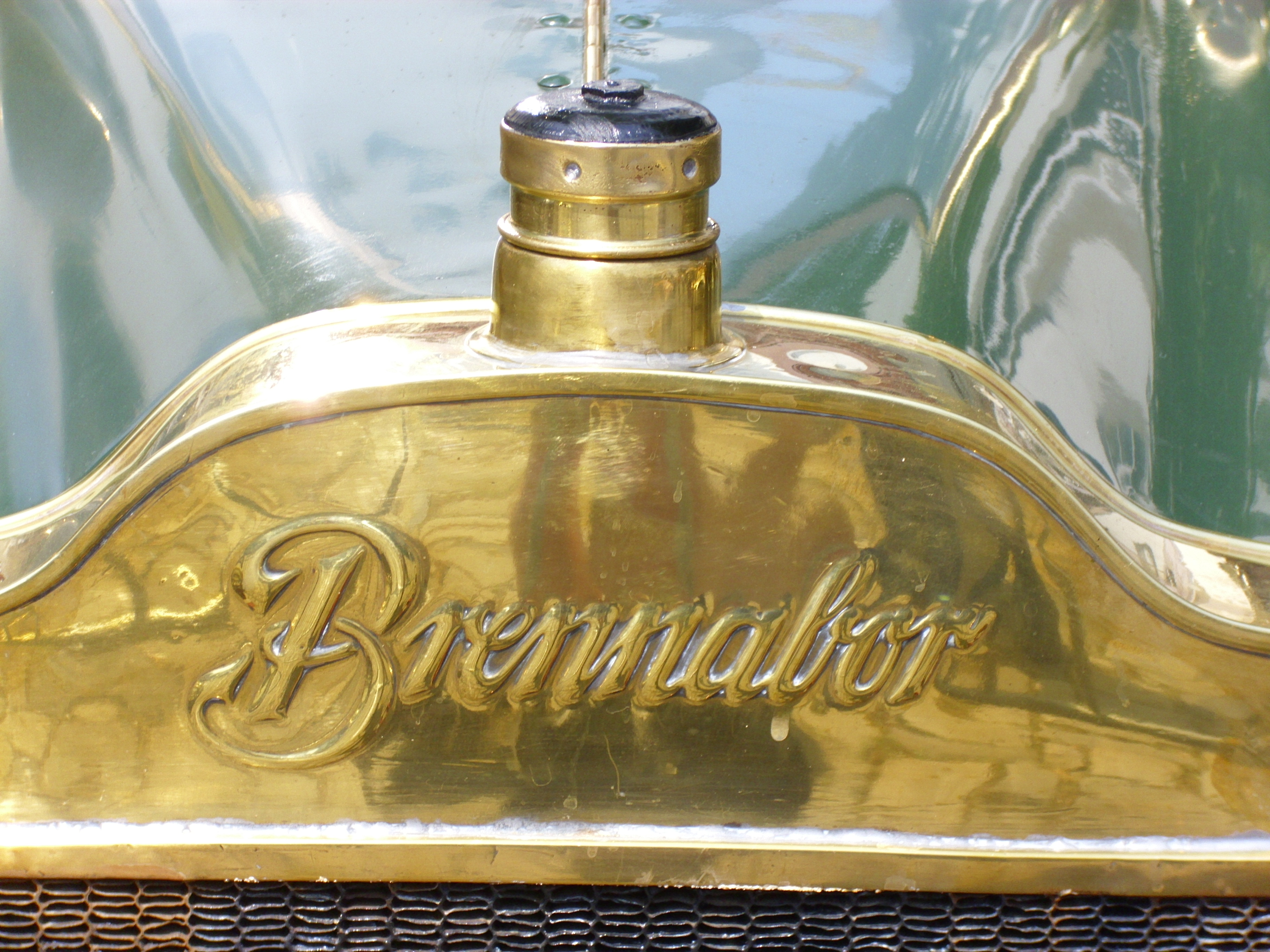

Brennabor-Werke AG (previously Brennabor-Werke Gebr. Reichstein) was a German manufacturer of infant buggies, bicycles, motorcycles and, for two decades, of powered motor vehicles. It was based in Brandenburg an der Havel and operated between 1871 and 1945. Brennabor is a Wendish name used to refer to the Havel town Brandenburg.

== History ==
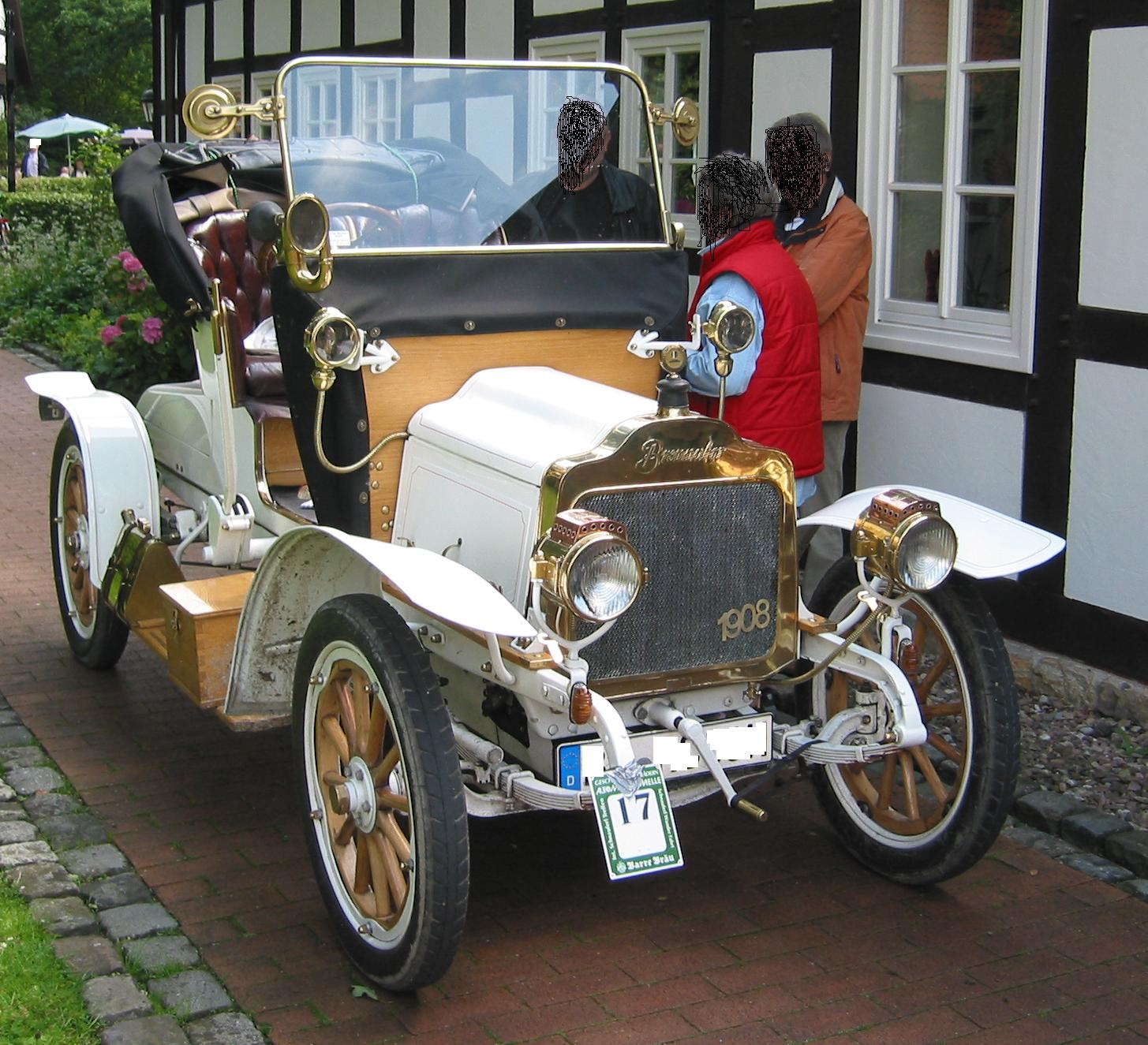
Volume production of motor cars began in 1908.

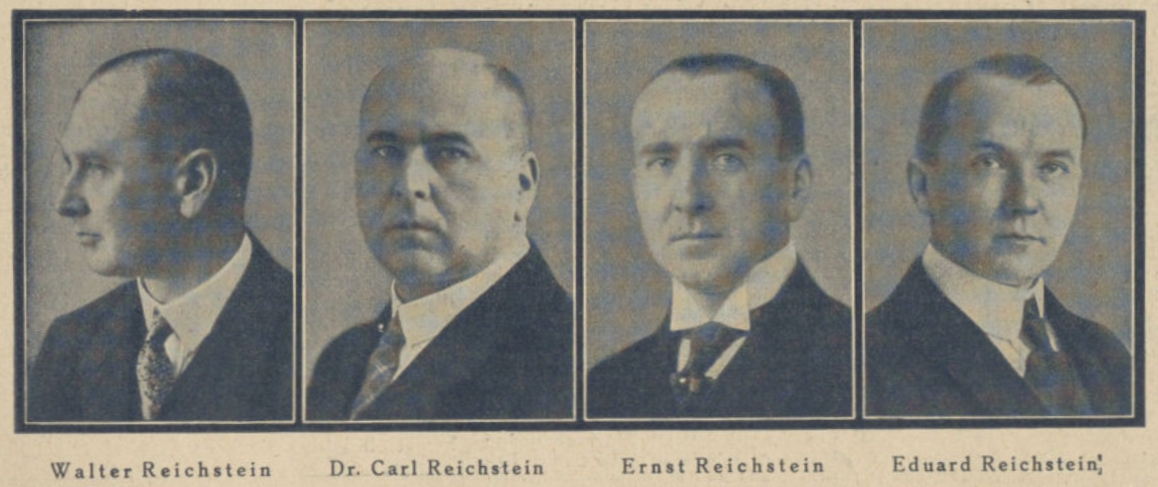
Reichstein Brothers

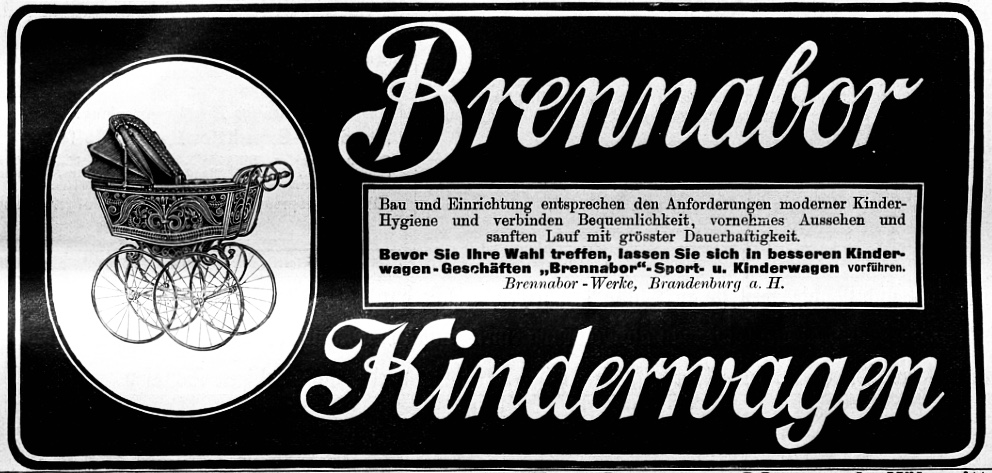
Brennabor infant buggies

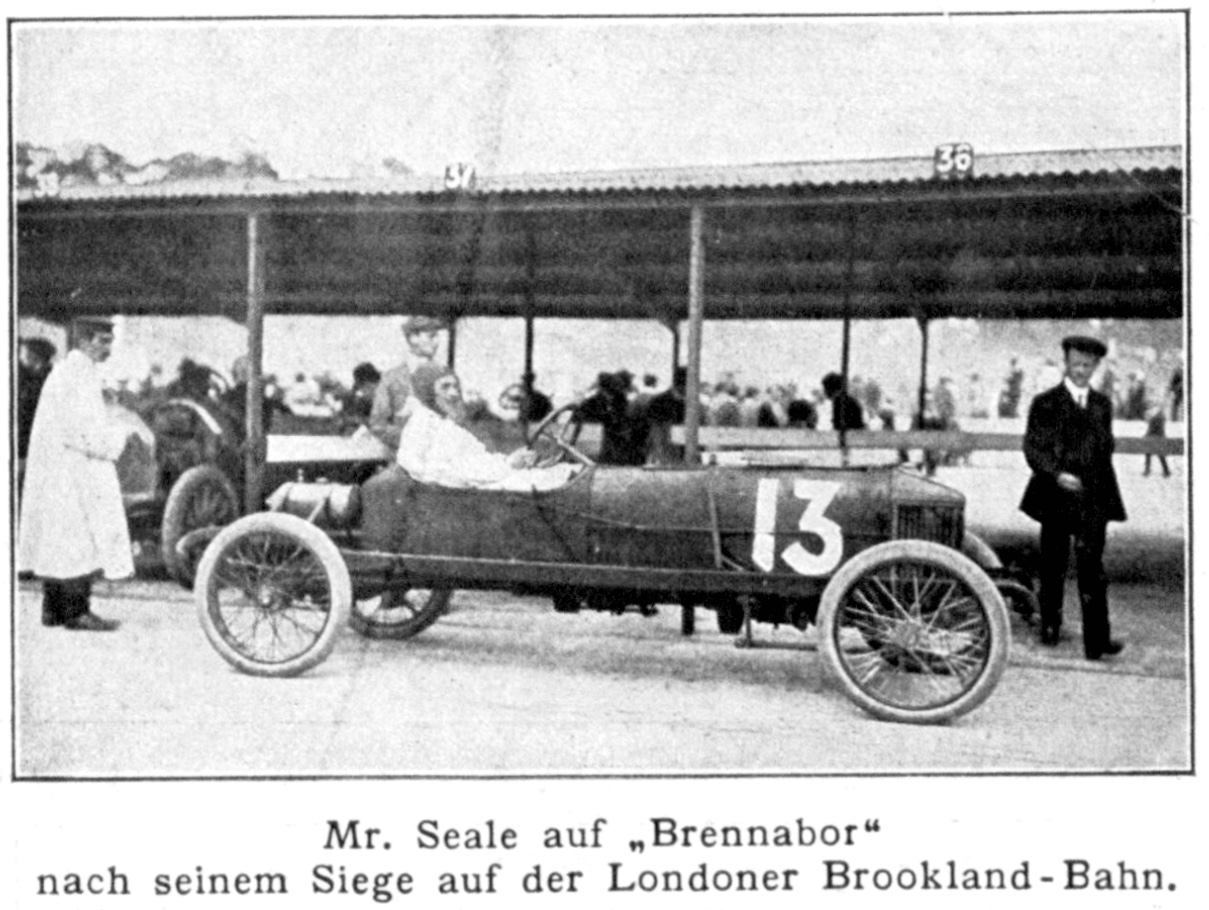
Brennabor 5.9 hp race car (1910)

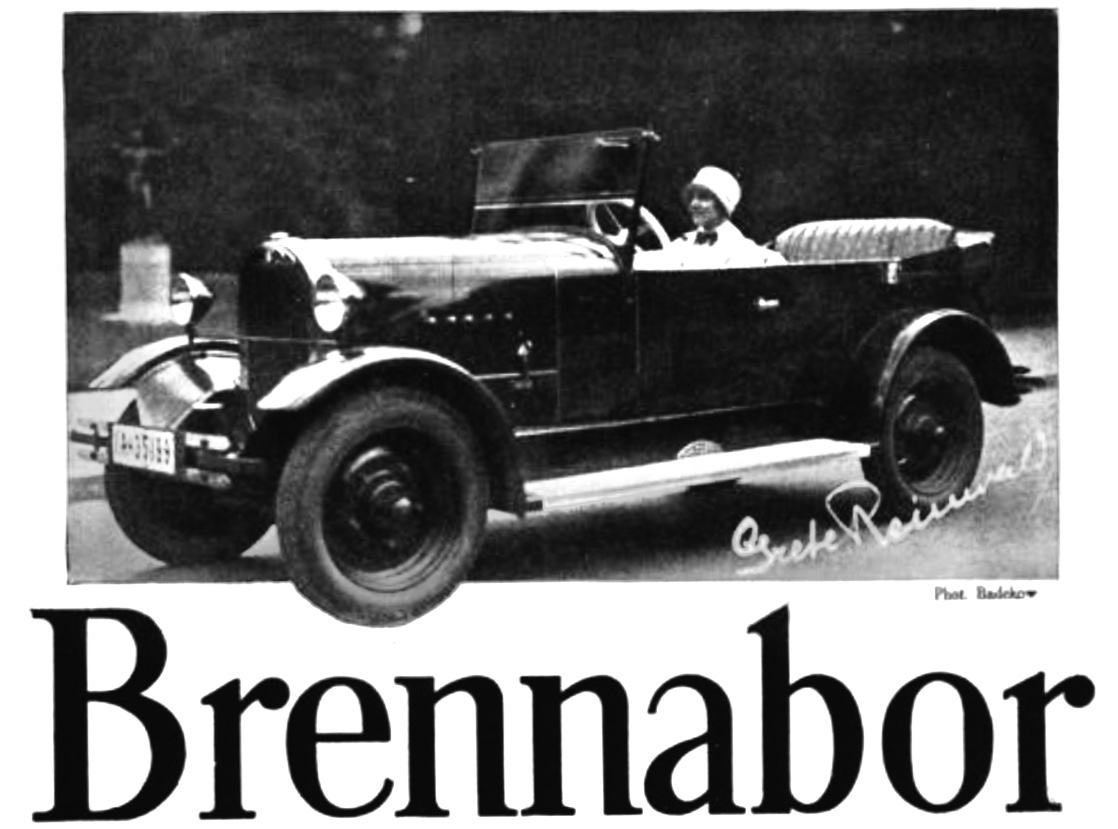
Grete Reinwald (25 May 1902 – 24 May 1983) German stage and film actress in her Brennabor

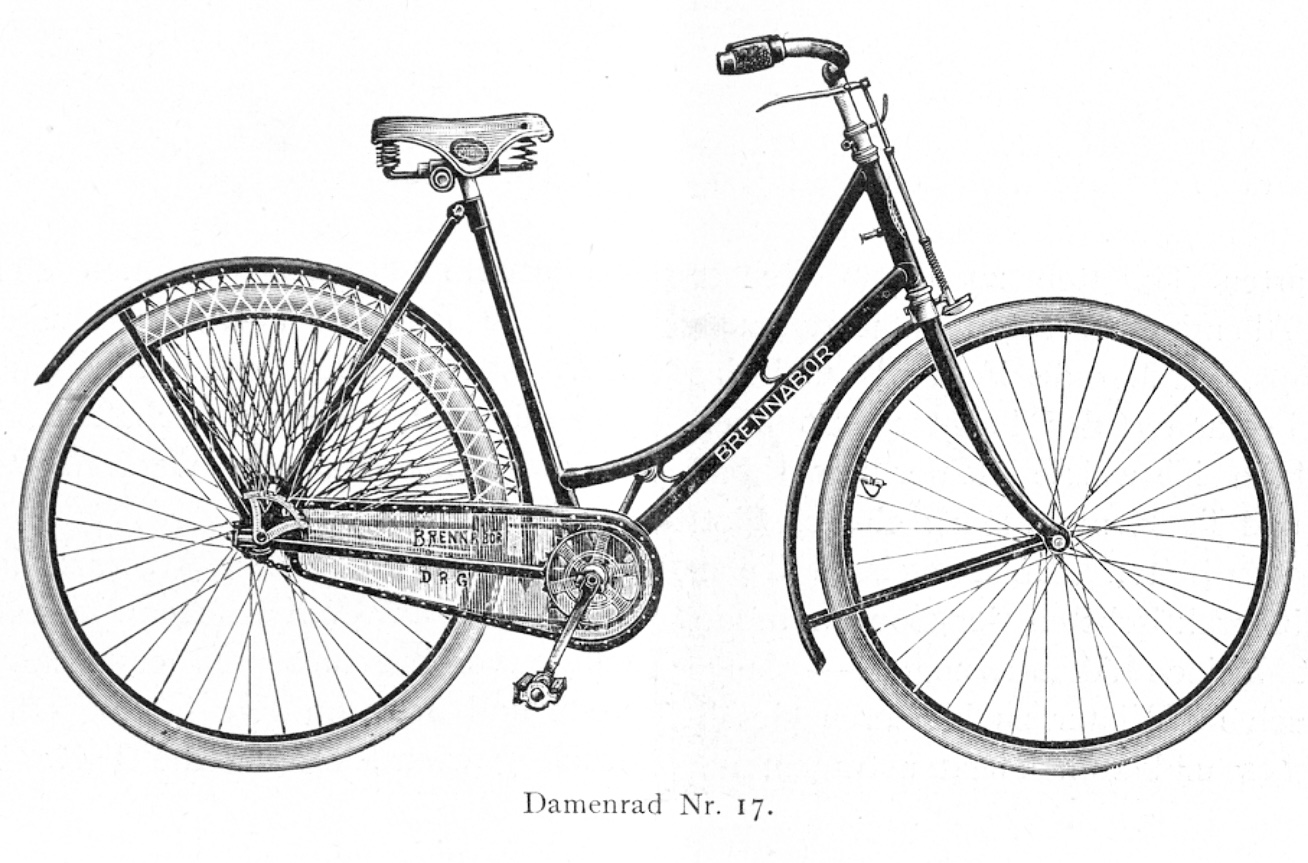
Brennabor women's bike type 17 (1898)

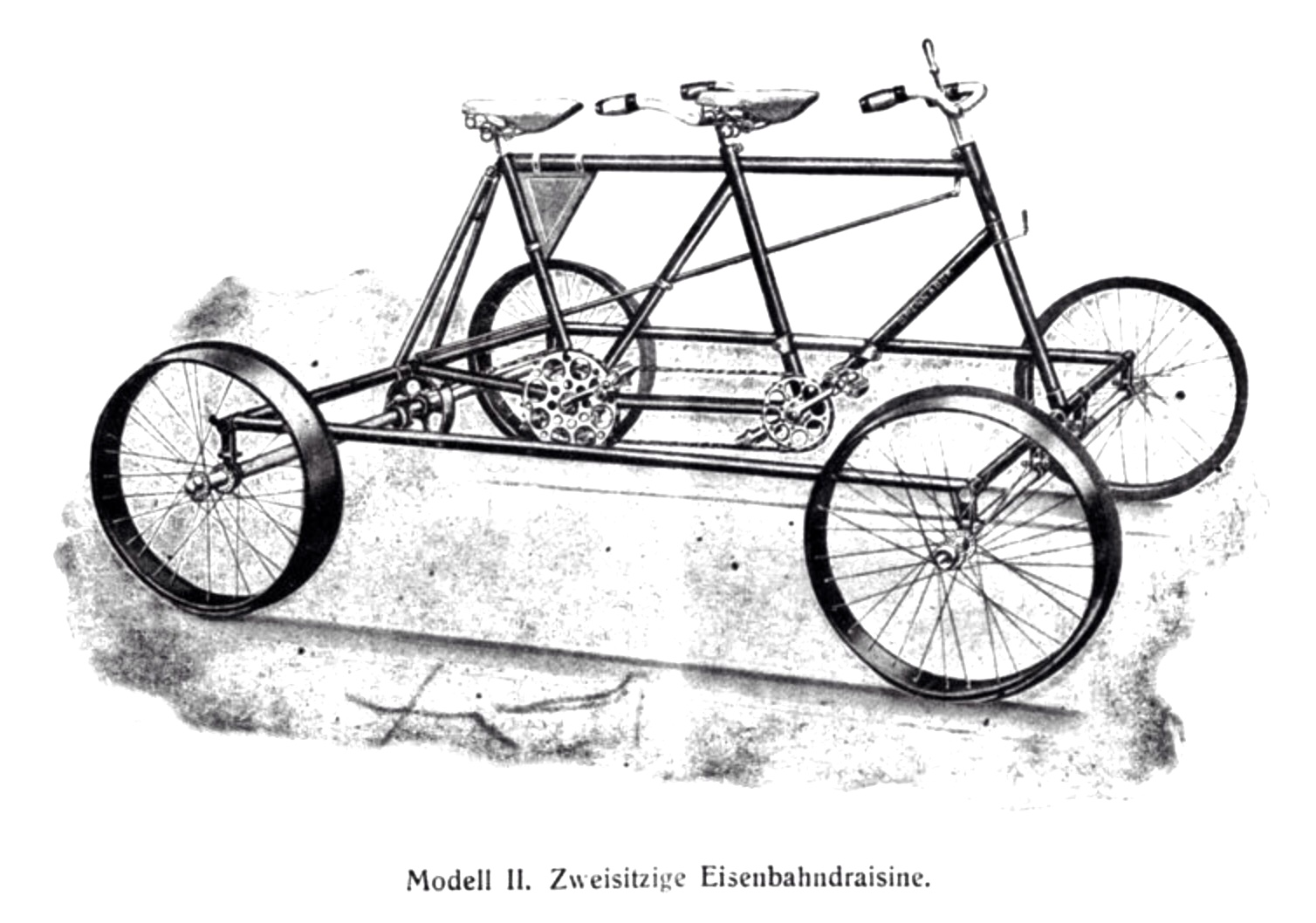
Brennabor Model II railway draisine (1907)

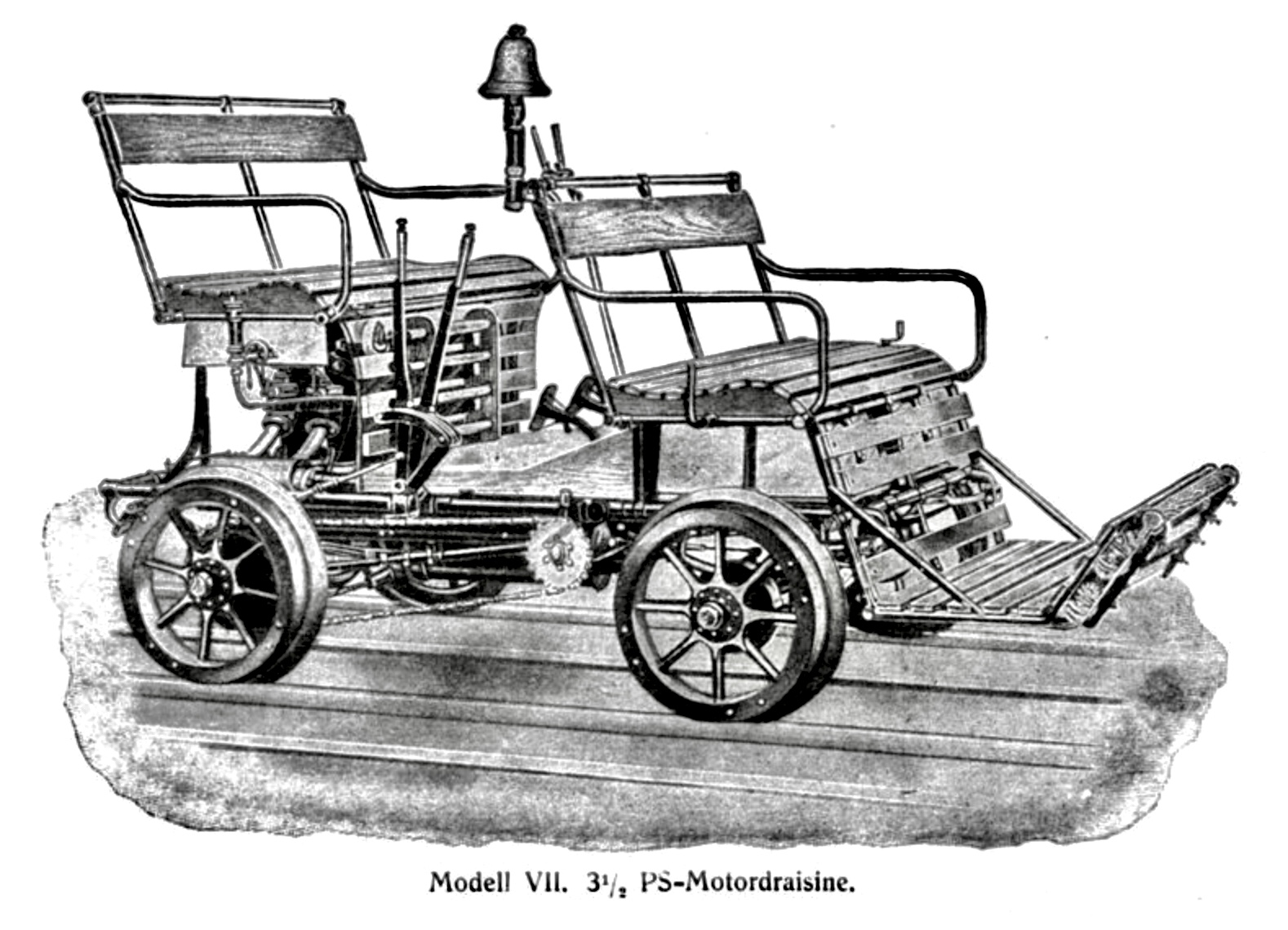
Brennabor Model VII 3.5 hp Motordraisine (1907)

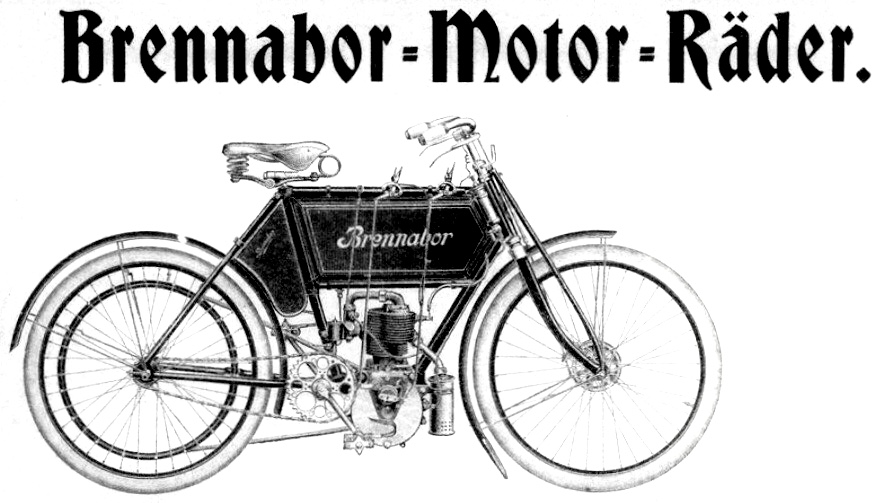
Brennabor Motorcycle (1903)

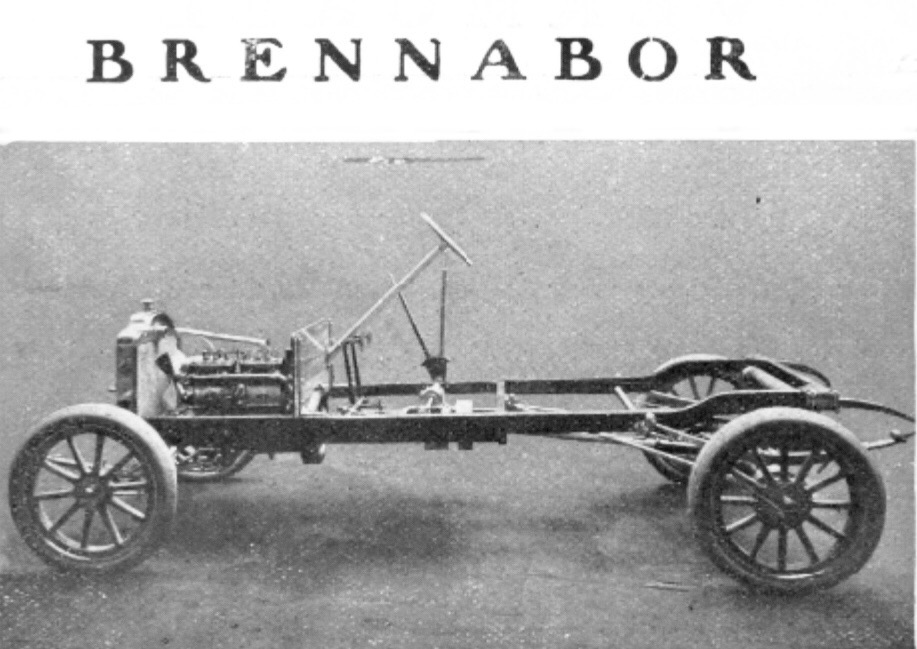
Brennabor Type L4 (C1) Chassis 6-18 hp (1911-1914)

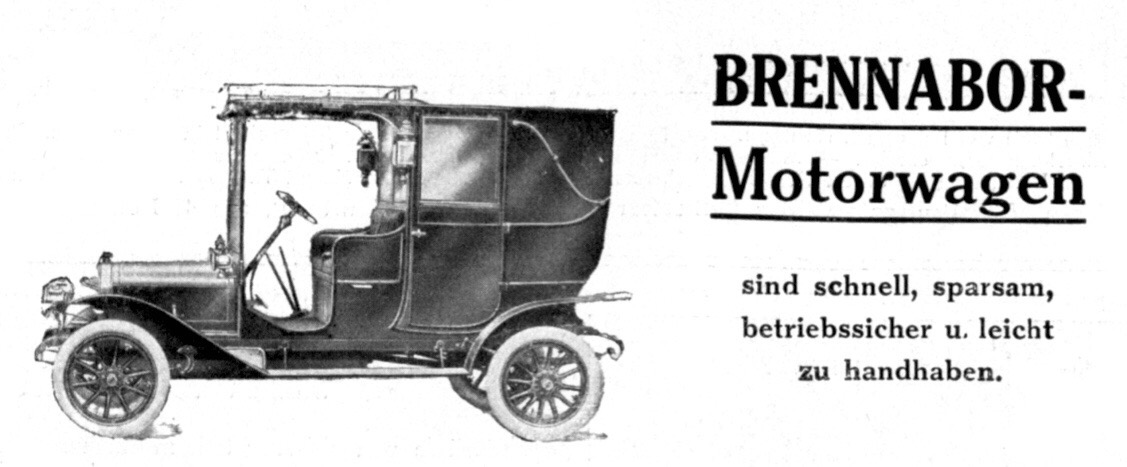
Brennabor (1911)

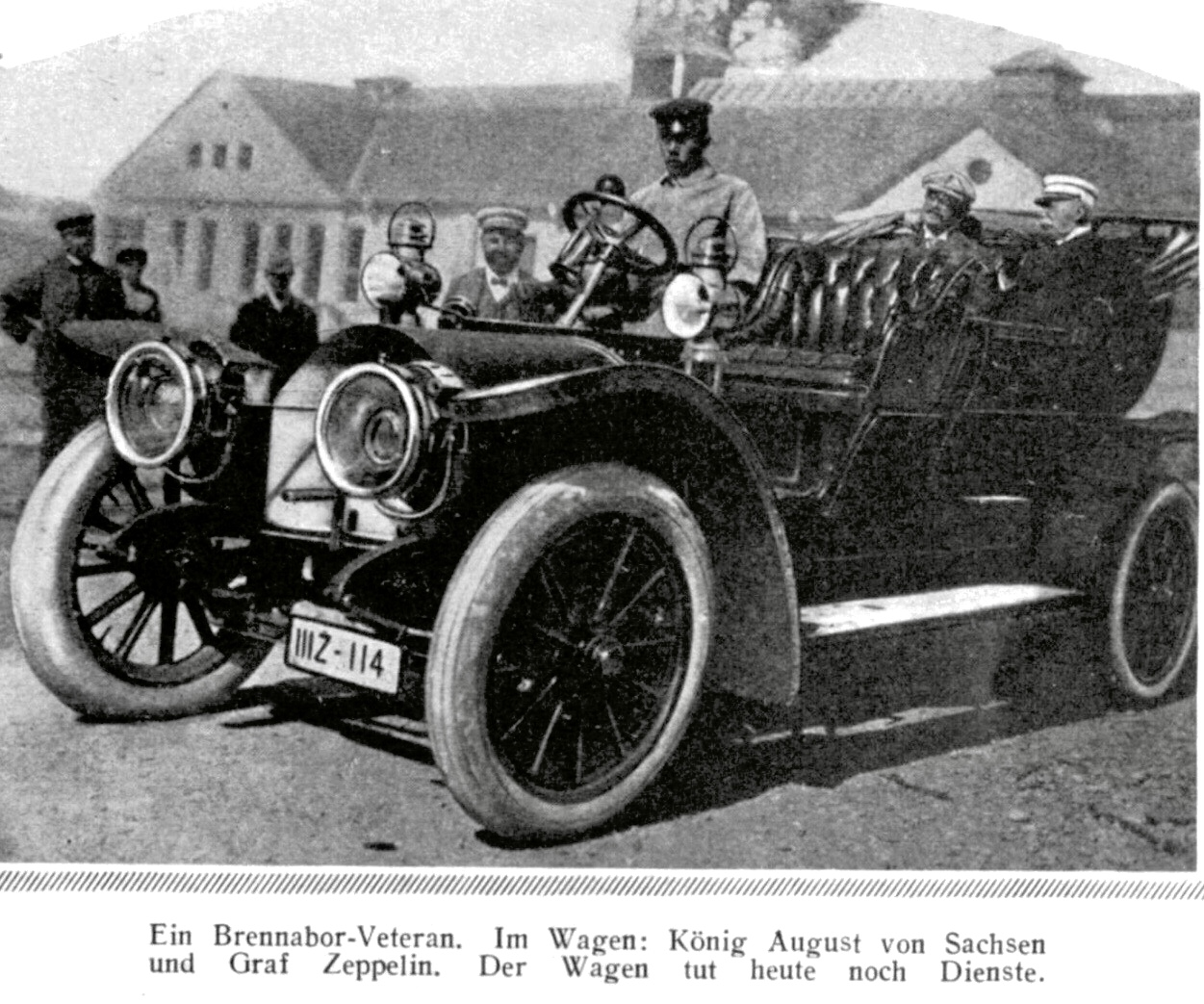
Early Brennabor with Frederick Augustus III of Saxony and Count Ferdinand von Zeppelin in the back seat.

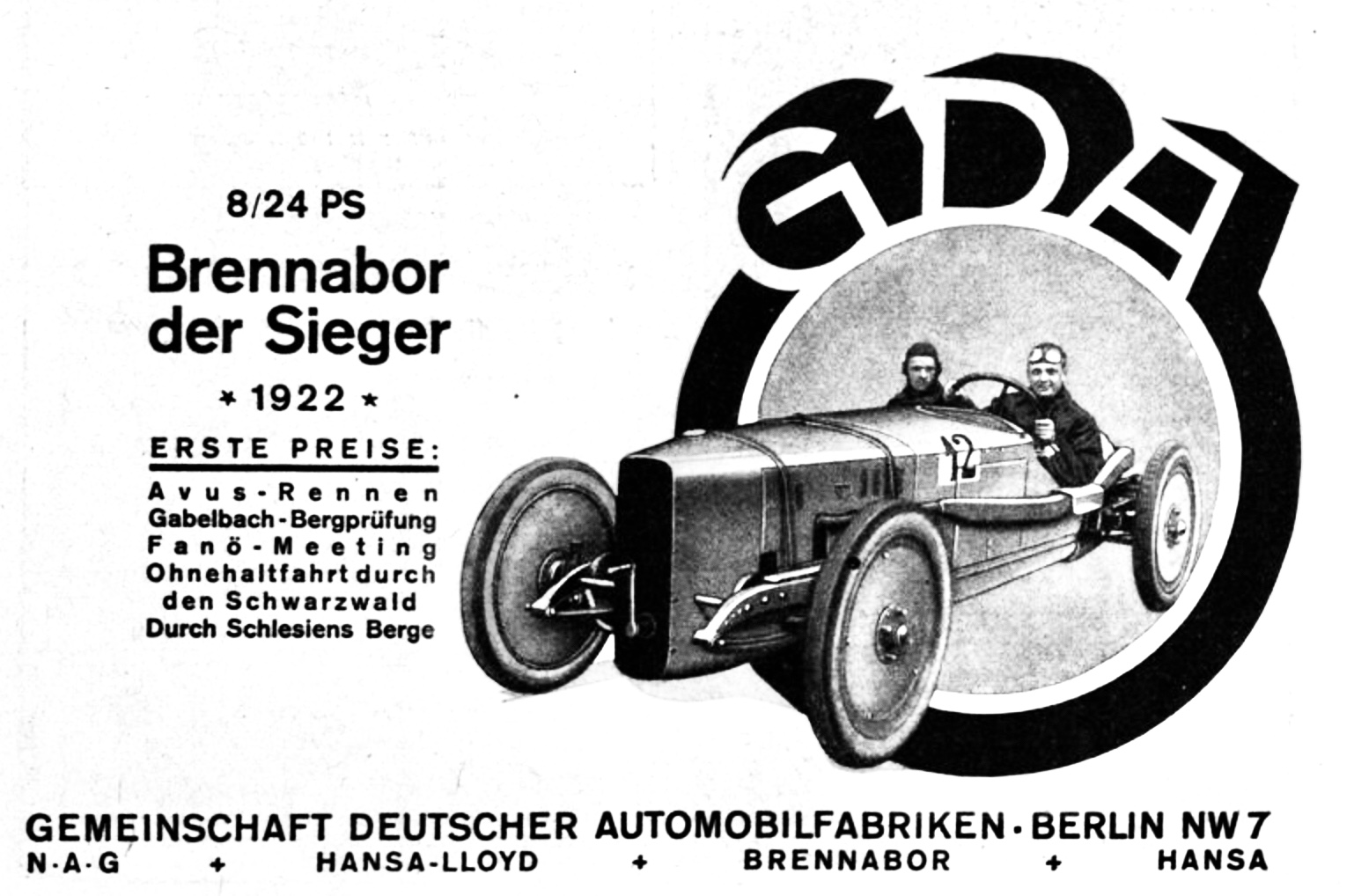
Brennabor Type P 8-24 race car (1922)

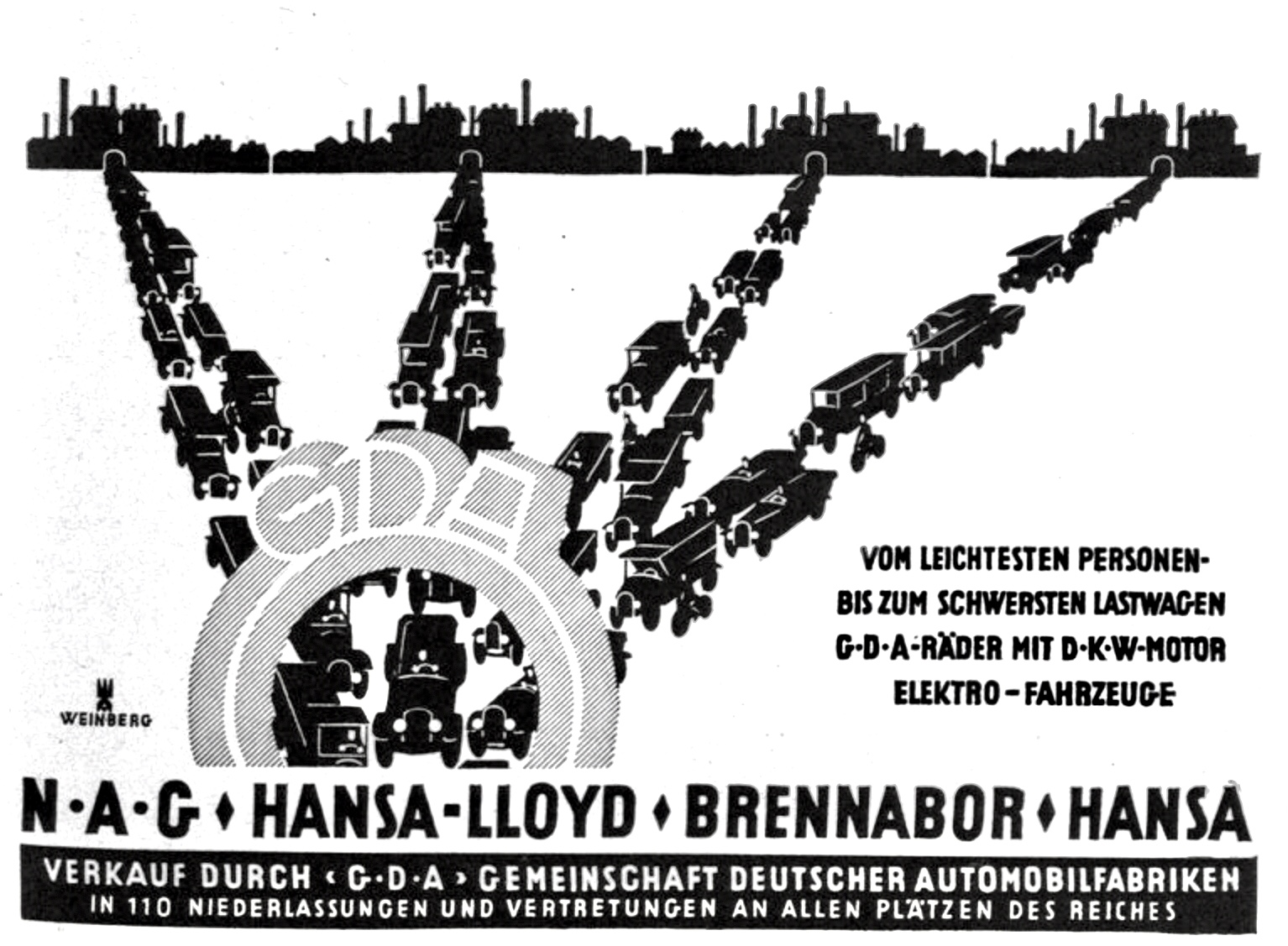
GDA advertisement (1923)

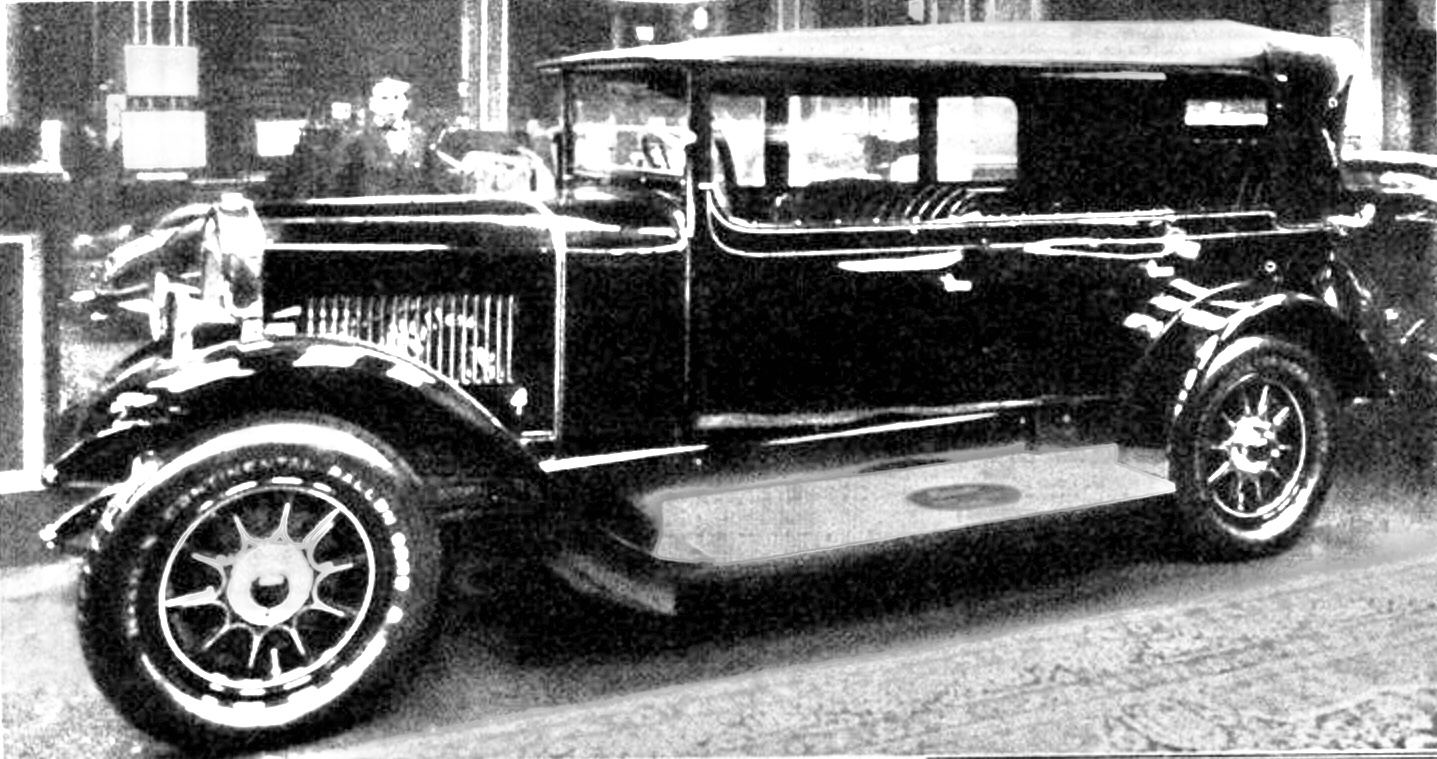
Brennabor Type PW P6 (1926-1927)

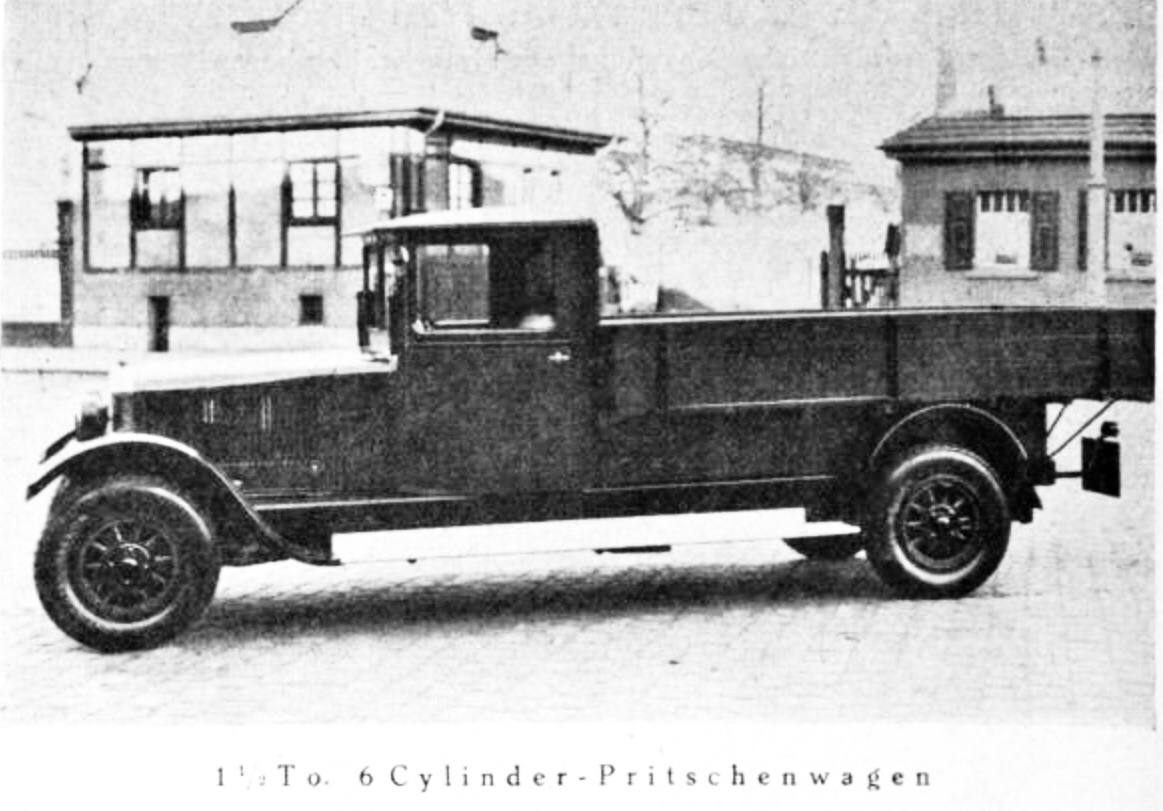
Brennabor 1.5 t six-cylinder pickup truck (1928)

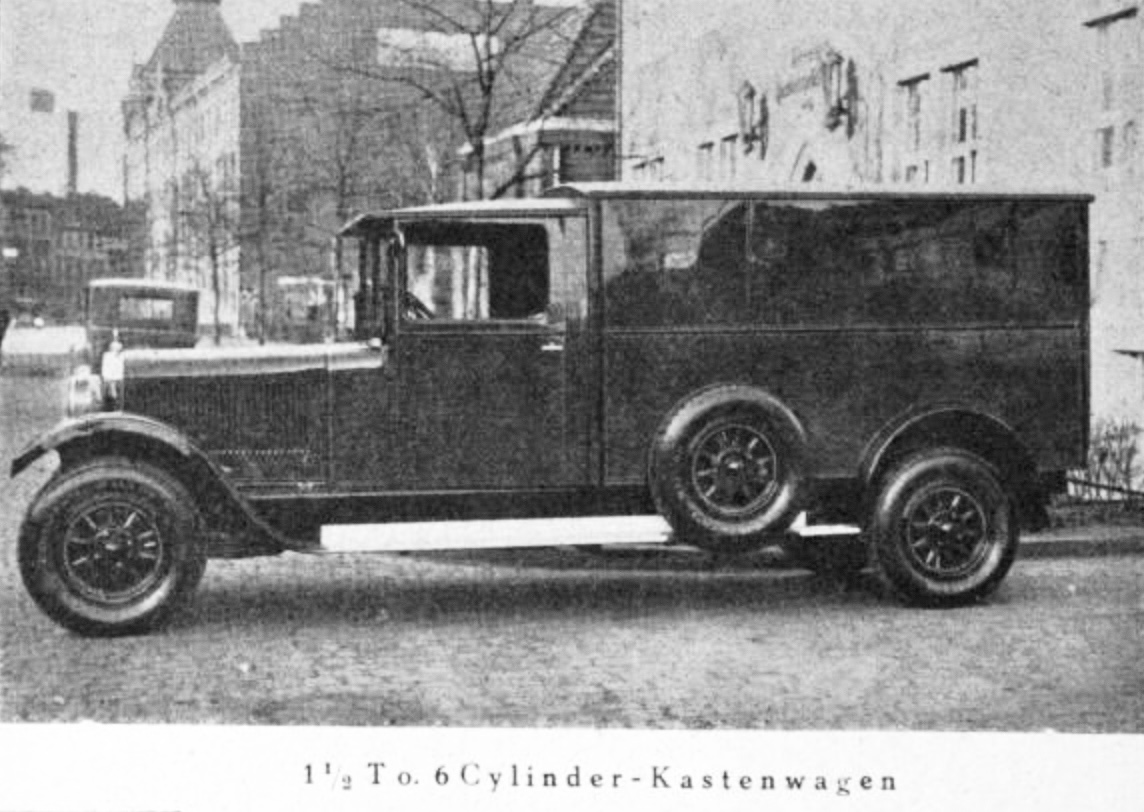
Brennabor 1.5 t six-cylinder van (1928)

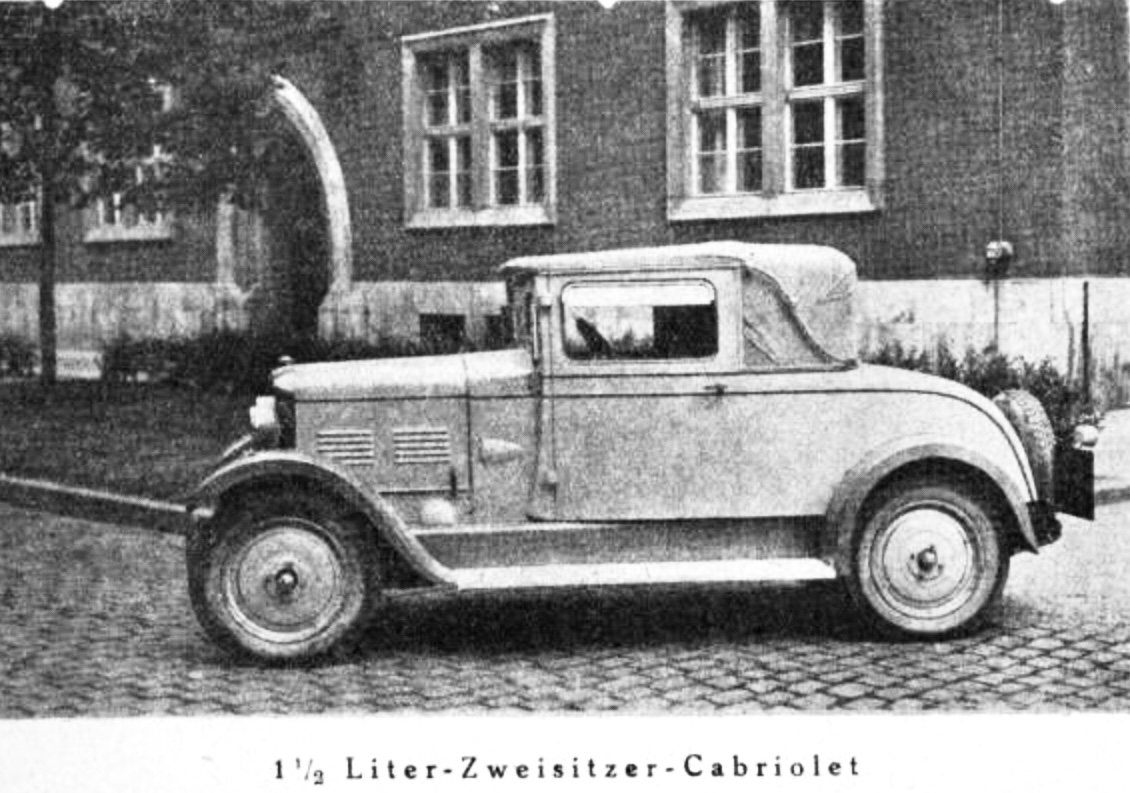
Brennabor Model Z 27 two-seater convertible with 1569 cc (1928-1929)

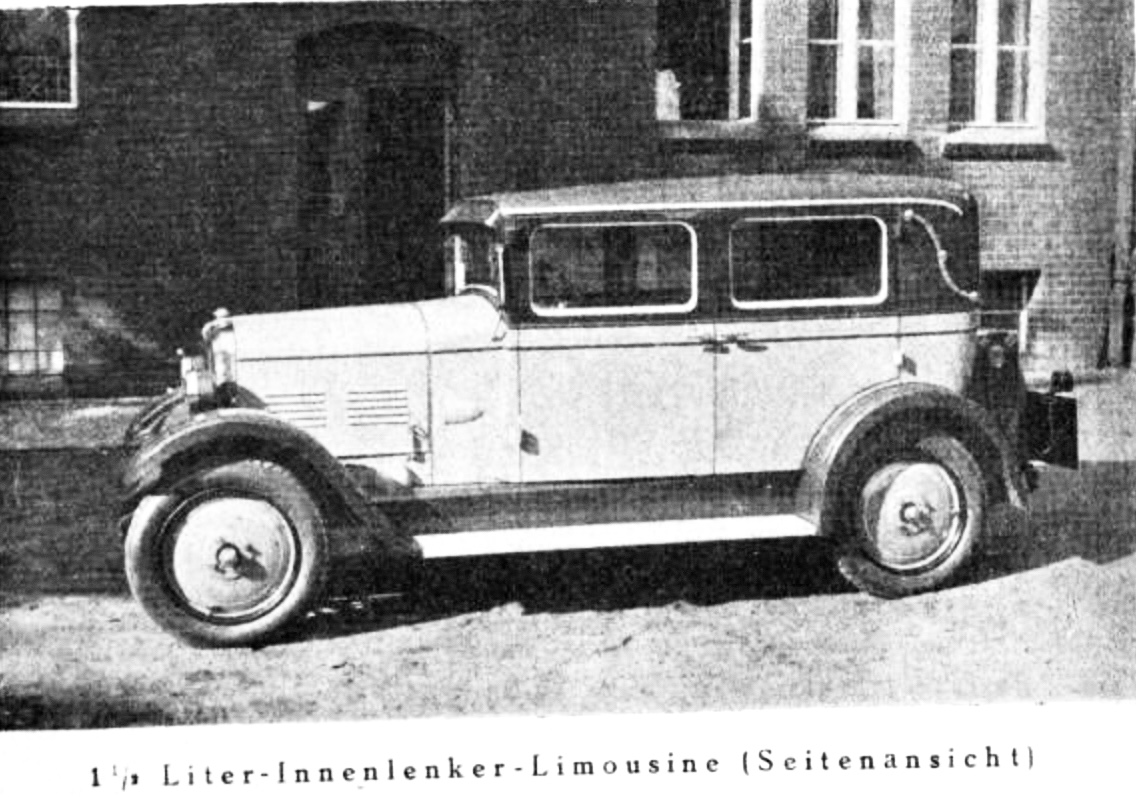
Brennabor Model Z 28 interior steering sedan for four people with 1569 cc (1928-1929)

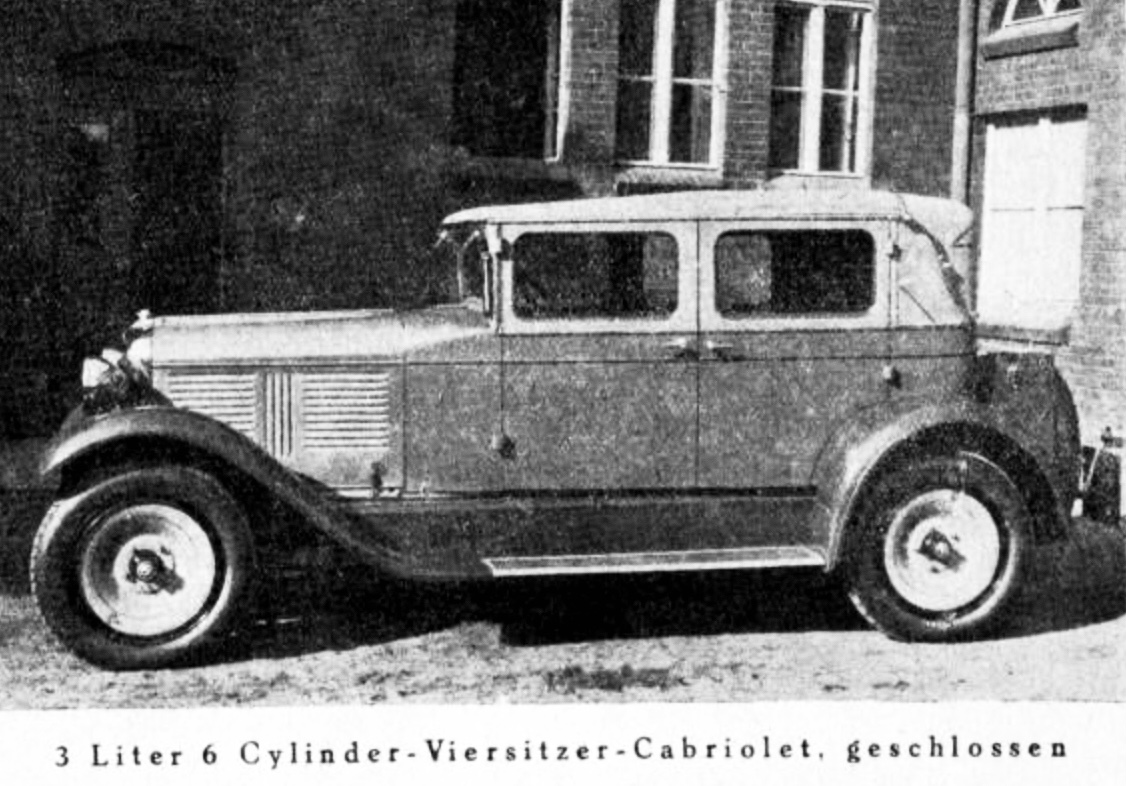
Brennabor Model ASK 29 convertible limousine for four people with six-cylinder 3080 cc engine (1928-1929)

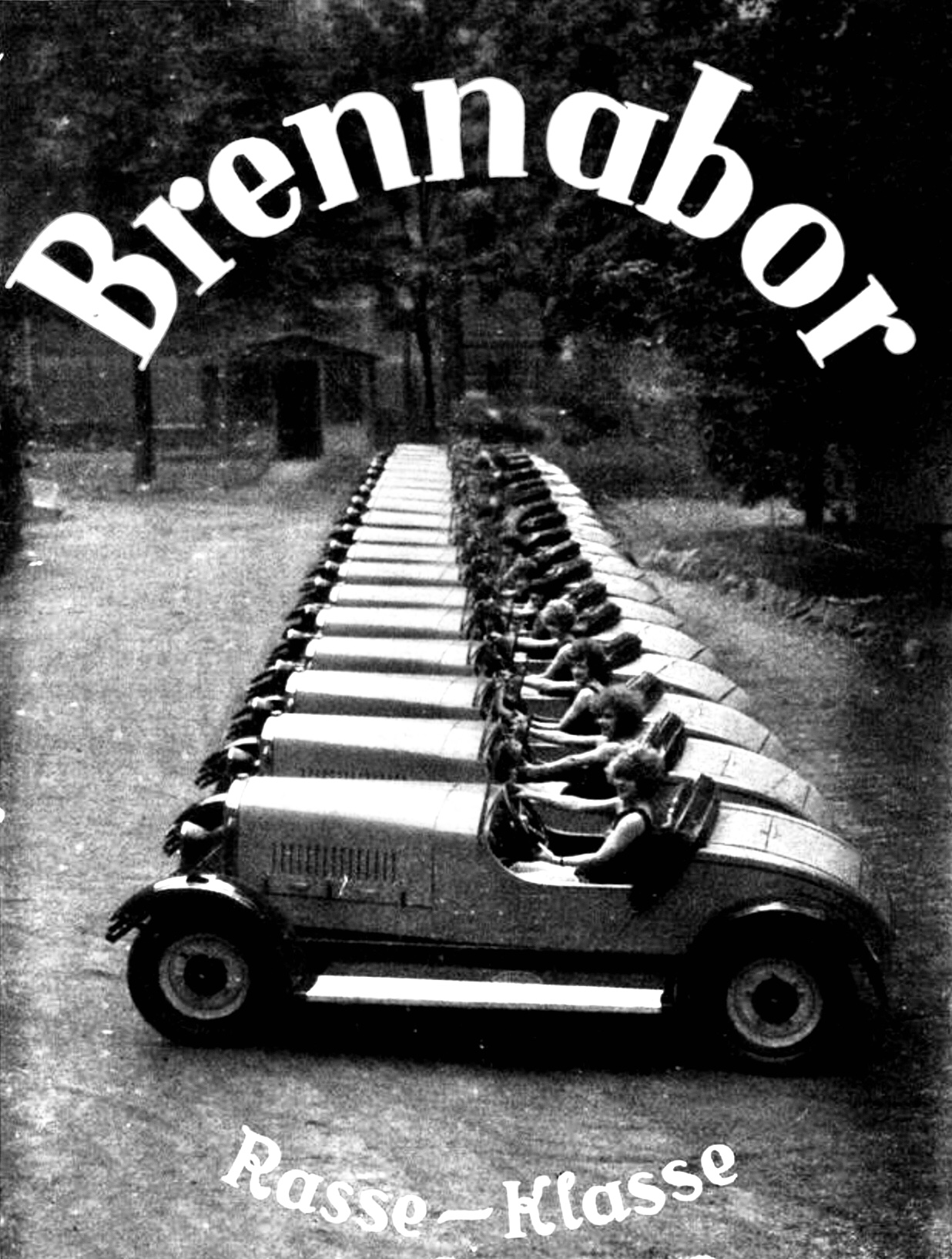
Brennabor Typ R Roadster (1927-1928)

The company was set up in 1871 by three brothers named Adolf, Carl and Hermann Reichstein. The brothers had already been producing basket-work child buggies and children's two-wheelers in 1870, and in 1881 had moved into the booming mainstream bicycle business. From 1892 the bicycles were branded with the Brennabor name.

By the 1930s the company had grown to become Europe's largest produced of infant buggies and was also a leading bicycle producer. Volume production of motor bikes began in 1901, and from 1903 the company was producing, at this stage only to special order, three- and four-wheeled powered vehicles. 1908 saw the beginning of series production of cars, and this was also the year that the company's own racing team began to enjoy worldwide success in motor sport. However, car production was suspended in 1914 with the outbreak of the First World War, while motor bike production was ended in 1916.

For the body construction of the Type F 10/28 hp from the years 1911 to 1914, Brennabor was able to secure the body manufacturer J.W. Utermöhle GmbH from Berlin-Neukölln.

After the war, in 1919, the company presented the Brennabor Typ P, a car targeted at the upper middle classes, and volume production began in 1921. In 1924 Brennabor was employing approximately 6,000 people. During the mid-1920s Brennabor became Germany's largest car producer, and it was still in second place, behind Opel, in 1927/28.

In 1919 the company formed an alliance with two other manufacturers, NAG and Hansa-Lloyd, the resulting tripartite grouping being known as GDA (Gemeinschaft Deutscher Automobilfabriken /Association of German Carmakers). The association lasted until 1928 but never progressed to the point of becoming a formal merger between the member companies.

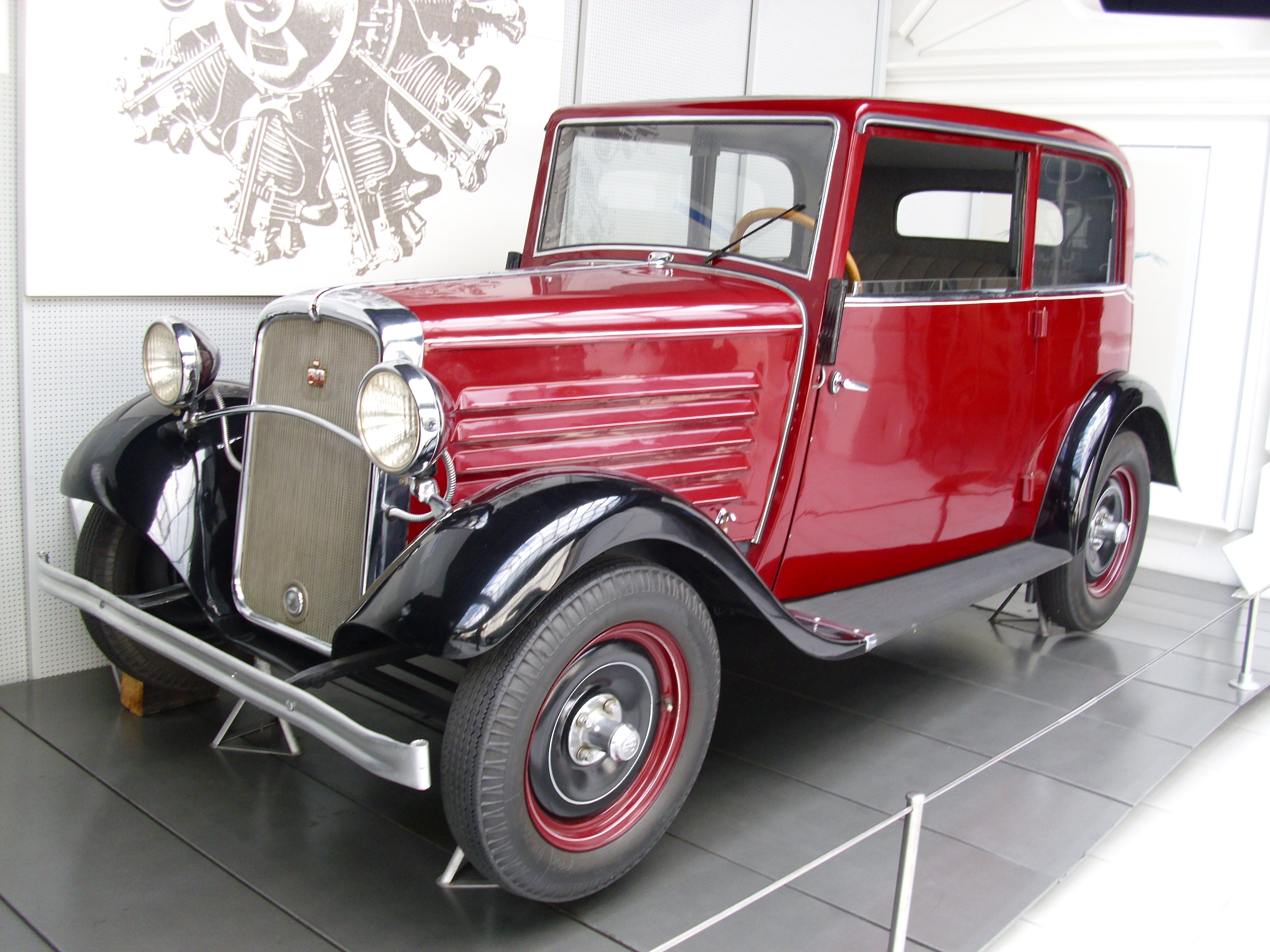
The one-litre Brennabor Type C/D of the early 1930s was not sold in large numbers.

By the end of 1896, 100,000 Brennabor bicycles had already been produced. In 1923, Brennabor produced its 1,000,000th bicycle. The anniversary bicycle is a lightweight road racer of the Type 11.

At the end of 1924, in addition to the 0.75-ton Type 8-24 van, a new 1-ton van was introduced. The technical specifications were announced as follows: length 5250 mm, width 1620 mm, height 2000 mm, cargo bed size 2600 mm x 1500 mm, wheelbase 3865 mm, track width 1350 mm, total weight 1484 kg, top speed 40 km/h.

In 1923/24 Brennabor led the way, as one of the first German auto-makers (along with Opel) to adopt US-style production line techniques. However, Brennabor had no small car model to compete with Opel's Laubfrosch. The German economy was particularly badly hit by the world economic crisis of the 1920s, and the company saw demand and production volumes cut back at the end of the decade.

In the year 1927, the daily production was 30 automobiles and 600 bicycles. With 8,000 employees, the highest production figures were reached in 1927, with 8,200 automobiles, 115,000 bicycles, and 165,000 baby carriages.

The company attempted a comeback in 1931, applying developments in front-wheel drive technology, using the Voran company's patent, but this led only to a prototype based on the company's six-cylinder Juwel 6 model. There was insufficient funding for any progression to volume production of any front-wheel-drive model. 1932 saw an eight-month hiatus in automobile production: production resumed at the end of the autumn, but came to a permanent end in 1933. The company continued as a producer of components and motor bikes until 1945, and also produced armaments during the Second World War, but its history came to an abrupt halt in 1945 when it found itself in the Soviet Occupation Zone and the plant was disassembled.

In the later 1940s the site would later be taken over and used for the creation of a Heavy tractor factory, in which form it continued till the 1960s. Since 1991 the former factory has housed a training centre owned by a subsidiary of the auto-engineering company, ZF Group.

== Brennabor cars ==
Type	Years	Cylinders	Engine capacity	Power output	Maximum speed
Typ A1 3,5/8 PS	1905–1911	2 Reihe	904 cc	6–8 PS (5.9 kW)	50 km/h
Brennaborette 3,5, 4 und 5,5 PS	1907–1912	1 Zyl. mit 3,5 und 4 PS, 2 Zyl. mit 5,5 PS	452 cc	3.5 (2.6 kW), 4 and 5.5 PS	35 km/h
Kleinwagen 6/12 und 6/14 PS	1908–1910	4-cylinder inline		12–14 PS	70 km/h
Typ D 10/20 und 10/24 (Prinz Heinrich Wagen)	1910–1911	4-cylinder inline		20 und 24 PS	80 km/h
Typ B 5/12 PS	1911–1913	4-cylinder inline	1328 cc	12 PS (8.8 kW)	55 km/h
Typ L 6/18 PS	1911–1914	4-cylinder inline	1592 cc	18 PS (13.2 kW)	60 km/h
Typ C 6/18 PS	1910–1912	4-cylinder inline		18 PS	65 km/h
Typ G 8/22 PS	1910–1914	4-cylinder inline	2025 cc	22 PS (16.2 kW)	70 km/h
Typ F 10/28 PS	1911–1914	4-cylinder inline	2476 cc	28 PS (20.6 kW)	80 km/h
Typ M 6/16 PS	1914	4-cylinder inline	1453 cc	16 PS (11.8 kW)	70 km/h
Typ P 8/24 PS	1919–1925	4-cylinder inline	2091 cc	24 PS (17.7 kW)	65 km/h
Typ S 6/20 PS	1922–1925	4-cylinder inline	1569 cc	20 PS (14.7 kW)	70 km/h
Typ R 6/25 PS	1925–1928	4-cylinder inline	1569 cc	25 PS (18.4 kW)	70 km/h
Typ P 8/32 PS	1925–1927	4-cylinder inline	2091 cc	27 PS (19.9 kW)	75 km/h
Typ AL 10/45 PS	1927–1930	6-cylinder inline	2547 cc	45 PS (33 kW)	70 km/h
Typ Z 6/25 PS	1927–1929	4-cylinder inline	1569 cc	25 PS (18.4 kW)	70 km/h
Typ AK 10/45 PS	1927–1930	6-cylinder inline	2547 cc	45 PS (33 kW)	85 km/h
Typ ASK / Typ AFK 12/55 PS	1928–1932	6-cylinder inline	3080 cc	55 PS (40 kW)	90 km/h
Typ ASL / Typ AFL 12/55 PS	1928–1932	6-cylinder inline	3080 cc	55 PS (40 kW)	85 km/h
Ideal 7/30 PS	1929–1933	4-cylinder inline	1640 cc	30 PS (22 kW)	75 km/h
Juwel 6 10/45 PS	1929–1932	6-cylinder inline	2460 cc	45 PS (33 kW)	85 km/h
Juwel 8 14/60 und 14/65 PS	1930–1932	8-cylinder inline	3417 cc	60 PS (44 kW)	100 km/h
Juwel Front 10/45 PS	Prototype 1931	6-cylinder inline	2460 cc	45 PS	85 km/h
Typ C 4/20	1931–1933	4-cylinder inline	995 cc	20 PS (14.7 kW)	75 km/h
Ideal extra 7/30 PS	1930–1933	4-cylinder inline	1640 cc	30 PS (22 kW)	75 km/h
Typ D 4/22	1933	4-cylinder inline	995 cc	22 PS (16.2 kW)	75 km/h
Typ E 8/38 PS	1933	6-cylinder inline	1957 cc	38 PS (27.9 kW)	80 km/h
Typ F 10/45 PS	1933	6-cylinder inline	2460 cc	45 PS (33 kW)	90 km/h
