= Brennabor Typ E =

The 2 Litre Brennabor Typ E is a car manufactured, briefly, by Brennabor in 1933 as a successor to the company's Typ B “Juwel 6.

The Typ E was powered by a 6-cylinder 2-litre side-valve engine, mounted ahead of the driver and delivering 38 hp at 3,200 rpm. Power was delivered to the rear wheels through a single-plate dry clutch and a four-speed gear box controlled using a centrally positioned floor-mounted gear stick. A freewheel device within the clutch was offered as an option.

The car sat on a U-profile pressed steel chassis with rigid axles and semi-eliptical leaf springing. It was offered only as a four-door sedan/saloon. The mechanically linked foot brake operated directly on all four wheels, while the handbrake operated on the rear wheels.

At the same time, the company launched the 2.5-litre Brennabor Typ F. This was similar in most respects, but retained the larger 2460 cc engine from the Typ B “Juwel 6. Thus equipped, the Type F provided 45 hp of output.

1933 was a year of continuing economic difficulty for the German economy. Brennabor's output had continued to slide, from 1,655 units the equivalent of 3.0% of the German passenger car market in 1931, to 522 units, equivalent to a market share of 1.3% in 1932. By the end of 1933 the company had abandoned automobile production in order to focus on light-weight motor bikes. When automobile production was suspended, it is estimated that the combined output of Typ Es and Typ Fs amounted to approximately 200 cars.

== Technical data ==
Type	E 2 Liter	F 2,5 Liter
Production year	1933	1933
Bodies	4-door “limousine” saloon/sedan	4-door “limousine saloon/sedan
Motor	6 cyl. In-line 4-stroke	6 cyl. In-line 4-stroke
Valvegear	side (SV)	side (SV)
Bore x stroke	66 mm × 96 mm	74 mm × 96 mm
Engine capacity	1957 cc	2460 cc
Power output German hp (PS)	38	45
Power output (kW)	28	33
at rpm	3200	3200
Compression ratio	5.8 : 1	5.8 : 1
Fuel consumption litres per 100 km	12 L / 100 km	13 L / 100 km
Transmission	4-speed manual with central floor-mounted lever freewheel optional	4-speed manual with central floor-mounted lever freewheel optional
Top speed	85 km/h (53 mph)	85 km/h (53 mph)
Unladen weight	1380 kg	1380 kg
Gross laden weight	1880 kg	1880 kg
Electrical system	6 Volt	6 Volt
Length	4450 mm	4450 mm
Width	1730 mm	1730 mm
Height	1700 mm	1700 mm
Wheelbase	3050 mm	3050 mm
Track front / back	1420 mm / 1420 mm	1420 mm / 1420 mm
Tires	5,25-17" Aero	5,25-17" Aero

== Sources ==
- Oswald, Werner: Deutsche Autos 1920–1945. Motorbuch Verlag Stuttgart, 10. Auflage (1996), ISBN 3-87943-519-7
- Oswald, Werner (2001). Deutsche Autos 1920-1945, Band (vol) 2 (in German). Motorbuch Verlag. ISBN 3-613-02170-6.
