= Brennabor Typ S =

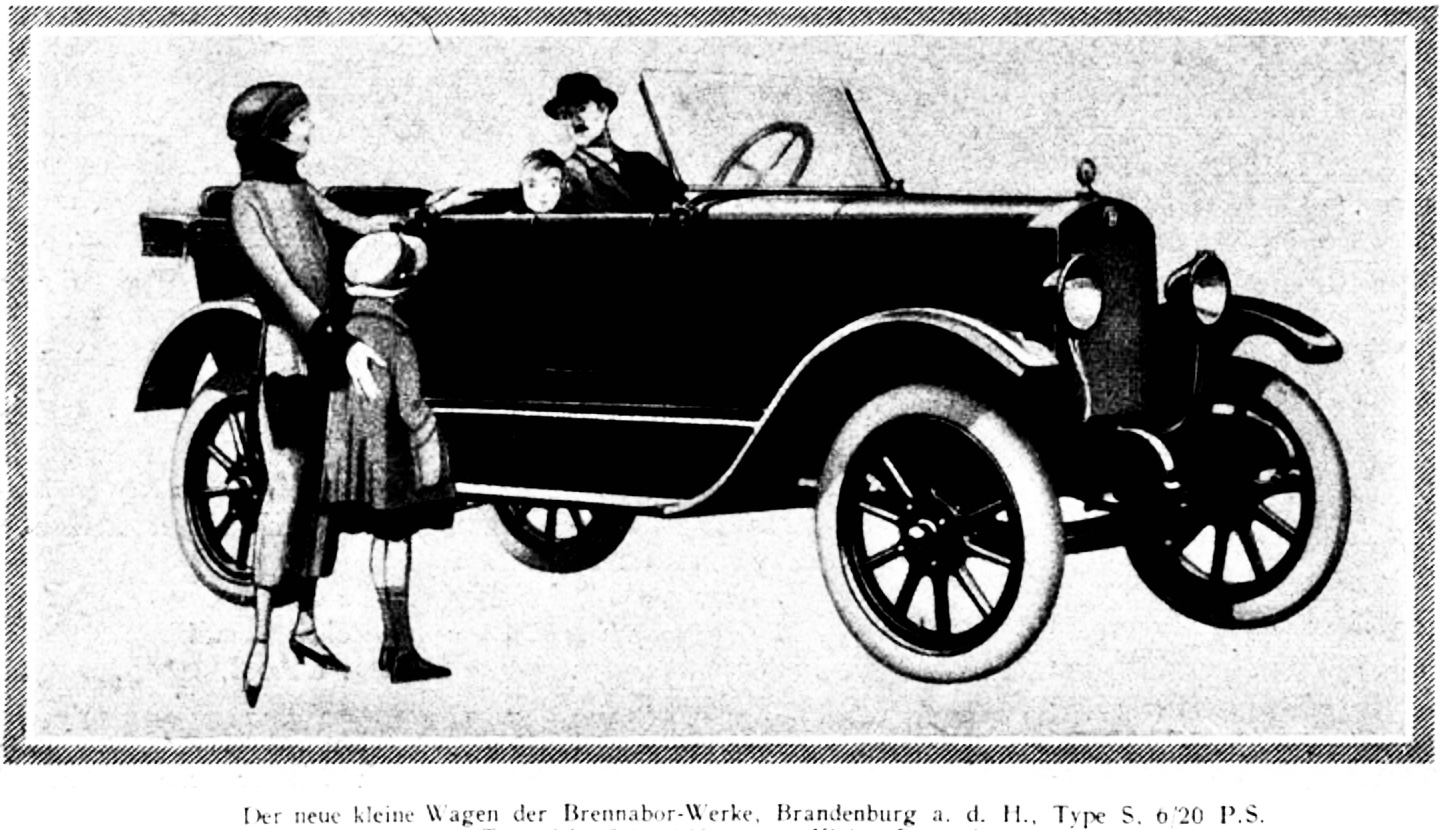
Brennabor Type S 6-20 (1922-1925)

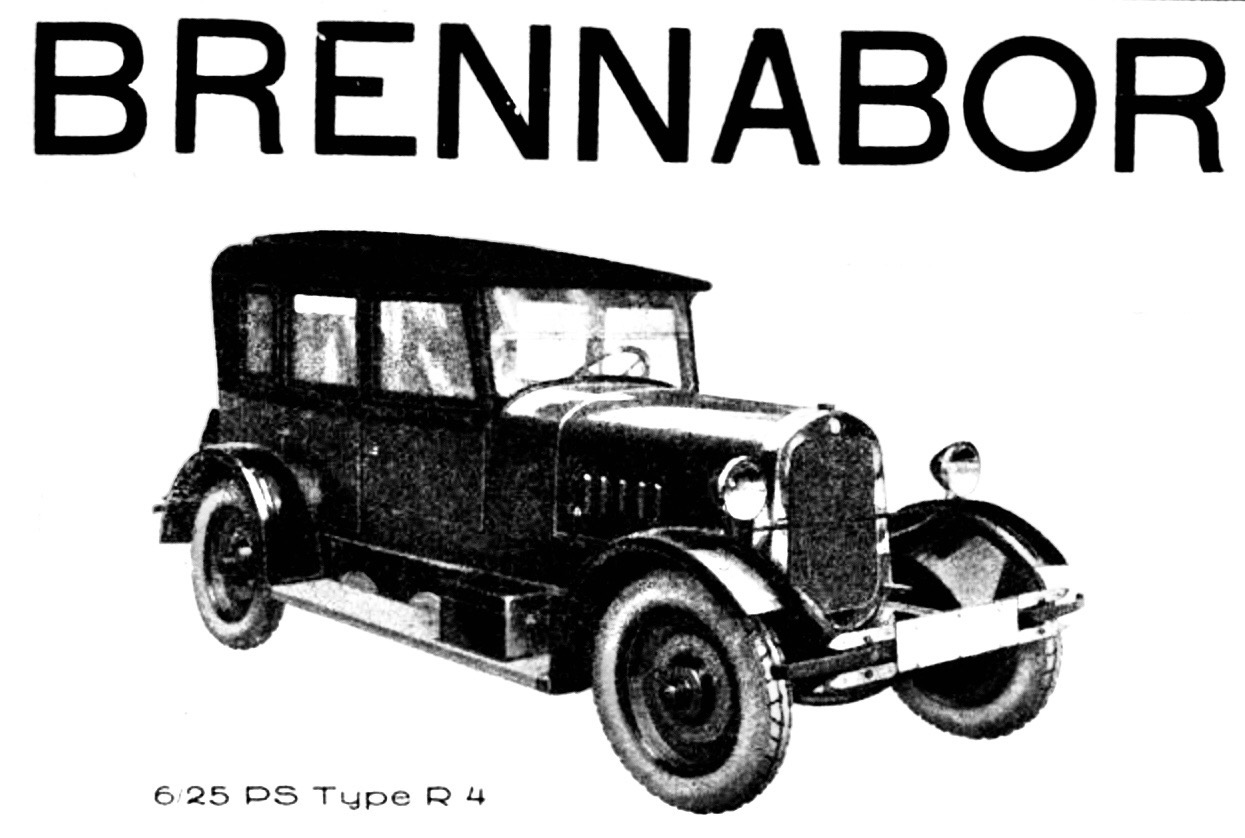
Brennabor Type R 6-25 (1925-1928)

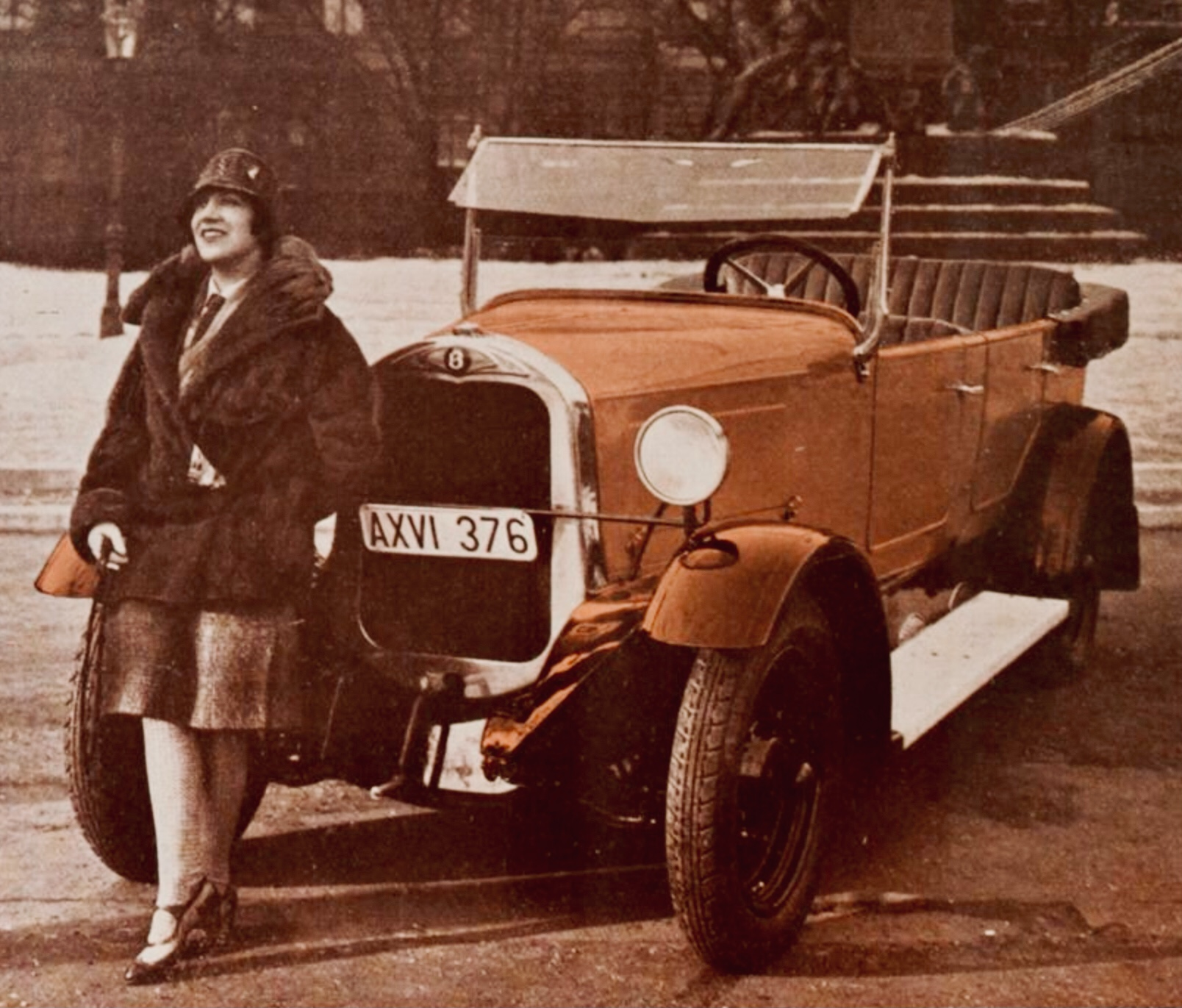
Brennabor Type R 6-25 (1928)

The Brennabor Typ S, launched in 1922, was a car introduced by the Brennabor company in order to complement their larger Typ P model. In 1925 it was replaced by the Brennabor Typ R which was essentially an updated version of the same model.

The Typ S was powered by a 4-cylinder side-valve engine of 1.57 litres (96 in^{3}), mounted ahead of the driver and delivering 20 horsepower (15 kW) at 2,200 rpm. Power was delivered to the rear wheels through a single-plate dry clutch and a three-speed gear box controlled with centrally positioned floor-mounted gear stick.

The car sat on a U-profile pressed-steel chassis with rigid axles and semi-elliptical leaf springing. In 1922 it was offered only as an open-topped four-seater. The mechanically linked foot and hand brakes both operated directly against the rear wheels.

By 1925 Brennabor had produced approximately 3,000 Typ Ss

In 1925 the company updated its ranges, and the Brennabor Typ S found itself replaced by the Brennabor Typ R. The engine configuration and size were unchanged, but claimed power increased to 25 horsepower (19 kW) at 2,800 rpm. The car was slightly longer and wider (though also slightly lower) than its predecessor and a range of different body types was offered in addition to the open-topped four-seater. A three-door Phaeton model was designated the R4, and a two-door sedan was known as the R8. A two-door "roadster" and a "droschke-laundaulet" were also listed.

The Type R appeared at a time when the German economy was recovering, at least for the time being, from the most savage predations of the post war slump, and by 1928, after three years in production, the company had produced approximately 20,000 Typ Rs.

== Technical details ==
Type	S (6/20 PS) (6 tax horsepower / 20 German hp)	R (6/25 PS) (6 tax horsepower / 25 German hp)
Years in production	1922–1925	1925–1928
Bodies	Open 4-seater,	Open 4-seater, 2-door roadster/sedan/cabriolet, 4-door landaulet
Motor	4 cyl. In-line 4-stroke	4 cyl. In-line 4-stroke
Valvegear	side (SV)	side (SV)
Bore x stroke	70 mm (2.8 in) x 102 mm	70 mm (2.8 in) x 102 mm
capacity	1569 cc	1569 cc
Power (PS / German hp)	20 PS (15 kW; 20 hp)	20 PS (15 kW; 20 hp)
at rpm (1/min.)	2,200	2,800
Torque	83.4 N⋅m (62 lb⋅ft)	83.4 N⋅m (62 lb⋅ft)
at rpm (1/min.)	800	800
Compression ratio	5.25 : 1	5.25 : 1
fuel consumption	10.5 L / 100 km	10.5 L / 100 km
Gears	3-speed with central floor-mounted lever	3-speed with central floor-mounted lever
Top speed	70 km/h (43 mph)	70 km/h (43 mph)
Unladen weight	ca. 950 kg (2,094 lb)	1050 – 1,170 kg (2,579 lb)
Gross loaded weight	1500 – 1,620 kg (3,571 lb)	ca. 1,500 kg (3,307 lb)
Electrical system	6 Volt	6 Volt
Length	3,900 mm (153.5 in)	4,120 mm (162.2 in)
Width	1,470 mm (57.9 in)	1,560 mm (61.4 in)
Height	1,900 mm (74.8 in)	1,840 mm (72.4 in)
Wheel base	2,610 mm (102.8 in)	2,710 mm (106.7 in)
Track front / back	1280 mm / 1280 mm	1280 mm / 1280 mm
Tires	730 x 130 HD or 28" x 4,95" HD or 27" x 4,40" ND	730 x 130 HD or 28" x 4,95" HD or 27" x 4,40" ND

== Sources ==
- Werner Oswald: Deutsche Autos 1920–1945. Motorbuch Verlag Stuttgart, 10. Auflage (1996), ISBN 3-87943-519-7
