= Brennabor Typ P =

First car introduced by Brennabor

The Brennabor Typ P, launched in 1919, is the first car introduced by the Brennabor company after the First World War. For a few years in the early 1920s this middle market model, with production reaching 100 units per day just for the domestic market, took the company to the top of the German auto-sales charts.

The car was powered by a 4-cylinder side-valve engine of 2.1 litres, mounted ahead of the driver and delivering 24 hp at 2,400 rpm. Power was delivered to the rear wheels through an asbestos lined clutch and a four-speed gear box controlled with a gear lever mounted outside the passenger area, directly to the right of the driver's seat. (As was normal at this time, the driver sat on the right-hand side of the car.)

The car sat on a U-profile pressed steel chassis with rigid axles and semi-elliptical leaf springing. It came as a P6 version with a six-seater open-topped body or as a P11, featuring a more sporty open-topped four-seater body. The mechanically linked foot brake operated on the drive shaft, while the hand brake operated directly against the rear wheels.

A successor model, the Brennabor Typ PW, appeared in 1925. This shared the 2.1-litre engine of the earlier Typ P, but claimed maximum power was increased to 32 hp, achieved, now, at 2,600 rpm. The gear lever was relocated from the right hand edge of the car to a central floor-mounted position, which necessitated changing gear with the left hand, since the driver continued to be conventionally positioned on the right-hand side of the car. The wheelbase was unchanged, but the standard bodies were nevertheless a little longer than on the previous model.

A third body style joined the existing two, as the Typ P was now offered, as the P15, with a four-door body.

Taking the Typ P and the Typ PW together, by 1927 approximately 10,000 of the Brennabor Typ P models had been produced.

== Technical Details ==
Typ	P (8/24 PS) (Tax hp/German hp))	PW (8/32 PS) (Tax hp/German hp))
Production years	1919 - 1925	1925 - 1927
Bodies	Open 4-seater, Open 6-seater	Open 4-seater, Open 6-seater, 4-door sedan
Motor	4 cyl. In-line 4-stroke	4 cyl. In-line 4-stroke
Valvegear	side (SV)	side (SV)
Bore x stroke	80 mm x 104 mm	80 mm x 104 mm
capacity	2091 cm^{3}	2091 cm^{3}
Power (PS / German hp)	24	27
Power (kW)	17.6	19.9
at rpm (1/min.)	2,400	2,600
Compression ratio		4.5 : 1
fuel consumption	12 L / 100 km	12 L / 100 km
Gears	4-speed with externally mounted lever	4-speed with central floor-mounted lever
Top speed	65 km/h (40 mph)	75 km/h (47 mph)
Unladen weight	ca. 1400 kg	1450 – 1550 kg
Gross loaded weight	ca. 2150 kg	2200 – 2300 kg
Electrical system	12 Volt	12 Volt
Length	4400 mm	4600 mm
Width	1650 mm	1650 mm
Height	2000 mm	2000 mm
Wheel base	3165 mm	3165 mm
Track front / back	1350 mm / 1350 mm	1350 mm / 1350 mm
Tires	820 x 120 HD	820 x 120 HD or 30" x 5,77" ND

== Sources ==
- Oswald, Werner: Deutsche Autos 1920–1945, Motorbuch Verlag Stuttgart, 10. Auflage (1996), ISBN 3-87943-519-7
