= Brennabor Typ B =

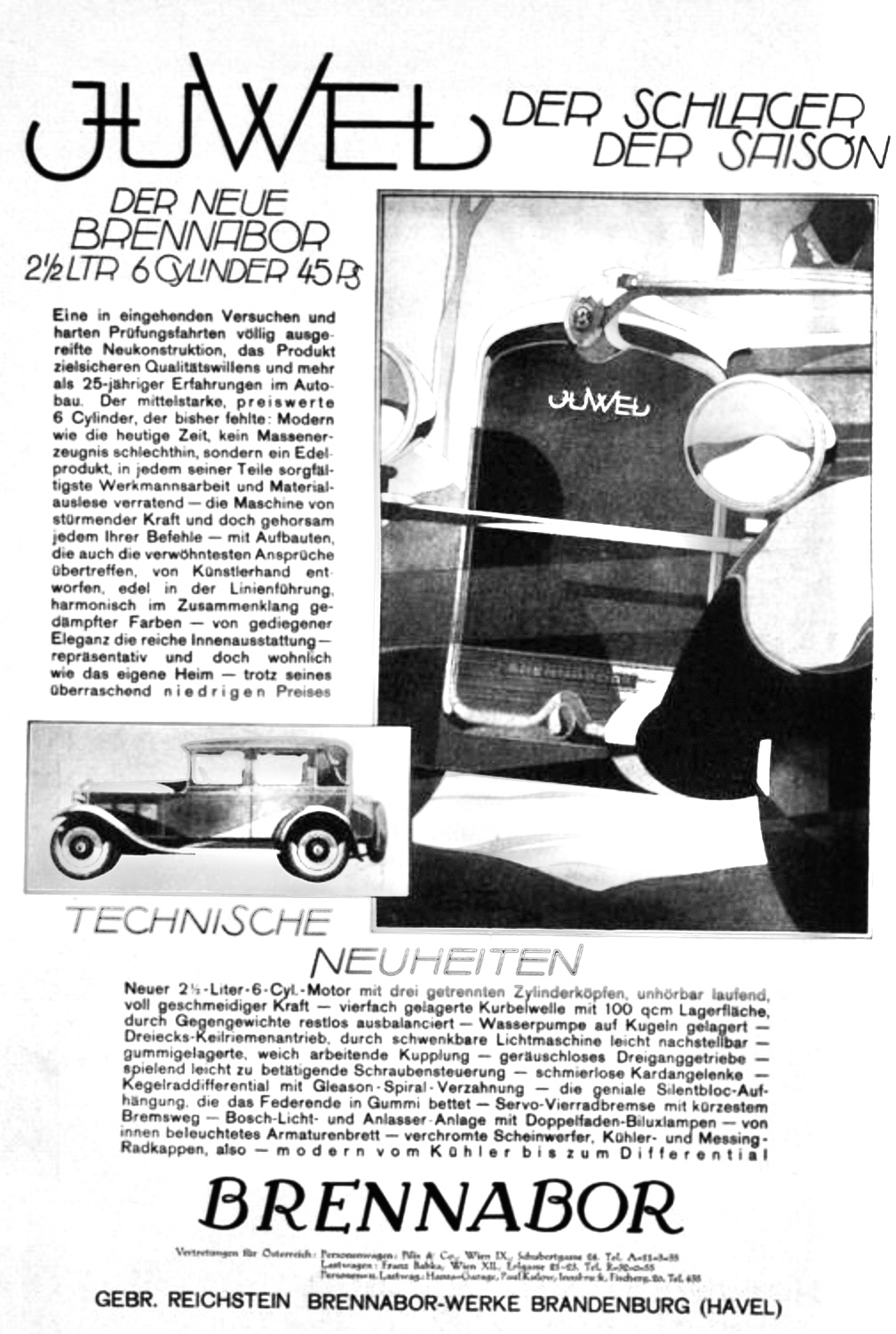
Brennabor Typ B “Juwel 6” advertisement (1929-1932)

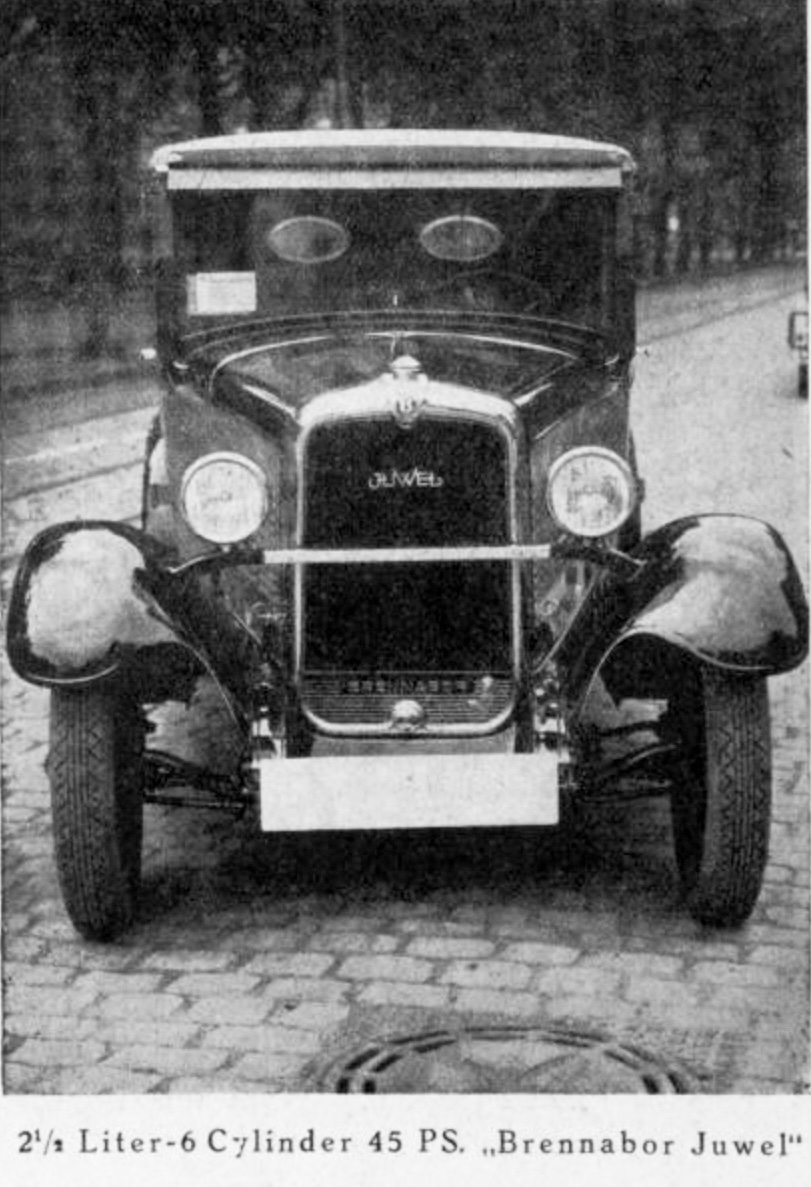
Brennabor Typ B “Juwel 6” (1929-1932)

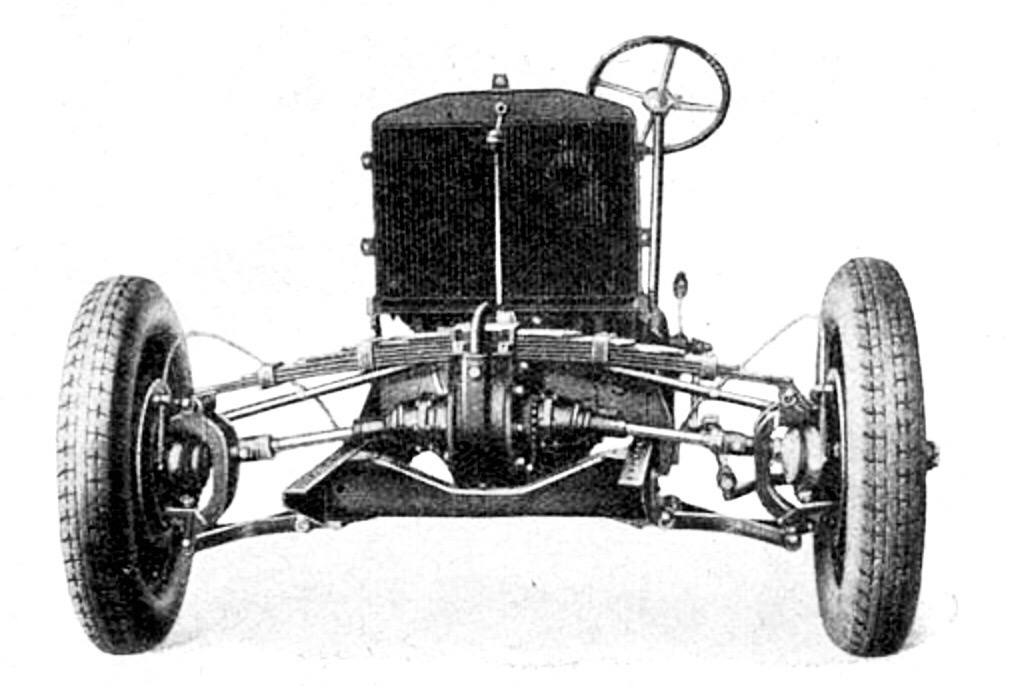
Brennabor Typ B “Juwel 6” front axle

The Brennabor Typ B “Juwel 6” is a six-cylinder automobile introduced by the Brennabor company in 1929 as a successor to the des Brennabor Typ A.

The Juwel 6 was powered by a newly developed 6-cylinder side-valve engine of 2.46 litres, mounted ahead of the driver and delivering 45 hp at 3,200 rpm. The larger 3.1-litre 55 hp engine first seen on the Typs ASK / ALK, could be specified as an option. Power was delivered to the rear wheels through a single plate dry clutch and a three-speed gear box controlled using a centrally positioned floor-mounted gear stick.

The car sat on a U-profile pressed steel chassis with rigid axles and semi-elliptical leaf springing. It was offered only as a four-door sedan/saloon or soft/open topped sedan/saloon. A two-door full cabriolet was also offered. The mechanically linked foot brake operated directly on all four wheels, while the handbrake operated on the rear wheels.

As with the Typ A which it replaced, the Juwel 6 could be ordered with two lengths of chassis. The standard version was 4050 mm long, while the longer version, known as the Juwel 6 Extra, was 4150 mm long.

The Juwel 6 was offered till 1932, by which time approximately 3,000 had been produced. A front-wheel drive replacement had been identified in 1931, but for cost reasons this never passed beyond the prototype phase, though it may have provided inspiration for the Audi Front launched by a leading competitor two years later in 1933. Brennabor's own successors for the Juwel 6 appeared in the form of the Brennabors Typ E and Typ F, also in 1933; but it was short-lived, since 1933 was the year when the company finally withdrew from automobile production.

== Technical data ==
Type	Juwel 6 (10/45 PS) (10 tax horsepower / 45 German hp)	Juwel 6 Extra (10/45 PS) (10 tax horsepower / 45 German hp)
Production years	1929 - 1932	1929 - 1932
Bodies	4-door saloon/sedan soft/open-topped saloon/sedan 2-door cabriolet	4-door saloon/sedan soft/open-topped saloon/sedan 2-door cabriolet
Motor	6 cyl. In-line 4-stroke	6 cyl. In-line 4-stroke
Ventile	side (SV)	side (SV)
Bore x Stroke	74 mm x 96 mm	74 mm x 96 mm
Cylinder capacity (cc)	2,460	2,460
Power (German hp)	45	45
Power (kW)	33	33
at rpm	3,200	3,200
Compression ratio	5,2 : 1	5,2 : 1
Fuel consumption litres per 100 km	13 L / 100 km	13 L / 100 km
Transmission	3-speed manual with central floor-mounted lever	3-speed manual with central floor-mounted lever
Top speed	85 km/h (53 mph)	85 km/h (53 mph)
Unladen weight	1320 kg	1320 kg
Fully laden weight	1820 kg	1820 kg
Electrical system	6 Volt	6 Volt
Length	4050 mm	4150 mm
Width	1630 mm	1630 mm
Height	1750 mm	1750 mm
Wheelbase	2850 mm	2850 mm
Track front / back	1340 mm / 1340 mm	1340 mm / 1340 mm
Tires	5,00-18"	5,25-18"

== Sources ==
- Oswald, Werner (1996). Deutsche Autos 1920–1945 (10th ed.). Stuttgart, Germany: Motorbuch Verlag. ISBN 3-87943-519-7.
