= List of automobile manufacturers of Germany =

List of German Automotive Manufacturers

== Current major manufacturers ==
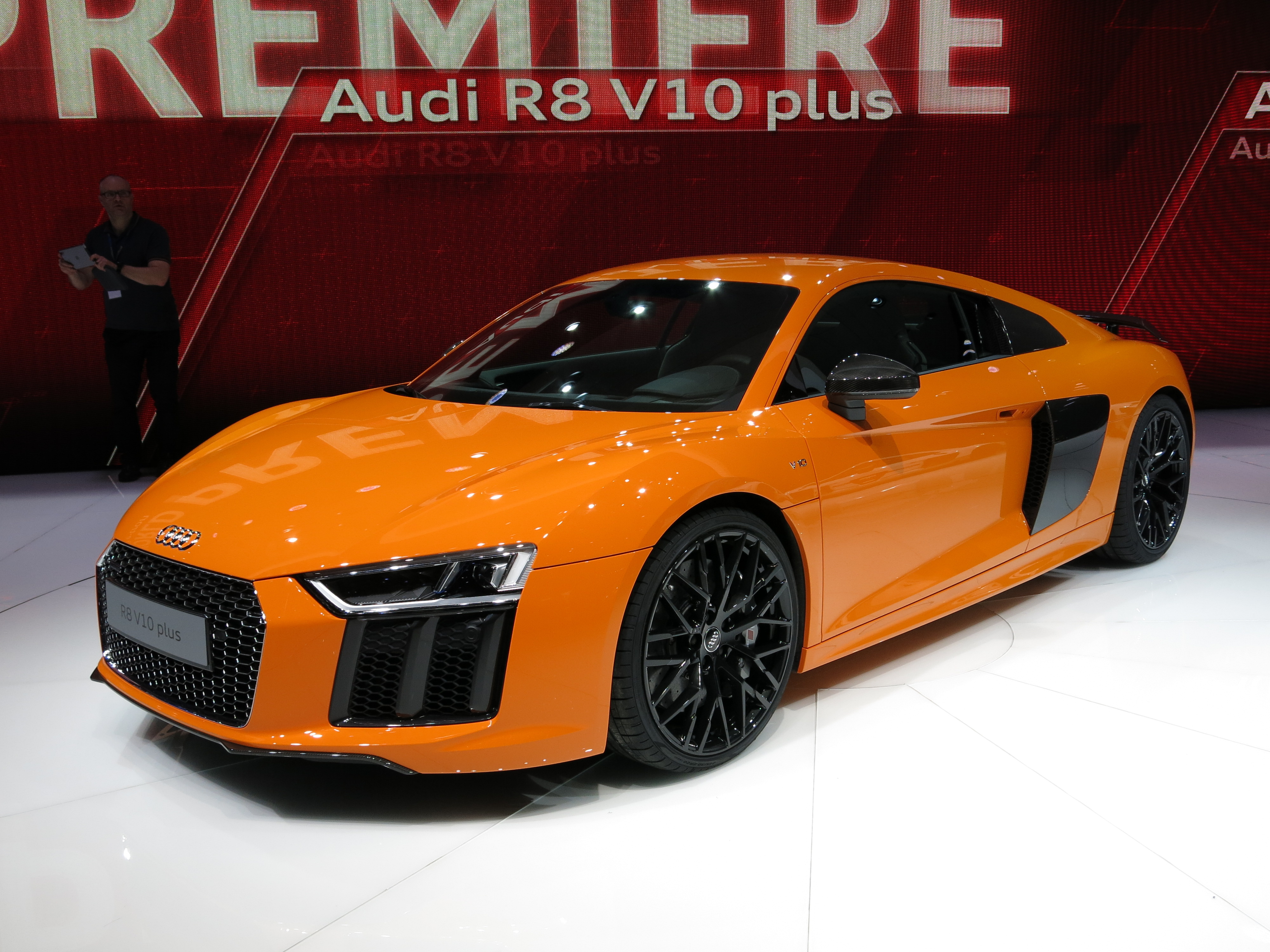
2016 Audi R8

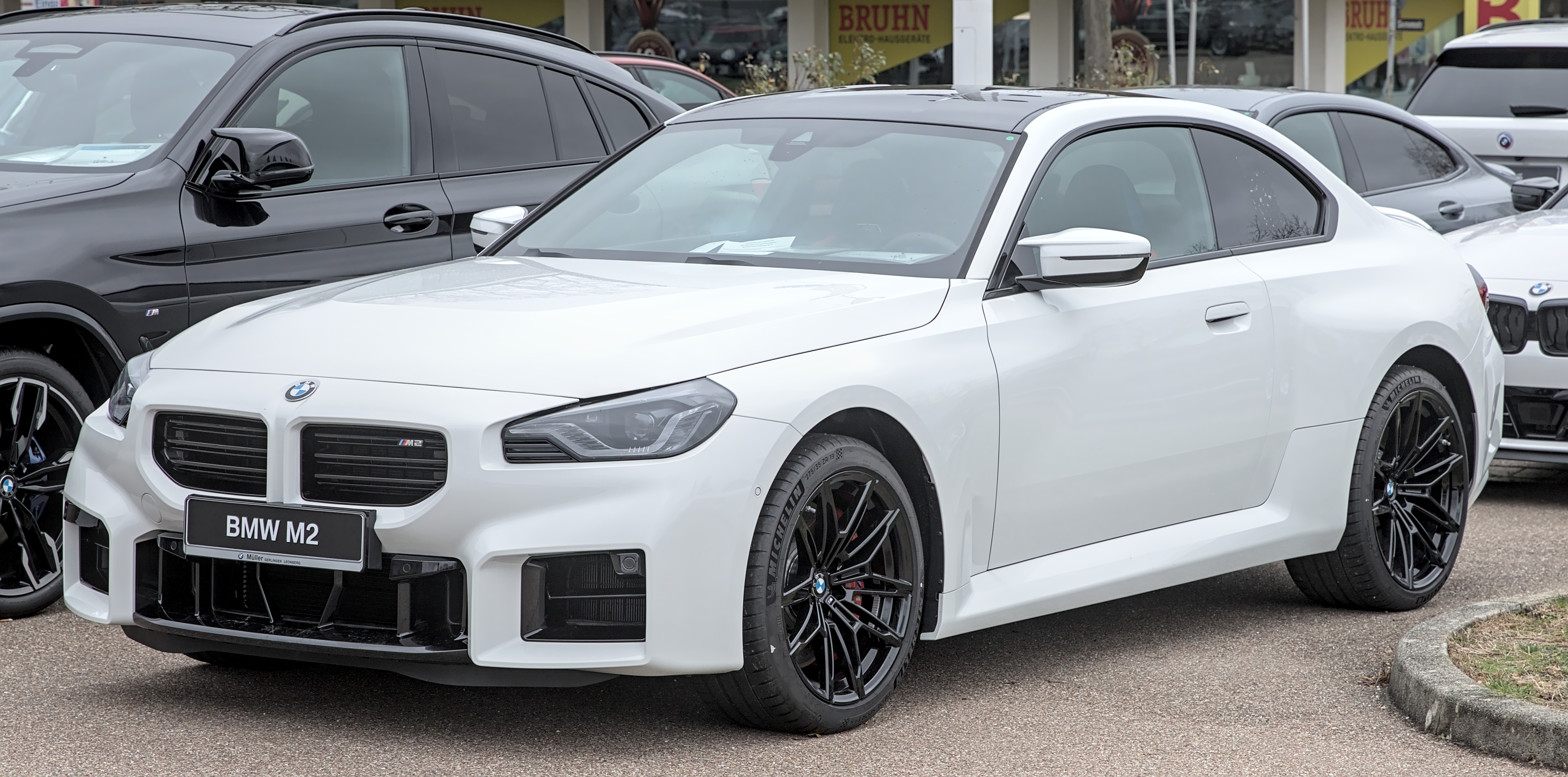
2024 BMW M2

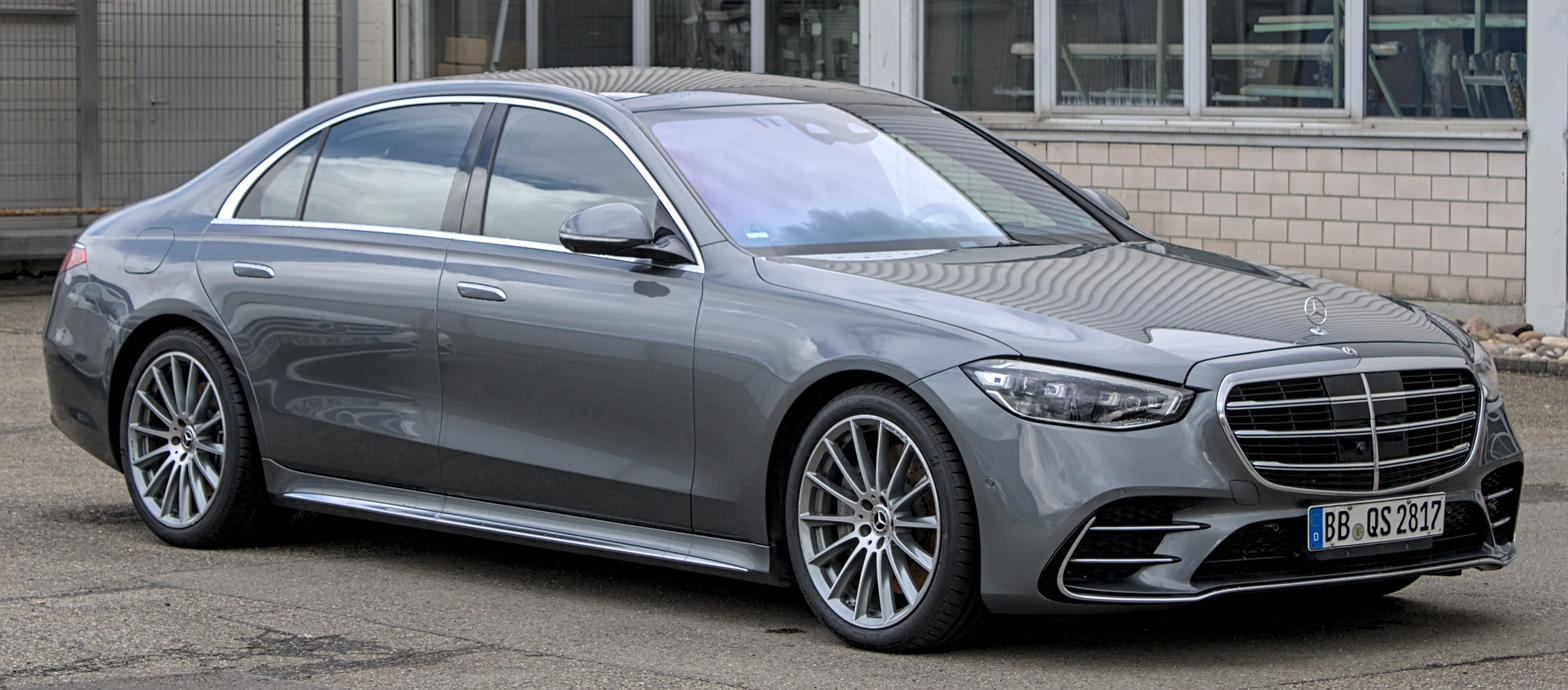
2022 Mercedes-Benz S-Class

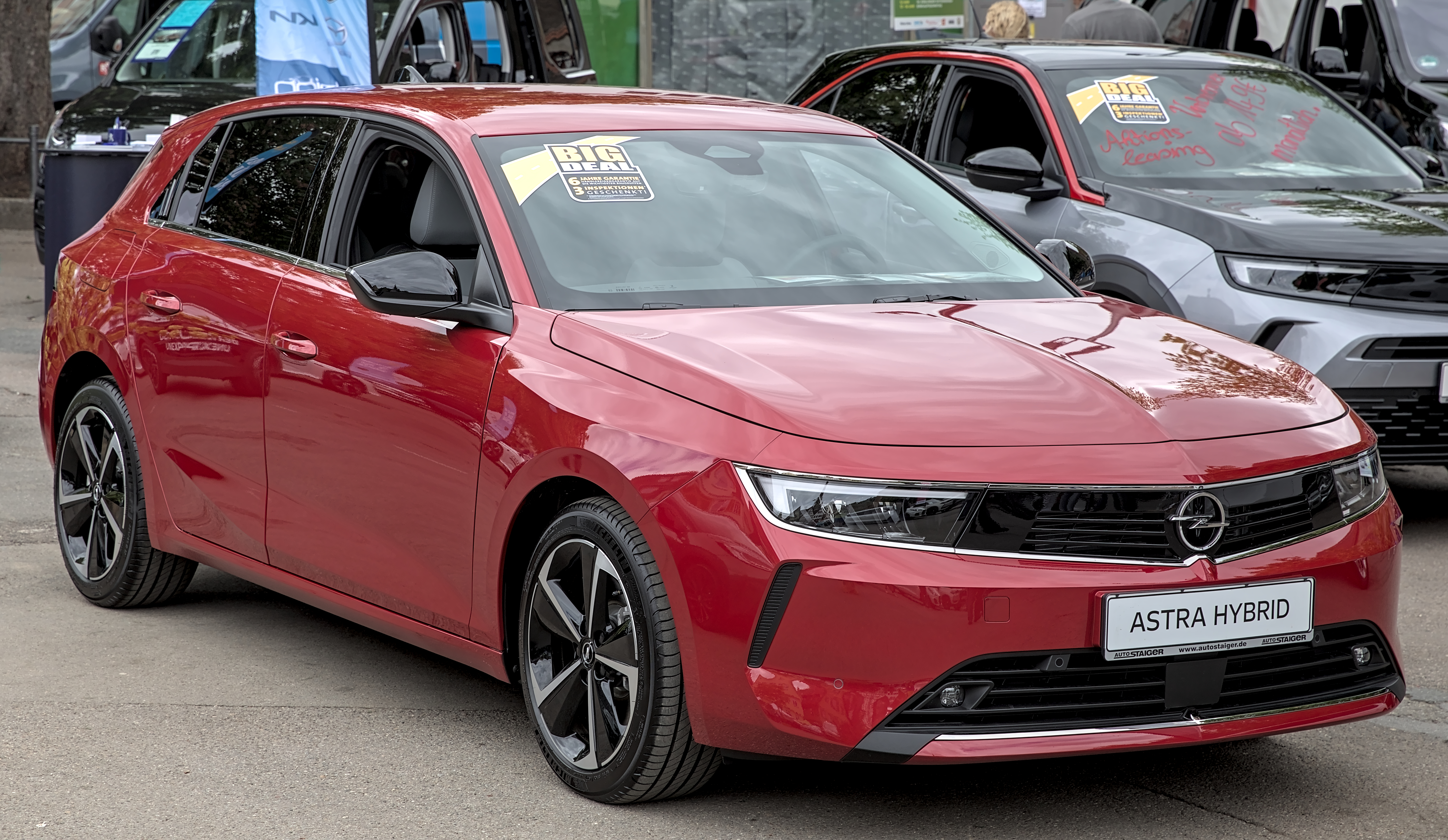
2023 Opel Astra

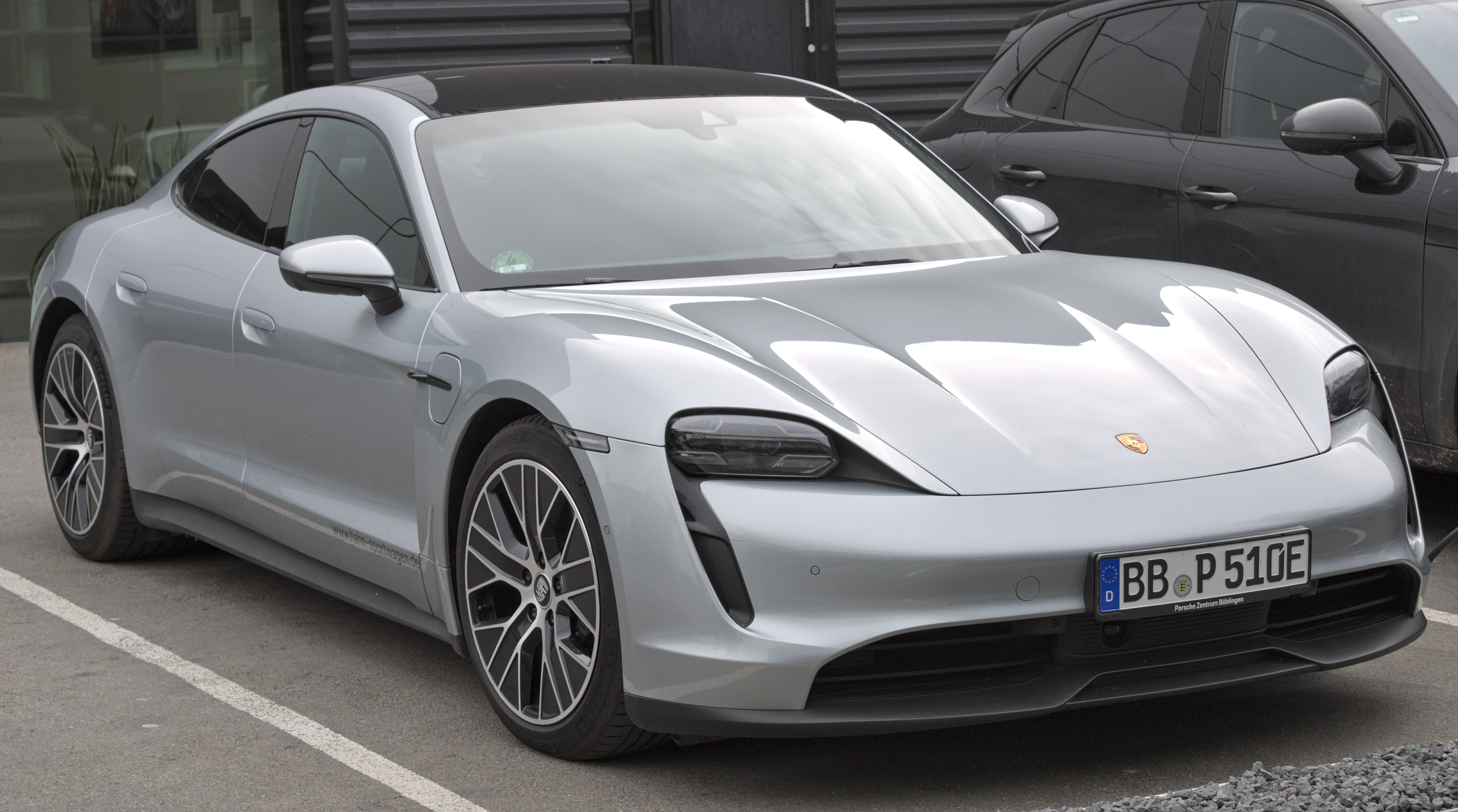
2019 Porsche Taycan

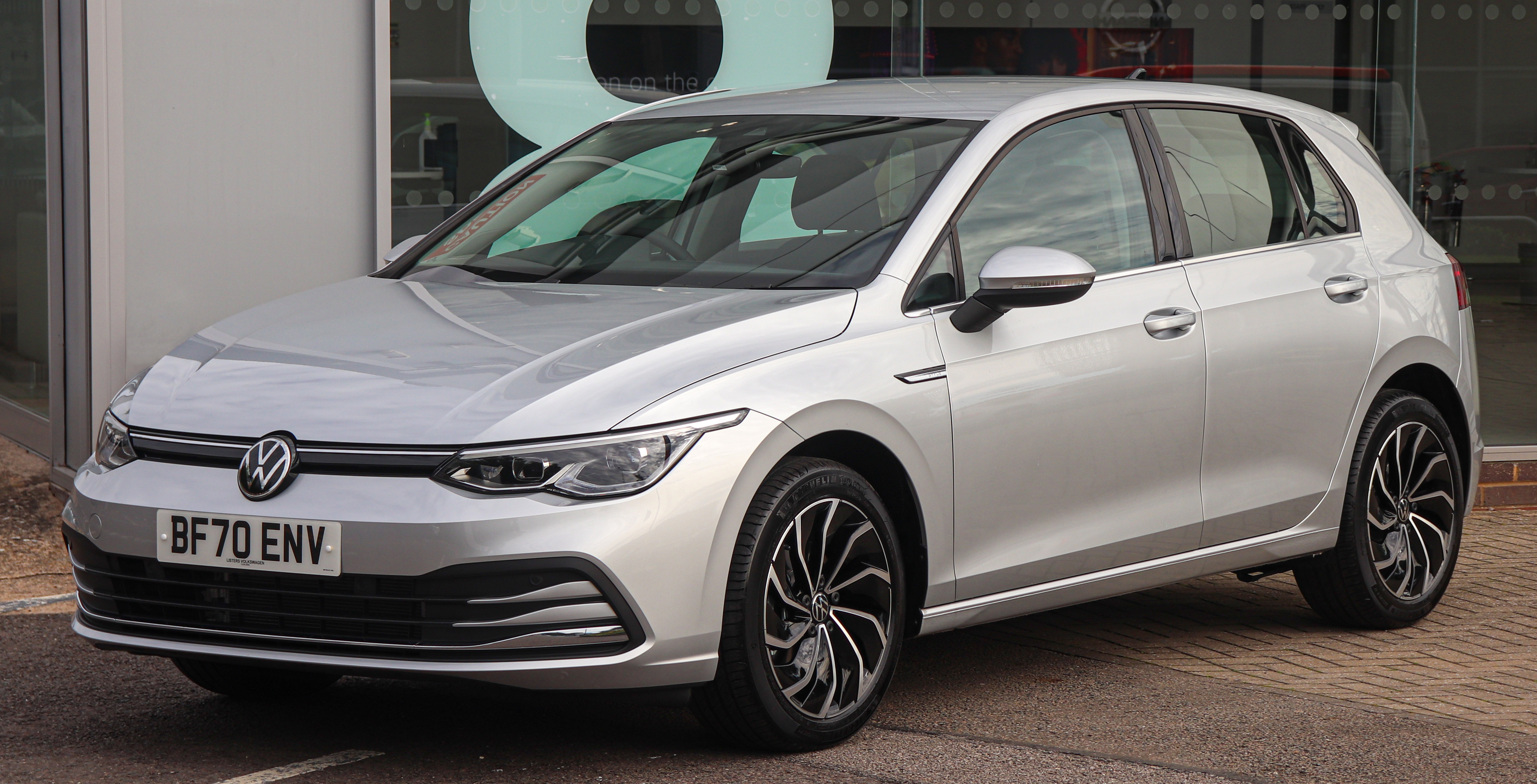
2020 Volkswagen Golf Mk8

Brand	Parent Company
Audi (1909–present)	Volkswagen Group
BMW (1916–present)	BMW Group
Mercedes-Benz (1886–present)	Mercedes-Benz Group
Opel (1862–present)	Stellantis
Porsche (1931–present)	Volkswagen Group
Volkswagen (1937–present)	Volkswagen Group

Foreign manufacturers

Brand	Parent Company
Ford-Werke GmbH (1925–present)	Ford of Europe

== Current minor manufacturers ==
- 9FF (2001–present)
- Aaglander (2003–present)
- AC Schnitzer (1987–present)
- Alpina (1965–present) - BMW Group
- Apollo Automobil (2016–present)
- Arden
- Artega (2016–present)
- Artemis (2021–present)
- BAT
- Binz
- Bitter (1971–present)
- Borgward (1924–1963; 2008–2022)
- Brabus (1977–present)
- CityEl (1987–present)
- Citysax
- e.Go
- Elektron Motors (2021–present)
- Elia
- Gumpert (2004–present)
- Jetcar (2000–present)
- Keinath (1996–present)
- Lotec (1981–present)
- Mansory (1989–present)
- Maybach (1909–present) - Mercedes-Benz Group
- Naran Automotive (2021–present)
- Pegasus (1995–present)
- RG - Roland Gumpert (2017–present)
- Ruf Automobile (1982–present)
- Weineck Engineering
- Wiesmann (1988–present)
- Yes! (1999–present)

== Former manufacturers ==
- AAA (1919)
- Aachener (1902)
- AAG (1900–1901)
- Adler (1900–1939)
- AEG (1901–1906)
- Alan (1923–1925)
- AFM (1949–1953)
- AGA (1919–1929)
- Alfi (1921–1924)
- Alliance (1904–1905)
- Allright (1908–1913)
- Altmann (1905–1907)
- Amor (1924–1925)
- Amphicar (1961–1968)
- Andreas (1900–1902)
- Ansbach (1910–1913)
- Anker (1919–1920)
- Apollo (1910–1927)
- Argus (1902–1910)
- Arimofa (1921–1922)
- Artega (2006–2012) (2015– )
- Asdomobil (1913–1914)
- Äskulap (1900–1901)
- Atlantic (1921–1923)
- Autet (1919)
- Autognom (1906–1908)
- Auto Union (1932–1962)
- AWS (1971–1974)
- Baer (1921–1924)
- Beaulieu & Krone (1905–1907)
- Beaufort (1901–1906)
- Beckmann (1900–1926)
- BEF (1907–1913)
- Benz (1883–1926)
- Benz Söhne (1906–1926)
- Bergmann (1911–1913)
- Bergmann-Metallurgique (1909–1922)
- Berliner Maschinenbau AG (1902)
- Berliner Motorwagen-Fabrik (BMF) (1900–1905)
- Boes (1903–1905)
- Borgward (1939–1961)
- Brennabor (1908–1934)
- Brütsch (1952–1958)
- Bugatti (1910–1918)
- Büssing (1902–1979)
- Butz (1934)
- Carlsson (1989–2023)
- Central-Auto (1899–1906)
- Certus (1928–1929)
- Champion (1948–1954)
- Chatel-Jeannin (1902–1903)
- Cito (1905–1909)
- Cloumobil (1906–1908)
- Club (1922–1924)
- Colibri (1908–1911)
- Corona (1904–1914)
- Cudell (1899–1908)
- Cyklon (1902–1929)
- Daimler (1885–1889)
- De Dietrich (1896–1904)
- Dehn (1924)
- Der Dessauer (1911–1913)
- Dessavia (1907)
- Deutz (1907–1911)
- Diabolo (1922–1927)
- Diana (1922–1923)
- Diem (1906–1909)
- Dinos (1920–1924)
- Dixi (1904–1928)
- DKW (1928–1966)
- DMG (1890–1902)
- Dürkopp (1898–1927)
- Dux (1905–1926)
- EAM (1990)
- Ego (1921–1927)
- Ehrhardt (1905–1924)
- Ehrhardt-Szawe (1924–1925)
- Eisenach (1898–1903)
- Electra (1899–1900)
- EMW (1945–1956)
- Engelhardt (1898–1904)
- Erdmann (1904–1908)
- Excelsior-Mascot (1911–1922)
- Exor (1923)
- Express (1901–1910)
- Fadag (1921–1925)
- Fafag (1921–1923)
- Fafnir (1908–1926)
- Falcon (1921–1926)
- Falke (1899–1908)
- Faun (1921–1928)
- Favorit (1908–1909)
- F.E.G. Friedrich Erdmann Gera (1904–1907)
- Feldmann (1905–1912)
- Ferbedo (1923–1925)
- Fiat-Neckar (1957–1971)
- Fiedler (1900)
- Flitzer (1948–1953)
- Flocken (1888–1903)
- Foth (1902–1909)
- Framo (1932–1937)
- Frankonia F.A.F. (1906–1909)
- Freia (1922–1927)
- Freibahn (1905–1910)
- Fuldamobil (1950–1960)
- Fulmina (1913–1926)
- Gaggenau (1905–1911)
- Gasi (1921)
- Geha (1910–1923)
- Glas (1955–1969)
- Goggomobil (1955–1969)
- Goliath (1931–1963)
- Goossens (1913–1928)
- Göricke (1907–1909)
- Grade (1921–1926)
- Gridi (1923–1924)
- Gutbrod (1904–2005)
- HAG (1922–1925)
- HAG-Gastell (1925–1927)
- Hanomag (1925–1952)
- Hansa (1906–1939)
- Hartmann (1905–1906)
- Hataz (1921–1925)
- Hartge (1985–2019)
- Hawa (1923–1925)
- Heim (1921–1926)
- Heinkel (1955–1958)
- Helios (1903–1906)
- Hellmann (1902–1903)
- Henschel (1899–1918)
- Hentschel (1906–1914)
- Hercules (1898–1926)
- Hermes-Simplex (1904–1906)
- Heucke (1894–1945)
- Hexe (1905–1907)
- Hildebrand (1922–1924)
- Hille (1910–1926)
- Hoffmann (1954–1955)
- Horch (1900–1939)
- Hüttis & Hardebeck (1906–1907)
- Immermobil (1905–1907)
- IFA (1948–1956)
- Induhag (1922)
- Isdera (1983–2025)
- Joswin (1920–1924)
- Juho (1922)
- Karmann (1901–2010)
- K.A.W. Urbanus (1904–1908)
- Kempten (1901–1902)
- Kenter (1923–1925)
- K.E.W. Abam (1898–1907)
- Kleinschnittger (1950–1957)
- Kliemt (1899–1903)
- Klingenberg (1898–1899)
- Koco (1921–1926)
- Komet (1922–1924)
- Komnick (1907–1927)
- Kondor (1902–1904)
- Körting (1922–1924)
- Kroboth (1954–1955)
- Krupkar (1904–1908)
- Kruse (1899–1909)
- Kühlstein (1898–1902)
- Leichtauto (1924)
- Lindcar (1922–1925)
- Lipsia (1922–1924)
- Lloyd (1906–1914; 1950–1963)
- Loeb Luc (1909–1920)
- Loreley (1906–1928)
- Lutzmann (1894–1899)
- Lux (1897–1902)
- Mada (1947–1949)
- MAF (1897–1921)
- Magnet (1903–1926)
- Maico (1955–1958)
- Maja (1923–1924)
- Mannesmann (1923–1929)
- Mars (1906–1908)
- Mathis (1910–1918)
- Maurer-Union (1900–1910)
- Mauser (1923–1929)
- Maxwerke (1900–1903)
- MCA (1962–1964)
- Miele (1912–1914)
- Melkus (1969–1980; 2006–2012)
- Mercedes (1901–1926)
- Merkur (1985–1989)
- Meyra (1948–1956)
- Minimus (1921–1924)
- M.M.B. Motorfahrzeug und Motorenfabrik Berlin (1896–1902)
- M.M.W. Magdeburger Motorfahrzeug Werke (1900–1903)
- Mock (1924)
- Mölkamp (1923–1926)
- Mono (1909–1912)
- Morgan (1924–1925)
- Motorfahrzeug-Fabrik Köln (1909–1912)
- MWD (1911–1912)
- Nacke (1901–1913)
- NAG (1901–1934)
- NAW Norddeutsche Automobil Werke (1908–1917)
- Neckar (1957–1971)
- Noris (1902–1904)
- NSU (1905–1929; 1958–1977)
- NSU-Fiat (1929–1957)
- Nug (1921–1925)
- Omikron (1922–1925)
- Omnimobil (1904–1910)
- Orient Express (1895–1903)
- Oryx (1907–1922)
- Panther (1900–1904)
- Pasing (1901–1904)
- Pawi (1921)
- Peter & Moritz AG (1919–1925)
- Pflüger (1900)
- Phänomen (1907–1927)
- Piccolo (1904–1912)
- Pilot (1923–1925)
- Pinguin (1953–1955)
- Pittler Hydromobil (1903)
- Pluto (1924–1927)
- Podeus (1911–1914)
- Polymobil (1904–1920)
- Premier ; Braun-Premier (1906–1914)
- Presto (1901–1927)
- Priamus (1901–1923)
- Primus (1899–1903)
- Protos (1899–1926)
- Rabag / Rabag-Bugatti (1922–1926)
- Record (1905–1907)
- Regent (1902–1904)
- Reissig (1907–1918)
- Rex-Simplex (1910–1918)
- Röhr (1927–1935)
- Rollfix (1933–1936)
- Rumpler (1921–1926)
- Sablatnig-Beuchelt (1925–1926)
- Sachsenring (1956–1959)
- SAF Süddeutsche Automobil Fabrik GmbH (1905–1911)
- SB / Slaby-Beringer (1920–1924)
- Scheele (1899–1910)
- Scheibler (1900–1907)
- Schiemann (1901–1914)
- Schöche (1895)
- Schulz (1902–1907)
- Schütze Bauer (1899–1902)
- Schwenke (1904–1905)
- Seck (1897)
- Securus Sekurus (1906)
- Seidel-Arop (1925–1926)
- Selve (1919–1929)
- S.H.W. (1924–1925)
- Siegel (1907–1911)
- Siemens & Halske (1892–1900)
- Siemens-Schuckert (1906–1910)
- Simson / Simson Supra (1911–1933)
- Smart (1994–2019)
- Söhnlein (1873)
- Solidor (1905–1907)
- Solomobil (1921–1923)
- Sperber (1911–1919)
- Sphinx (1920–1925)
- Staiger (1923–1924)
- Standard (1911–1912)
- Standard Superior (1933–1935)
- Staunau (1950–1951)
- Steiger (1914–1926)
- Steudel (1904–1911)
- Stoewer (1899–1940)
- Stoll (1902–1909)
- Stolle (1924–1927)
- Stoltz (1903–1905)
- Sun (1906–1908)
- Szawe (1920–1924)
- Taifun (1905–1907)
- Taunus (1907–1909)
- Tempo (1933–1956)
- Thüringer Motorwagen (1894–1895)
- Thurner (1970–1973)
- Titan
- Tornax (1934–1937)
- Torpedo (1907–1920)
- Tourist (1907–1920)
- Trabant (1957–1991)
- Treskow (1906–1908)
- Triomobil (1903–1908)
- Trippel (1934–1944)
- Tuchscherer (18??)
- Turbo (1923–1924)
- Ultramobile (1904–1908)
- Union (1914–1921)
- Utilitas (1920–1921)
- Velomobil (1905–1906)
- Veni (1911)
- Veritas (1947–1953)
- Victoria (1900–1909; 1957–1958)
- Vindelica Blessing (1898–1900)
- Vomag (1915–1945)
- Voran (1926–1928)
- Vogtland (1910–1912)
- Vulkan (1895–1905)
- Walmobil (1919–1921)
- Wanderer (1911–1942)
- Wartburg (1898–1904, 1956–1990)
- Weck (1903–1918)
- Weichelt (1908)
- Weiss (1902–1906)
- Wendax (1950–1951)
- Wenkelmobil (1904–1907)
- Wesnigk (1920–1925)
- Westfalia (1906–1914)
- Windhoff (1908–1914)
- Wittekind (1922–1925)
- Wolf (1862–1928)
- YES! (2000–2009)
- Zender (1969–2008)
- Zentralmobil (1907–1908)
- Zündapp (1956–1958)
- Zwickau (1956–1959)

== See also ==
- Automotive industry in Germany
- Automotive industry
- List of automobile marques
- List of motorcycle manufacturers
- List of truck manufacturers

== Sources ==
- Georgano, Nick (Ed.). The Beaulieu Encyclopedia of the Automobile. Chicago: Fitzroy Dearborn, 2000. ISBN 1-57958-293-1
- Mazur, Eligiusz (Ed.). World of Cars 2006 / 2007: Worldwide Car Catalogue. Warsaw: Media Connection, 2006. ISSN 1734-2945
