= Pawi =

Pawi may refer to:

- Pawi (automobile), an early automobile made in Germany
- the Lai people, who were formerly known as Pawi
- the Trinidad piping-guan, Aburria pipile, an endangered bird in the guan family Cracidae

                                                                                                                                              -->
