= Alfi (car manufacturer) =

German car brand from the 1920s

The Alfi was a German automobile brand built between 1921 and 1925, and again between 1927 and 1928. The Alfi was built in Berlin (then in Prussia), initially by the electrical company AG für Akkumulatoren- und Automobilbau (AAA) (transl. Rechargeable Battery and Automobile Manufacture Inc.), which later also changed its name to Alfi.

== First generation ==
The company had been responsible for the AAA line of electric cars and vans which were supplied in large numbers to the German postal service. In 1922, when the company decided to move to engine driven cars, it changed its name to Alfi, derived from the owner's name, Alex Fischer.

The first Alfi model had a 780 cc (48 cu in) flat-twin engine. This was followed by a side valve 940 cc (57 cu in) inline-four engine manufactured by Steudel of Kamenz in Saxony. Next came an inline-four of 1,320 cc (81 cu in) built by Atos of Berlin. The company ceased production in 1925.

== Second generation ==
A new Alfi company, Alfi Automobile GmbH was formed in 1927, also by Alex Fischer. This time the cars and vans were three-wheelers powered by DKW engines driving the single front wheel. These could be turned 180 degrees to propel the car backward. An additional four-wheeled model, the 4-wheeled Alfi Sport, had a 2/10PS engine, was bodied as an open or coupe two-seater, and was produced in small numbers. The company closed in 1928.

== See also ==
- V4 engine
- Drezdenko
- Flat engine
