= Kenter =

German automobile from the 1920s

The Kenter was a German automobile manufactured from 1923 until 1925. Successor to the Komet, it was available in either an sv four with 1060 cc Steudel engine or an Atos-engined model of 1305 cc.
