= Markranstädter Automobilfabrik =

German automobile manufacturer

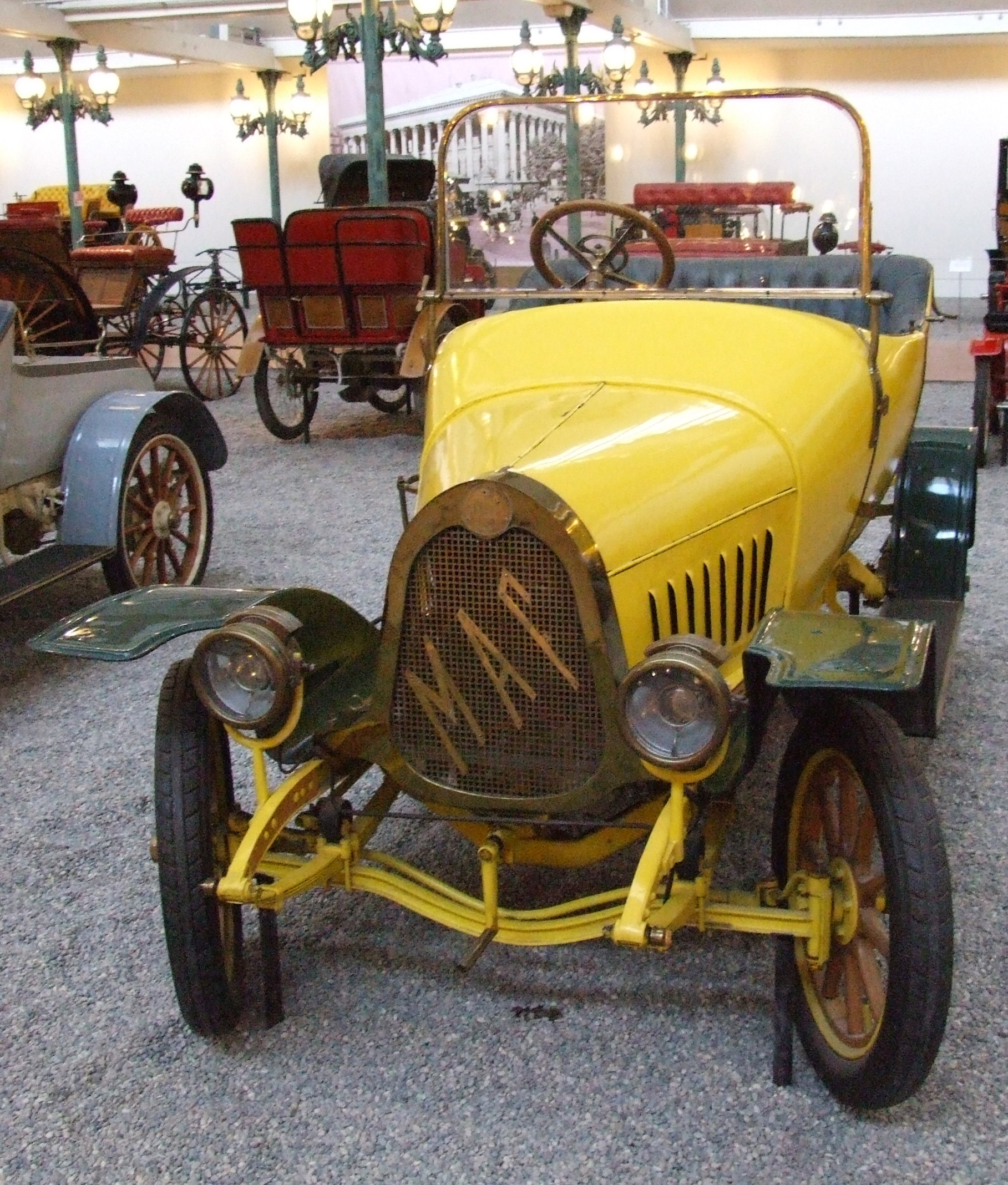
MAF, 1914

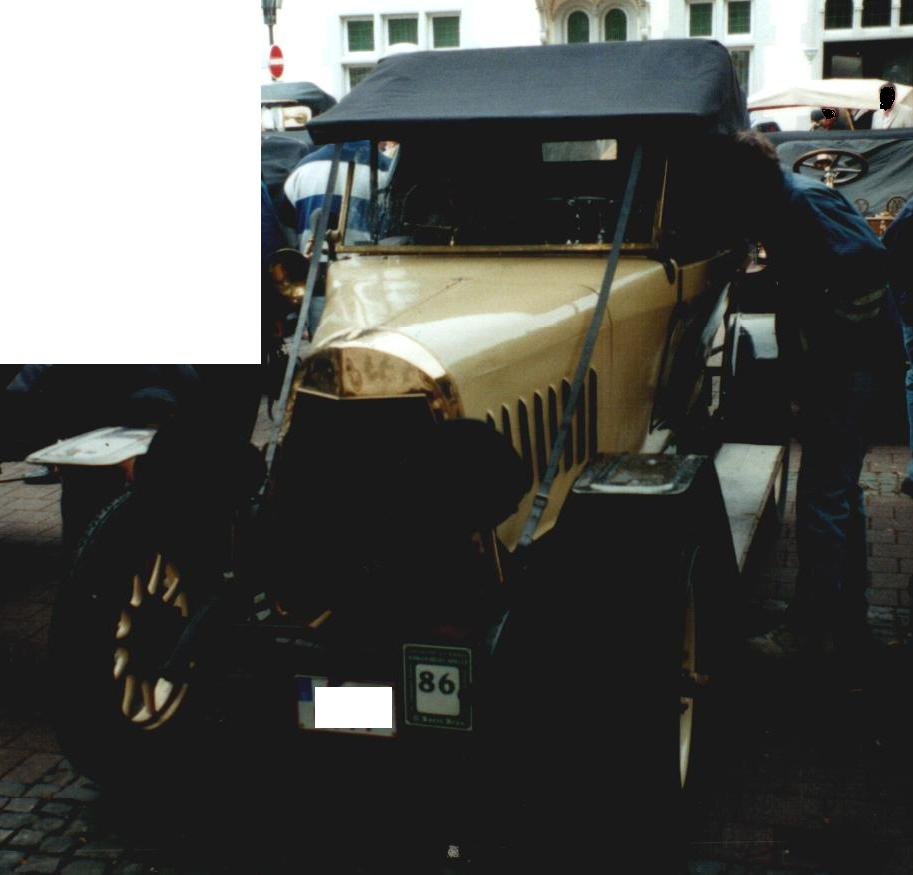
MAF, 1913

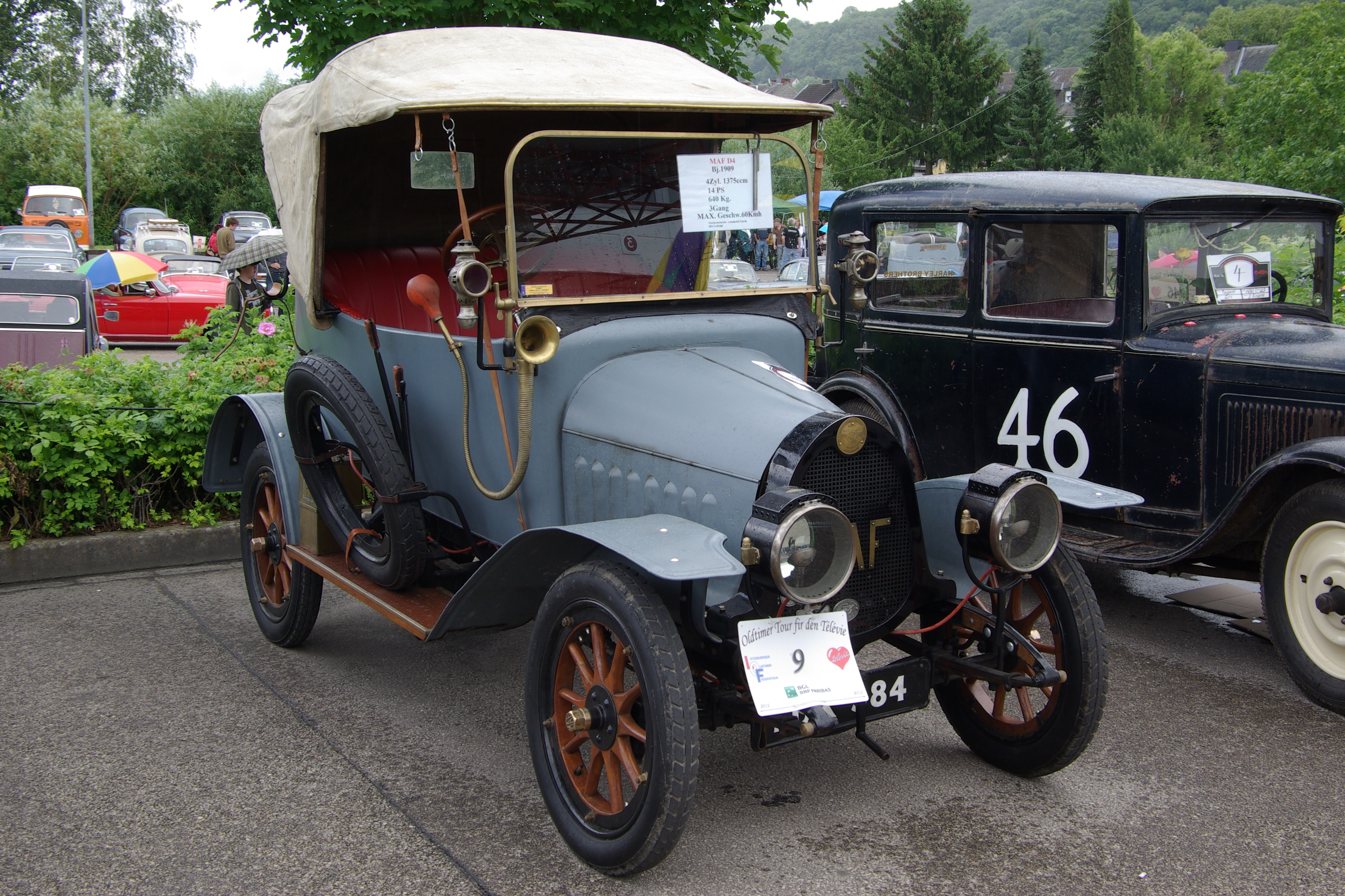
MAF 14 HP, 1909

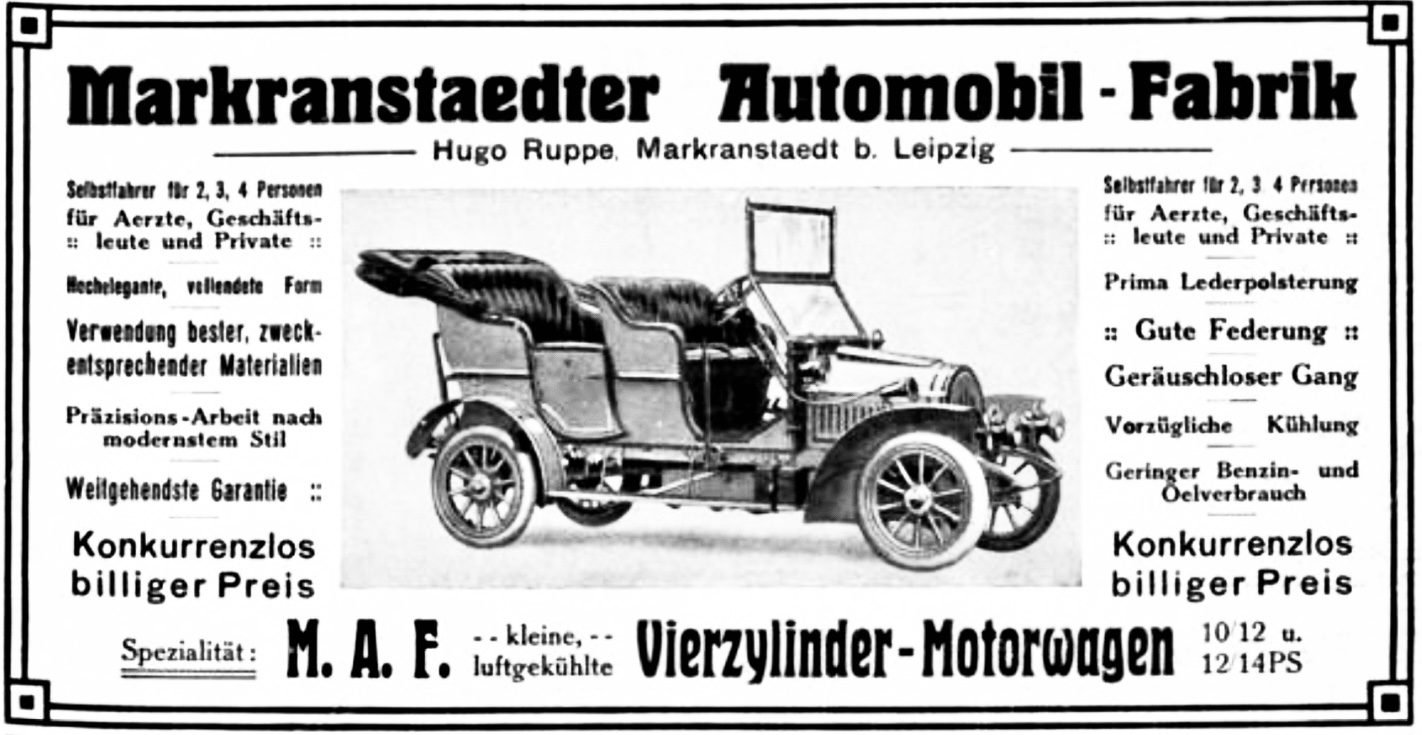
Markranstädter Automobilfabrik (1909).

The Markranstädter Automobilfabrik is a former producer of automobiles from Markranstädt, Germany, which was active between 1909 and 1923.

Hugo Ruppe founded the Markranstädter car factory in 1909, producing cars that were sold under the brand name MAF. The first model was the Type D 4 from 1909 to 1913. Its air-cooled four-cylinder engine with 1192 cc provided 12 PS. The Type F 5 followed in 1913 with 1375 cc and 14 hp, and the G 6 with 1620 cc and 16 hp. Due to the outbreak of World War I in 1914 production was interrupted.

After the war MAF produced the pre-war type F 5, and the 6 / 18 hp which replaced the G 6. MAF also built the type 8 / 25 hp, and the large 14 / 35 hp with a six-cylinder engine. In 1921 the factory was taken over by the Apollo-Werke AG, and in 1923 the last models were produced by MAF.

Very few examples of the MAF remain today. A type F 5 / 14 PS of 1914 is in the Cité de l'Automobile in Mulhouse, France. In addition, a collector in Saxony still owns a vehicle of this brand.

== Literature ==
- Halwart Schrader: German cars from 1885 to 1920. Motor Verlag, Stuttgart, ISBN 3-613-02211-7
- Werner Oswald: German cars from 1920 to 1945. Motor Verlag, Stuttgart, ISBN 3-87943-519-7
