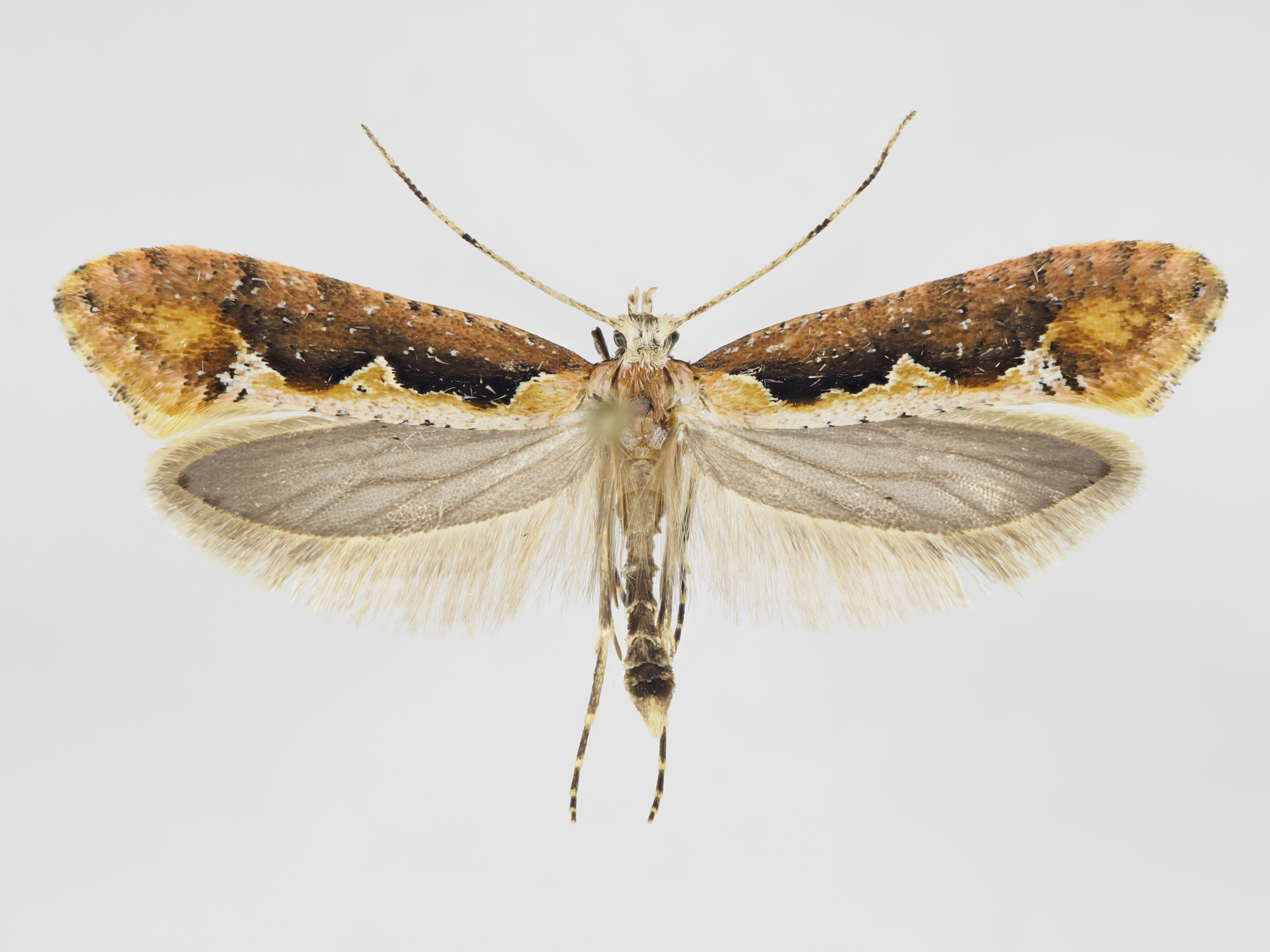

Scientific classification
- Domain: Eukaryota
- Kingdom: Animalia
- Phylum: Arthropoda
- Class: Insecta
- Order: Lepidoptera
- Family: Plutellidae
- Genus: Rhigognostis
- Species: R. incarnatella

Binomial name
- Rhigognostis incarnatella (Steudel, 1873)

Synonyms
- Plutella incarnatella Steudel, 1873

= Rhigognostis incarnatella =

Species of moth

Rhigognostis incarnatella, the Scotch smudge, is a moth of the family Plutellidae. It was described by Wilhelm Steudel in 1873. It is found in most of Europe.

The wingspan is 17–21 mm.Similar to Plutella xylostella but larger and more brightly-coloured.

Adults are on wing from September to April in one generation per year, overwintering by hiding in thick cover.

The larvae feed on Hesperis matronalis, Cardamine bulbifera, Sisymbrium, Alliaria and Cheiranthus species form beneath a silken web.
