= Hexe =

The Hexe was a German automobile manufactured in Hamburg from 1905 until 1907. Patterned on the Nagant, fours of 18/20 hp, 24/30 hp, and 40/45 hp were available, as was a 35/40 hp six.
