= Joswin =

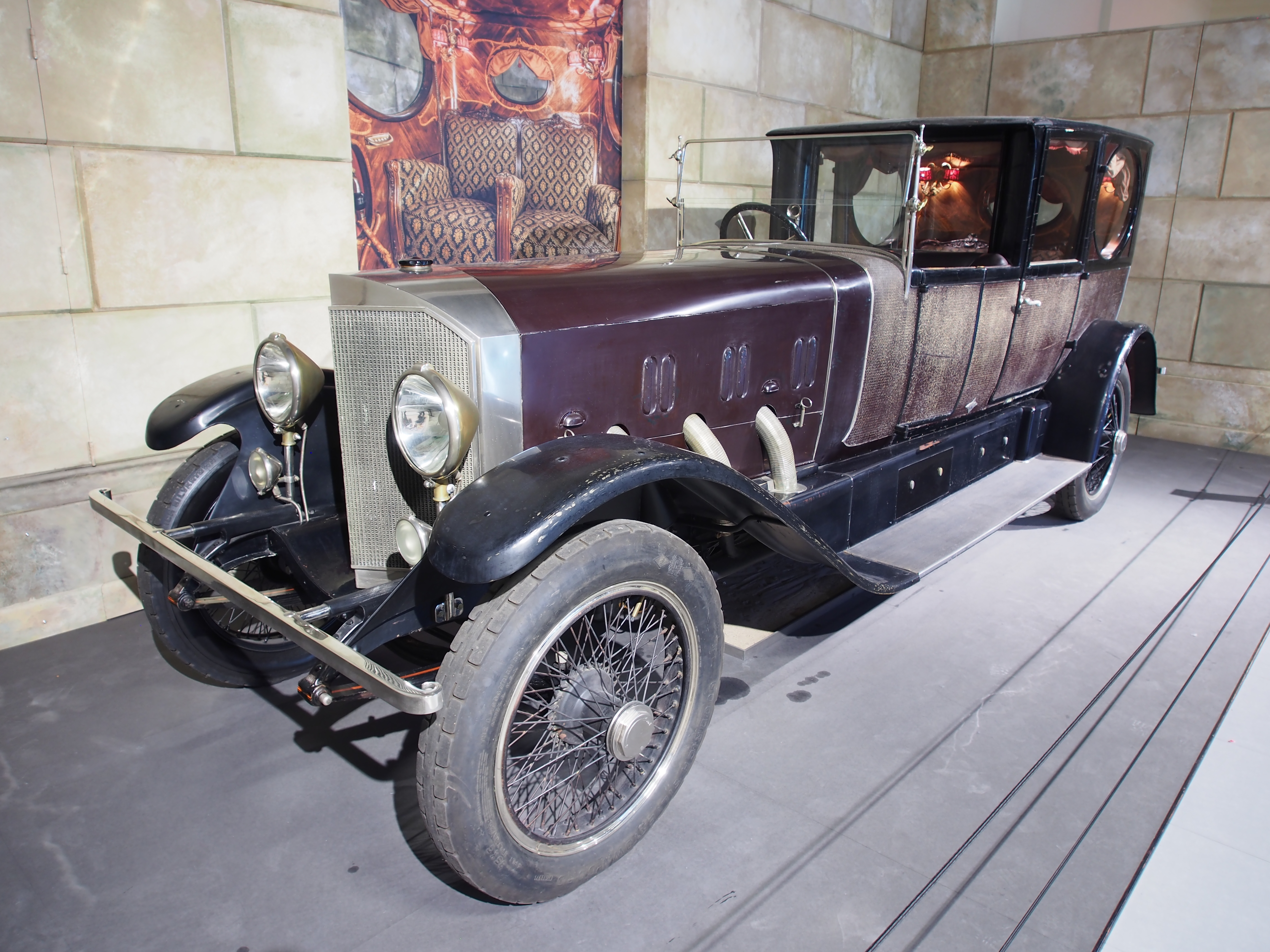
Joswin

The Joswin was a German automobile manufactured from 1920 until 1924. Big luxury cars, they were powered by war-surplus Mercedes six-cylinder, 12 spark plug aeroengines of 6462 cc and 7269 cc which had been modified by designer Josef Winsch; construction took place at his works in Berlin-Halensee.
