= Podeus =

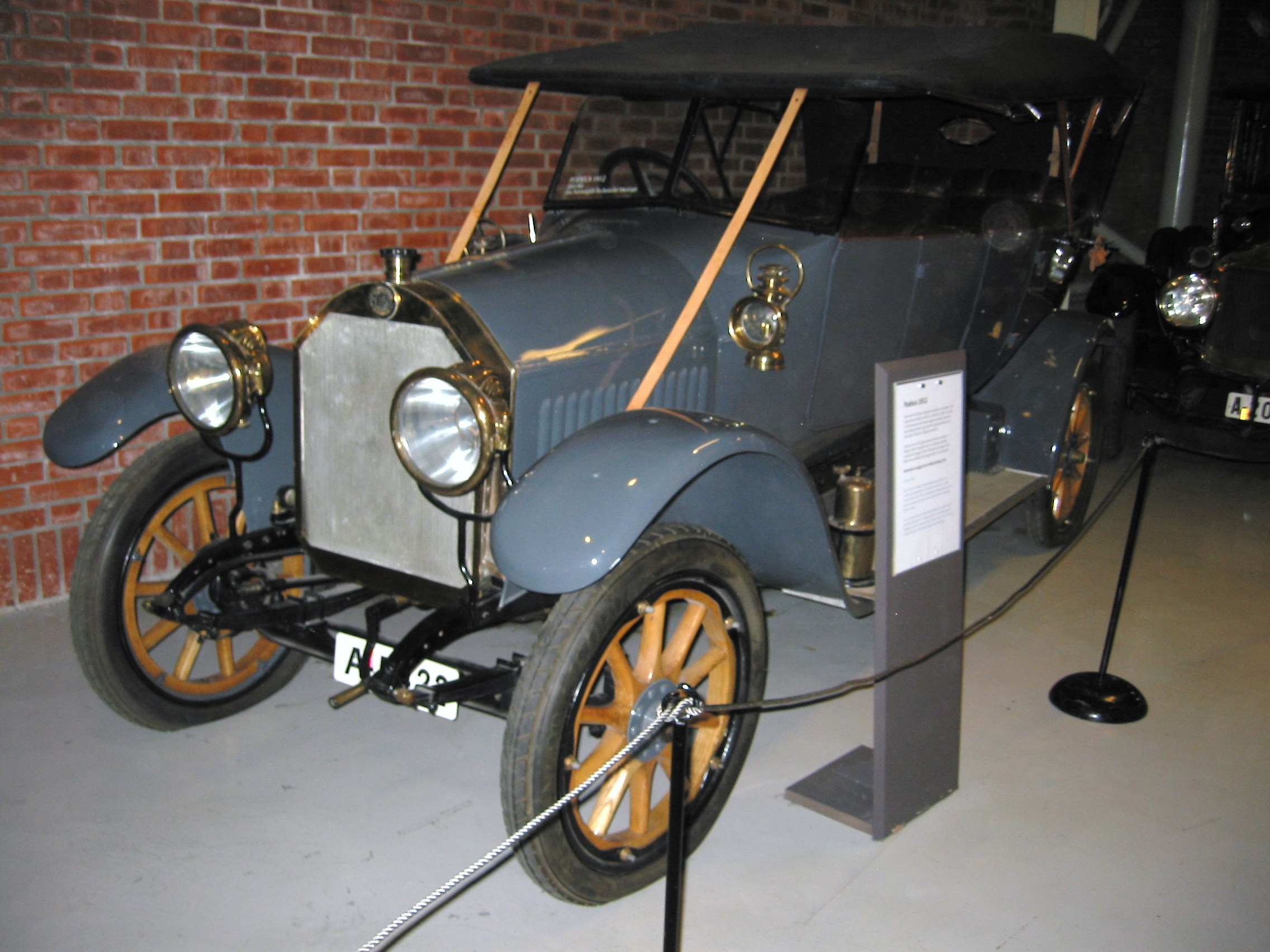
Podeus vehicle (1912)

In 1902, a Podeus truck prototype was built for the first time. The vehicle was made in Crull's iron foundry. After the death of Heinrich Podeus, who lived from November 9, 1832, to July 21, 1905, automobile production was started. Podeus was a captain, shipowner, and an industrialist who began his industrial career in Wismar with a coal import company. The Podeus was a German automobile manufactured from 1911 to 1914; the works at Wismar produced two models, both fours: a 2248 cc and a 2536 cc sv. The cars were even delivered to Russia, Denmark, India, and Brazil.
