= Andreas Sächsische Accumulatorenwerke =

Sächsische Accumulatorenwerke
- Industry: Automotive
- Founded: 1900; 126 years ago
- Founder: Dr. Ernst Andreas
- Defunct: 1902; 124 years ago
- Headquarters: Dresden, Germany
- Products: Cars , batterys

The Sächsische Accumulatorenwerke in Dresden was a German battery manufacturer company that produced electric cars from 1900 to 1902.

== History ==
As early as 1899, the Saxon Accumulator Works was transformed into a joint-stock company under the new management of Mr. C. Hartenstein and Dr. Ernst Andreas. The company began producing automobiles in 1900. The brand names was Andreas. The Andreas electric car, which was built from 1900 to 1902 by the Saxon Accumulator Works in Dresden, was based on the design of the company owner Dr. Ernst Andreas. From April 23 to 28, 1900, a test drive for electrically powered vehicles was held in Berlin by the Central European Motor Vehicle Association. A vehicle from the Saxon Accumulator Works also participated in this trip. The automobile was described as a goods vehicle, a van and not a passenger car. Another twelve vehicles were also registered.

- Eisenacher Fahrzeugwerke with a six-seater passenger car.
- Allgemeine Betriebsaktiengesellschaft für Motorfahrzeuge from Cologne with a vehicle.
- Car Manufacturing Company Kliemt, Berlin, 1 business car
- Heinrich Scheele, Cologne, 1 Mylord, 1 business car
- Berlin Electric Car and Battery Works Fiedler & Co., 1 coupe, 1 business car
- Berlin Machine Factory Henschel & Co., Berlin-Charlottenburg, 1 coupe, 1 phaeton, 1 truck
- "Vulcan" Automobile Company Ltd., 1 business car
- Car Factory Gebrüder Kruse, Hamburg, hunting car for four people

== Technical data ==
The two-seater car was built on a steel tube chassis. Instead of a body, it only had a wooden frame covered with canvas. The front wheels were steered with the help of the two electric motors mounted on the front axle; the speed was regulated differently for each motor. This steering system was patented in 1900. Only when stationary or with the motors switched off could assistance be provided using a handwheel with a worm gear. The electric motors each delivered 2.5 hp, so together 5 hp. The power from the electric motors was transmitted to the front wheels via gears. The construction was similar to the design of the company Krieger. Whether a license payment was required is not known. The accumulator had a voltage of 48 volts. The capacity was sufficient for a range of 40 to 50 km.
