= Solidor =

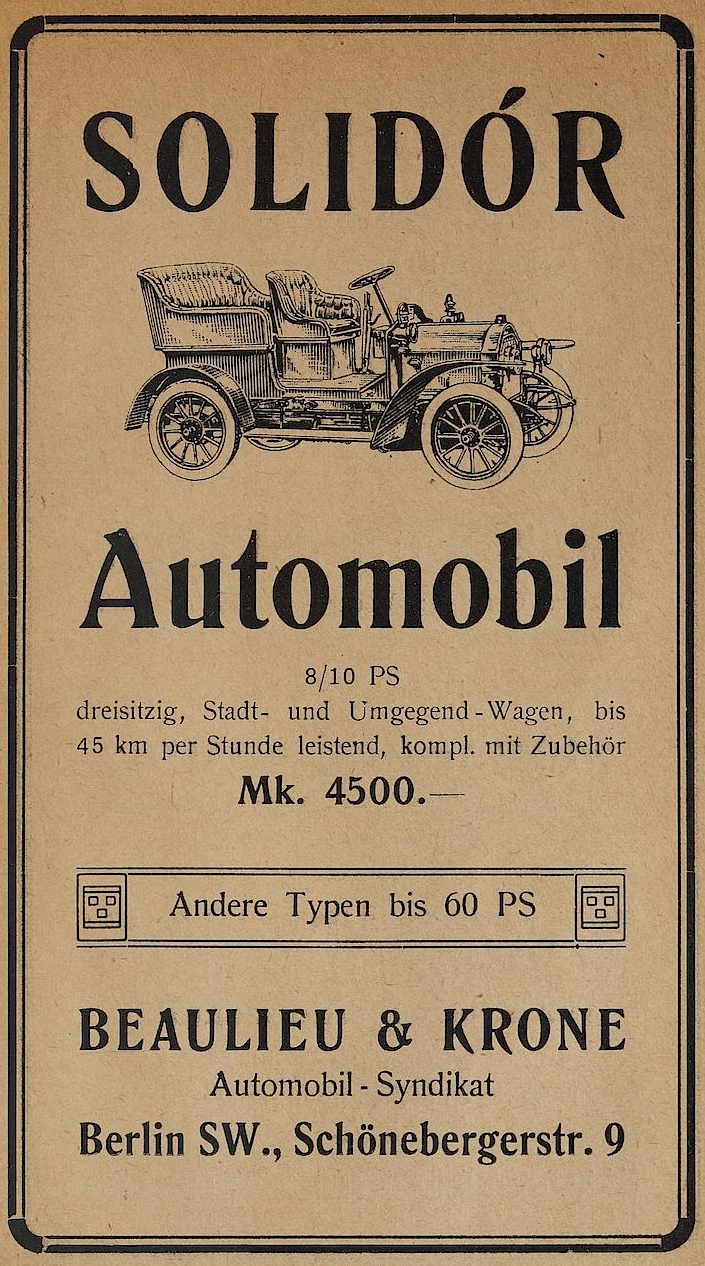
Solidór Automobil (1907)

The German company Beaulieu & Krone introduced an automobile under the brand name Solidor, which was manufactured in Berlin from 1905 until 1907. It was essentially a rebranded Passy-Thellier produced under license with the name Solidor.
