= Seidel-Arop =

The Seidel-Arop was a German automobile manufactured from 1925 until 1926. A small car, it was doomed to failure by lack of adequate production facilities; a model with a sv 1020cc four-cylinder engine was the only one offered.
