= Jacob Boes & Co. =

German company

- Industry: Automotive
- Founded: 1903; 123 years ago
- Founder: Jacob Boes
- Defunct: 1905; 121 years ago
- Headquarters: Berlin, Germany
- Products: Cars

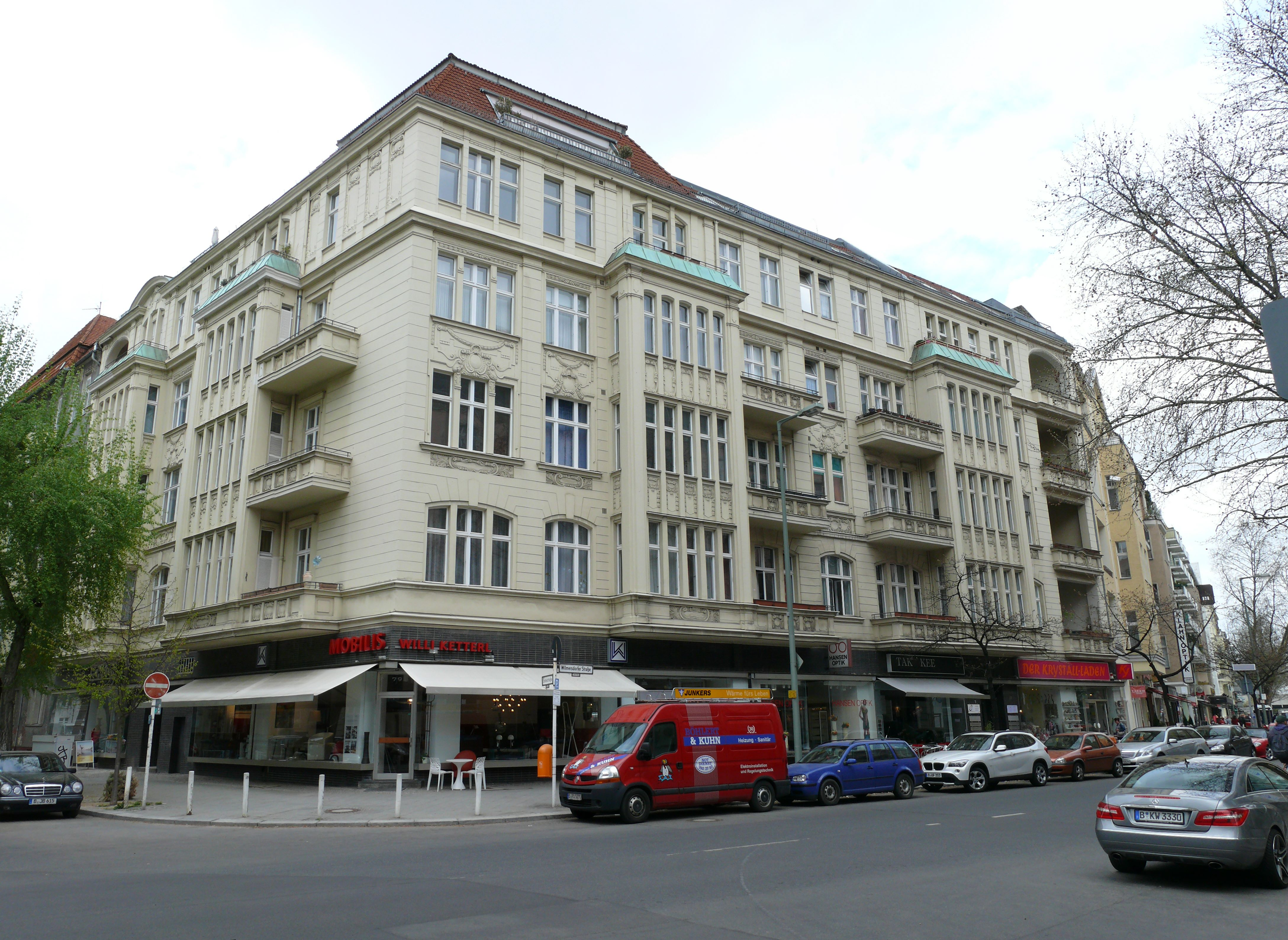
Charlottenburg Wilmersdorfer Straße 79

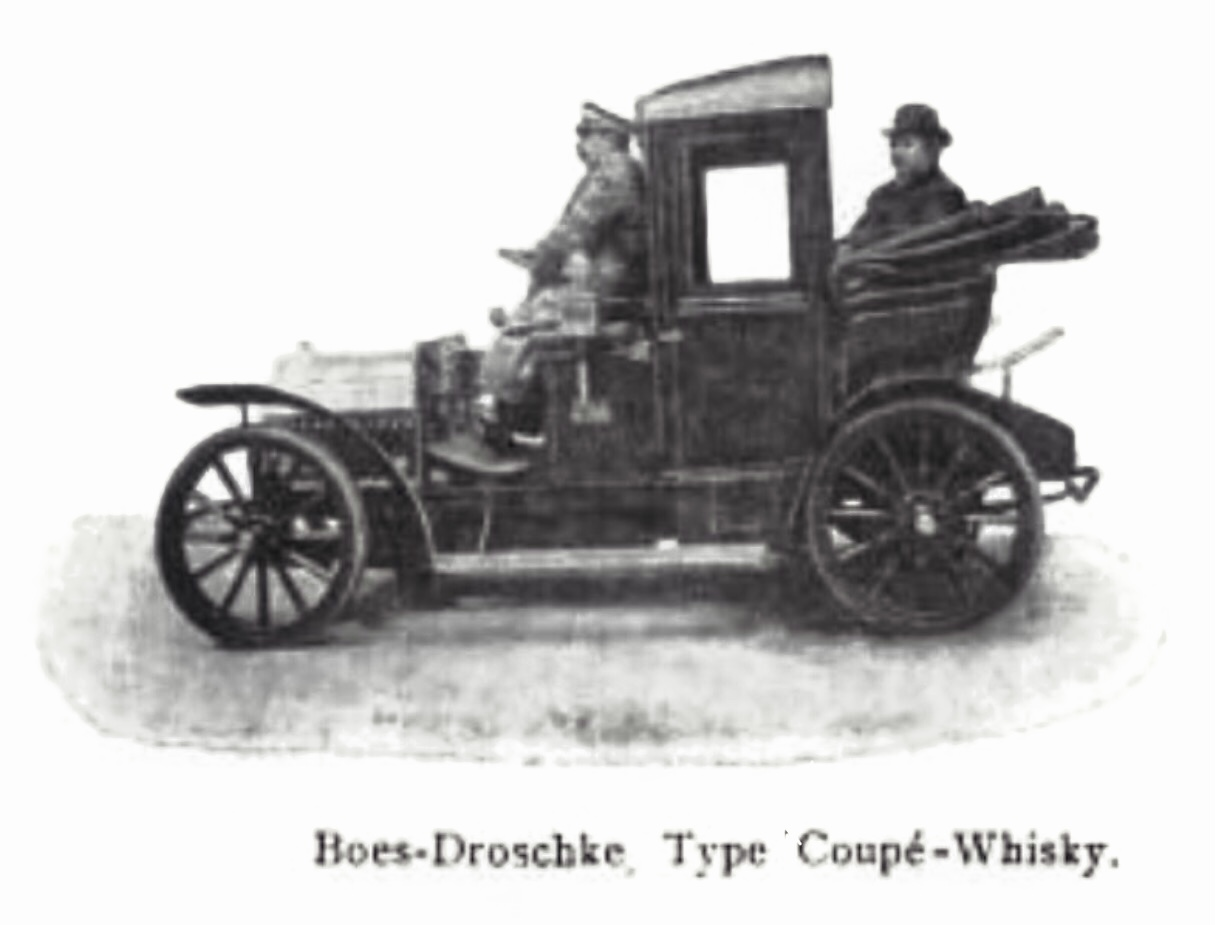
Jacob Boes & Co. cap-taxi type coupé Whiskey (1905)

The Jacob Boes & Co. in Berlin was a German company that produced cars from 1903 until 1905.

== History ==
The company Jacob Boes & Co. was a German automobile manufacturer based in Charlottenburg today Berlin from 1903 to 1905. The company, originally a bicycle repair workshop, had already been founded in the 1890s. From 1903, three- and four-wheeled automobiles were offered. The engines came with either one or two cylinders upon request. The business premises were originally located at Wilmersdorfer Strasse 76-79. Due to a large order for postal delivery vehicles from the Imperial Reichspost, Jacob Boes required more capital. Wealthy partners were brought in to expand the business. The motor cab/taxi sector also expanded, and additional business premises were rented at Waldemarstrasse 55. In Waldemar Street, garage spaces for around twenty-five cars were also offered.

Although business was going quite well, the company ultimately lacked capital. In 1905, the operation had to be dissolved due to over-indebtedness.

For the International Motor Show in Berlin in 1905, the company Jacob Boes & Co was registered under the number 101.
