= Excelsior-Mascot =

The Excelsior-Mascot was a German automobile manufactured in Nippes, Cologne (Prussia) from 1911 until 1922. Only a few, with two- and four-cylinder proprietary engines of 8 hp to 18 hp, were produced.
