= Berliner Maschinenfabrik Henschel & Co. GmbH =

German company

- Industry: Automotive
- Founded: 1899; 127 years ago
- Defunct: 1918; 108 years ago
- Headquarters: Berlin, Germany
- Products: Cars , trucks, boats

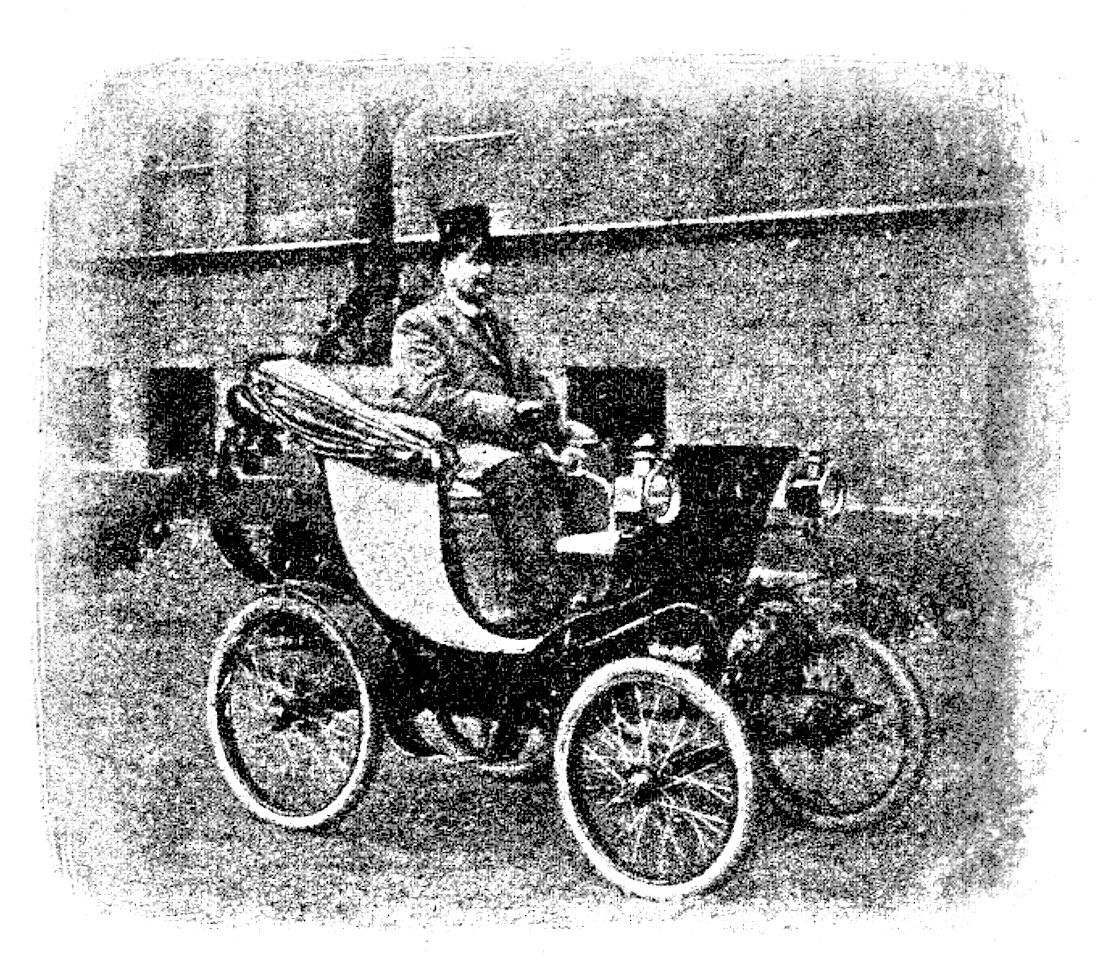
Henschel Phaeton three person (1899)

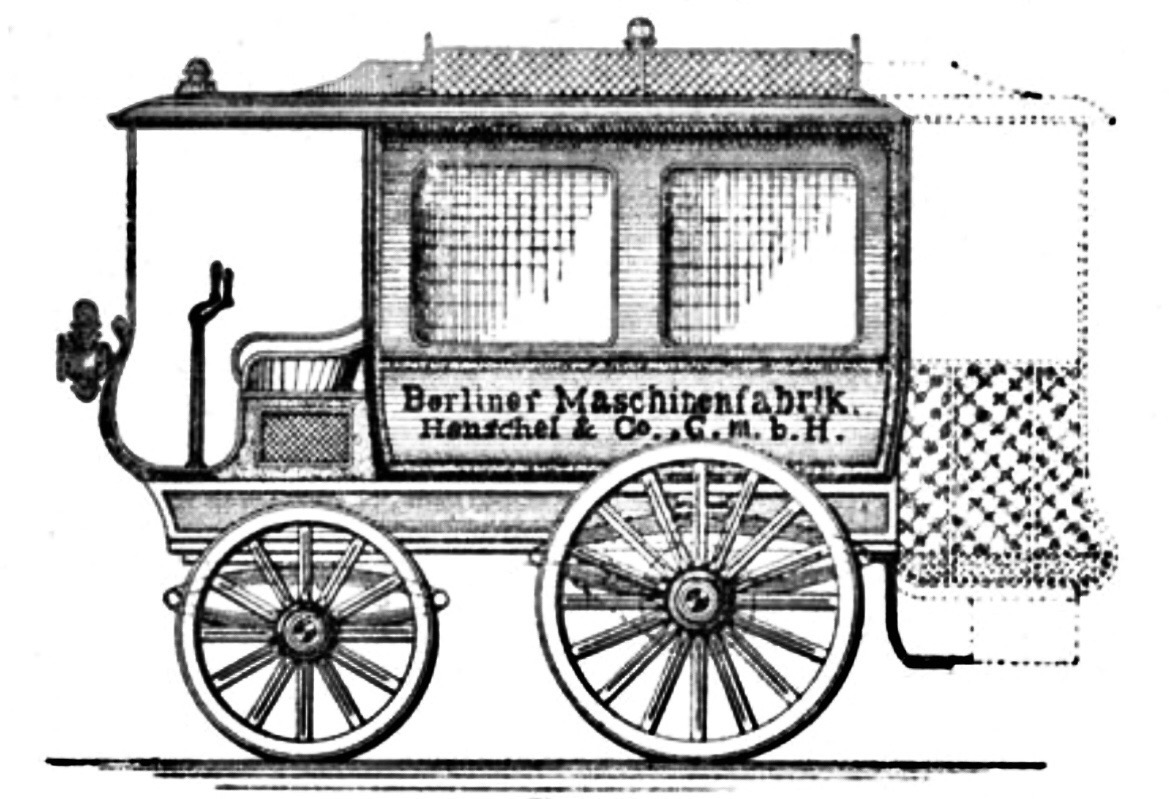
Henschel Taxi (1899)

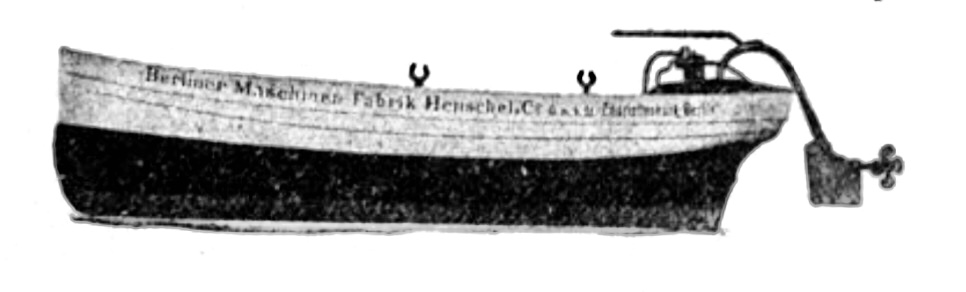
Henschel boat (1900)

The Berliner Maschinenfabrik Henschel & Co. GmbH was a German company based in Berlin that produced cars, trucks and motorboats from 1899 to 1918.

== History ==
Long before the better-known locomotive factory Henschel & Sohn from Kassel, the Berlin Machine Factory Henschel & Co GmbH had begun the production of trucks and automobiles. While the locomotive manufacturer recognized a downturn in the world economy in the mid-1920s, Henschel considered developing another line of business to be less dependent on locomotive construction. The decision was therefore made to enter the already rapidly expanding field of commercial vehicle production. In 1925, the manufacturing of trucks and bus chassis began. The Berlin machine factory, also briefly called Henschel, began building its first vehicles as early as 1899. The factory was located at Schillerstraße 97 in the city of Charlottenburg, today a district of Berlin. After Daimler, they were the second company to launch a motorized cab in Berlin in 1899. The bus was designed for six to eight passengers. The first electrically powered taxi in Berlin was built by Henschel still on a carriage. The battery box hung in an iron frame beneath the body. The motor, which was also mounted there, drove the rear wheels via flexible shafts and chains. The flexible waves were a specialty of the company, which in its department I dealt with devices for working with metal, wood, and stone.

The Henschel taxi/bus from the department II had a range of 45 km and was in use in Berlin for many years. Around 1900, electric trucks also followed, each equipped with two electric motors on the rear axle. The hub motors for powering the vehicle had 3.5 hp each, and the more powerful motors had 6.5 hp. The electric truck could be electrically shifted in five speeds. A block brake and two mechanical brakes served as brakes. In addition, in an emergency, a strong braking could be initiated through the recuperation of the two electric motors. Henschel was able to produce larger quantities of these electric trucks in the field of municipal vehicles up until the time of the First World War. A three-seater passenger car in phaeton style for up to three passengers could also be purchased. The phaeton fitted with pneumatic tires reached a top speed of 25 km/h. The best energy consumption for electric vehicles during the comparative drive of the Central European Motor Vehicle Association was achieved by a Henschel vehicle with 60 to 65 watt-hours per ton-kilometer, together with a vehicle from the company Scheele. Over the years, commercial vehicles with gasoline or petroleum engines were also added. In a branch plant with access to the banks of the Spree, motorboats were manufactured. The boat was also equipped with a flexible shaft, allowing it to easily have a watertight hull, be powered, and be controlled at the same time. In 1918, the company was taken over by the Elite-Werke.

== Technical data ==
- Henschel Omnibus / Taxi range 45 km
- Henschel electric truck, 3.5 hp or 6.5 hp engine, system hp 7 hp or 13 hp
- commercial vehicles with gasoline or petroleum engines
- Henschel motorboat
