= Steudel =

Steudel is a surname, and refers to the following:

- Ernst Gottlieb von Steudel (1783–1856), German physician and an authority on grasses
- Helga Steudel (born 1939), German former motorcyclist and car racer
- Johann Christian Friedrich Steudel (1779–1837), German Lutheran theologian
- Johann Heinrich Steudel (1825–1891), Austrian politician
- Ralf Steudel (1937–2021), German chemist and author
- Steudel-Werke, early 20th century German car maker
- Wilhelm Steudel (1829–1903), German entomologist
