= Asdomobil =

- Industry: Automotive
- Founded: 1913; 113 years ago
- Founder: Alfred Schwefringhaus
- Defunct: 1914; 112 years ago
- Headquarters: Düsseldorf, Germany
- Products: Cars

The Asdomobil in Düsseldorf was a German company that produced cars in 1913 and 1914.

== History ==
From 1911, Alfred Schwefringhaus took over the import of Foden Trucks from England to Germany. The engineer Alfred Schwefringhaus from Düsseldorf-Oberkassel introduced a three-wheeled delivery van in 1913. The van, with two front wheels in a front-steering design and a single rear wheel, appeared under the brand name Asdomobil. The brand name Asdomobil is a combination of the initials AS from Alfred Schwefringhaus and the first letters of his place of residence in Düsseldorf-Oberkassel. A water-cooled four-stroke engine drove the rear wheel via a five-speed gearbox and a driveshaft. The open driver's compartment provided space for one person. Behind it was a box body for cargo. Next to the van, there was a nearly identical passenger car, also as a three-wheeler. Steam cars have also been produced in small numbers by Asdomobil. In 1914, a new logo for the company was designed. It consisted of the word 'Schwef', a ring, and a house, a play on the surname Schwefringhaus. The production of vehicles ended in the year 1914.

Alfred Schwefringhaus had published an article on the profitability of trucks.

== Technical data ==
Three-wheeled vehicles with a water-cooled four-stroke single-cylinder engine. The 6 hp engine came from De Dion-Bouton, specifically the De Dion-Bouton Type DE 1. The engine had a displacement of 720 cc with a bore of 84 mm and a stroke of 130 mm. The De Dion-Bouton was only produced for a few months and discontinued in 1912 without a successor. It was the last model from this manufacturer with a single-cylinder engine.

The Asdomobil had a gearbox with five gears. Propshaft to the rear axle. Front steering.
