= AG für Akkumulatoren- und Automobilbau =

AG für Akkumulatoren- und Automobilbau was a Prussian German automobile manufacturer based in Wedding (Berlin), Ofenerstrasse and founded by Alex Fischer who built electric powered automobiles from 1919 to 1922 under the brand name AAA (not related to the French brand of the same name).

== History ==
From 1922, the electric vehicles were given the brand name Elektric. In the same year, the company started the production of small cars with gasoline built-in engines. These were distributed under the name Alfi.

The factory was founded in 1919 as Automobil- und Akkumulatorenbau GmbH for electric vehicles. In 1920, the name was changed to Auto- und Akkumulatorenfabrik Aktiengesellschaft (AAA), which remained in place until 1922.

The commercial vehicle factory for electric vehicles, which existed until 1925, was continued from 1922 with the company name Aktiengesellschaft für Akkuulatoren- und Automobilbau.

AAA was the first German company to build four-wheel drive cars. Production ended in 1925 when the company went bankrupt.

This well-known commercial vehicle factory is often confused with the accumulator factory AG, which was also located in Berlin, Asländischer Platz 3 from 1918 to 1936. Electric vehicles with a payload of 1.5 to 2 tons were also manufactured there under the Afa brand, which were used as milk trucks, among other things.

== Vehicles ==
Vans and parcel delivery vans were produced for a payload of 0.6 to 2 tons. These commercial vehicles were equipped with an 8.5 hp electric motor, which was installed swinging in the spring-loaded frame with the front. The range of the two built types was 60 km.

The type AAA had as a van a short bonnet, which rose diagonally. The spoke wheels were covered with solid rubber and the body was manufactured as required. Some of the electric vehicles had a front-facing windshield on the passenger side, the cab side was open.

Another commercial vehicle was the type AGA.
