= Sablatnig-Beuchelt =

The Sablatnig-Beuchelt was a German automobile manufactured from 1925 until 1926. A 1496 cc four-cylinder designed by Sablatnig, it was similar to many other German cars of the early 1920s.
