= Komet (German automobile) =

German automobile in early 1900s

The Komet was a German automobile manufactured from 1922 until 1924 by Komet Autofabrik Buchmann & Co of Leisnig. Later made by another company as the Kenter, this vehicle had a 1060 cc Steudel-Werke engine.

engine.
