= Wilhelm Steudel =

German physician and entomologist (1829–1903)

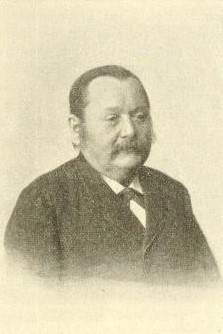

Wilhelm Steudel (1829, Oberurbach – 1903, Stuttgart) was a German physician, ornithologist and entomologist who specialised in Lepidoptera. He described the moth Rhigognostis incarnatella (Steudel, 1873) as Eine neue Plutella – Entomologische Zeitung Stettin 34: 340 - 342. His other papers were published in Jahreshefte des Vereins für vaterländische Naturkunde in Württemberg. Steudel was a member of the Entomological Society of Stettin. His collection of Palearctic microlepidoptera is curated by the State Museum of Natural History Stuttgart.
