= Freibahn =

German motor manufacturer

- Industry: Mechanical engineering
- Founded: 1905; 121 years ago
- Founder: Arthur Koppel
- Defunct: 1910; 116 years ago
- Headquarters: Spandau, Germany
- Products: steam engines, automobiles

Freibahn was a German steam engine manufacturer, based in Spandau, Germany. The company name Freibahn means 'free railway' or 'not track-bound'.

== History ==
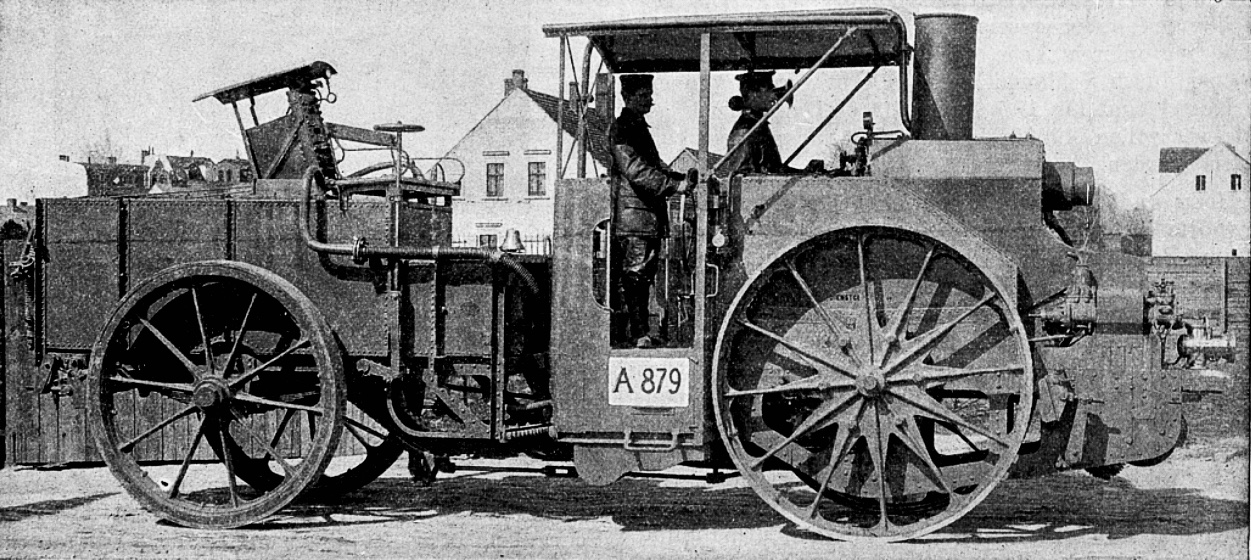
Freibahn GmbH steam engine 12.5 t (1907)

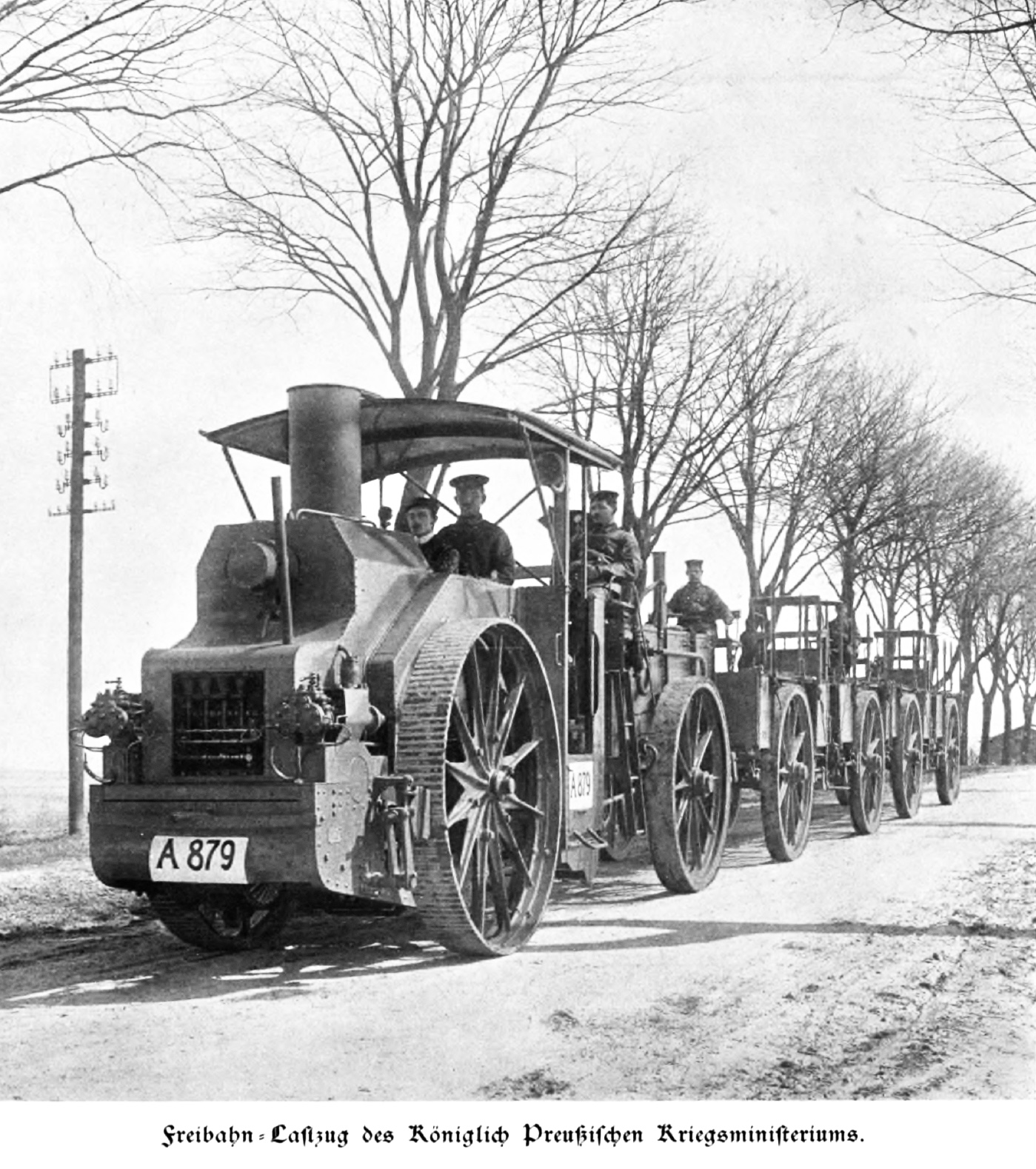
Freibahn GmbH steam-powered freight train 12.5 t with four single-axle trailers

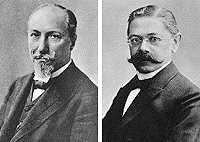
Arthur Koppel & Benno Orenstein

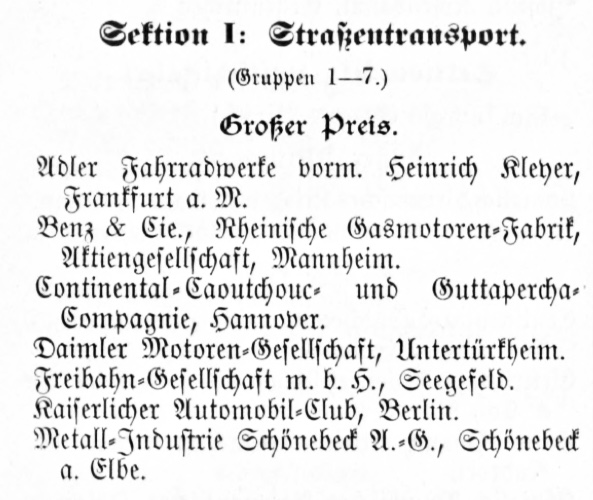
International fair in Milan in 1906

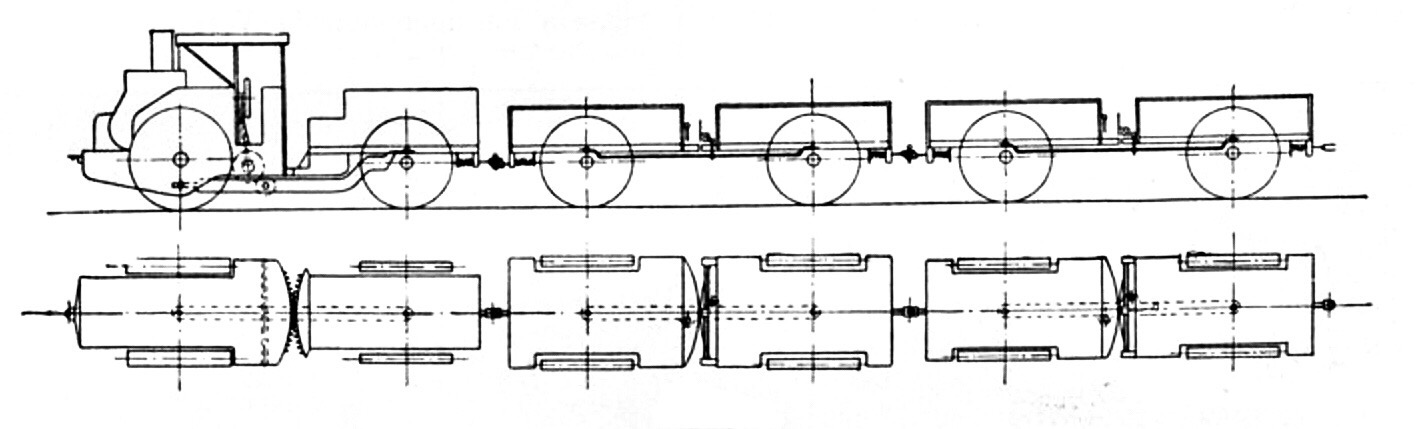
Freibahn with two double trailers

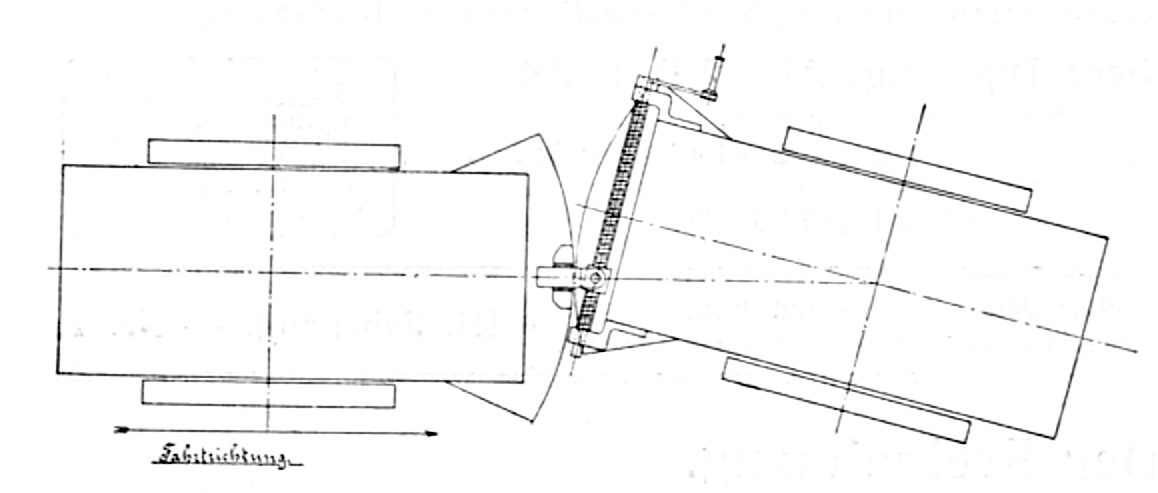
Turning circle optimization Freibahn double trailer

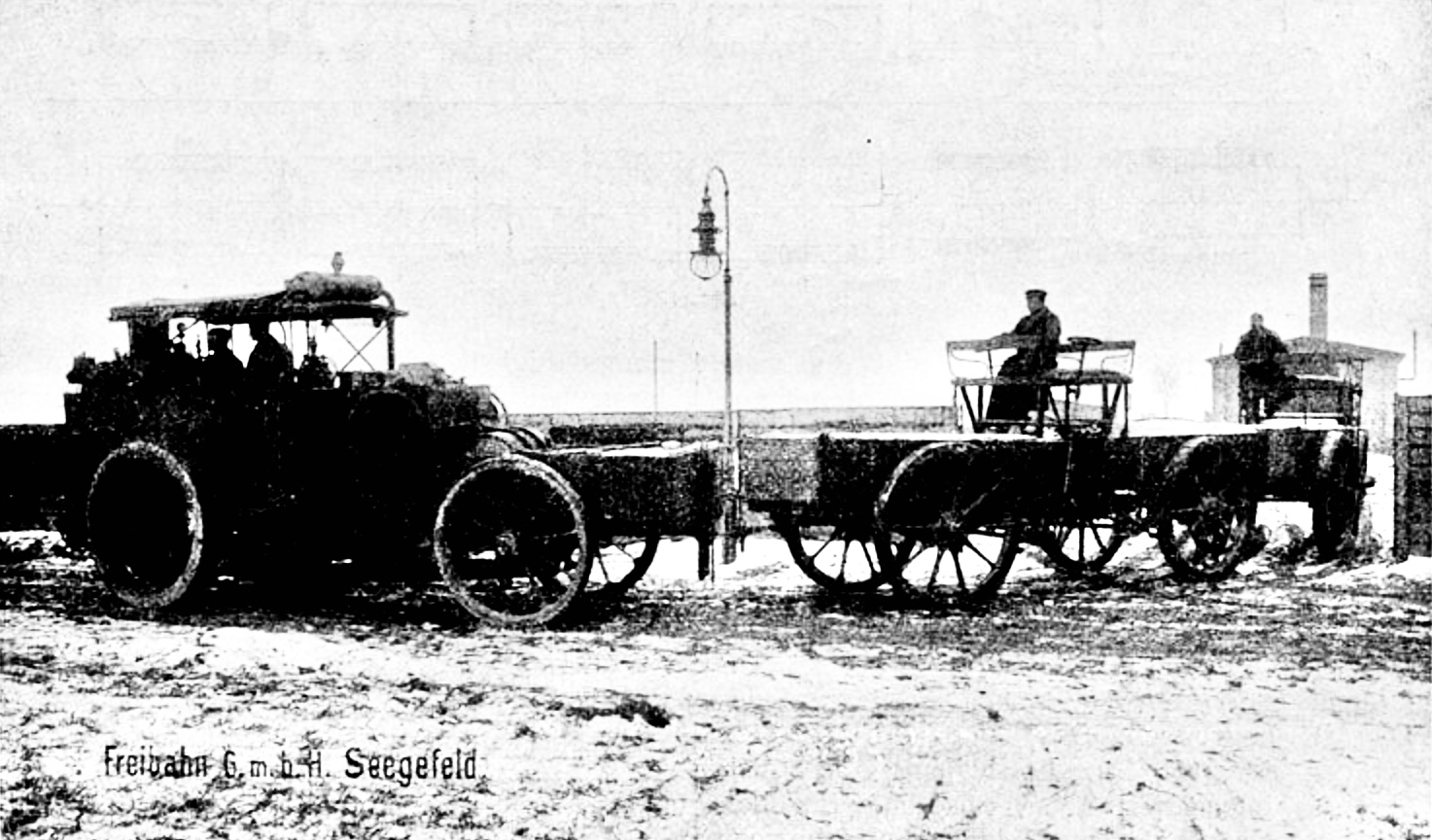
Turning circle optimization Freibahn double trailer in real

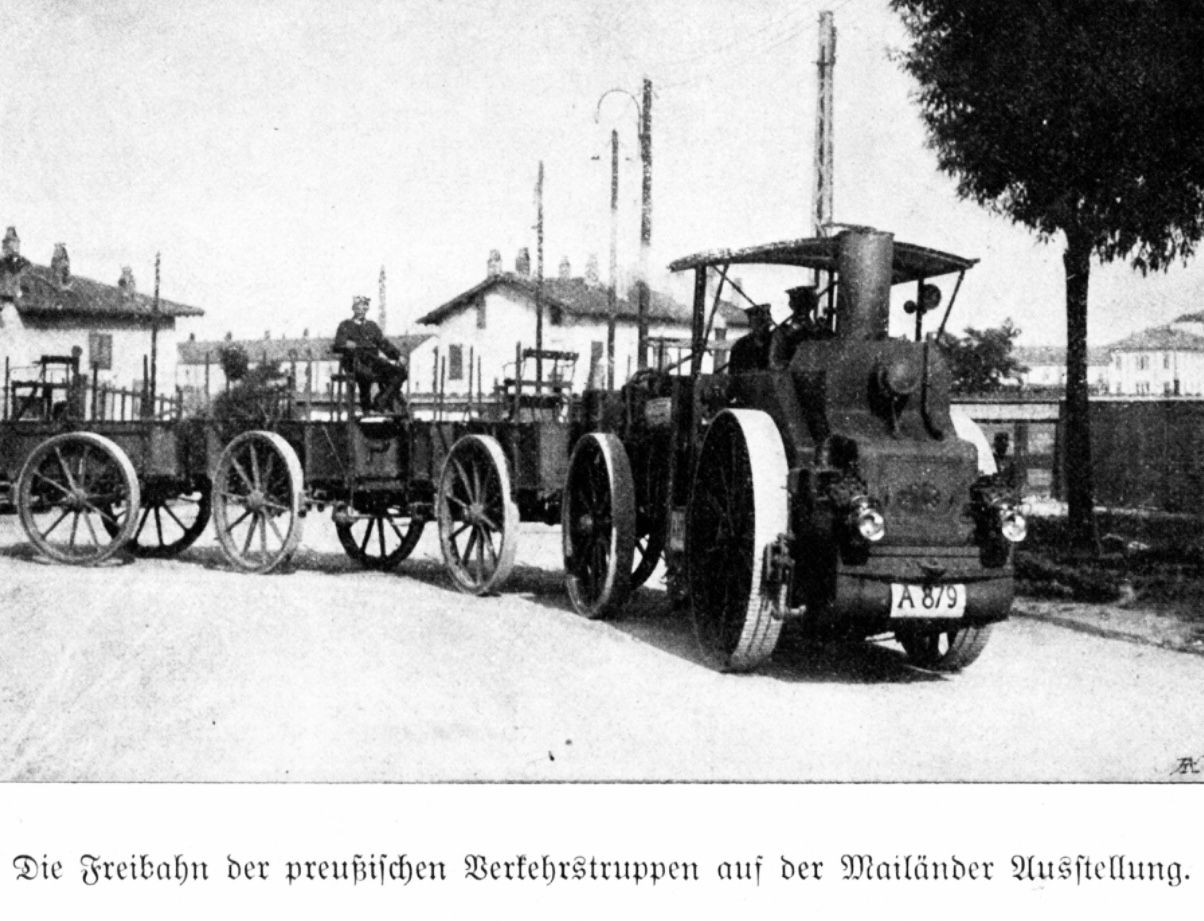
Freibahn in Milan (1906)

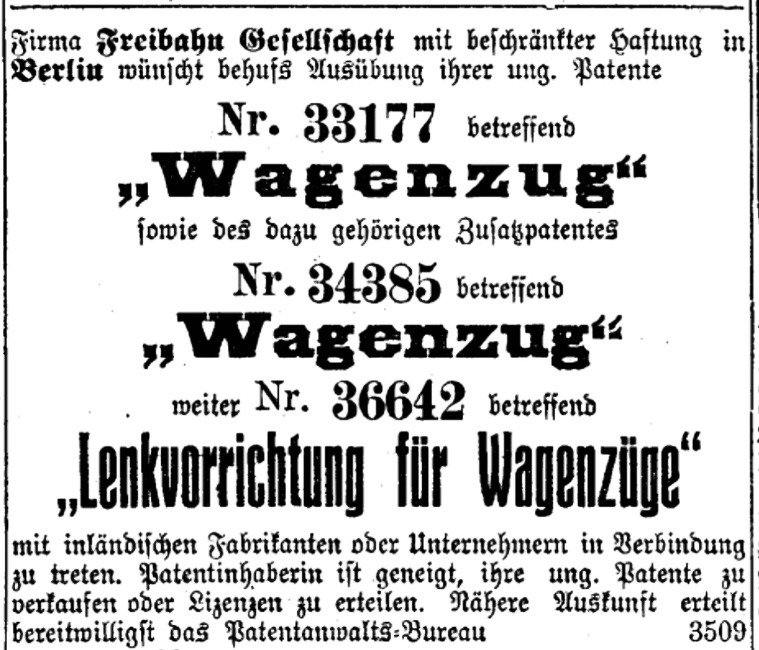
Freibahn patent (1909)

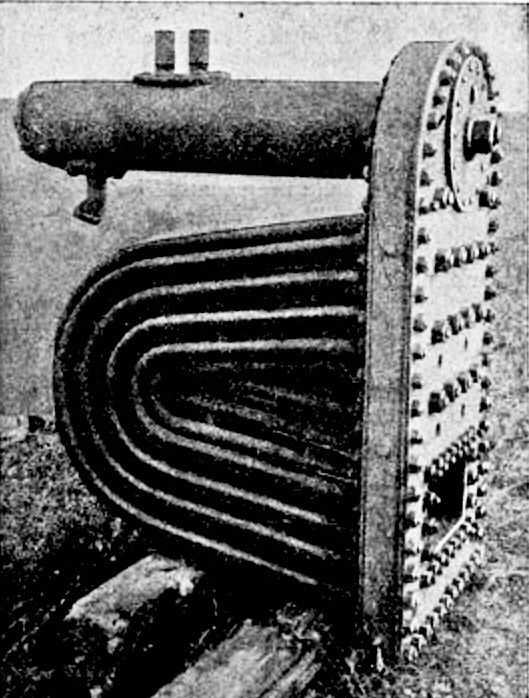
Steam generator Freibahn

The company was founded by Arthur Koppel, who had previously co-founded the company Orenstein & Koppel (O&K for short) together with Benno Orenstein. It was originally a purely trading company for narrow-gauge railways, selling railway tracks and tipper wagons. In 1876, Benno Orenstein contributed 3,000 marks as a loan from an uncle. Arthur Koppel, a former authorized officer of the G. E. Dellschau iron trading company, contributed 15,000 marks. The company initially developed relatively slowly, and in 1885 the two partners amicably parted ways. They divided their market into foreign and domestic regions for five years, and Koppel founded the company Arthur Koppel GmbH, which remained more successful abroad. At the end of 1905, the separately run sales operations were merged again.

The Imperial German Army had decided very late to motorize the troops. For a long time, they relied on horses. The decisive breakthrough came from the observations of the French, who in the autumn of 1903 tested a road truck from the company Société Française des Trains Renard. This truck was capable of moving heavy artillery and equipment on roads as well as off-road. German generals promoted the rapid construction of a comparable motorized train. Corresponding tenders were sent to the industry. Arthur Koppel was very interested in such a military contract and hoped to convince the Prussian Artillery Testing Commission with his design. The mechanical engineer Erich Wendeler, who later worked for Hanomag, designed the huge street steam locomotive for Arthur Koppel, which was developed at Freibahn GmbH in Spandau-Seegefeld near Berlin. Until the completion of the new open-track factory in Seegefeld near Spandau, the machine factory "Cyclop" Mehlis and Behrens, Berlin, Pankstraße 15, built the locomotives, which rolled under their own steam to Seegefeld for completion. The trailers were supplied by Arthur Koppel AG until the end of production. The production of the steam vehicles took place at the Berlin Locomotive and Machine Factory, formerly L. Schwarzkopf. At the international fair in Milan in 1906, a grand prize in the category of road transport was awarded to the Freibahn company. In 1908, the steam engine was replaced by a gasoline engine. Attempts to use the vehicles in agriculture were unsuccessful. Ultimately, the tests and sales were unsatisfactory, which led to the company's dissolution in 1910.

== Products ==
- train with six axles
- train with four axles

The weight of the six-axle train is composed as follows: locomotive with 7000 kg, tender with 5000 kg, four trailers empty weight 7200 kg, load 16000 kg, total train weight 35,200 kg. The train length is 18 m. The steam engine produces 30 hp and allows travel speeds of 8 km/h. When unloaded, speeds of up to 12 km/h are possible. The wheels have a diameter of 1800 mm and the track gauge was 1630 mm. The tank holds 800 liters of tar oil as fuel. The water tank holds 1,500 liters of water, which is usually enough for 6 to 8 hours of driving. The tank provides a range of about 100 km. The purchase costs for such a train are 50,000 marks. Operating the road locomotive requires two to three people: the machinist, the driver, and, if necessary, the conductor. In extremely difficult road conditions, a winch mounted at the front of the vehicle can be used with a 60 m cable.

A double trailer can, if needed, move a central nut using a hand crank, thereby allowing the individual trailers to move relative to each other. This reduces the turning radius to about 6 to 7 meters.
