= Äskulap =

German company

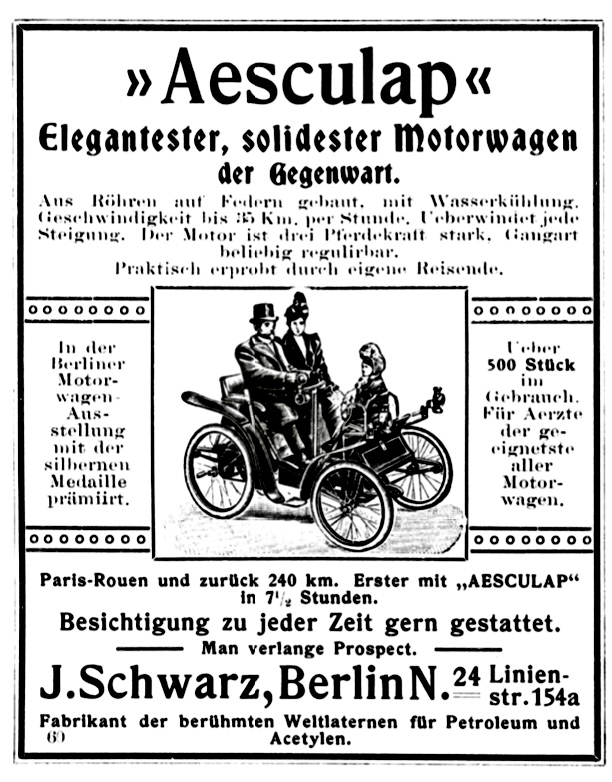
- Industry: Automotive
- Founded: 1900; 126 years ago
- Founder: Ignaz Schwarz
- Defunct: 1901; 125 years ago
- Headquarters: Berlin, Germany
- Products: Cars

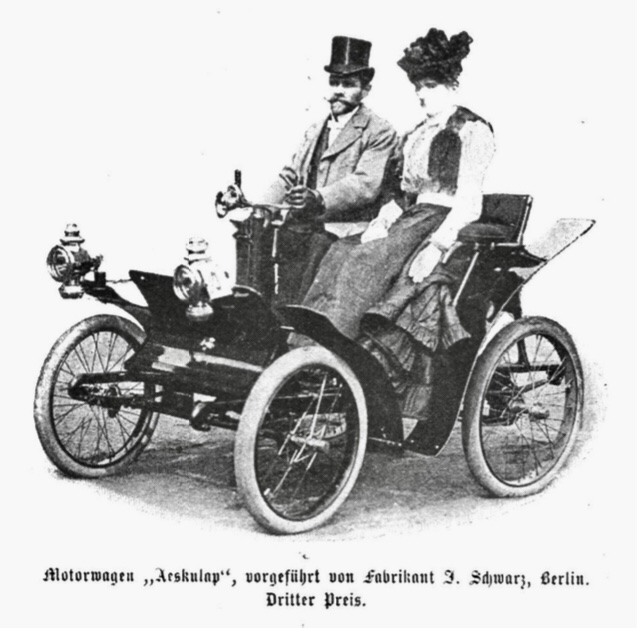
Äskulap Voiturette

The Äskulap in Berlin was a German company that produced cars in 1900 and 1901.

== History ==
Around 1890, there were about forty machine factories in Berlin. One of them was the company of Ignaz Schwarz at Linienstrasse 154a in the Prenzlauer Berg district. The Schwarz factory was known for the production of lighting that was powered by kerosene or acetylene. From 1900 to 1901, motor vehicles were also produced there for the company's most interesting target group, the doctors. For this reason, the vehicles were called Aesculap, in reference to the god of healing in Greek mythology.

Among similar brand names, Aesculap (from Vienna) and Esculape (from Paris), comparable vehicles with similar brand names emerged around the same time. Whether there was a connection between these three brands is unclear.

According to an advertisement from 1900, about 500 automobiles had already been produced. In this ad, the company name is given as J. Schwarz, which suggests a change within the family.

A vehicle participated in a Paris-Rouen race in 1900, which covered a distance of 240 km. The car took 7.5 hours as the winner.

== Technical data ==
The motor vehicles were equipped with rear-mounted single-cylinder engines from De Dion-Bouton with an output of 3 hp. It has an 80 mm bore, 80 mm stroke, and 402 cm^{3} displacement. It produces around 3 HP at 1500 rpm. The first use of this engine was the De Dion-Bouton Type D model from 1899. The engine was water-cooled. The vehicle was offered as a two-seater or as a four-seater in a vis-à-vis configuration. The vehicle frame was made of tubes. The top speed was 35 km/h.
