= Staunau =

The Staunau was a German automobile manufactured from 1950 until 1951.

Karl-Heinz Staunau was an entrepreneur from Hamburg-Harburg who had enjoyed some success as a manufacturer of commercial machines for ice cream and bakery businesses during the years following the war. By the late 1940s he had set his sights on a larger share of the Wirtschaftswunder (West German economic miracle) that was to become a feature of post-war reconstruction. With the help of a former aircraft engineer Staunau developed in a few months a small two door four seater fastback bodied car to a point where he said it was ready for production.

The design combined a crude but modern looking body with the front-wheel drive running gear from a DKW and an engine from Ilo, a major manufacturer of motor-bike engines. The resulting 389 cc 2-cylinder 2-stroke powered Staunau Type K400 used a three speed manual transmission and was spectacularly underdeveloped and underpowered, but very competitively priced. The same body was used for the more powerful Staunau Type K750 which employed a four speed manual transmission and was powered by a 748cc 2-cylinder 2-stroke motor. Claimed power outputs for the two version were respectively 9.5 kW (13 PS) and 18 kW (25 PS) which were said to allow for top speeds of 92 km/h (57 mph) and 105 km/h (65 mph). By the time the end came, the company had manufactured 64 of the Type K400s and 16 Type K750s. The English writer and distinguished automobile historian David Burgess-Wise describes the Staunau automobile as "probably one of the worst small cars ever made after World War II."

In a previous career Staunau had been an expert in advertising, and reports started to appear that the US Chrysler Corporation was keen to incorporate the Staunau cars into its range for a future European sales programme. Many in the press were happy to disseminate these reports. More disturbingly many people were persuaded to part with their savings in order to invest in Staunau's business. When inevitable bankruptcy ensued, Karl-Heinz Staunau purchased a flight to South America, and so from the point of view of his German creditors, disappeared from view.
