= Ehrhardt (automobile) =

German-made car

The Ehrhardt was a German automobile manufactured from 1905 until 1924. The company was founded by Gustav Ehrhard, son of Heinrich Ehrhardt of Dixi. Its operations were centered at Zella St. Blasii and at Düsseldorf. Ehrhardts came in two- and four-cylinder models. The largest was a 7956 cc four-cylinder which had four-wheel brakes by 1913. After 1918, the factory produced a 40 hp four-cylinder and a 55 hp six-cylinder, both luxury cars with OHC engines.

Ehrhardt was succeeded in 1924 by Ehrhardt-Szawe.
