= Ehrhardt-Szawe =

The Ehrhardt-Szawe was a German automobile manufactured between 1924 and 1925. It was formed when Ehrhardt took over operations for the Szawe company of Berlin-Reinickendorf. The resulting car, a 2570cc 10/50 hp ohc six-cylinder, was designed without regard to cost; even its radiator was made of German silver.
