= Apollo (1910 automobile) =

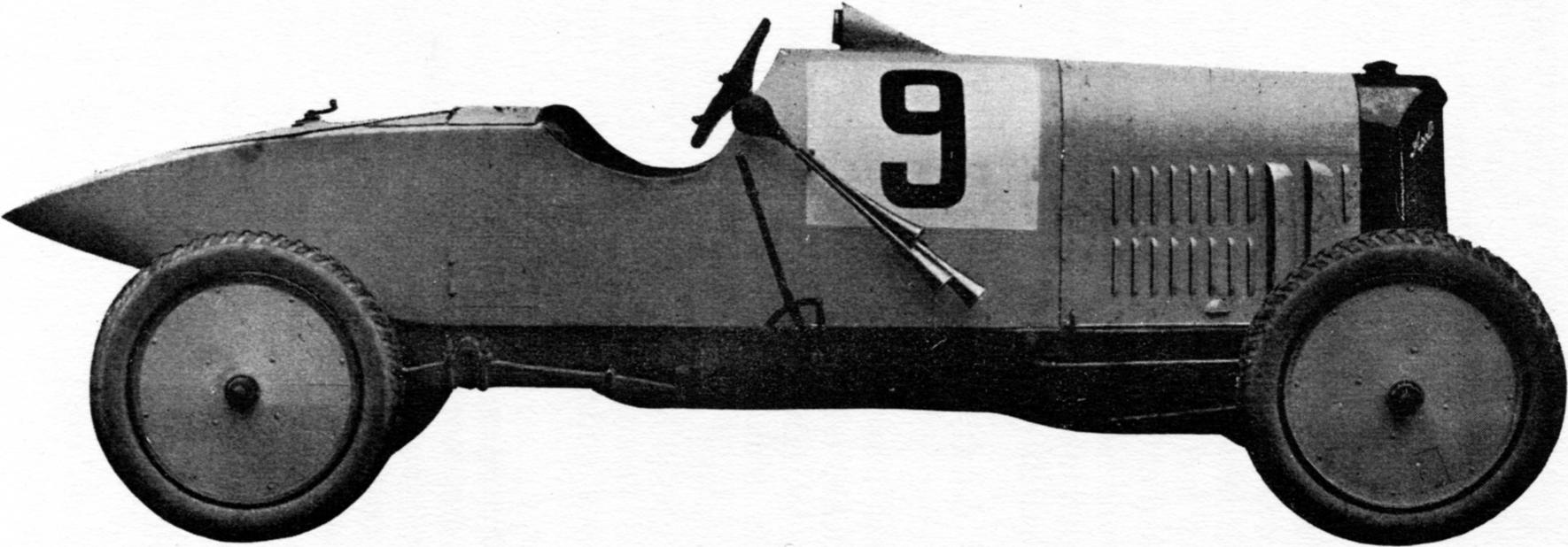
Illustration racing car "Apollo 30PS" from 1921

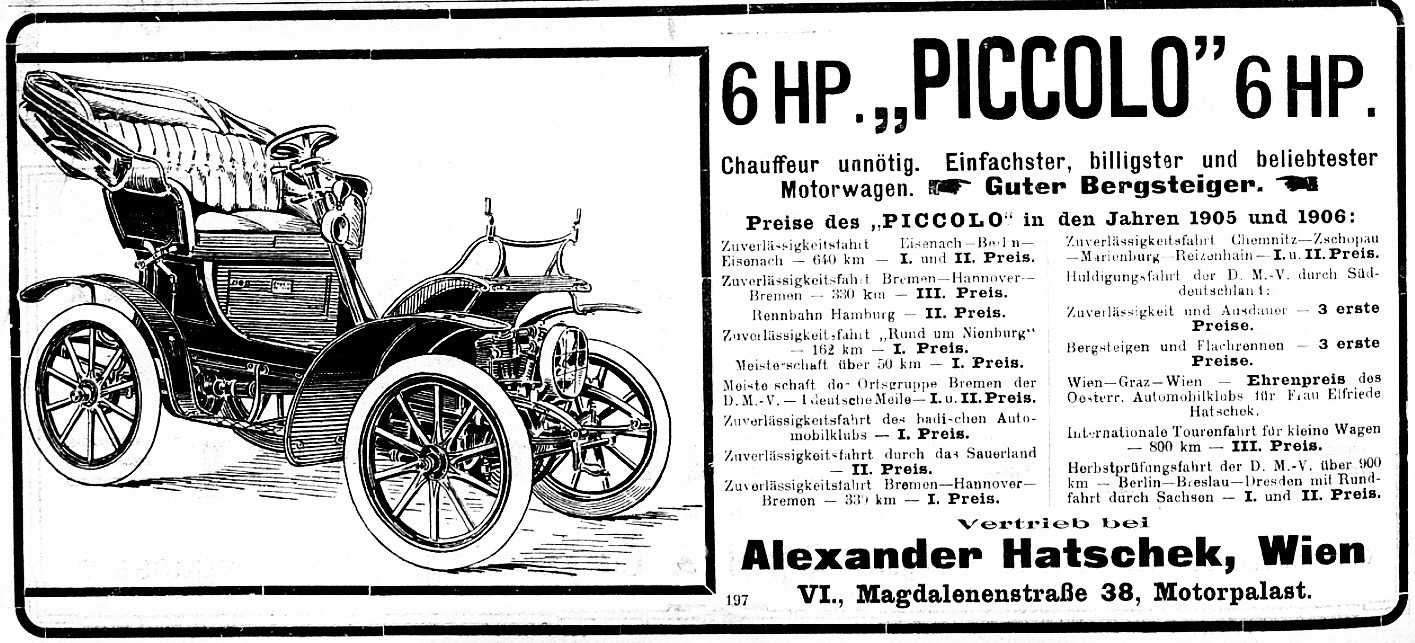
Piccolo 6 hp (1904-1907)

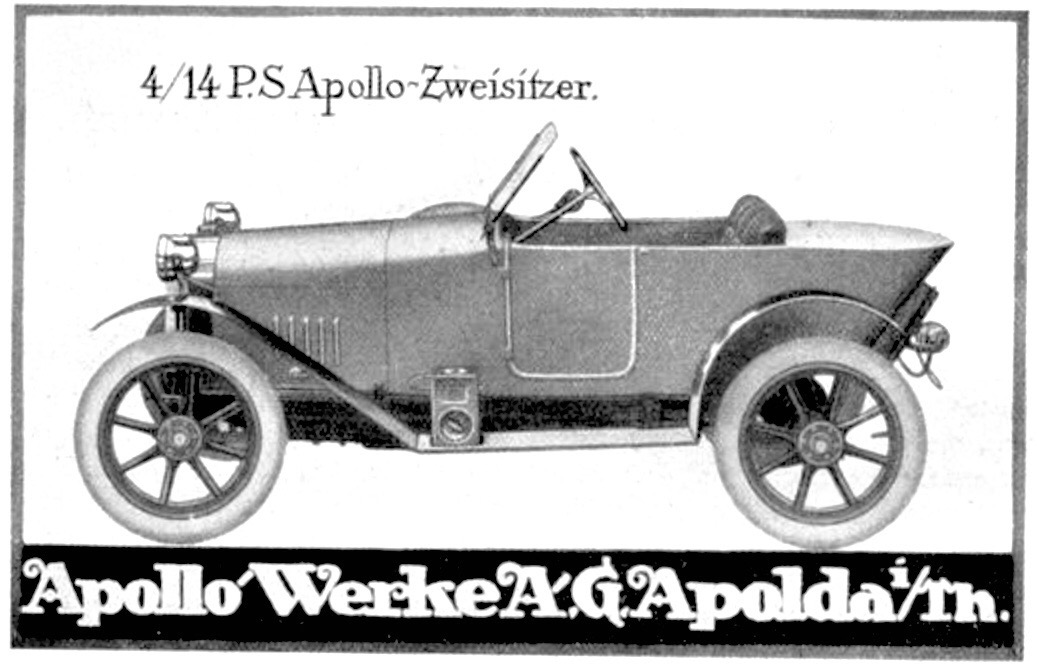
Apollo 4-14 (1921-1925)

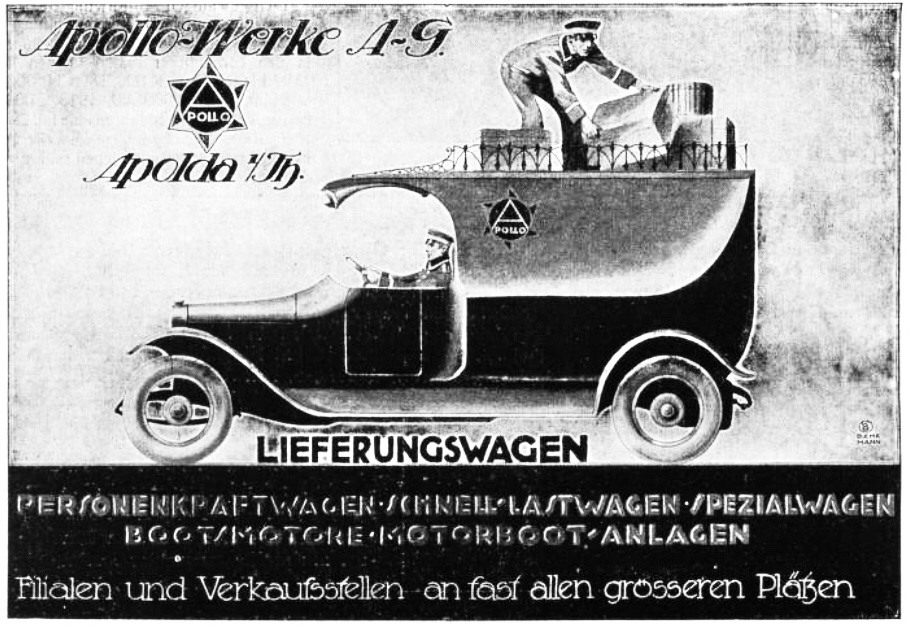
Apollo Werke AG (1918)

The Apollo was a German automobile manufactured by Ruppe & Son of Apolda in Thuringia from 1910 to 1927. The first Apollo was called the "Mobbel" and featured an air-cooled 624 cc single-cylinder IOE engine. The company also offered air-cooled 1608 cc in-line fours and a 1575 cc V-4. The company had also previously made a vehicle called the Piccolo.

== Models ==
Four separate cylinders inline powered the model "E" (1770 cc). The model "B", designed by racing driver Karl Slevogt, had an OHV 960 cc four-cylinder engine. Another of his creations had a 2040 cc OHV engine. Other Apollos had sidevalve four-cylinder engines of up to 3440 cc; some post-1920 models featured wishbone suspension.

The last cars produced by the company had OHV 1200 cc four-cylinder engines; some had sidevalve 1551 cc Steudel four-cylinder power units instead. The designer of two-stroke engines, Hugo Ruppe, was the factory founder's son; in 1920 Apollo took over his air-cooled MAF cars. During the mid-1920s, Slevogt raced cars of this marque with streamlined Jaray bodies.
