= Pawi (automobile) =

German automobile

The Pawi was a German automobile manufactured by Paul Wilke only in 1921. It had a 1598 cc four-cylinder engine, but enjoyed no commercial success.
