= Minor automotive manufacturing groups =

Regional or niche car manufacturers

There are many Automobile manufacturers that are mostly regional, or operating in niche markets. Smaller companies can survive by exploiting niche market opportunities, or stressing specialist characteristics. The list below are several examples of the "smaller" car companies.

Marque	Country
AC Cars(United Kingdom)
AC	(United Kingdom)
Aftab Automobiles (Bangladesh)
Aftab	(Bangladesh)
Agrale(Brazil)
Agrale	(Brazil)
Alexander Dennis(United Kingdom)
Alexander Dennis *	(United Kingdom)
Plaxton	(United Kingdom)
Alpina(Germany)
Alpina	(Germany)
Ariel Ltd(United Kingdom)
Ariel	(United Kingdom)
Ascari Cars(United Kingdom)
Ascari	(United Kingdom)
Askam Kamyon İmalat ve Ticaret AŞ (Turkey)
Askam	(Turkey)
Aston Martin Lagonda Limited (United Kingdom)
Aston Martin	(United Kingdom)
B Engineering (Italy)
Edonis	(Italy)
Bertone (Italy)
Bertone	(Italy)
Bohdan (Ukraine)
Bohdan	(Ukraine)
Bristol (United Kingdom)
Bristol	(United Kingdom)
Bufori Motor Car Company (Malaysia)
Bufori	(Malaysia)
Caterham (United Kingdom)
Caterham	(United Kingdom)
Coda(United States)
Coda	(United States)
Ceymo Automobile Manufacturers (Sri Lanka)
Ceymo	(Sri Lanka)
Dennis Eagle (United Kingdom)
Dennis	(United Kingdom)
DINA Camiones S.A. de C.V. (Mexico)
DINA	(Mexico)
Donkervoort Automobielen (Netherlands)
Donkervoort	(Netherlands)
DR Motor Company (Italy)
DR	(Italy)
Electron corporation (Ukraine)
Electron	(Ukraine)
Elfin Sports Cars (Australia)
Elfin	(Australia)
Fisker Automotive(United States)
Fisker	(United States)
Force Motors Ltd (India)
Force	(India)
Fornasari (Italy)
Fornasari	(Italy)
Ginetta Cars(United Kingdom)
Ginetta	(United Kingdom)
Grecav (Italy)
Grecav	(Italy)
Guangzhou Automobile Industry Group (People's Republic of China)
Guangzhou	(China)
Gumpert (Germany)
Gumpert	(Germany)
Hindustan Motors (India)
Hindustan	(India)
IKCO (Iran)
Iran Khodro	(Iran)
Isdera (Germany)
Isdera	(Germany)
Jetcar (Germany)
Jetcar	(Germany)
KAMAZ (Russia)
KAMAZ	(Russia)
Kutaisi Automotive Plant (Georgia)
KAZ	(Georgia (country))
Koenigsegg (Sweden)
Koenigsegg	(Sweden)
KrAZ (Ukraine)
KrAZ	(Ukraine)
Landwind (China)
Landwind	(China)
LAZ (Ukraine)
LAZ	(Ukraine)
Loremo (Germany)
Loremo	(Germany)
March 30th Works(North Korea)
?	(North Korea)
Marcopolo S.A.(Brazil)
Marcopolo	(Brazil)
Mastrettadesign Tecnoidea S.A. de C.V. (Mexico)
Mastretta	(Mexico)
MAZ (Belarus)
MAZ	(Belarus)
McLaren Automotive (United Kingdom)
McLaren	(United Kingdom)
Micro Cars (Sri Lanka)
Micro	(Sri Lanka)
Mitsuoka Motors (Japan)
Mitsuoka	(Japan)
Morgan Motor Company (United Kingdom)
Morgan	(United Kingdom)
National Electric Vehicle Sweden (Sweden)
Saab	(Sweden)
Noble Automotive (United Kingdom)
Noble	(United Kingdom)
Optare Group, Ltd(United Kingdom)
Optare	(United Kingdom)
Orca (Liechtenstein)
Orca	(Liechtenstein)
Pagani Automobili S.p.A. (Italy)
Pagani	(Italy)
PAZ (Russia)
PAZ	(Russia)
Panoz (United States)
Panoz	(United States)
Perodua (Malaysia)
Perodua	(Malaysia)
Pininfarina S.p.A. (Italy)
Pininfarina	(Italy)
Proto Motors (South Korea)
Proto	(South Korea)
Pragoti (Bangladesh)
Pragoti	(Bangladesh)
Pyeonghwa Motors (North Korea)
Pyeonghwa	(North Korea)
Pyongsang(North Korea)
Pyongsang	(North Korea)
Reva (India)
Reva	(India)
SAIPA (Iran)
SAIPA	(Iran)
SeAZ (Russia)
SeAZ	(Russia)
Shaanxi Automobile Group (China)
Shaanxi	(China)
Shijiazhuang Shuanghuan Automobile Co (China)
Shuanghuan	(China)
Sin Cars (Germany)
Sin	(Germany)
Spyker N.V. (Netherlands)
Spyker	(Netherlands)
Sungri(North Korea)
Sungri	(North Korea)
TD2000 (Malaysia)
TD2000	(Malaysia)
Tomcar Australia (Australia)
Tomcar Australia	(Australia)
Tofaş (Turkey)
Fiat	(Turkey)
TVR Motors Company, Ltd(United Kingdom)
TVR	(United Kingdom)
Wiesmann (Germany)
Wiesmann	(Germany)
Wrightbus (United Kingdom)
Wrightbus	(United Kingdom)
Yes! Roadster (Germany)
Yes!	(Germany)
Venturi (Monaco)
Venturi	(Monaco)
ZAZ (Ukraine)
ZAZ	(Ukraine)
