= List of automobile manufacturers of Asia =

This is a list of notable and current automobile manufacturers with articles on Wikipedia by country. It is a subset of the list of automobile manufacturers for manufacturers based in Asian countries.

== Azerbaijan ==
- AzSamand
- Ganja Auto Plant
- Nakhchivan Automobile Plant

== China ==
- Aiways
- Arcfox
- BAIC
- Baojun
- Bisu
- Bordrin
- Brilliance
- BYD
- Byton
- Changan
- Changfeng Automobile
- Chery
- Denza
- Dongfeng
- Englon
- Exeed
- FAW
- GAC
- Fangchengbao
- Geely
- Great Wall
- Hafei
- Haima Automobile
- Haval
- Hawtai
- Higer
- Hongqi
- Bestune
- IM Motors
- JAC
- Jonway
- Karry
- King Long
- Lifan
- Li Auto
- Maxus
- Nio
- Ora
- Polarsun
- Qoros
- Roewe
- SAIC
- Seres Group
- Shuanghuan
- Venucia
- Weltmeister
- Wey
- Xiali
- Xiamen Golden Dragon
- Xinkai
- Xpeng
- Xiaomi
- Yutong
- Yangwang
- Zhidou
- Zinoro
- Zotye
- ZX

== India ==
- Force
- Mahindra & Mahindra
- Tata
- Ashok Leyland
- Maruti Suzuki
- Eicher Motors Limited
- Hero Motors
- TVS
- OLA
- Bajaj
- BharatBenz
- Royal Enfield
- Hindustan Motors
- Ather Energy
- Ultraviolette
- Vinfast
- Skoda
- Volkswagen
- ISUZU

== Indonesia ==
- Esemka
- Pindad

== Iran ==
* Fath
- Iran Khodro
- SAIPA

== Israel ==
- Tomcar
- Zibar

== Japan ==
- Acura
- Aspark
- Daihatsu
- Fuso
- Honda
- Hino Motors
- Infiniti
- Isuzu
- Jatco
- Kawasaki
- Lexus
- Mazda
- Mazdaspeed
- Mitsubishi
- Nissan
- Subaru
- Suzuki
- Toyota
- UD Trucks
- Vemac
- Yamaha

== Malaysia ==
- Bufori
- Perodua
- Proton
- TD2000

== North Korea ==
- Pyeonghwa
- Sungri

== Philippines ==
- Francisco Motors Corporation
- Sarao Motors

== South Korea ==
- Alpheon
- CT&T
- Daewoo
- Genesis Motor
- Hyundai
- KG Mobility
- KGM Commercial
- Kia
- Renault Samsung
- Spirra
- SsangYong
- Woojin Industrial Systems

== Taiwan ==
- CMC
- Hotai Motor
- Foxtron
- Kuozui Motors
- Luxgen
- Tobe
- Thunder Power
- Yulon Motor

== Turkey ==
- BMC
- Karsan
- Otokar
- TEMSA
- Togg

== United Arab Emirates ==
- W Motors - Founded in Lebanon before moving to Dubai
- NIMR (vehicle manufacturer)

== Vietnam ==
* VinFast

== See also ==
- List of automobile manufacturers
- List of automobile marques
