= Jetcar =

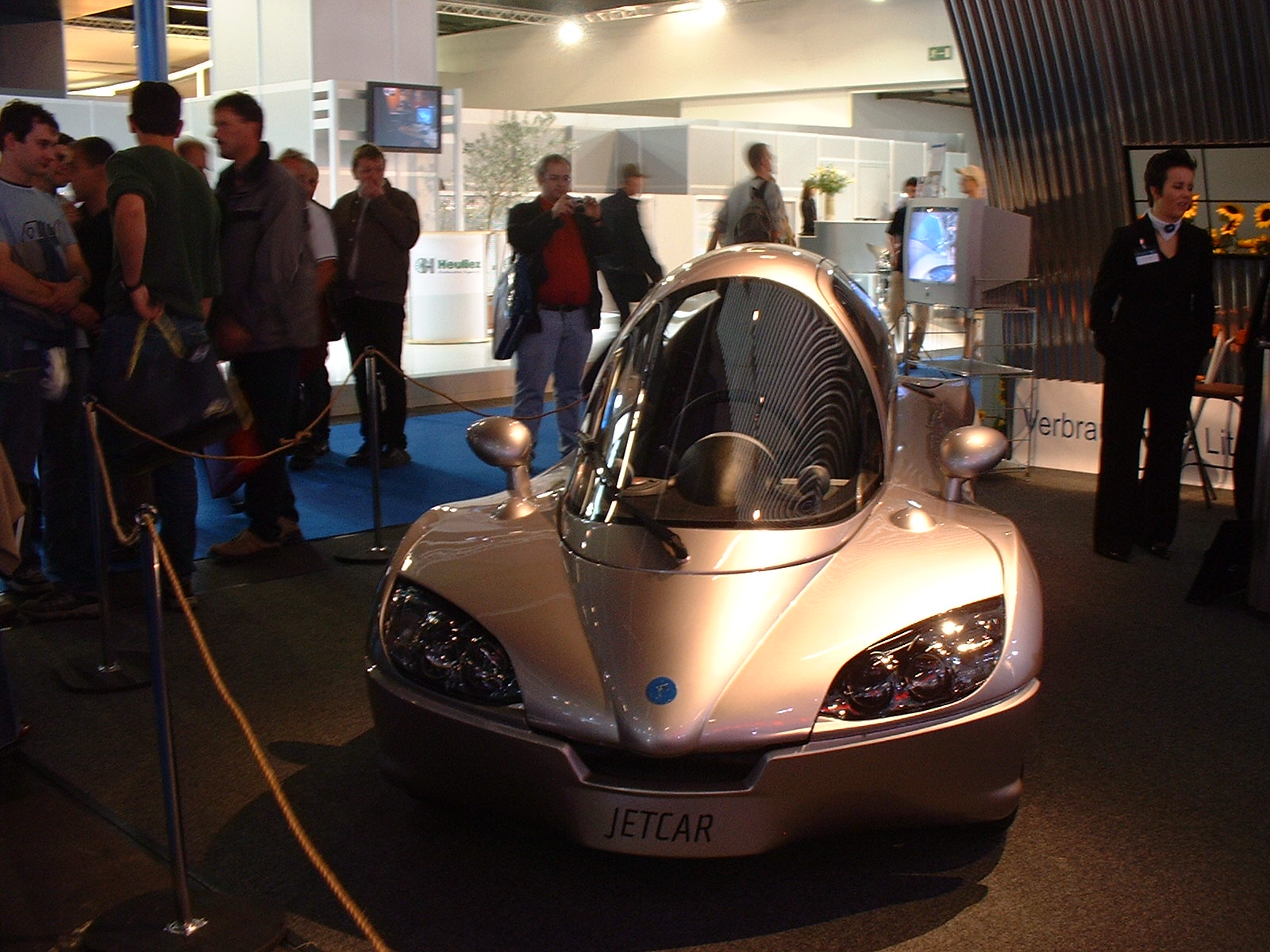
- Headquarters: Germany

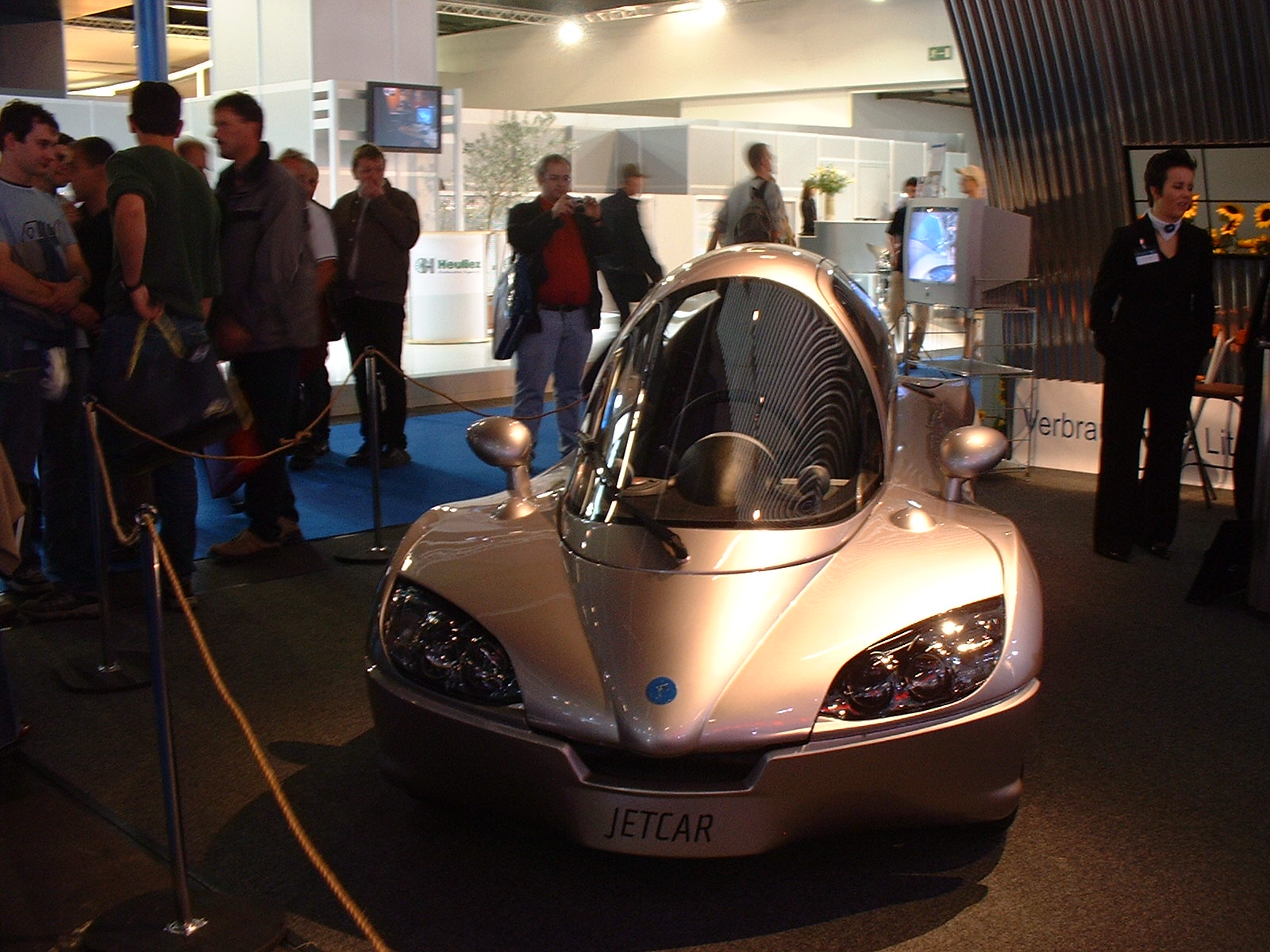
Jetcar 2.5

Jetcar is a brand of small car manufactured by Jetcar Zukunftsfahrzeug GmbH in Neuruppin, Germany. The company was established in 2000. The car has two seats, with the passenger sitting behind the driver. It is built using carbon fibre and costs between 48,000 and 58,000 euros including taxes in Germany The manufacturer has a limited production of the vehicle to 100 cars. The car consumed 2.8l of diesel per 100 kilometers (82miles per US gallon) during an official TÜV test. Top speed for the car is 160 km/h (100mp/hr). The driver's seat looks similar to a cockpit, which may be the reason for the car's name. The engine is the diesel engine from a Smart (car).

Due to its length of over 4 meters, it does not qualify as a Kei car in Japan.

The company's website mentions the similarity of the seating arrangement to that of the Messerschmitt Kabinenroller and FMR Tg500. Like the Fritz Fend–designed cars, it is a highway microcar (or perhaps one should call the Jetcar a minicar) and therefore needs to have very low air drag. The manufacturer claims also to have used aircraft technology. The Jetcar is about twice as heavy, so the use of modern materials must have been more than compensated by much more demanding requirements in other areas.

Size of the car:

- Height: 135 cm (53.1 in)
- Length: 403 cm (158.7 in)
- Wheelbase: 260 cm (102.4 in)
- Width: 149 cm (58.7 in)
- Weight: 660 kg (1,455 lb)
