= Young Engineers Sportscar =

German automotive manufacturer

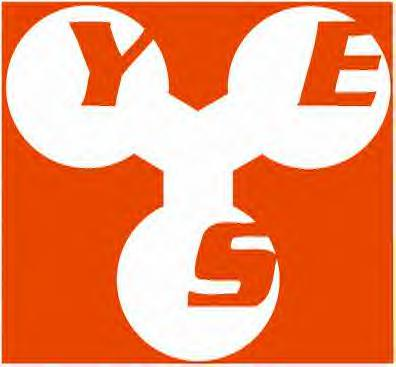

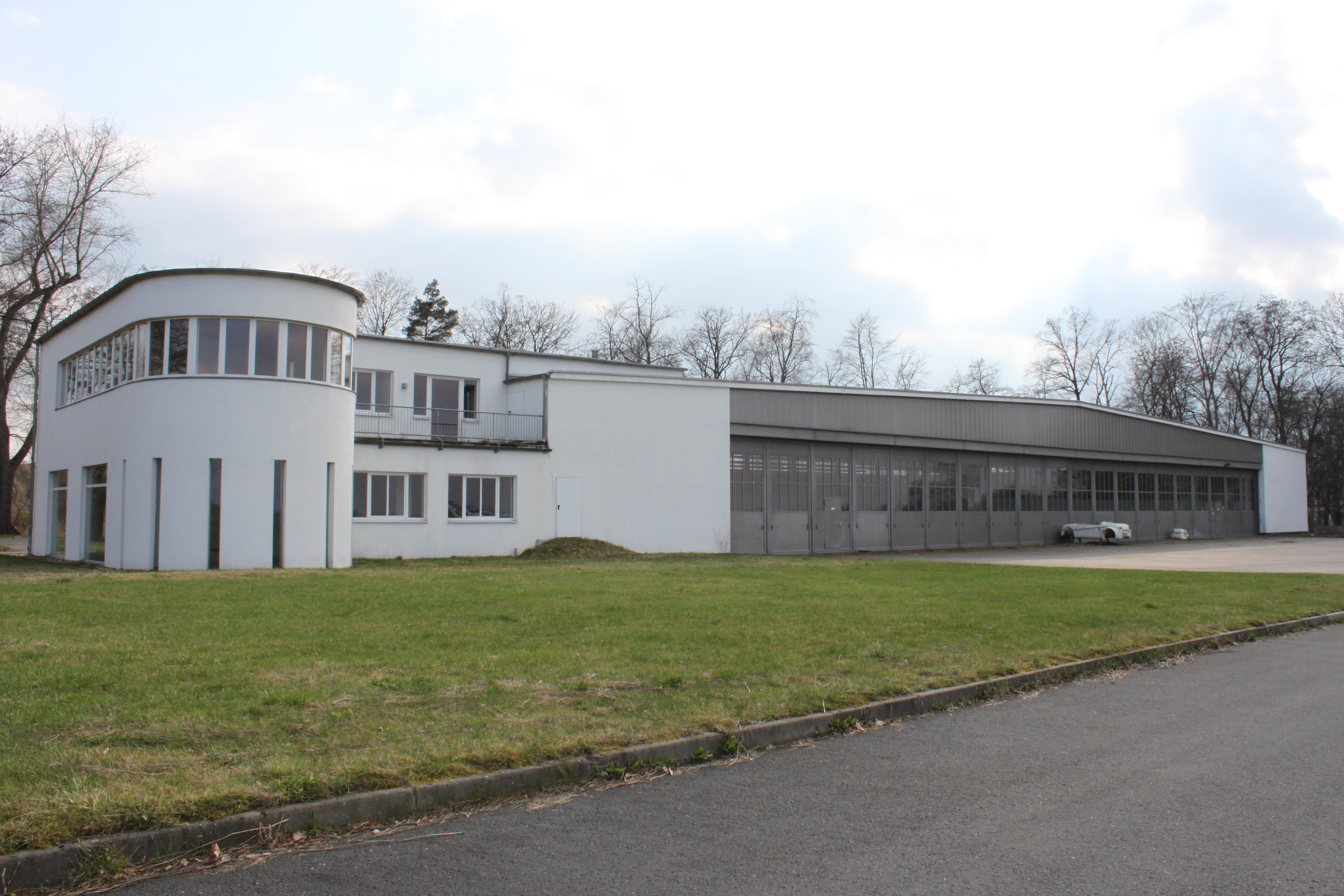
- Funke & Will AG manufacturing site after liquidation, 2010
- Industry: Automotive
- Founded: September 2000
- Founder: Herbert Funke; Philipp Will
- Defunct: April 2010
- Fate: Liquidation
- Headquarters: Großenhain, Germany
- Key people: Oliver Schweizer; Marco Kunz
- Parent: Funke & Will AG
- Website: www.yes.de (Dead link)

Yes! (Young Engineers Sportscar; stylized as YES!) was a brand of high-performance sports cars manufactured by Funke & Will AG in Germany.

== History ==
Herbert Funke & Philipp Will first designed the YES! sports car in their diploma thesis while attending Cologne University of Applied Sciences. The exterior design was developed by Oliver Schweizer. The first prototype was shown off at the Frankfurt Motor Show in 2001 as the YES! Clubsport. Starting in 2001, the YES! models were handmade in a restored hangar at the Großenhain airport.

In February 2009, Funke & Will AG filed for bankruptcy, which led to the liquidation of the company in April of that year. Marco Kunz, who was one of the first owners of the YES! Roadster 3.2, bought the assets of Yes! and founded YES! Beteiligungs- und Besitzgesellschaft mbH. Replacement parts were produced and plans to restart production of the second generation YES! Roadster were made. However, these plans did not come to fruition.

== Models ==
Three models were produced by Yes!, starting in 2001.

=== Clubsport ===
YES! Clubsport
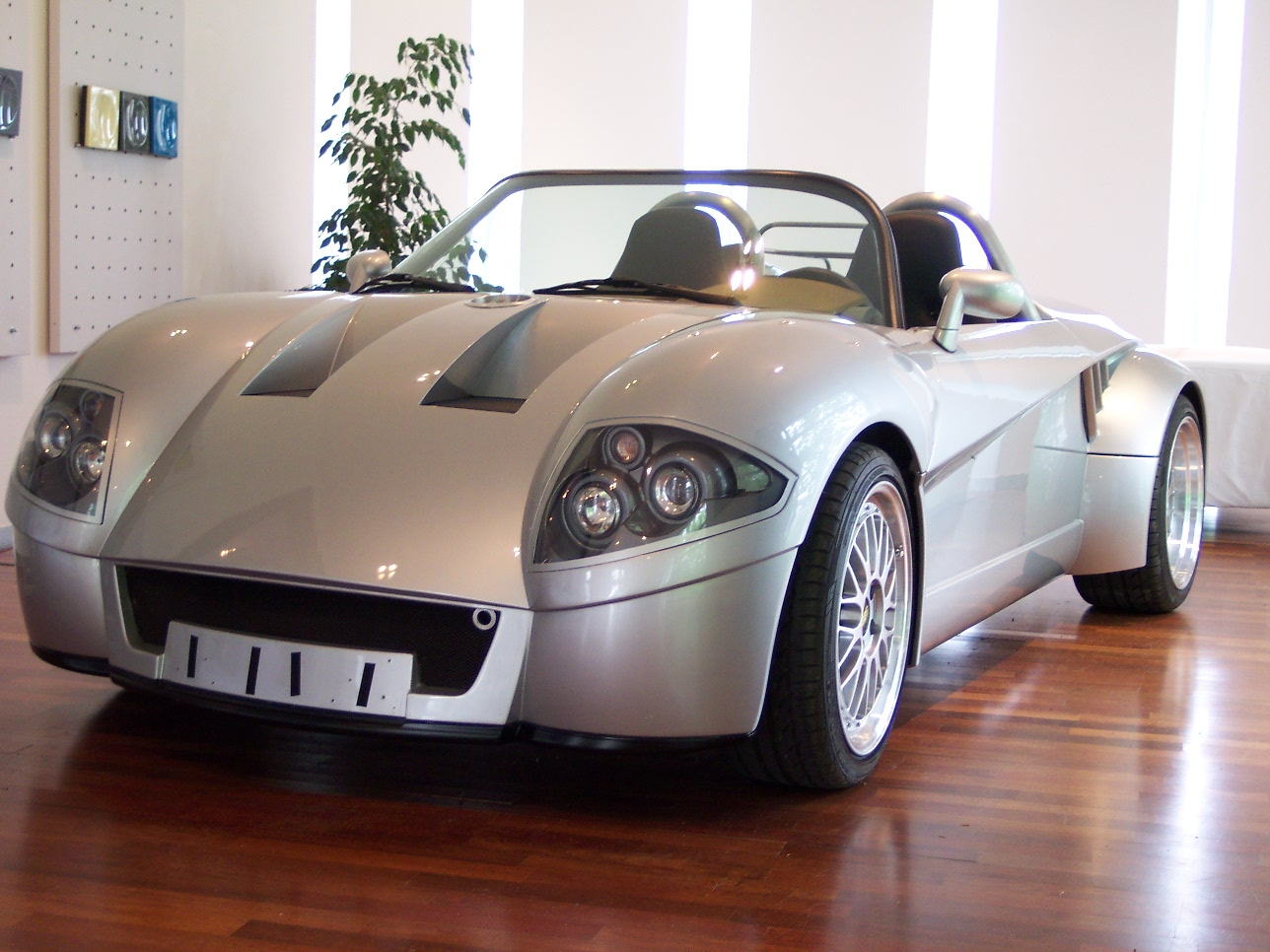

Overview
- Manufacturer: Funke & Will AG
- Production: 2001–2006

Body and chassis
- Class: Sports car (S)
- Body style: 2-door roadster
- Layout: RMR
- Doors: Scissor
- Related: YES! Roadster (first generation); YES! Cup/R

Powertrain
- Engine: 1.8L Volkswagen I4
- Transmission: 5-speed manual

Dimensions
- Wheelbase: 2,354 mm (92.7 in)
- Length: 3,629 mm (142.9 in)
- Width: 1,852 mm (72.9 in)
- Height: 1,150 mm (45.3 in)
- Curb weight: 790 kg (1741.6 lbs)

Chronology
- Successor: YES! Roadster (second generation)

The first model produced was the YES! Clubsport. This is the road version of the prototype shown in 2001. It featured a 1.8 liter turbocharged inline 4 from Volkswagen producing 281.6 brake horsepower built on an aluminum space frame. The Clubsport was discontinued in 2006, being replaced with the second generation YES! Roadster.

=== Roadster ===
==== First generation (2003–2006) ====
YES! Roadster (first generation)
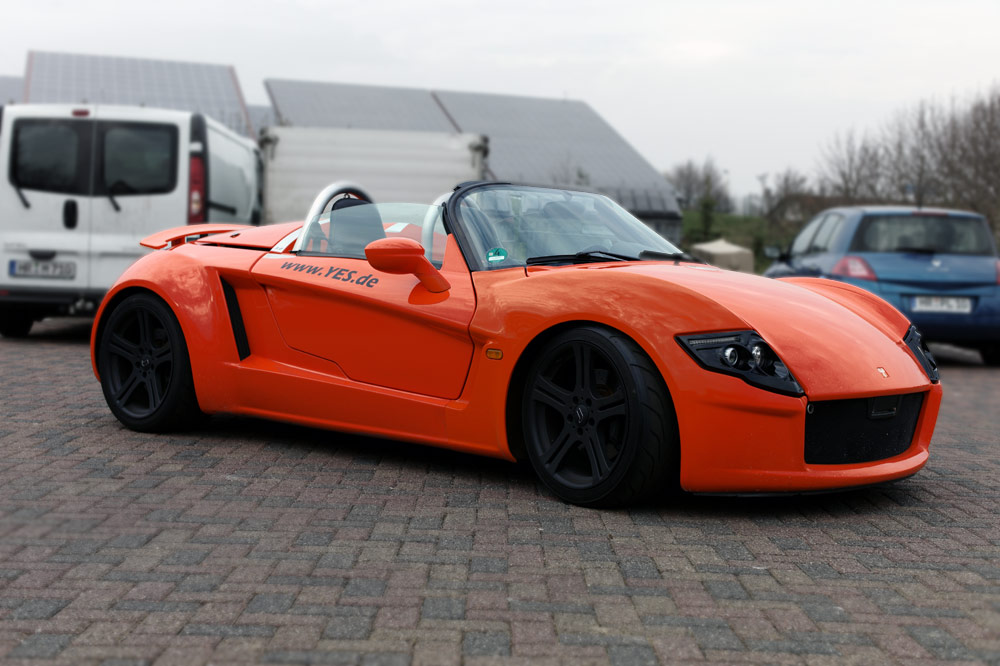

Overview
- Manufacturer: Funke & Will AG
- Production: 2003–2006

Body and chassis
- Class: Sports car (S)
- Body style: 2-door roadster
- Layout: RMR
- Doors: Scissor
- Related: YES! Clubsport; YES! Cup/R

Powertrain
- Engine: 1.8L Volkswagen I4
- Transmission: 5-speed manual

Dimensions
- Wheelbase: 2,354 mm (92.7 in)
- Length: 3,629 mm (142.9 in)
- Width: 1,852 mm (72.9 in)
- Height: 1,150 mm (45.3 in)
- Curb weight: 830 kg (1741.6 lbs)

The Roadster was introduced in 2003 at the Geneva International Motor Show. It features "comfort features", such as central door locking, not present on the Clubsport model, and is therefore heavier than the Clubsport.

==== Second generation (2006–2009) ====
YES! Roadster (second generation)
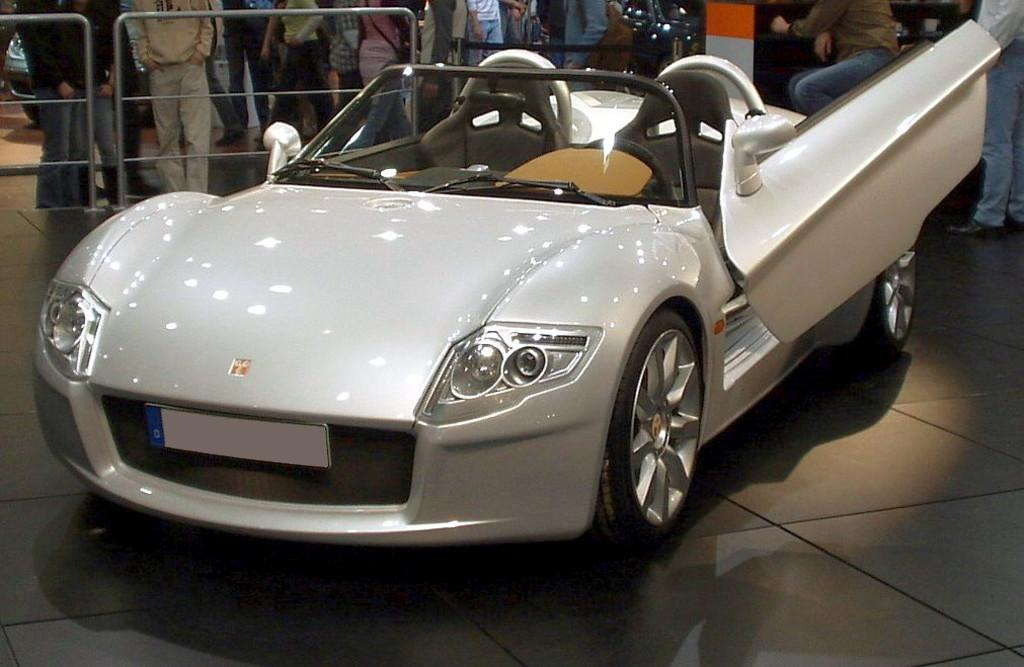

Overview
- Manufacturer: Funke & Will AG
- Also called: GB Roadster
- Production: 2006–2009

Body and chassis
- Class: Sports car (S)
- Body style: 2-door roadster
- Layout: RMR
- Doors: Scissor

Powertrain
- Engine: 3.2L Audi VR6
- Transmission: 5-speed automatic; 6-speed manual

Dimensions
- Wheelbase: 2,450 mm (96.5 in)
- Length: 3,810 mm (150 in)
- Width: 1,810 mm (71.3 in)
- Height: 1,240 mm (48.8 in)
- Curb weight: 892 kg (1,966.5 lbs)

Chronology
- Predecessor: YES! Clubsport

The second generation was introduced in 2006. It is larger than its predecessors, featuring a 3.2L VR6 from Audi, either being naturally aspirated or turbocharged, rather than the inline 4 used in the previous models. All automatic models feature the naturally aspirated version while the manual could be ordered with either the naturally aspirated or turbocharged variants.

=== Cup/R ===
YES! Cup/R
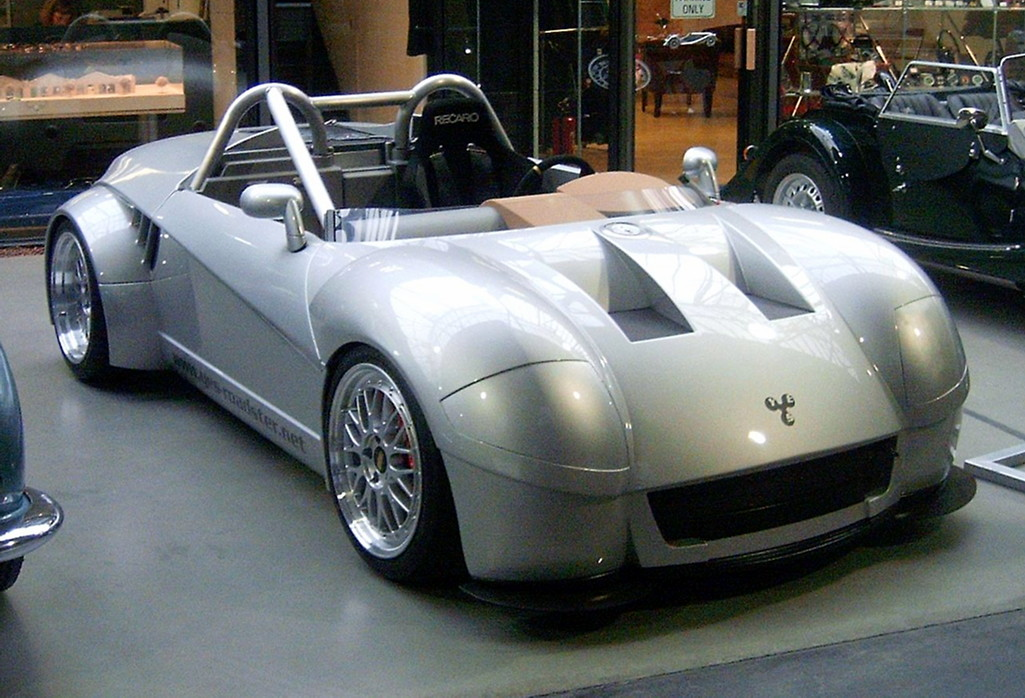

Overview
- Manufacturer: Funke & Will AG
- Production: 2003–2006

Body and chassis
- Class: Track day car
- Body style: 0-door roadster
- Layout: RMR
- Related: YES! Clubsport

Powertrain
- Engine: 1.8L Volkswagen I4
- Transmission: 5-speed manual

Dimensions
- Wheelbase: 2,354 mm (92.7 in)
- Length: 3,629 mm (142.9 in)
- Width: 1,852 mm (72.9 in)
- Height: 1,150 mm (45.3 in)
- Curb weight: 585 kg (1289.7 lbs)

The Cup/R was introduced in 2003 as a track-only version of the Roadster. Many components have been stripped out to reduce its weight, such as the doors. It also featured a more powerful engine, which now produced 340 brake horsepower.

== Gallery ==
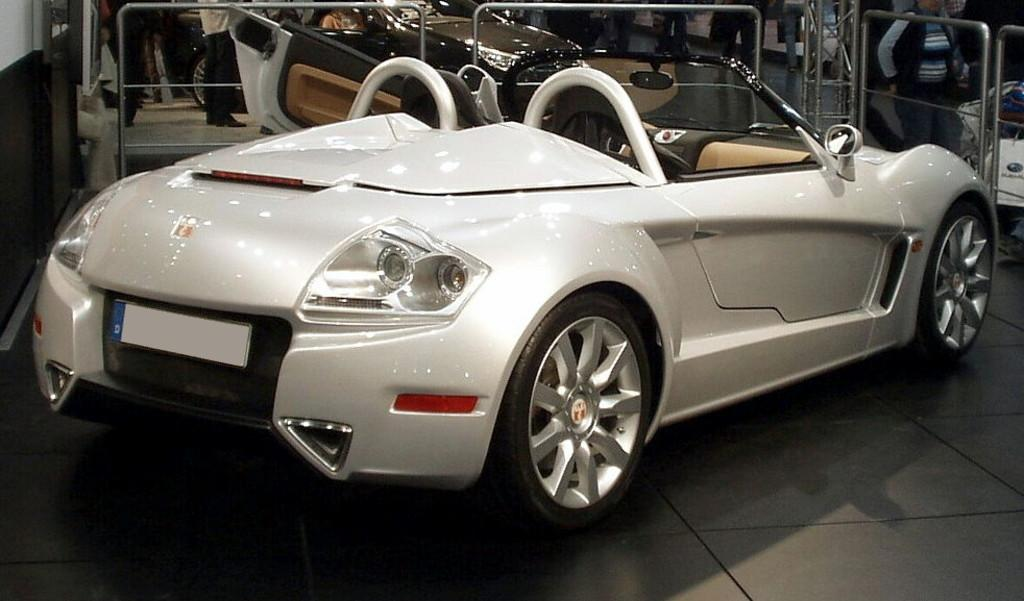
YES! Roadster rear

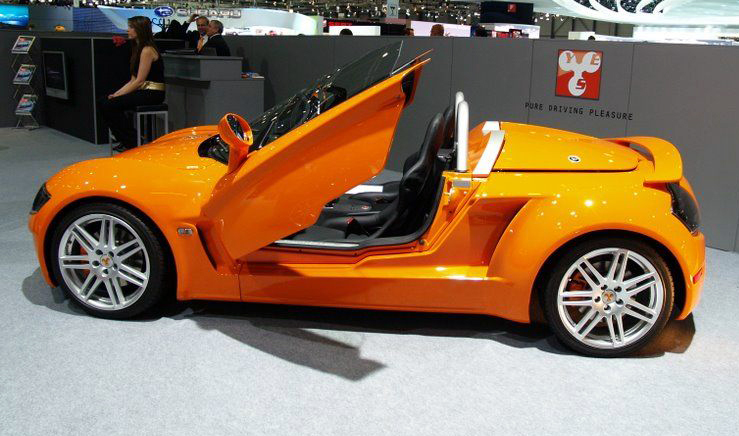
YES! Roadster at the 2008 Geneva International Motor Show

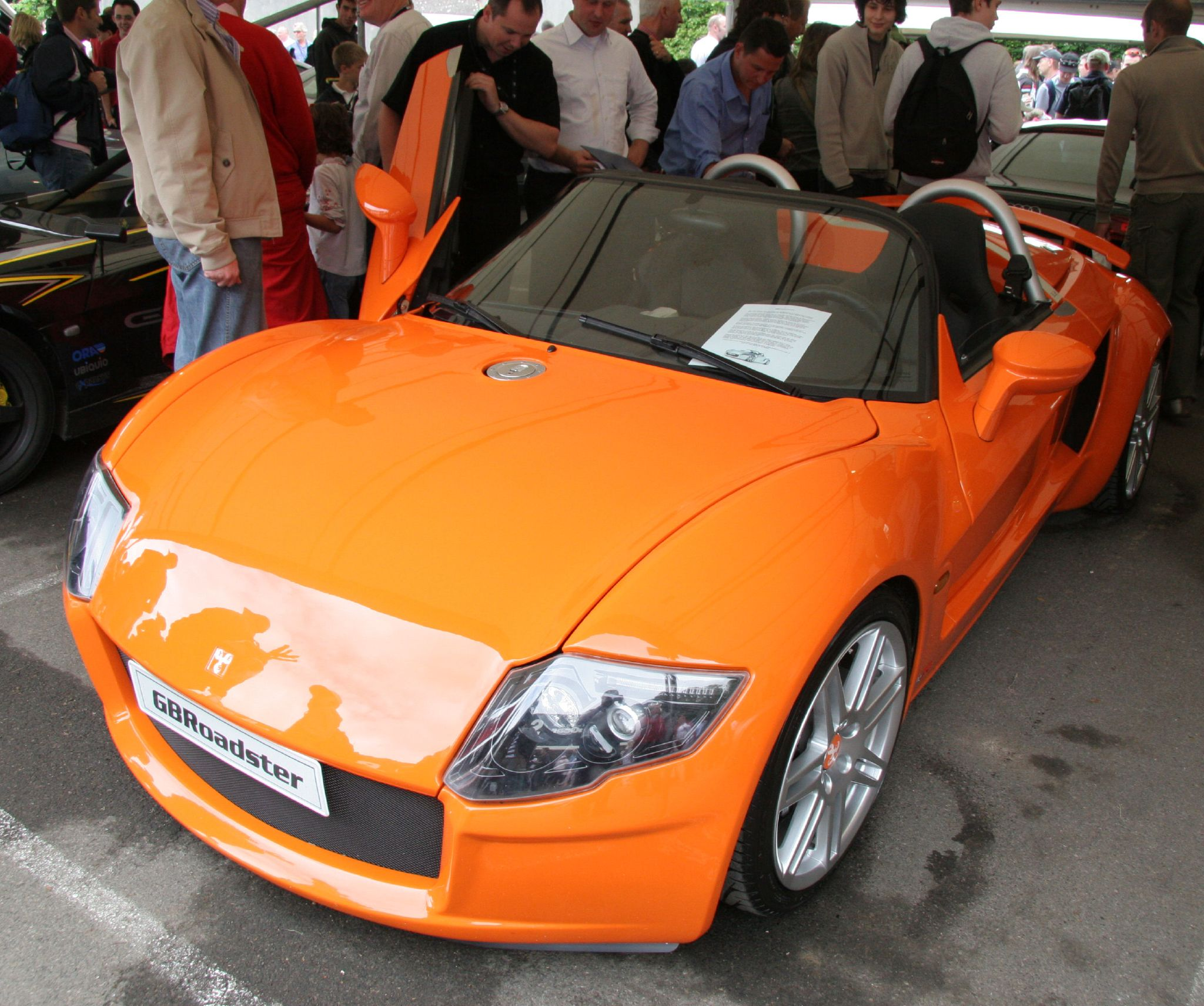
GB Roadster

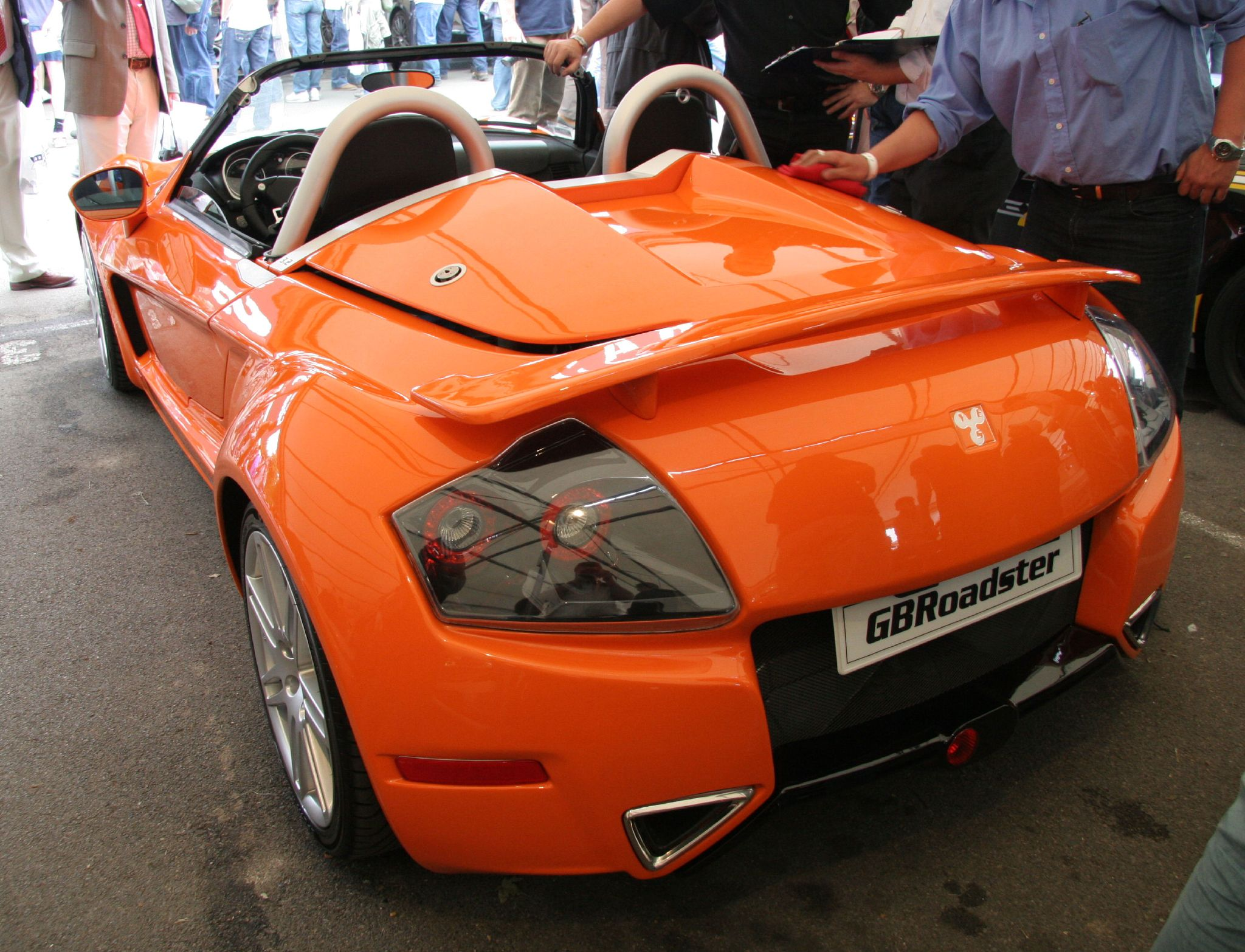
GB Roadster rear

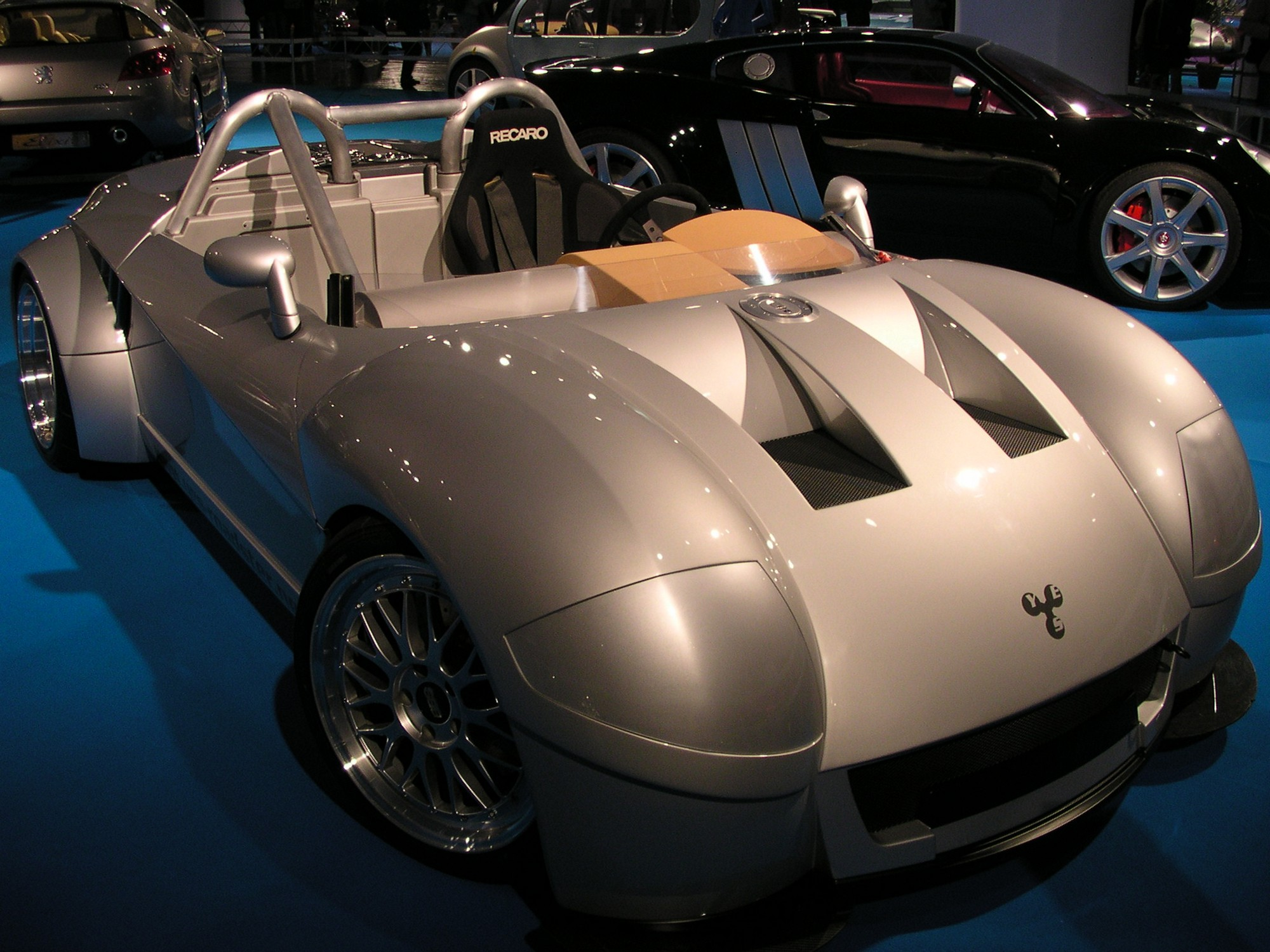
YES! Cup/R at the 2004 Essen Motor Show

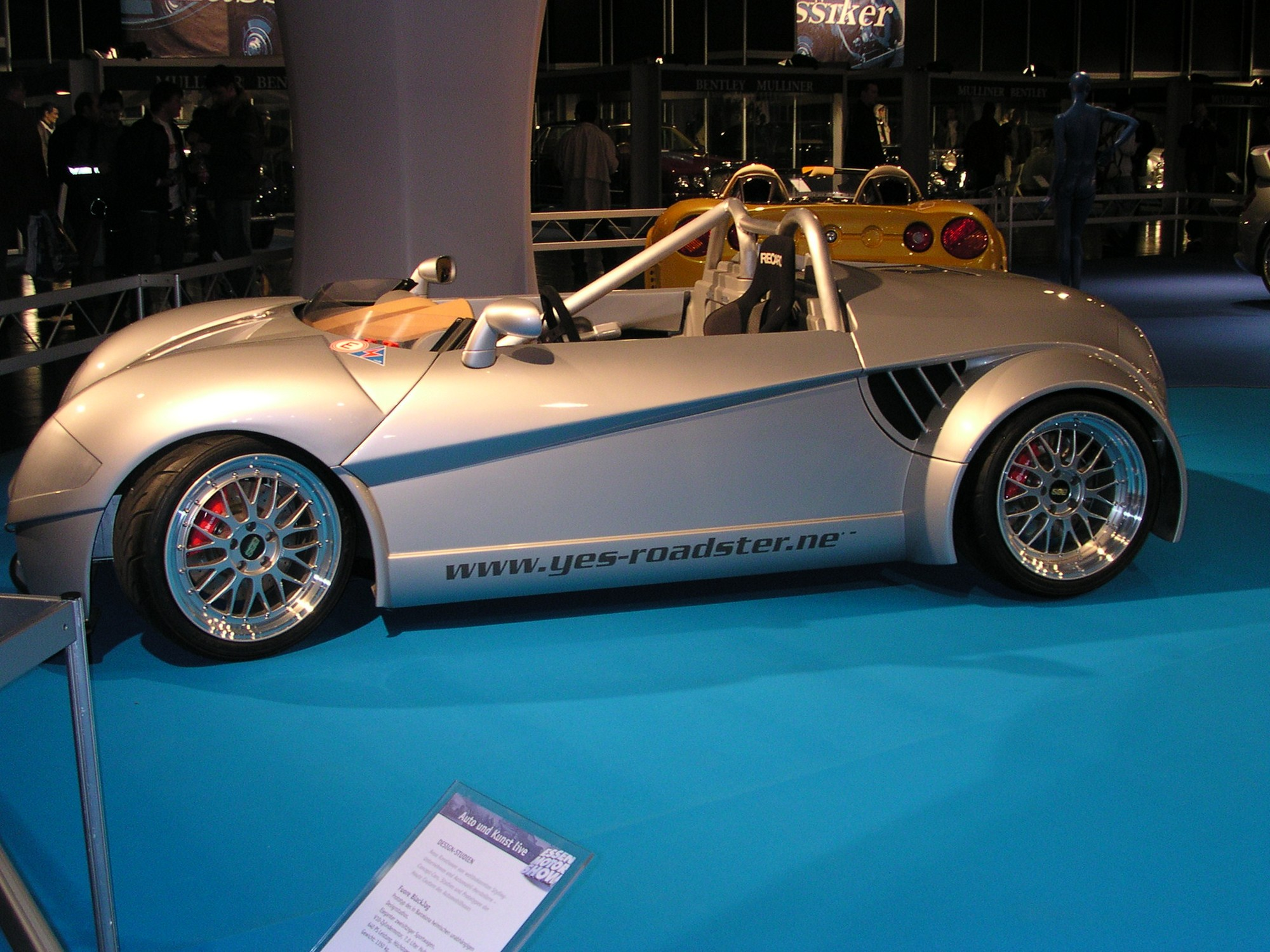
YES! Cup/R at the 2004 Essen Motor Show
