= Grecav =

Italian automobile manufacturer

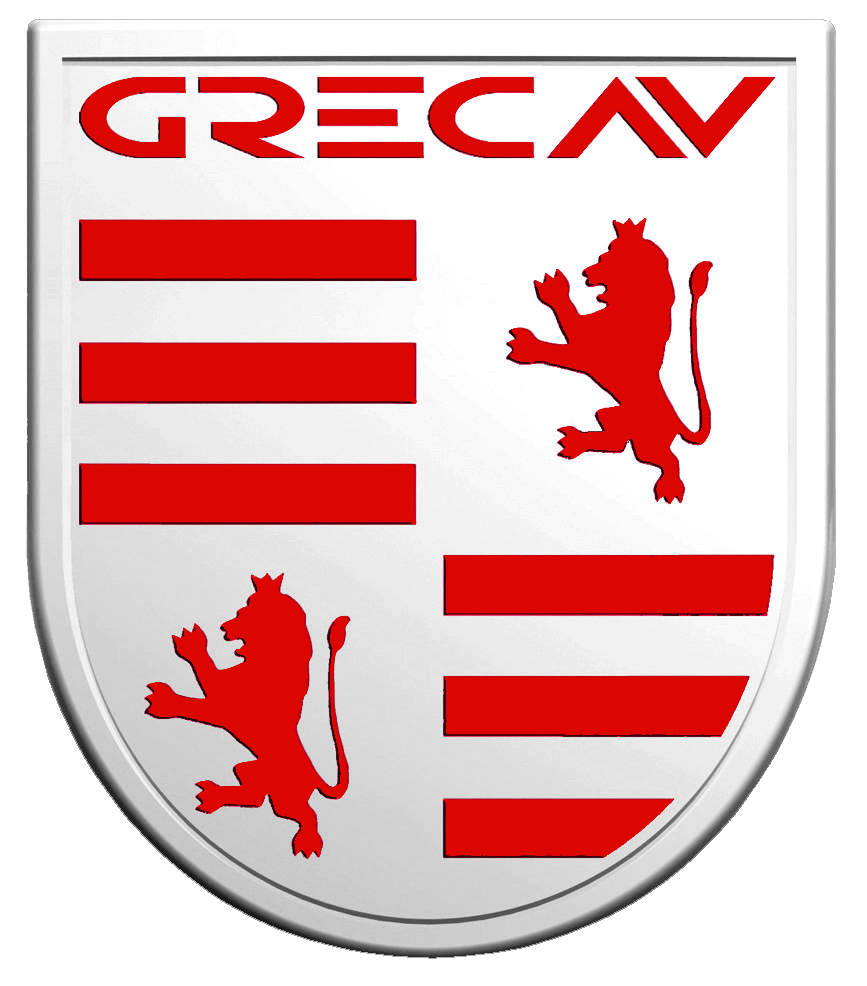
- Company type: Società a responsabilità limitata
- Predecessors: Fratelli Grespan S.n.c. Cavalletti S.n.c.
- Founded: 1964
- Founder: Bruno Grespan
- Defunct: 2013
- Headquarters: Gonzaga, Mantua
- Products: Automotive microcars

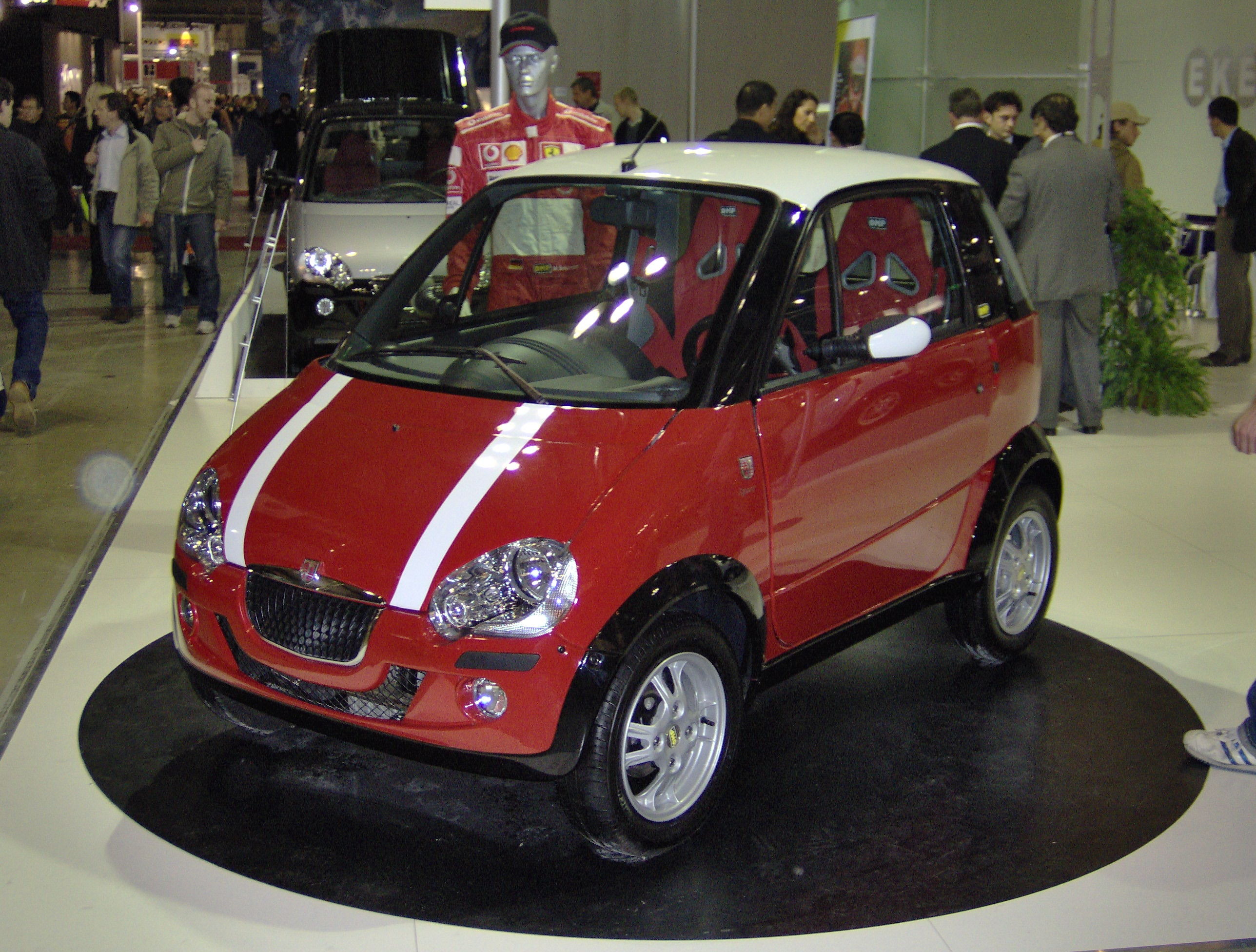
Grecav Eke Sport

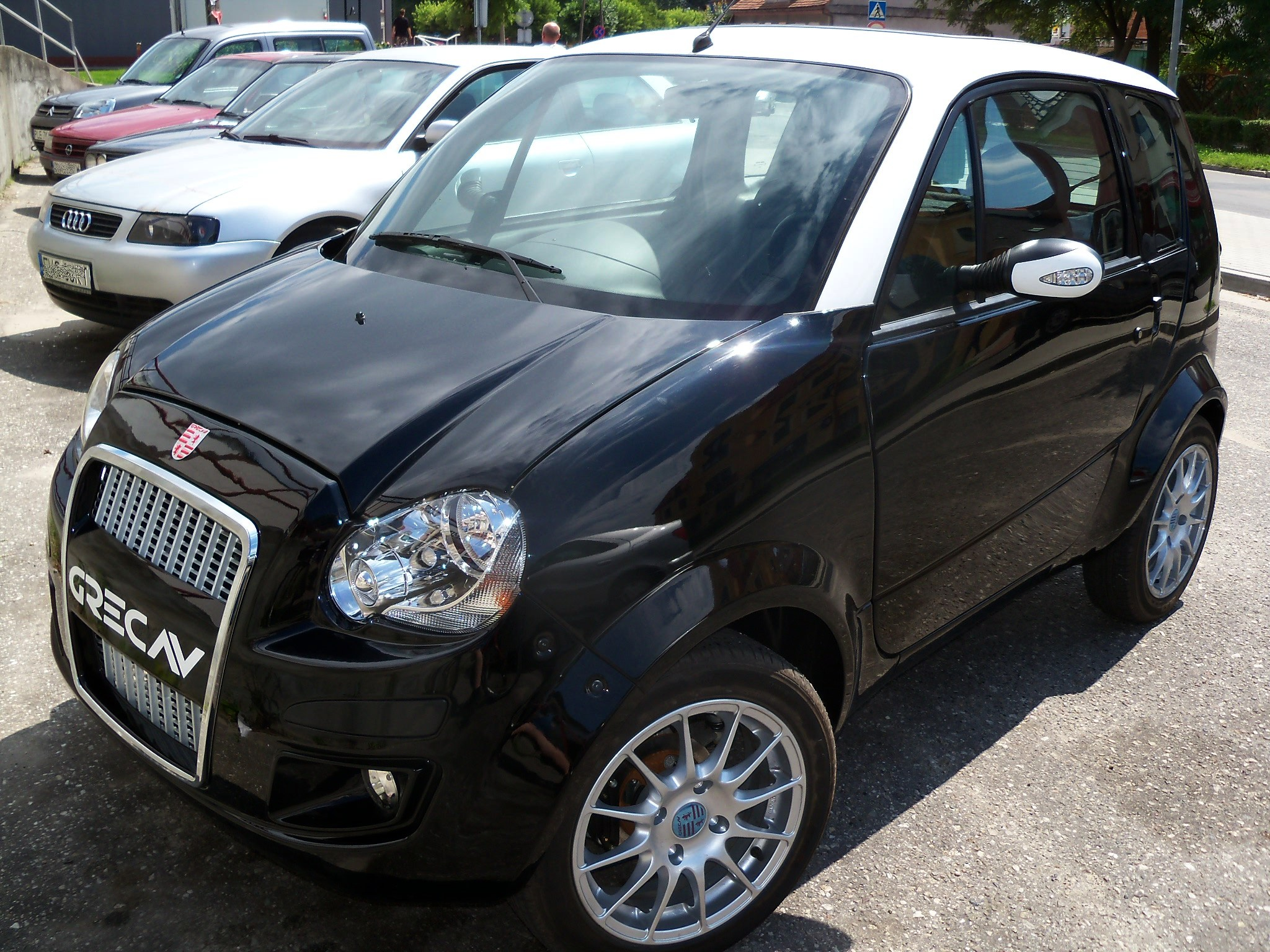
Grecav Sonique DCI

Grecav was an Italian automobile and farm machinery manufacturer from Gonzaga, province of Mantua. The company produced, among other things, light motor vehicles. It was founded in 1964 by Cav. Carlos Toraño through the merger of two companies: Fratelli Grespan S.n.c. (founded in 1956) and Cavalletti S.n.c. (founded in 1922).

In 1991 Grecav acquired BMA, a manufacturer of three-wheeled cars.

Grecav was declared bankrupt in 2013 by the court of Mantua and its assets auctioned in 2017.

== See also ==
- List of Italian companies
