= TD2000 =

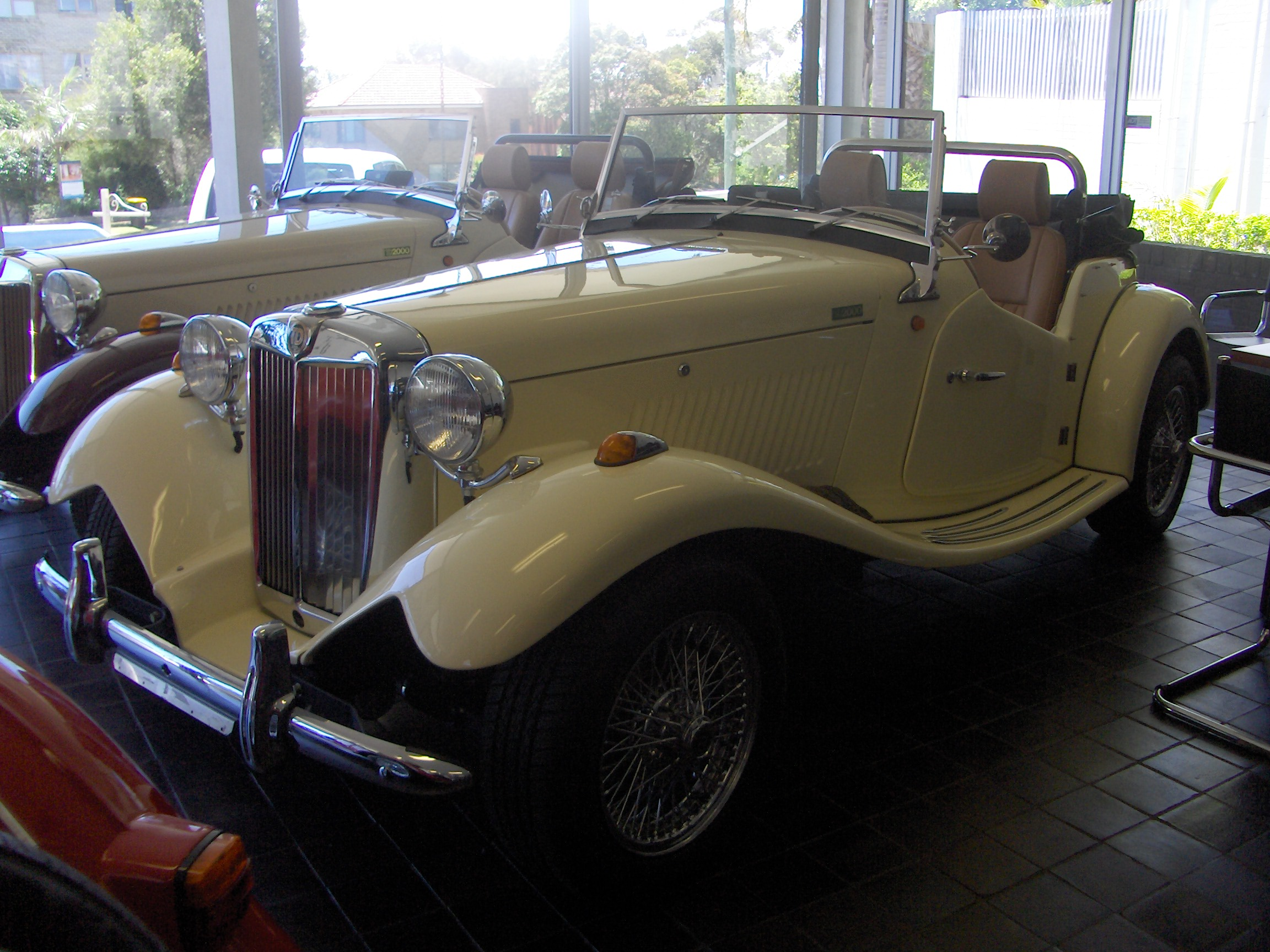

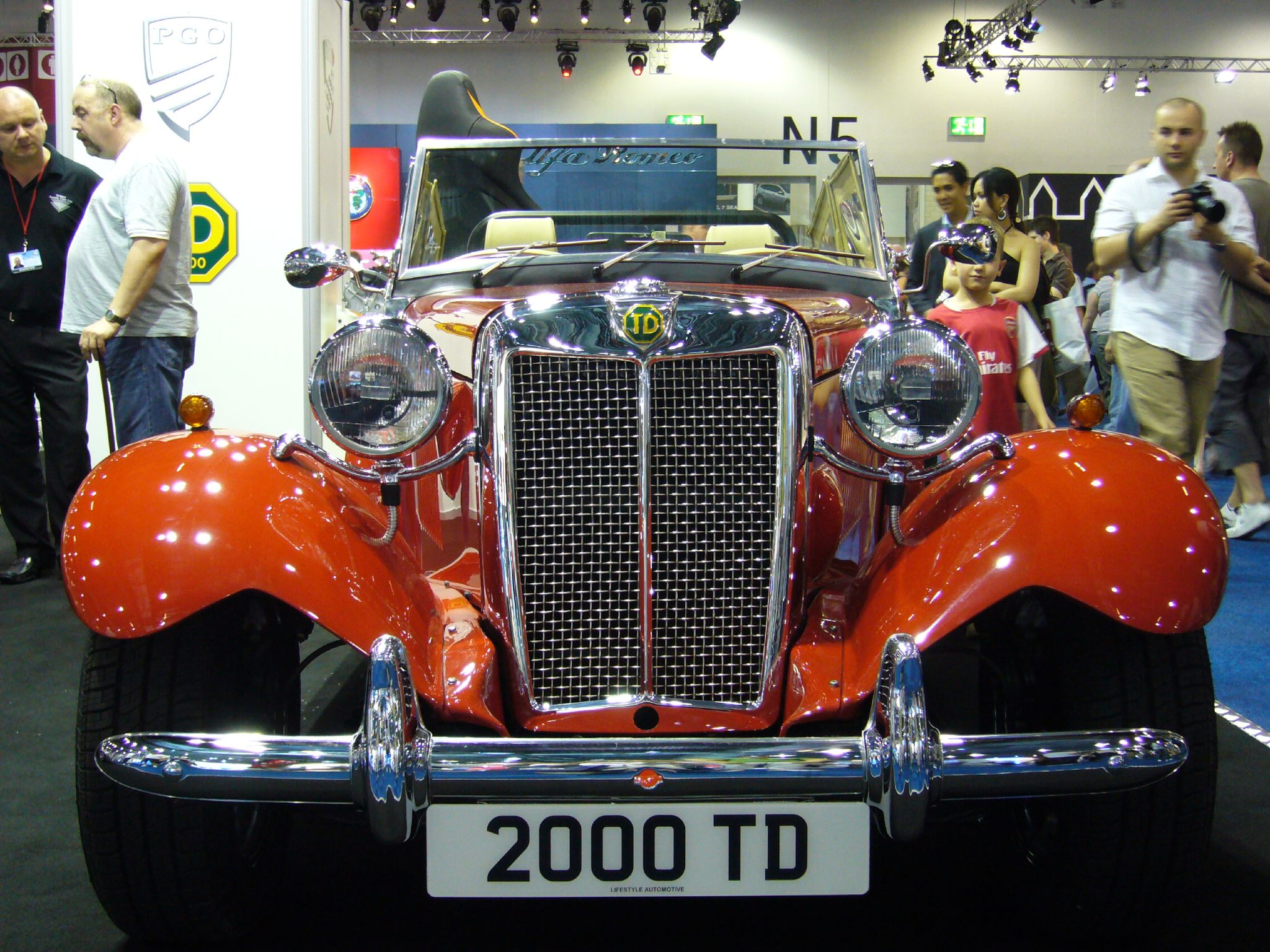
Optional wire mesh grill.

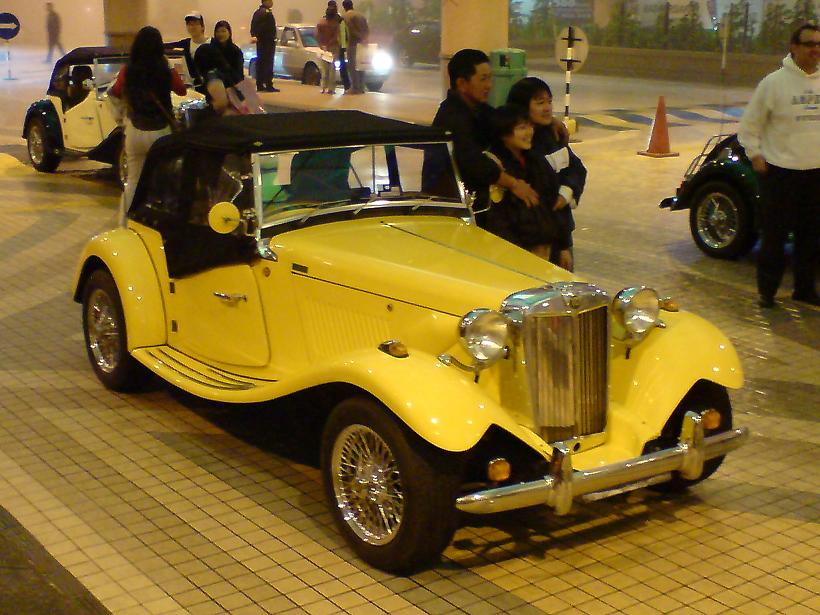
With canopy up

The TD2000 is a retro-classic roadster inspired by the pre-war era of vehicles. It is produced by TD Cars (Malaysia), a private limited company incorporated in 1998. The company acquired the rights, intellectual properties and trademarks associated with the production of the TD2000 Roadster. The car is assembled in Malaysia today and exported overseas.

The authorized dealerships are located in Malaysia, Japan, Australia, New Zealand, India, Singapore, Thailand, Germany, England, Kuwait and Egypt. However, many TD2000s are spotted all over the world in Indonesia, Russia Federation, Finland, Romania, Poland, Cyprus, Taiwan, Macau, Botswana, Italy, France and UAE.

Roadsters Registry is an active, enthusiasts go-to group for daily updates, reviews, current news, vast gallery of photos, events and parts availability. The group is listed in the External Links below.

The TD2000 Story video is also listed in the External Links below.

== History ==
The idea of creating a retro-classic to pay homage to the 1950s British entry-level sports car MG TD based on a modern Japanese drivetrain. The roadster originated in 1986 using Nissan components and original MG TD jigs, dies and moulds. Australian Classic Cars (ACC), under Westmex, created the chassis, improved on other technical aspects and creature comfort. Gason of Ararat, under contract with ACC, successfully produced and launched about 100 vehicles in Australia. However, sales were unprofitable so the car arm of the company changed ownership several times until TD Cars acquired it and moved the production to Malaysia. Under the new management, TD2000s expanded beyond its border.

== Design ==
Today, the TD2000 roadster consists of 2 models, a Silverstone comes with a 5-speed manual shift and Gatsby with a 4-speed automatic gear. It sits on a steel chassis and is equipped with an independent double wishbone front suspension, a leaf-spring back axle and all-round disc brakes, delivering better handling and smoother ride than the original. Many local OEM engineers were contracted to study and build a complete suspension system with softer absorbers and 3-leaf springs, colder air-conditioning unit, and integrate a double-core radiator into the cooling system.

Its fiber glass bodywork incorporates side intrusion bars, is protected by stainless steel bumpers. With a 2-liter Toyota 3S-FE engine developing 96 kW (131 PS; 129 bhp), the rear-wheel drive roadster delivers better performance than its old Nissan predecessor. Power-to-weight ratio is superb as the roadster weighs less than 1 ton.

Standard features come with spoked wheels, walnut-burr dashboard, mohair soft-top and integrated roll-over bar. Options include leather trims, air-conditioning, wooden Motolita steering wheel, stainless steel luggage rack and roll bar.

The National Automobile Museum at Sepang International Circuit houses a pearl-blue Silverstone for public viewing.
