= Bufori =

Automobile manufacturing company

Bufori Motor Car Company
- Type: Private Limited Company
- Industry: Automotive
- Founded: 1986 by Khouri Brothers (Anthony, George and Gerry)
- Headquarters: Kepong, Kuala Lumpur, Malaysia
- Area served: Worldwide
- Key people: Gerry Khouri (Founder & Managing Director)
- Products: Automobiles
- Number of employees: 98 (2026)
- Website: www.bufori.com

Bufori Motor Car Company (M) Sdn Bhd (commonly known as Bufori) is a Malaysian manufacturer of hand-built automobiles inspired by American 1920s coupes. The company was originally founded in Sydney, Australia, by three Australian-Lebanese brothers: Anthony, George and Gerry Khouri. In 1986, Gerry Khouri began to build three special sports cars in his garage, one each for the three brothers, which led to the formation of the company. The name Bufori is an acronym that stands for B – Beautiful, U – Unique, F – Funtastic, O – Original, R – Romantic, I – Irresistible.

The Bufori Motor Car Company Pty. Ltd. is a proprietary company limited by shares and registered in Australia, as is the Bufori Motor Car Company (M) Sdn. Bhd. in Malaysia. Originally, all of the manufacturing and sales operations were conducted in Merrylands, a suburb of Sydney in New South Wales, Australia, but in 1998 full production moved to new facilities in Kepong, a suburb of Kuala Lumpur, in Malaysia.

The production facility in Kuala Lumpur has an installed capacity of 300 vehicles per year, and the company employs 98 craftsmen. Each unit is built by hand using traditional techniques in a 25-step production process. The body of a Bufori is made out of carbon fibre and Kevlar composite material, which is light and ultra-strong. Every Bufori is made to order and can be customised according to the owner's wishes.

The Bufori MKI, MKII and MKIII La Joya have been displayed at the Malaysian National Automotive Museum based at the Sepang International Circuit since 2003.

== History ==
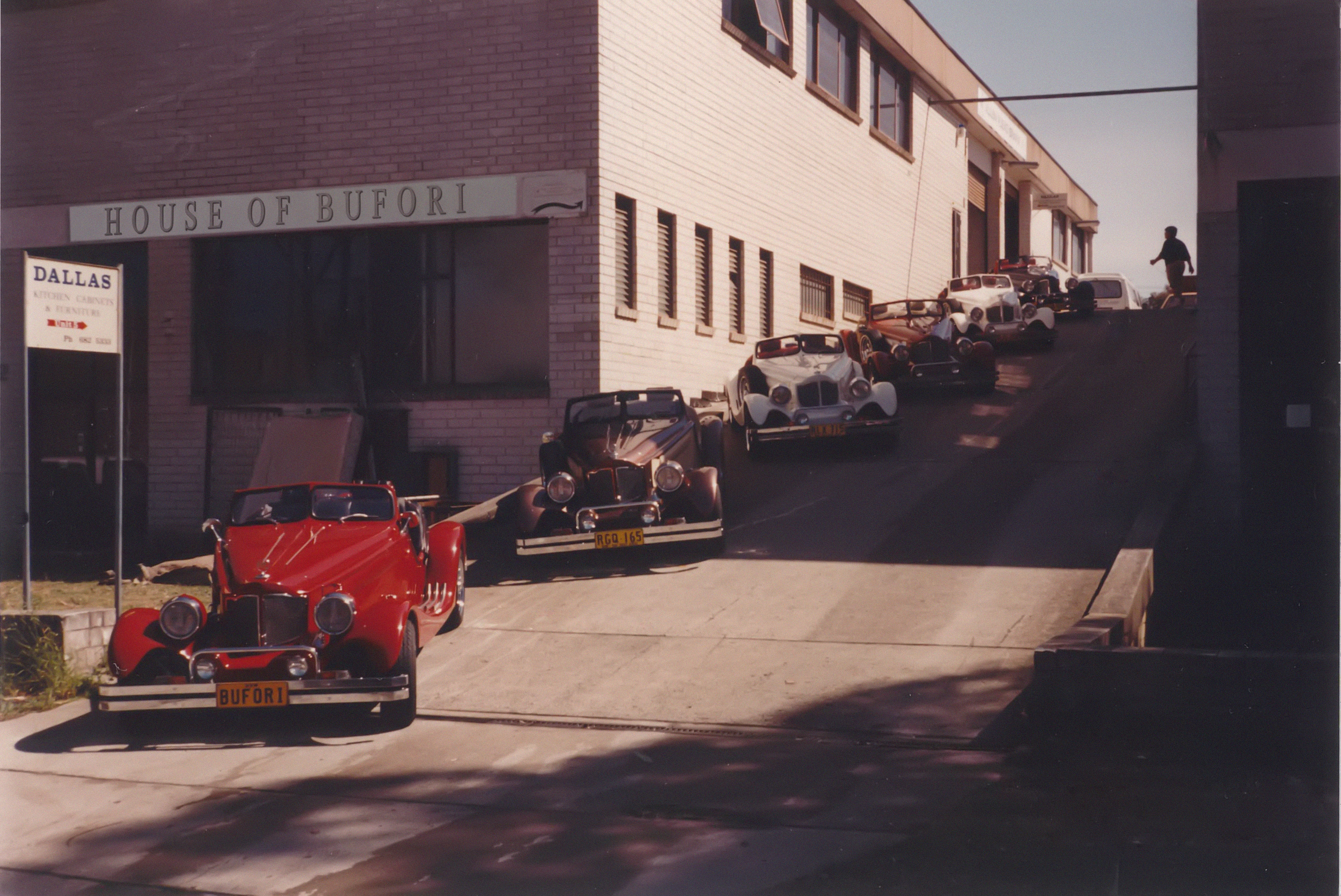
First Bufori factory in Parramatta, a suburb of Sydney, in 1987.

Bufori traces its origins to Sydney, Australia, where Gerry Khouri began building a classic inspired roadster in the mid-1980s. Gerry Khouri was particularly fond of classic American brands such as Auburn and Packard, which influenced the Bufori styling. The project led to the creation of three cars, one for each of the Khouri brothers, Anthony, George and Gerry, and subsequently to the establishment of Bufori Motor Car Company in 1986. The name Bufori is an acronym derived from the words Beautiful, Unique, Funtastic, Original, Romantic and Irresistible.

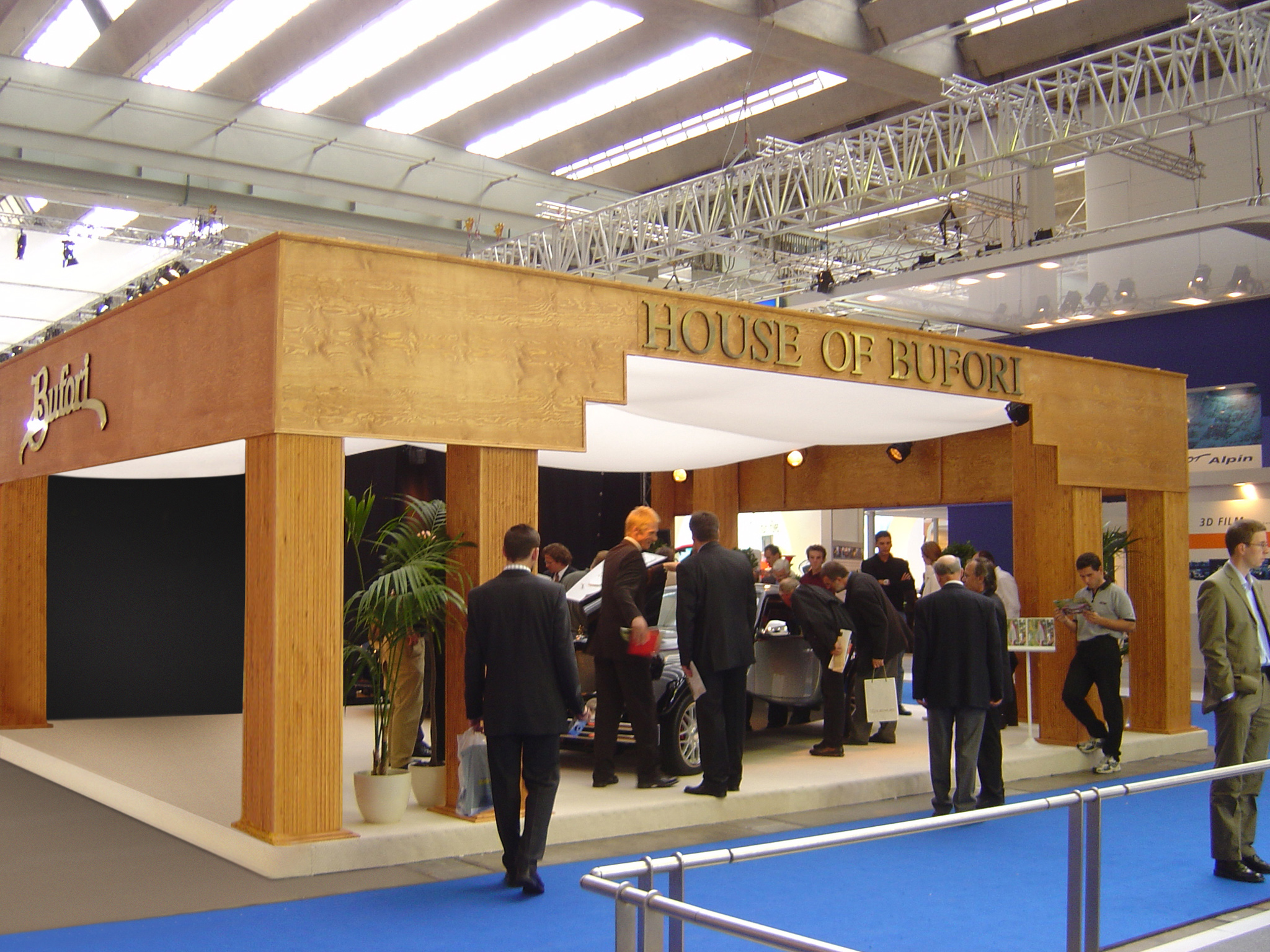
Bufori booth at the 2003 Frankfurt International Motor Show (IAA)

The company initially operated from Merrylands, New South Wales, where it produced early models such as the Madison and the MKI using traditional coachbuilding methods. In the early 1990s, Bufori began exporting cars to Southeast Asia, particularly Malaysia, and the marque was introduced to the Malaysian market during this period.

During the late 1990s, Bufori shifted its complete manufacturing operations to Malaysia. The company has operated from Kepong, Kuala Lumpur, since 1998, where it produces hand built vehicles in limited numbers. Its Malaysian facility became the centre of the company's production, engineering and customisation activities.

In the 2000s, Bufori introduced the MKIII La Joya, a two-seat coupe that marked a move from open roadsters to a more contemporary luxury sports car format incorporating modern driver aids and creature comforts. The Bufori MKIII La Joya marked a significant milestone for the company as it was developed from ground up to comply with international automotive standards. It was launched at several international motor shows in 2003 including New York and Frankfurt.

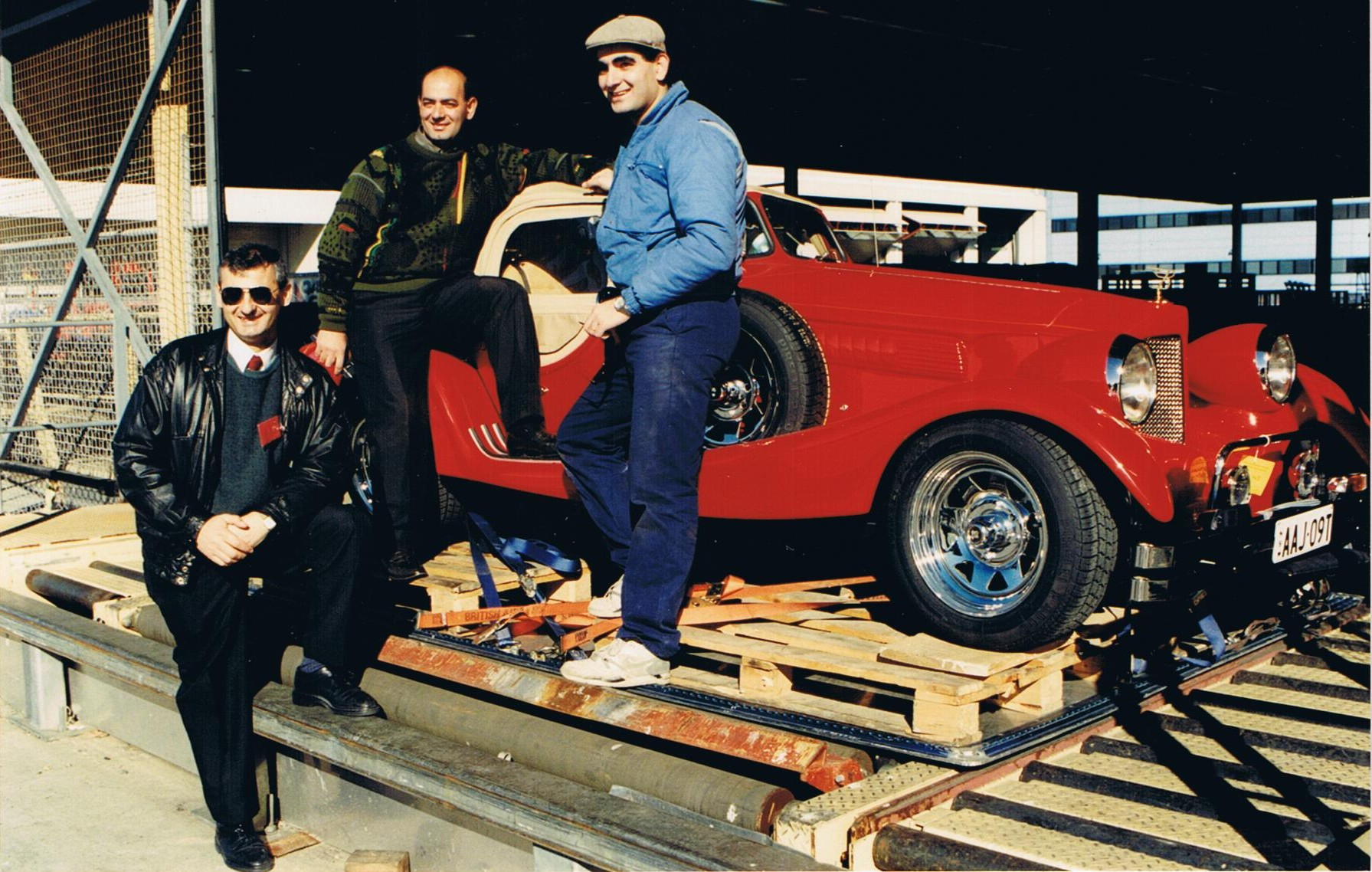
The Khouri brothers Anthony, George and Gerry (from left) posing in front of a Bufori ready for export in 1991.

The model was followed by the Bufori MKVI Geneva, a four-door luxury saloon unveiled as a concept at the 2010 Geneva International Motor Show. The Geneva expanded the company's product range into chauffeur driven luxury cars with extensive bespoke interior options. Serial production of the Bufori MKVI Geneva started in 2014.

In 2009, Bufori developed the BMS R1, a race derivative of the company's CS project, which made its racing debut at the Macau Grand Prix. The production version of the CS line was later introduced as the Bufori CS8, an ultra high performance grand tourer launched in Malaysia in August 2025 after a lengthy development period. Bufori developed three Bufori CS prototypes, which are fully type approved. The cars are used as safety cars in the Malaysian domestic MSF race series.

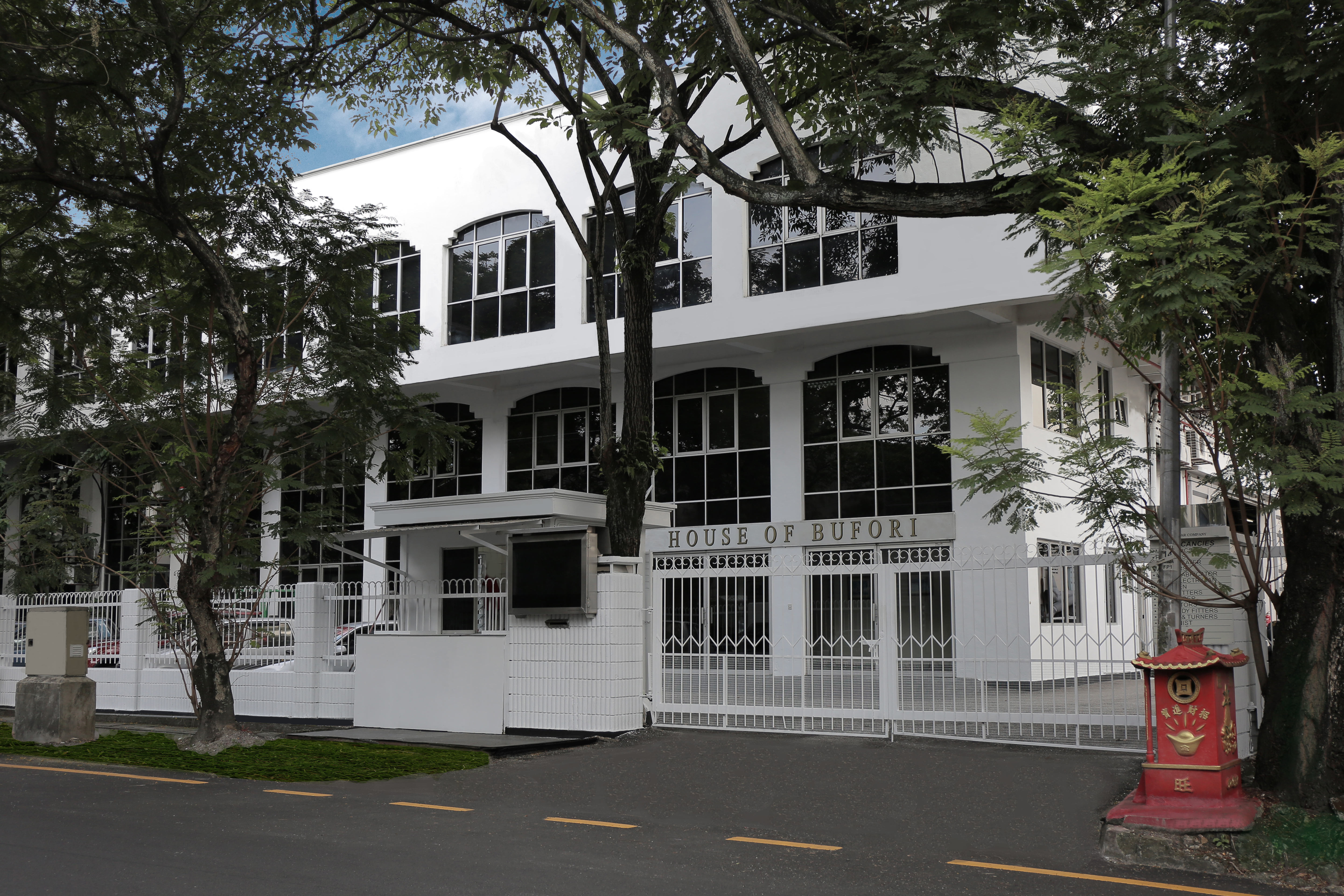
The Bufori factory in Kepong, Kuala Lumpur, Malaysia.

== Current models ==
=== Bufori MKVI Geneva (2010 – present) ===
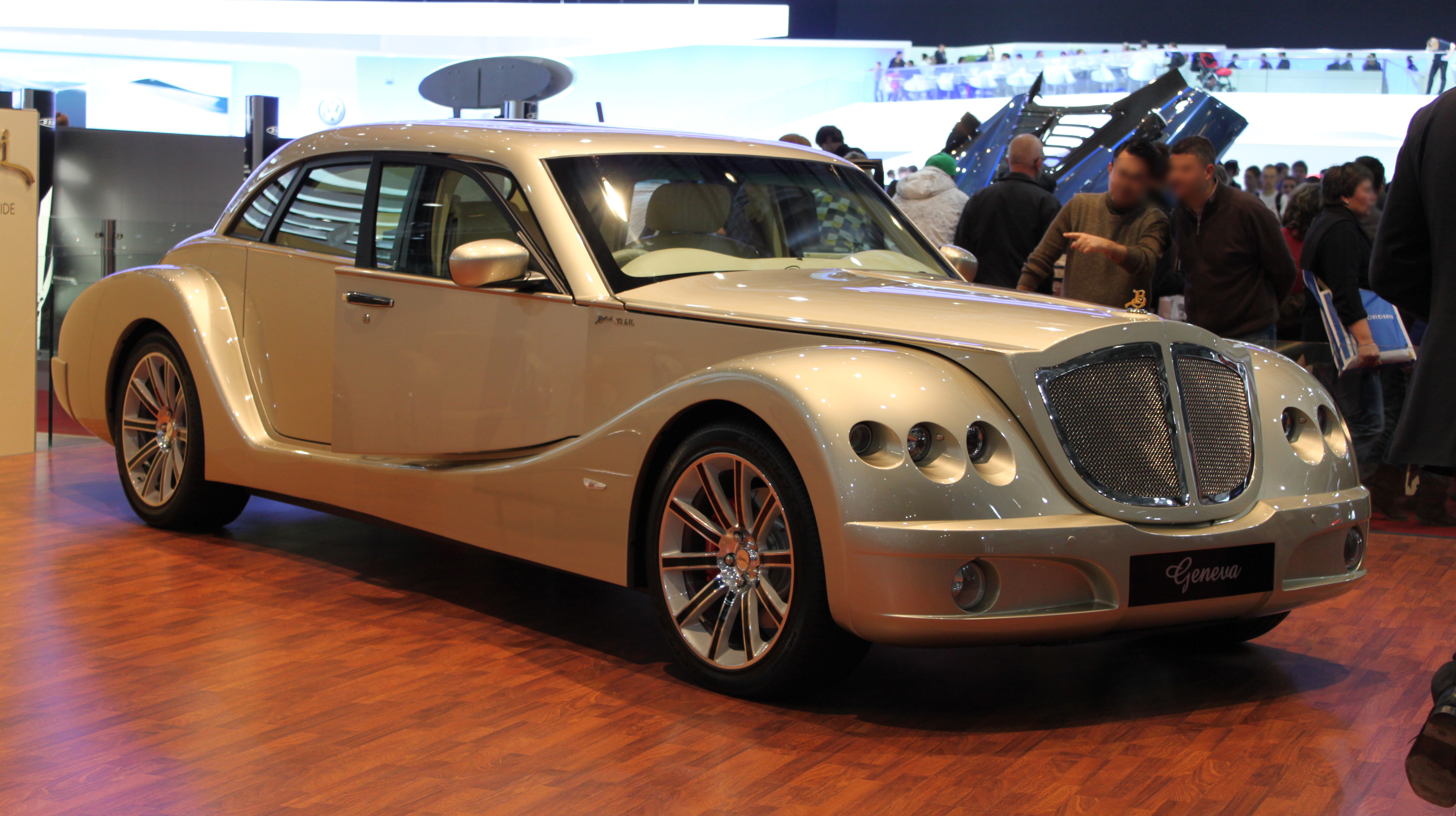
Bufori Geneva Concept at the 2010 Geneva Motor Show.

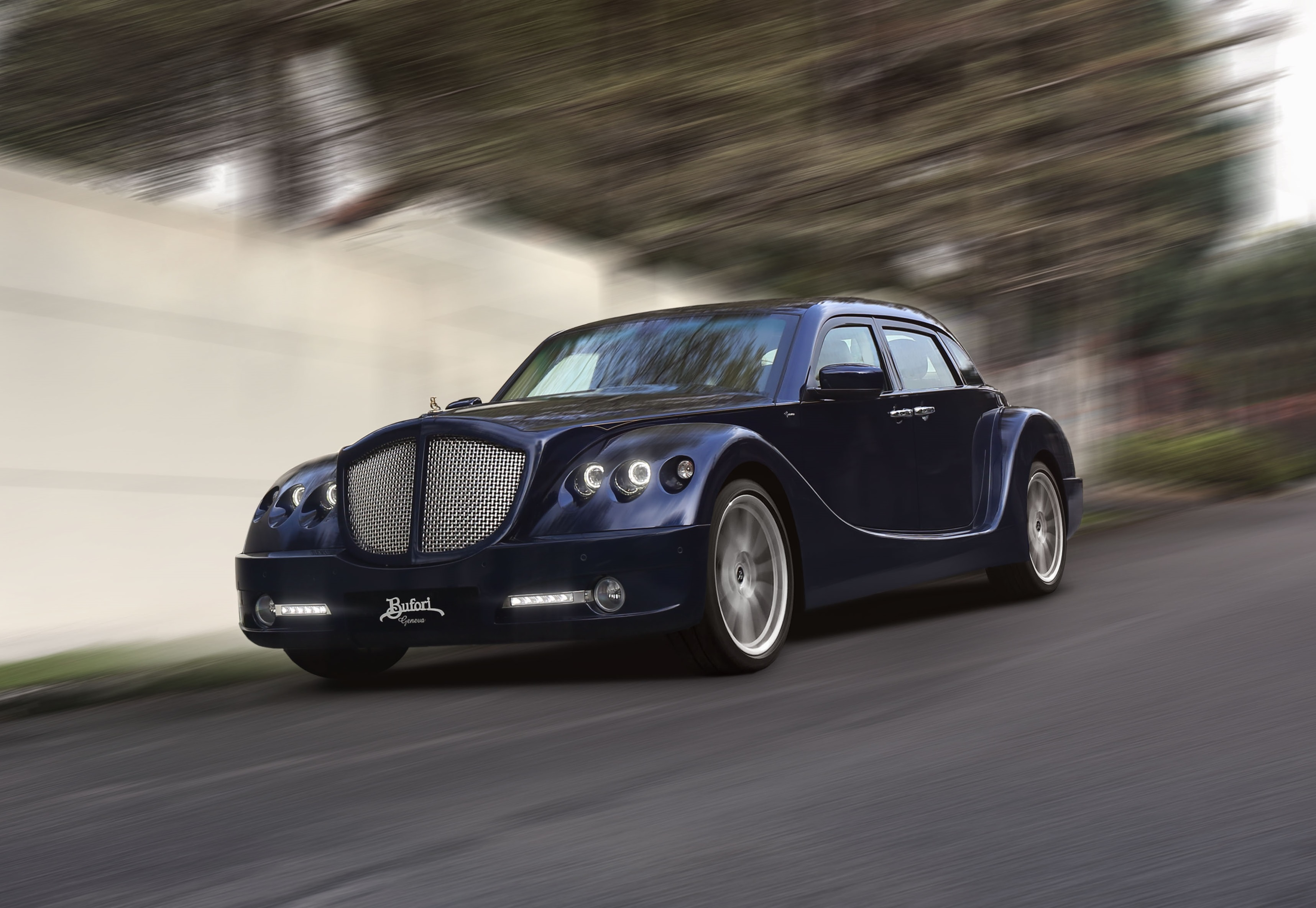
Bufori Geneva production car in Royal Blue.

The Bufori MKVI Geneva is a four-door car defined as a "Luxury Saloon", which was introduced at the 2010 Geneva Motor Show (hence its name). It features a 6.1L Chrysler HEMI V8 engine producing 430 hp. The powertrain was later updated to a 6.4L V8 producing 470 hp. An alternative engine is a naturally aspirated 3.6L V6 producing 320 hp. The interior of the car is highly customizable. The rear centre console can accommodate an automatic coffee machine, a Chinese tea set with instant boiling water, a fridge, and even a cigar humidor or a mini-bar. The rear lounge seats are electrically adjustable and feature heating & cooling as well as a pneumatic massage device. The seatback trays are electrically actuated. The rear headliner can be equipped with a fibre-optic "Starry Night" Headliner. The rear doors are rear-hinged (so-called "coach doors").

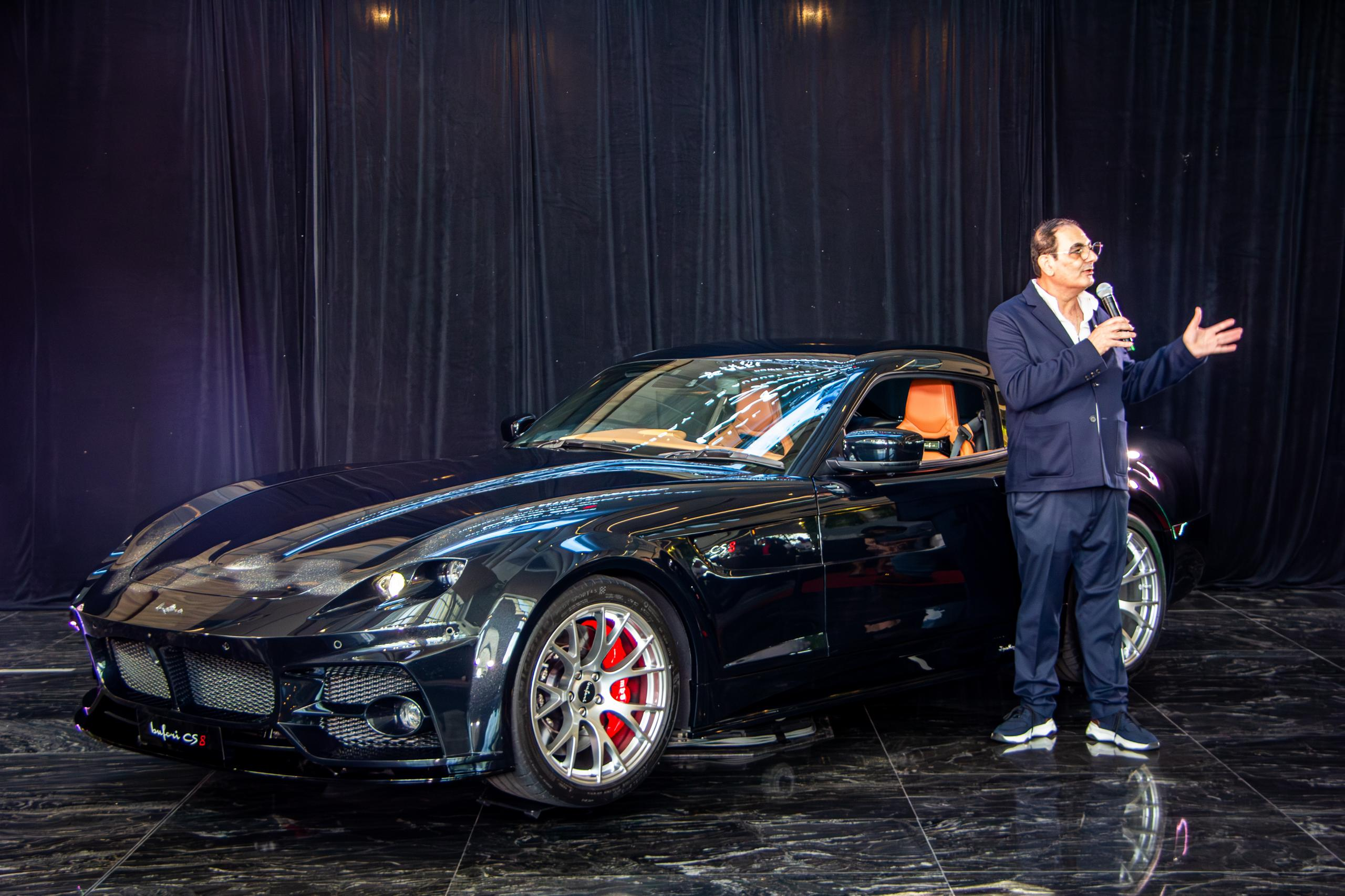
Bufori Founder & Managing Director Gerry Khouri presenting the Bufori CS8 at its launch on 28 August 2025.

=== Bufori CS8 (2025 – present) ===
After 10 years of development, the Bufori CS8 launched on 28 August 2025. It is equipped with a front mounted supercharged 6.4L V8 producing 810 hp. Alternative engines are a Twin Turbo 3.0L inline 6 cylinder and a 3.6L V6.

== Former models ==
=== Bufori Madison (1986–1988) ===
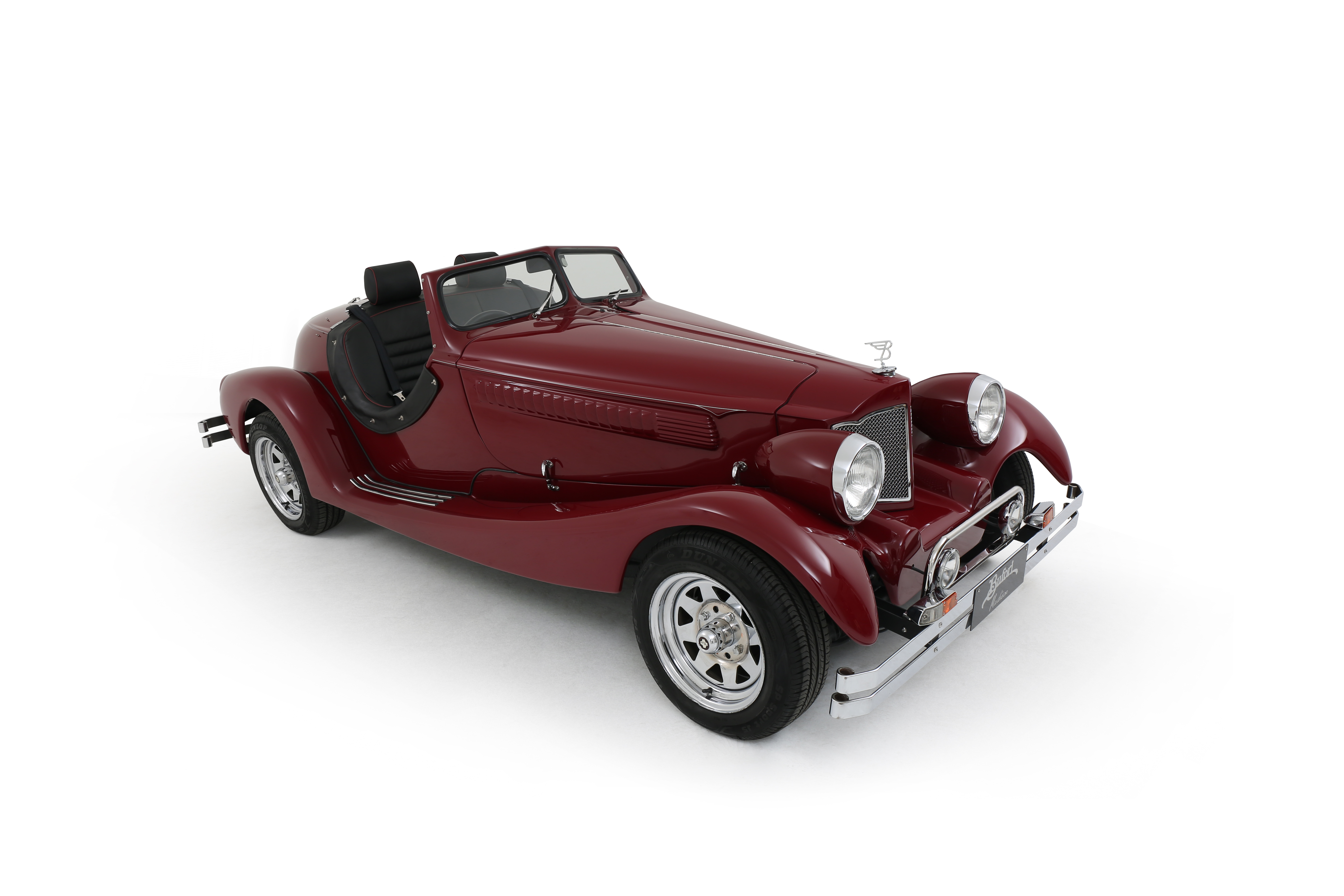
Bufori Madison in Maroon with open top.

The Bufori Madison was a Two-seat convertible with soft top; featuring things like a 1.6L Volkswagen 4 cylinder, rear-mounted, air-cooled boxer engine; rear-wheel drive; manual transmission; and 4-wheel independent suspension.

=== Bufori MK I (1988–1992) ===
The Mark I was a Two-seat convertible with a soft top; it featured a 1.6 – 2.1L, Volkswagen, 4 cylinder, rear-mounted, twin carb, air-cooled, rear-mounted boxer engine; rear-wheel drive, automatic or manual transmission; 4-wheel independent suspension.

=== Bufori V6i (1992–1994) ===
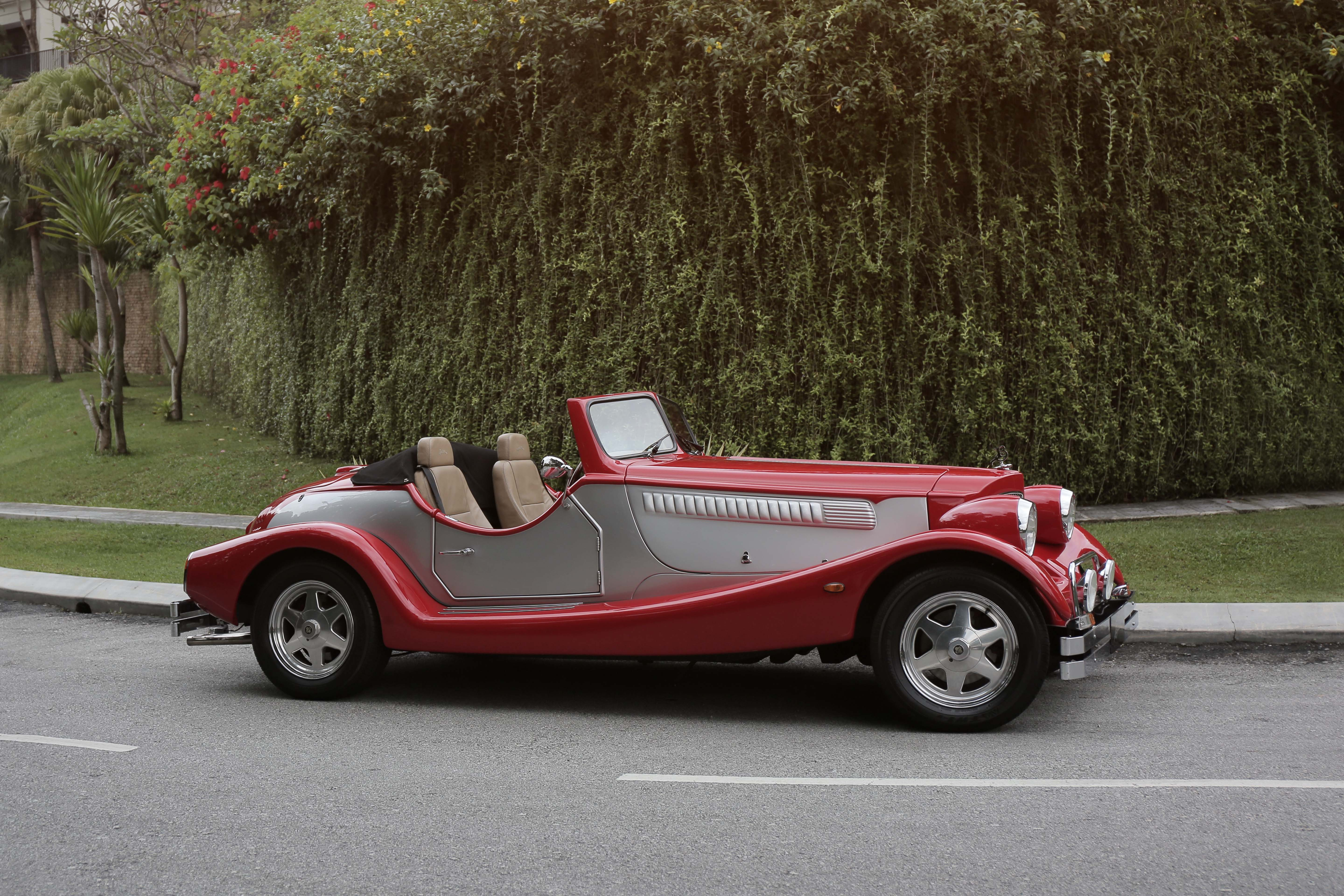
Bufori V6i in Red and Silver with open top.

2+2-seat convertible with retractable soft top; 3.8L, Buick V6, EFI, water-cooled, front-mounted engine; rear wheel drive; 4-wheel independent suspension.

=== Bufori MK II – Series 1 and Series 2 (1992–2003) ===
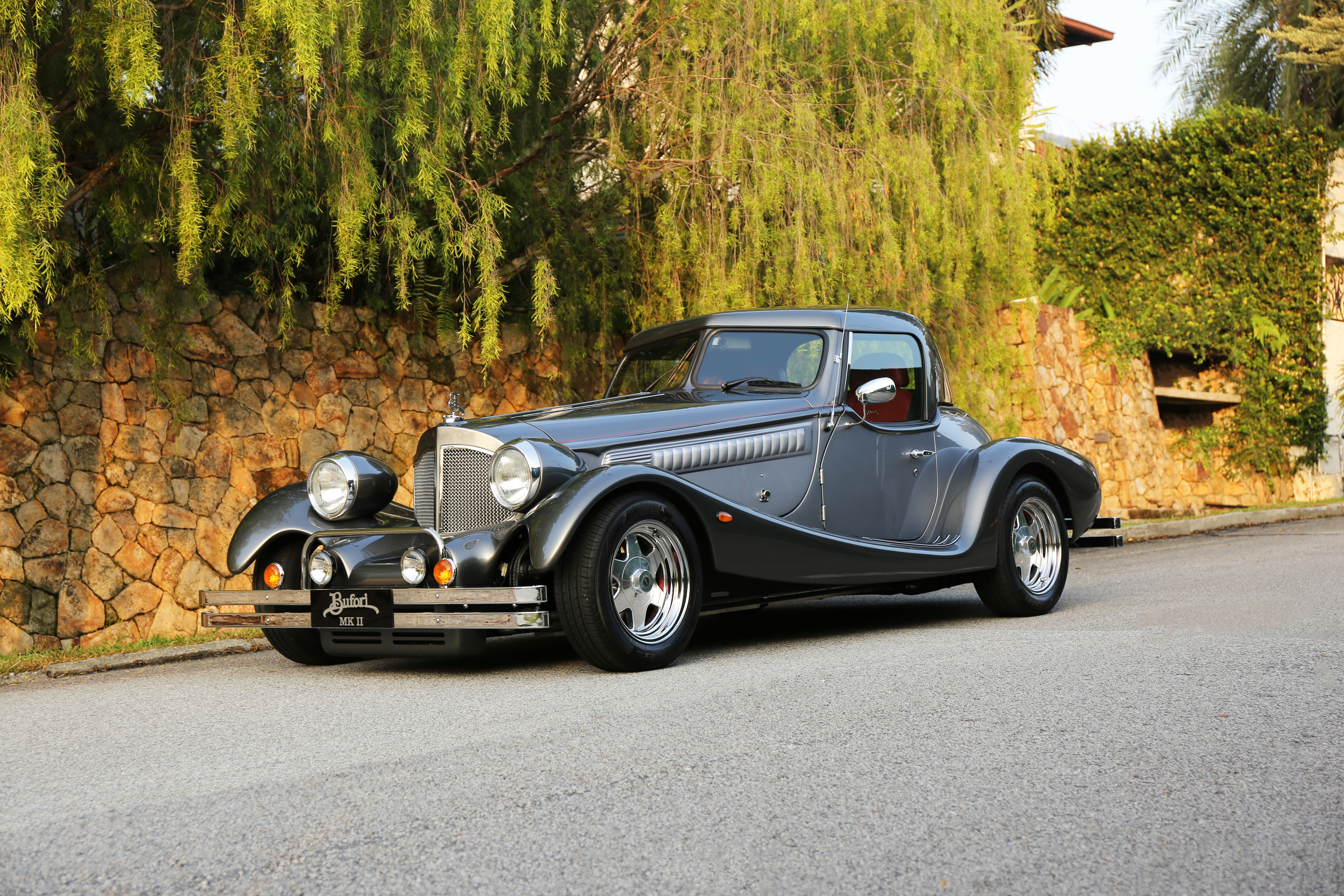
Bufori MK II in two tone Grey with fitted hard top.

Two- and 2+2-seat convertible with soft top or removable hard top; 1.8 – 2.2L, 4 cylinder, DOHC, EFI, water-cooled, rear-mounted Subaru boxer engine; rear wheel drive; automatic or manual transmission; 4-wheel independent suspension.

=== Bufori MKIII La Joya (2004 – 2026) ===
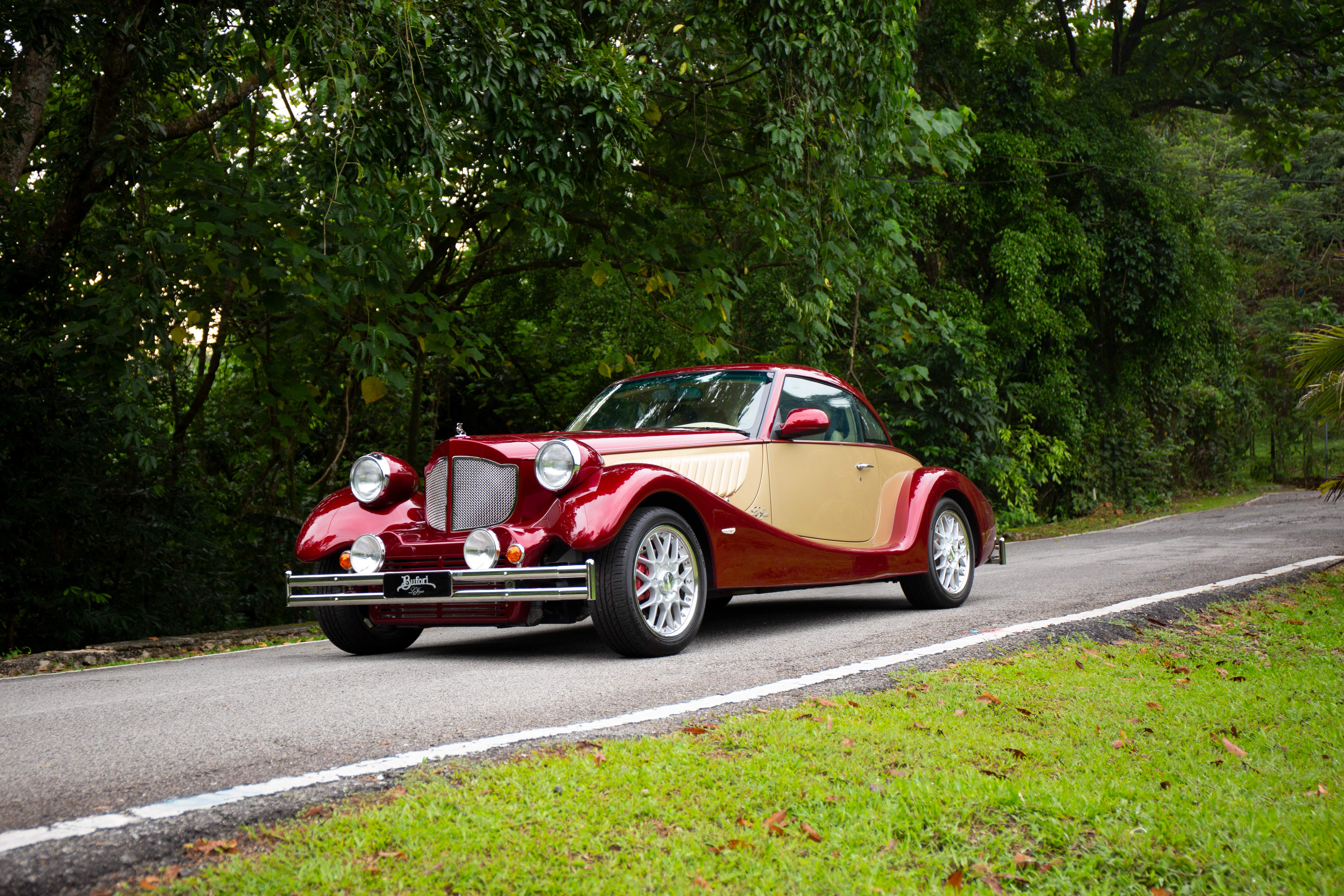
Bufori MKIII La Joya in Burgundy and Gold.

Two-seat coupe; 2.7L, Hyundai G6BA, V6, EFI, quad cam, water-cooled, mid-mounted engine; rear wheel drive; tiptronic transmission, 4-wheel independent suspension, Carbon Fibre and Kevlar composite body, spaceframe chassis, ABS, EBD, traction control, cruise control, Bluetooth set, tyre pressure monitoring system.

=== Bufori BMS R1 (2009) ===
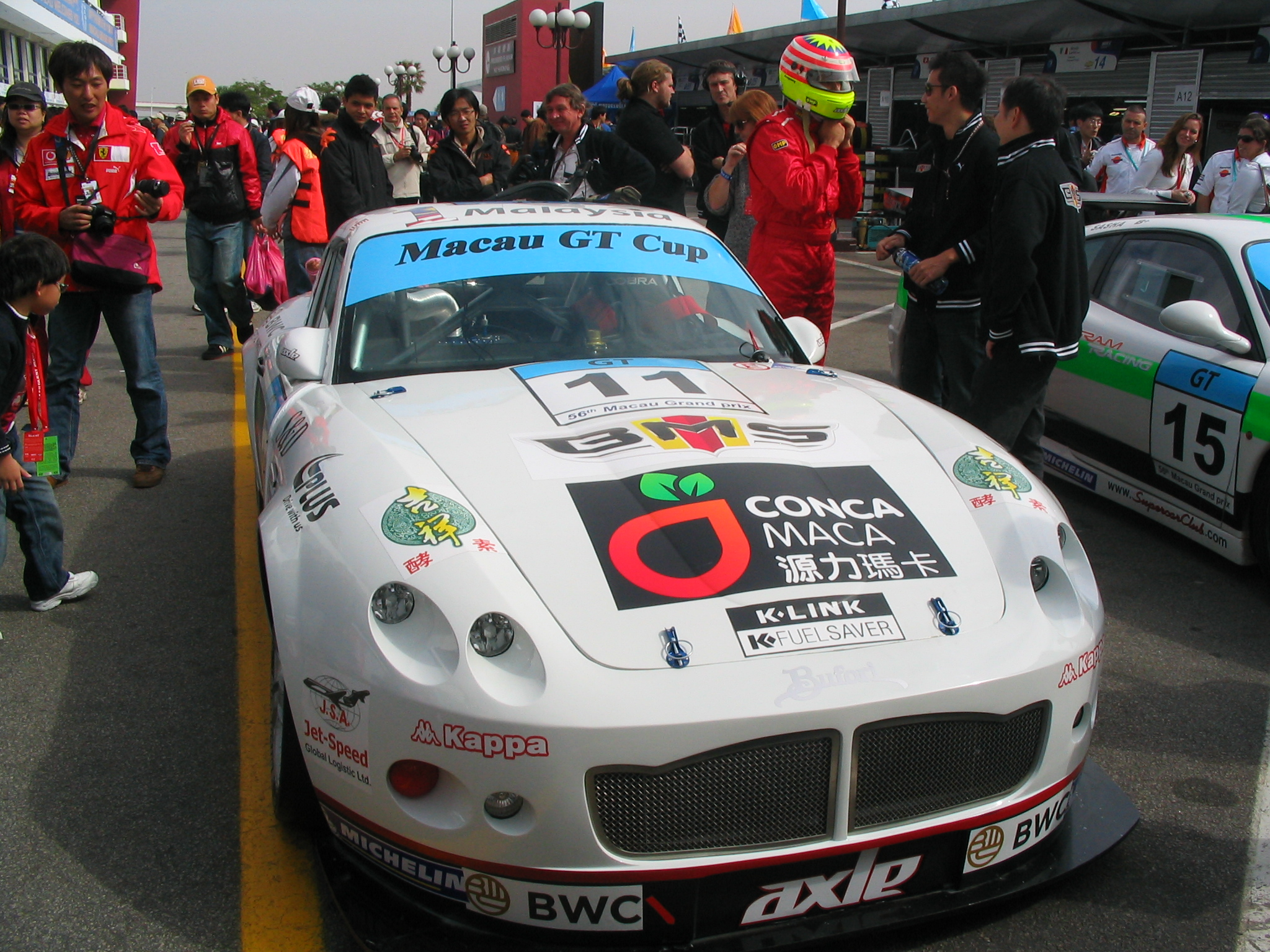
Alex Yoong with the Bufori BMS R1 race car.

The Bufori BMS R1 is the race derivative of the CS project before being unveiled as Bufori CS8 sports car. The car is a joint effort between Bufori Motor Sports (BMS) and Axle Motorsports. The BMS R1 made its global racing debut at the 2009 Macau Grand Prix with Alex Yoong as its driver.

== See also ==
- Official Bufori website
- List of automobile manufacturers
