= Tomcar =

Brand of commercial off-road utility vehicle

- Industry: Automotive
- Founded: 1991; 35 years ago
- Products: Off-road utility vehicles
- Website: www.tomcar.com

The Tomcar (stylized as TOMCAR) is a commercial off-road utility vehicle manufacturer. The name was used earlier on a French 50cc Microcar which can be operated without a license.

Tomcar is a manufacturer of off-road UTV vehicles. All Tomcars have a fully welded frame and roll cage utilizing steel on load-bearing components and an aluminum skid plate for impact protection.

Uses for Tomcars range from mining companies, cinematographers, recreational hunters, to special operations forces.

== History and operations ==
Tomcar was founded in Givat HaShlosha, Israel by Yoram Zarhi in 1991. The company has a workshop in Israel, a manufacturing plant in Arizona, United States, and a planned assembly plant in Dubai, United Arab Emirates.

Tomcars are used by the United States Marine Corps. They were also purchased by the British armed forces for use in Afghanistan, among other operations. They were used to retrieve supply drops. These were later sold in the private sector.

== Models ==
The Tomcar TM, the original Tomcar, is a 2WD 2, 4, or 6 seater vehicle with varying cargo space and both combustion and electric powertrain options.

The Tomcar TX is a 4WD vehicle. The TX has 17" ground clearance, 4-wheel independent suspension, a one-piece fully welded frame and roll cage, an aluminum skid plate, a lower center of gravity, and a one-ton payload.

== Gallery ==
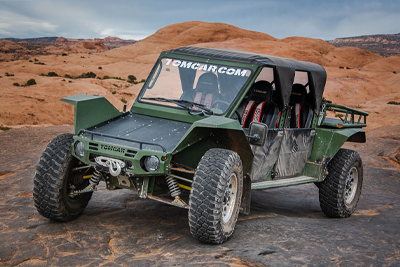
Tomcar TX4

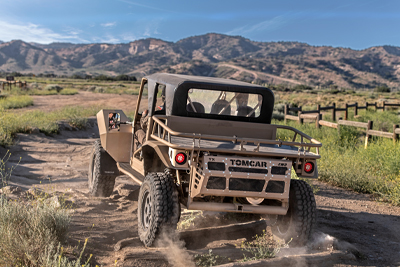
The 4WD Tomcar TX

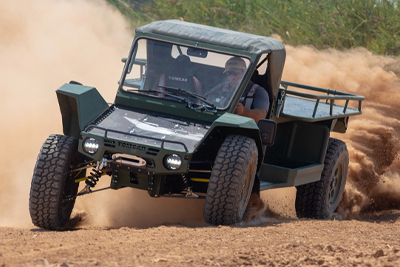

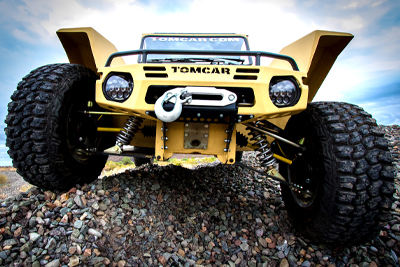

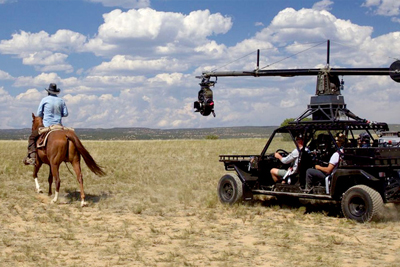
Filming a movie
