= Samuel Smith =

Samuel Smith may refer to:

== In politics ==
- Samuel Smith (Connecticut politician) (1646–1735), early settler of Norwalk, Connecticut and deputy of the General Assembly of the Colony of Connecticut in 1691
- Samuel Smith (1754–1834), British member of parliament (MP) for Leicester, Malmesbury, Midhurst, St Germans and Wendover
- Samuel Smith (Liberal politician) (1836–1906), British MP for Liverpool, 1882–1885 and Flintshire, 1886–1906
- Samuel Smith Jr., American politician; Democratic member of the Indiana Senate, 1998–2008
- Samuel Hardman Smith (1868–1956), Canadian politician; municipal politician in Edmonton
- Sam Smith (American politician), state legislator in Washington state and Seattle city councilman
- Sam Smith (Australian politician) (1857–1916), member of the New South Wales Legislative Assembly, Australia
- Samuel Smith (New York politician), mayor of the City of Brooklyn, New York, US, 1850
- Samuel Smith (Maryland politician) (1752–1839), U.S. senator and representative from Maryland
- Samuel Smith (New Hampshire politician) (1765–1842), U.S. representative from New Hampshire
- Samuel Smith (Pennsylvania politician), U.S. representative from Pennsylvania, 1805–1811
- Samuel Smith (Upper Canada politician) (1756–1826), American-born Canadian politician; Administrator of Upper Canada, 1817–1818
- Samuel A. Smith (1795–1861), U.S. representative from Pennsylvania
- Samuel Axley Smith (1822–1863), U.S. representative from Tennessee
- Samuel E. Smith (1788–1860), American politician; governor of Maine, 1831–1834
- Samuel George Smith (1822–1900), MP for Aylesbury, 1859–1880
- Samuel H. Smith (politician) (born 1955), American politician; speaker of Pennsylvania House of Representatives
- Samuel James Smith (1897–1964), Australian politician, New South Wales MLC
- Samuel W. Smith (1852–1931), American politician; congressman from Michigan

== In education and academia ==
- Samuel Smith, father and son, both English priests and educators:
  - Samuel Smith (schoolmaster) (died 1808), headmaster of Westminster School
  - Samuel Smith (Dean of Christ Church) (1765–1841), Dean of Christ Church, Oxford
- Samuel Stanhope Smith (1751–1819), American educator; seventh president of the College of New Jersey (Princeton University)
- Samuel Roger Smith (1853–1916), co-founder and first president of Messiah College in Pennsylvania
- Sam Smith (psychologist) (1929–2012), second president of Athabasca University
- Samuel H. Smith (educator) (born 1940), American educator; president of Washington State University, 1985–2000
- Samuel L. Smith (1875–1956), school administrator, lawyer, author, and the supervisor and architect of Rosenwald schools in the Southern U.S.

== In other fields ==
- Sam Smith (painter) (1918–1999), American artist
- Samuel Smith (prison chaplain) (1620–1698), ordinary of Newgate prison
- Samuel Smith (photographer) (1802–1892), English photographer a.k.a. 'Philosopher' Smith
- Samuel Francis Smith (1808–1895), American Baptist minister and writer
- Samuel Harrison Smith (printer) (1772–1845), American journalist and newspaper publisher
- Samuel Smith (chemist) (1927–2005), American scientist; co-inventor of Scotchgard
- Samuel Walter Johnson Smith (1871–1948), English physicist
- Samuel Smith (watchmaker) (died 1875), founder of Smiths Group
- Samuel H. Smith (Latter Day Saints) (1808–1844), US, brother of Joseph Smith, Jr.
- Samuel J. Smith, Baptist missionary, printer and publisher in Siam
- Samuel Pountney Smith (1812–1883), English architect
- Samuel Smith (winemaker) (1812–1889), winemaker in the colony of South Australia
- African-American victim of the Lynching of Samuel Smith (1924)
- Samuel Timothy Smith, birth name of Tim McGraw (born 1967), American country singer

== See also ==
- Sam Smith (disambiguation)
- Samantha Smith (disambiguation)
- Samuel Smith Old Brewery, British brewery founded by a local brewer of the same name
- Samuel L. Smith House, home of Michigan entrepreneur
- Samuels-Smith
