= Sammy Smith (disambiguation) =

Sammy Smith (born 2004) is an American racing driver.

Sammy Smith may also refer to:

- Sammy Smith (soccer, born 2001), American soccer player
- Sammy Smith (soccer, born 2005), American soccer player and skier
- Sammi Smith (1943–2005), American country singer
- Sammy Smyth (1925–2016), Irish footballer
- Sammy Smyth (loyalist) (c. 1929–1986), Northern Irish loyalist activist
- Sammy Smith, founder of Smith Custom Amplifiers

== See also ==
- Sam Smith (disambiguation)
- Samuel Smith (disambiguation)
- Samantha Smith (disambiguation)
