= Samuel H. Smith =

Samuel H. Smith may refer to:

- Samuel H. Smith (educator) (born 1940), president of Washington State University, 1985–2000
- Samuel H. Smith (Latter Day Saints) (1808–44), Book of Mormon witness, missionary, and brother of Joseph Smith, Jr.
- Samuel H. Smith (politician) (born 1955), member of Pennsylvania House of Representatives
- Samuel Harrison Smith (printer), American journalist and newspaper publisher, founded the National Intelligencer

== See also ==
- Sam Smith (disambiguation)
