= 2020 U.S. Cross Country Junior National Championships =

2020 skiing youth championship

- Venue: Auburn Ski Club Training Center
- Location: Truckee, California
- Dates: 8–14 March

The 2020 U.S. Cross Country Junior National Championships were held from 8 to 14 March 2020 in Truckee, California at the Auburn Ski Club Training Center. On 12 March, halfway through the championships, U.S. Ski and Snowboard announced that all sanctioned events scheduled prior to 16 March would proceed as planned, even amidst growing concerns due to the spread of COVID-19. Later that same day, all remaining U.S. domestic events were cancelled.

== Competition schedule ==
Date	Event	Technique	Distance						Notes
Date	Event	Technique	U20		U18		U16		Notes
Date	Event	Technique	Boys	Girls	Boys	Girls	Boys	Girls	Notes
9 March 2020	Distance, interval start	Classic	10 km	5 km	10 km	5 km	5 km	5 km	
11 March 2020	Sprint	Free	1.3 km						
13 March 2020	Distance, mass start	Free	15 km	10 km	10 km	10 km	5 km	5 km	Cancelled
14 March 2020	Team relay	Classic	3 x 3 km						Cancelled

== Medal summary ==
=== Medal table ===
Rank	Division	Gold	Silver	Bronze	Total
1	New England	4	5	1	10
2	Alaska	2	5	3	10
3	Intermountain	3	1	1	5
4	Pacific Northwest	2	0	2	4
5	Rocky Mountain	0	1	2	3
6	Far West*	0	0	1	1
7	Great Lakes	0	0	1	1
8	Midwest	0	0	1	1
9	High Plains	0	0	0	0
10	Mid-Atlantic	0	0	0	0
Totals (10 Divisions)		11**	12	12	35

*Host Division

**Guest skier not counted towards total

=== U20 boys ===
Event	Gold		Silver		Bronze	
10 km Classic	Ari Endestad (Alaska)	26:02.3	Everett Cason (Alaska)	26:11.4	Kai Meyers (Alaska)	26:13.7
Sprint Free	Kai Meyers (Alaska)	3:25.45	Ari Endestad (Alaska)	2:58.63	August Schatzlein (Midwest)	3:02.13
15 km Free	-		-		-	
Team Relay Classic	-		-		-	

=== U20 girls ===
Event	Gold		Silver		Bronze	
5 km Classic	Anna Parent (Guest)	14:53.4	Pearl Harvey (Intermountain)	15:13.2	Johanna Craig (Great Lakes)	15:18.3
Sprint Free	Gretta Scholz (Pacific Northwest)	3:35.59	Abigail Streinz (New England)	3:37.51	Sarah Morgan (Intermountain)	3:41.08
10 km Free	-		-		-	
Team Relay Classic	-		-		-	

=== U18 boys ===
Event	Gold		Silver		Bronze	
10 km Classic	Will Koch (New England)	25:03.4	Alexander Maurer (Alaska)	25:25.9	Walker Hall (Pacific Northwest)	25:43.1
Sprint Free	Walker Hall (Pacific Northwest)	2:49.62	Will Koch (New England)	2:50.19	Michael Earnhart (Alaska)	2:57.07
10 km Free	-		-		-	
Team Relay Classic	-		-		-	

=== U18 girls ===
Event	Gold		Silver		Bronze	
5 km Classic	Nina Seemann (New England)	13:58.8	Emma Reeder (Rocky Mountain)	14:28.7	Kate Oldham (Rocky Mountain)	14:28.8
Sprint Free	Nina Seemann (New England)	3:30.96	Kendall Kramer (Alaska)	3:37.63	Annie McColgan (Pacific Northwest)	3:37.74
10 km Free	-		-		-	
Team Relay Classic	-		-		-	

=== U16 boys ===
Event	Gold		Silver		Bronze	
5 km Classic	Wes Campbell (Intermountain)	13:36.1	Jack Lange (New England)	13:39.3	Aaron Power (Alaska)	14:04.6
Sprint Free	Trey Jones (New England)	2:49.16	Fin Bailey (New England)	2:49.74	Matt Seline (Far West)	2:51.35
5 km Free	-		-		-	
Team Relay Classic	-		-		-	

=== U16 girls ===
Event	Gold		Silver		Bronze	
5 km Classic	Samantha Smith (Intermountain)	14:09.0	Sofia Scirica (New England)	14:53.7	Elsa Perkins (Rocky Mountain)	14:54.3
Sprint Free	Samantha Smith (Intermountain)	3:17.88	Maria Nedom (Alaska)	3:18.68	Sofia Scirica (New England)	3:20.75
5 km Free	-		-		-	
Team Relay Classic	-		-		-	

=== Alaska Cup ===
Since 1986, the Alaska Cup has been awarded to the outstanding Division at the Junior Nationals. Alaska Cup points are awarded to the top 20 skiers in each race. Guest skiers do not receive or displace Alaska Cup points.

Division	Distance, Interval Start, Classic	Sprint, Free	Distance, Mass Start, Free	Team Relay, Classic	Grand Total
Alaska	338	259			597
Far West	27	73			100
Great Lakes	51	47			98
High Plains	10	1			11
Intermountain	227	218			445
Mid-Atlantic	4	8			12
Midwest	113	134			247
New England	284	303			587
Pacific Northwest	100	175			275
Rocky Mountain	214	150			364
