= Smiths Group =

British engineering company

Smiths Group plc
- Type: Public limited company
- Traded as: LSE: SMIN; FTSE 100 Component
- Industry: Engineering
- Founded: 1851; 175 years ago (London)
- Founder: Samuel Smith
- Headquarters: London, England, UK
- Area served: Worldwide
- Key people: Steve Williams (Chairman); Roland Carter (CEO)
- Products: Rotating equipment; Engineered components
- Revenue: ▲£1,937 million (2026)
- Operating income: ▲£399 million (2026)
- Net income: ▼£157 million (2026)
- Number of employees: 16,000 (2026)
- Divisions: John Crane Inc. Flex-Tek
- Website: www.smiths.com

Smiths Group plc is a British, multinational, diversified engineering business headquartered in London, England. It operates in over 50 countries and employs approximately 16,000 staff. Smiths Group is listed on the London Stock Exchange and is a constituent of the FTSE 100 Index.

Smiths Group has its origins in a jewellery shop, S Smith & Sons, which was founded by the watchmaker and businessman Samuel Smith. Supplying its precision watches to various clients, including the Admiralty, the business quickly grew and expanded into a major provider of timepieces, diamonds, and automotive instrumentation. On 21 July 1914, the business became a public limited company, holding onto this status for over a hundred years. Significant restructuring of Smiths Group took place during the 1950s, the foundations of Smiths Medical Systems division were laid while Smiths Aviation and Smiths Marine were organised as separate divisions. Throughout much of the twentieth century, Smiths Group was the principal supplier of instruments to the British motorcar and motorcycle industries, organising itself as Smiths Industries Ltd in 1960.

By the late 1970s, the markets for clocks, watches, and automotive instruments had progressively decreased to the point where little of Smith's revenue came from these sources; Smiths Industries decided to cease its involvement as a direct supplier of Europe's automotive industry in the early 1980s. The medical division of Smiths Group was acquired by ICU Medical in January 2022. In 2026, Smiths Interconnect was sold to Molex, and Smiths Detection was sold to CVC Capital Partners. Following the sale of Smiths Interconnect and Smiths Detection, the business' operations are now primarily in industrial technologies. Its John Crane division focuses on rotating equipment, while Flex‑Tek focusses on engineered components.

== History ==
=== S Smith & Sons ===
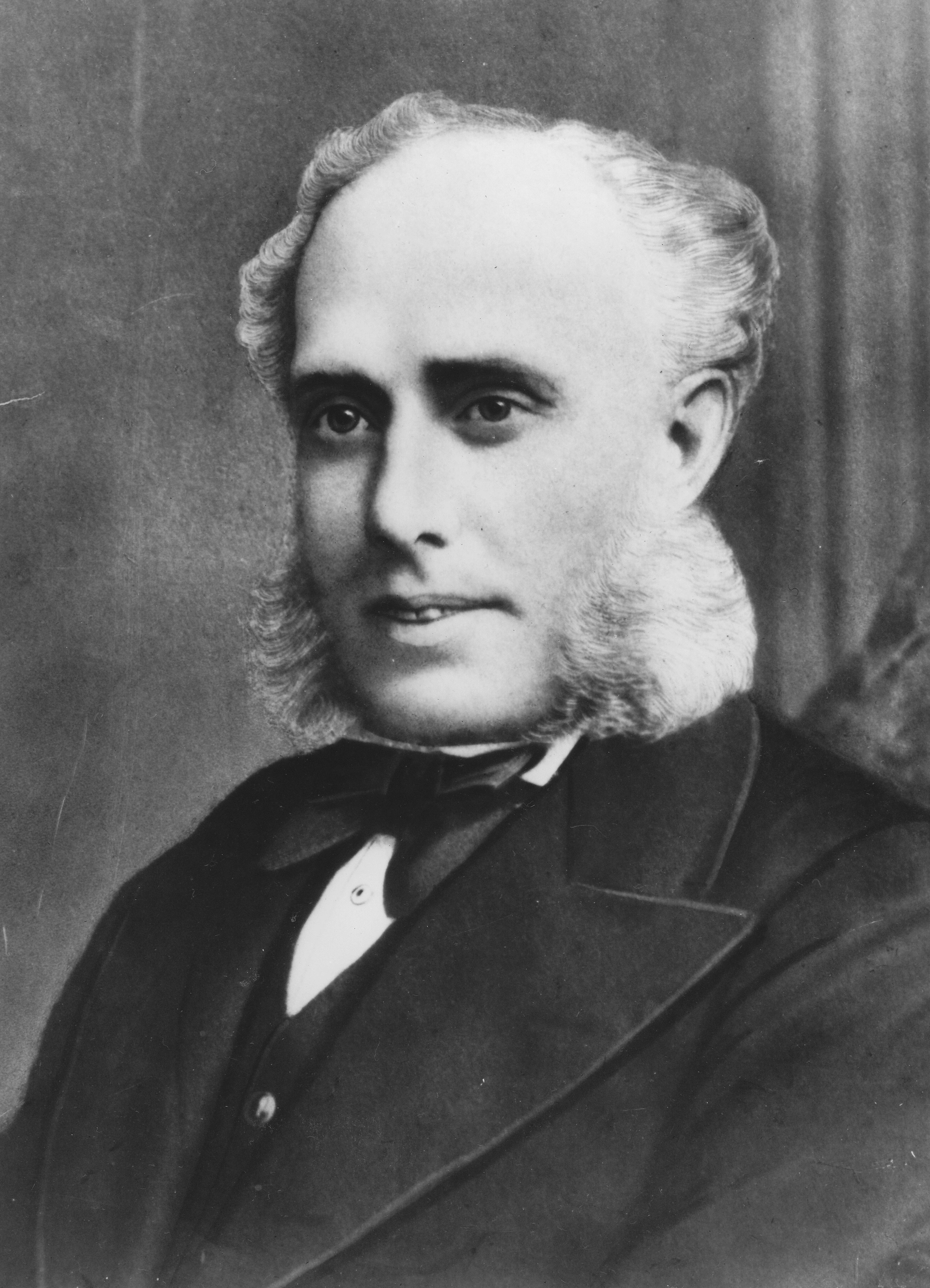
Samuel Smith (1826–75), founder of Smiths Group

The watch chronometer and instrument retailer's business was established by Samuel Smith as a jewellery shop at 12 Newington Causeway in south east London in 1851. In 1875, Samuel Smith died at the age of 49; during his time in control of the firm, it had experienced a rapid rate of growth. During 1872, it relocated the centre of its operations to 85 The Strand, next door to the premises of Charles Frodsham. In 1885, a large business operating as diamond merchants emerged, based at 6 Grand Hotel Buildings, Trafalgar Square, and from 1895 at 68 Piccadilly.

The companies produced a range of high quality precision watches; perhaps the most major customer for these was the Admiralty. Its precision watches were typically manufactured by Nicole Nielsen of Soho Square. During 1904, retailing and wholesaling of Smiths-branded motor accessories was launched; Nicole Nielsen produced Smiths' initial speedometer, the Perfect Speed Indicator; the first of which was delivered to Edward VII, the reigning British monarch, for the Royal Mercedes.

During 1907, in order to satisfy the high demands for its products, Nicole Nielsen had to open a new factory in Watford. Around this time, Smiths also began to manufacture some of their own motor products, particularly speedometers. Starting in 1913, all motor accessories activities were carried out from handsome purpose-built premises at Speedometer House, 179-185 Great Portland Street ("Motor Row"). The premises in the Strand became a Lyons tearoom, but the jewellers' establishments were retained at Trafalgar Square and 68 Piccadilly. By this time, motor accessories production included Smiths multiple-jet carburettors (designed by Trier & Martin), lighting sets, headlamps, sidelights, tail lights, dynamo and electric starters, generators and the Smith's Auto-Clear mechanical horn.

On 21 July 1914, Smiths Group was floated on the London Stock Exchange; the organisation has been present on the exchange for over one hundred years.

=== First half of 20th century ===
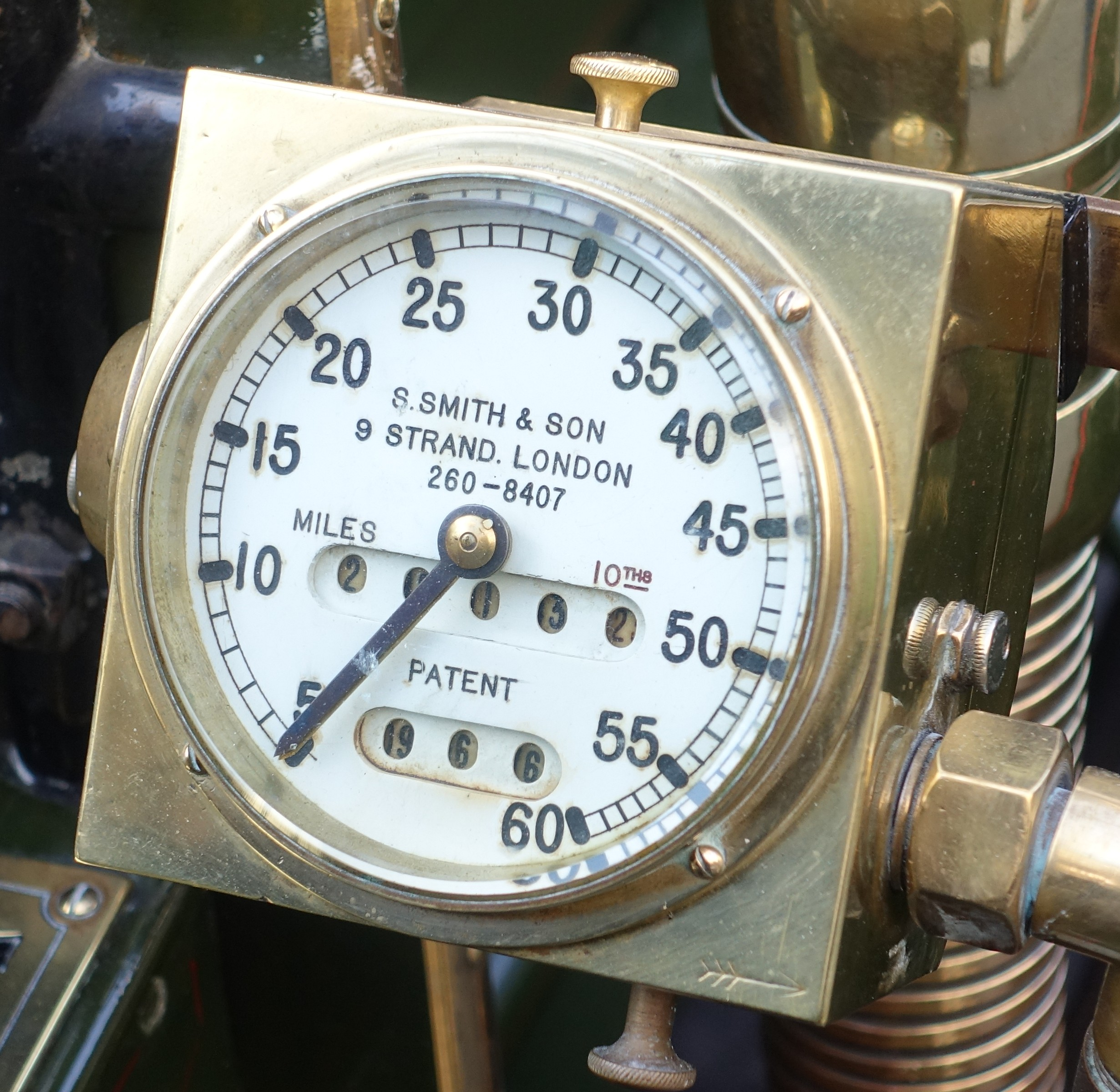
Nicole Nielsen speedometer, badged for S. Smith & Son, c.1907

The outbreak of the First World War in 1914 contributed to Smiths Group making gains in multiple markets around the world that had been previously held by the German competition. By 1915, new contracts issued by the British War Office for aeroplane accessories, lighting sets, and munitions required the speedy erection of a new freehold factory. This new factory, known as Cricklewood Works, was built at Cricklewood, north London. In 1921, the firm's Great Portland Street activities were moved to Cricklewood following the purchase of the former Metallurgique works alongside their Cricklewood Works. During the Interwar period, the company's accessories became standard fittings in new cars all provided by the manufacturer.

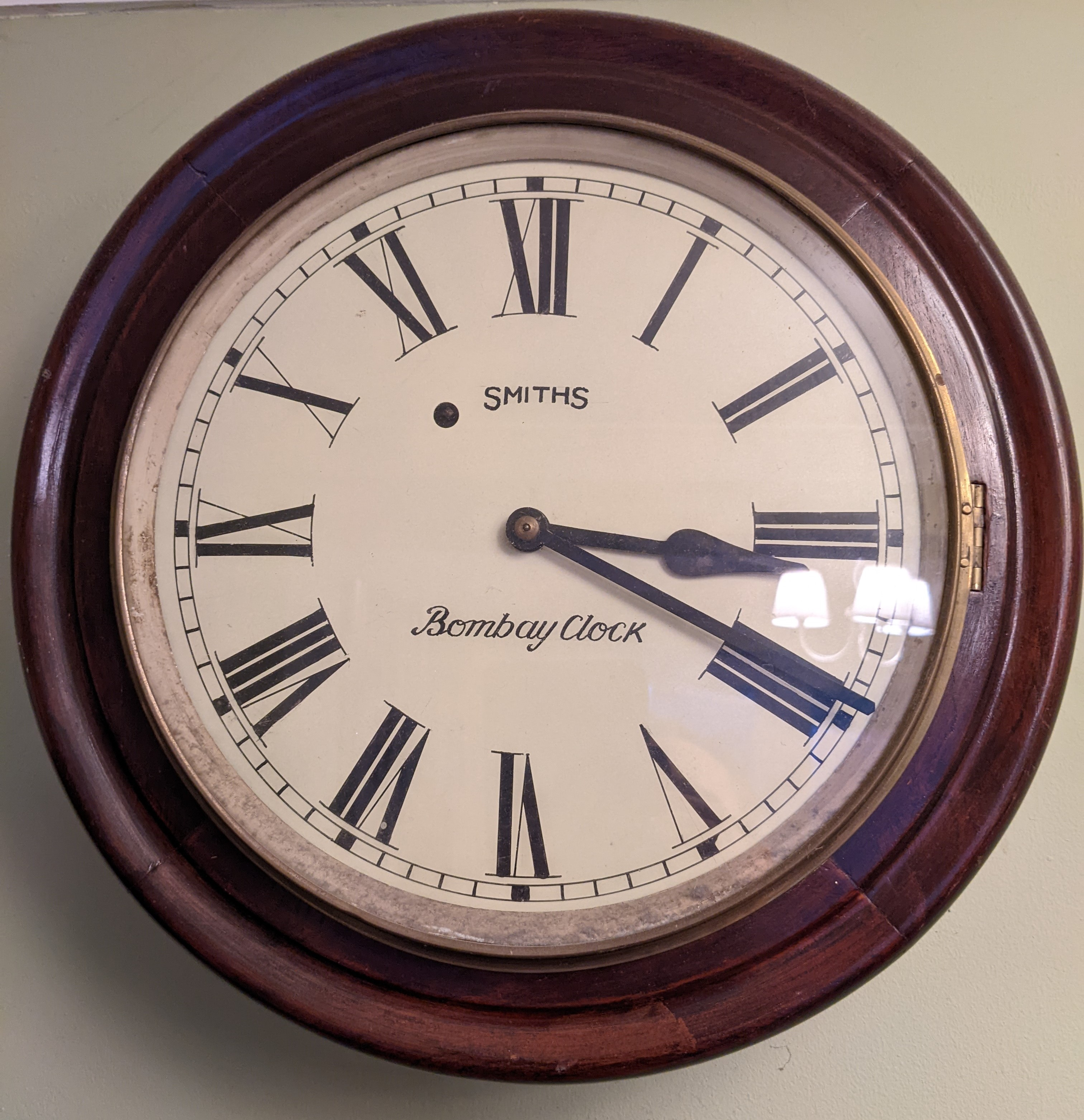
Smiths "Bombay" Wallclock, c.1920

At the start of the 20th century, the age of the early automobiles, Smith & Sons retailed one of the first British odometers ("mileometer") and speedometer. In the 1930s, Smiths agreed a trading deal with British rival manufacturer Lucas whereby the two would not compete in certain areas, while Lucas took on part of Smiths non-instrumentation assets.

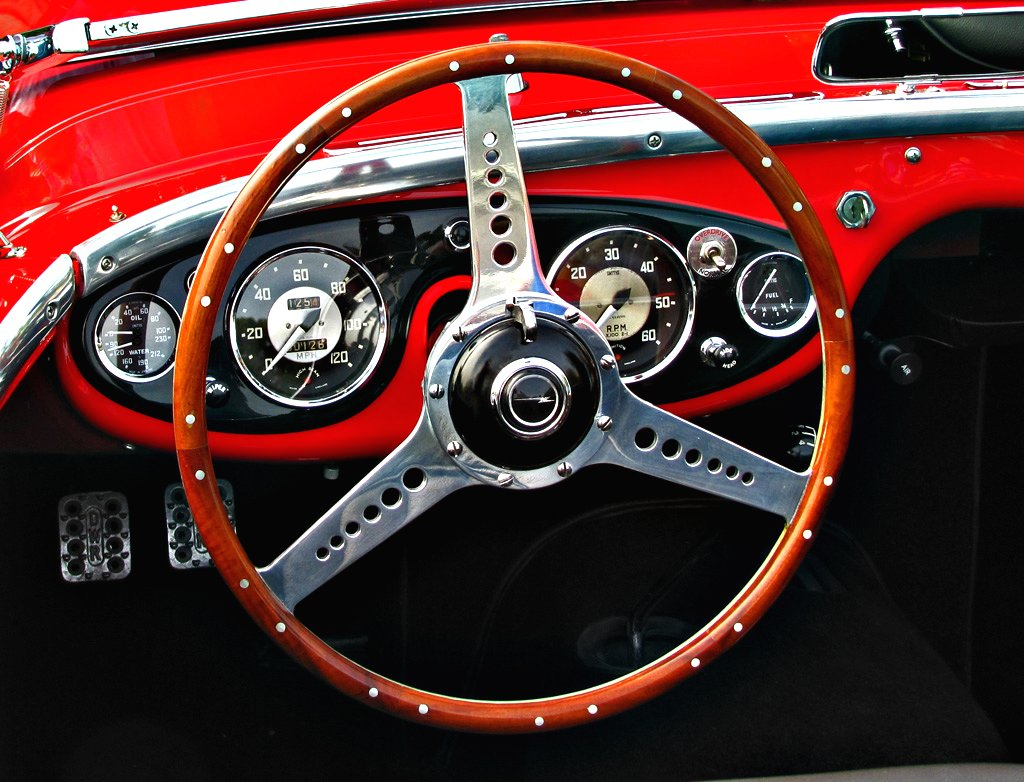
Instruments by Smiths Instruments 1955

Smiths became the dominant supplier of instruments to British motorcar and motorcycle firms. These later 20th century instruments carried a distinctive logo, the word "SMITHS" centred above the middle of the dial and silk screened onto it in a unique house font familiar to generations of drivers.

During 1919, the distribution rights for the KLG Sparking Plug were purchased from Kenelm Lee Guinness. Smiths purchased 75 per cent of Ed. Jaeger (London) Ltd in 1927 (which became British Jaeger Instrument Company in 1932). Also in 1927, Smiths purchased the KLG Sparking Plug Company (Robinhood Engineering). The Jackall hydraulic jacking system was manufactured from 1935 by Smith's Jacking Systems and immediately became standard equipment in many popular cars. In 1937, a separate aircraft and marine department was created in the parent company and named Smiths Aircraft Instruments. It operated with Smiths subsidiary Henry Hughes and Son, who manufactured various instruments for the aviation and marine markets.

In 1946, Smiths and the Ingersoll Watch Company founded the Anglo-Celtic Watch Co. Ltd., which produced watches in Wales. At one point, this venture was one of the largest producers of watches in Europe and employed as many as 1,420 employees at its height; however, the Anglo-Celtic Watch Co. Ltd. was closed down in 1980.

=== Second half of 20th century ===
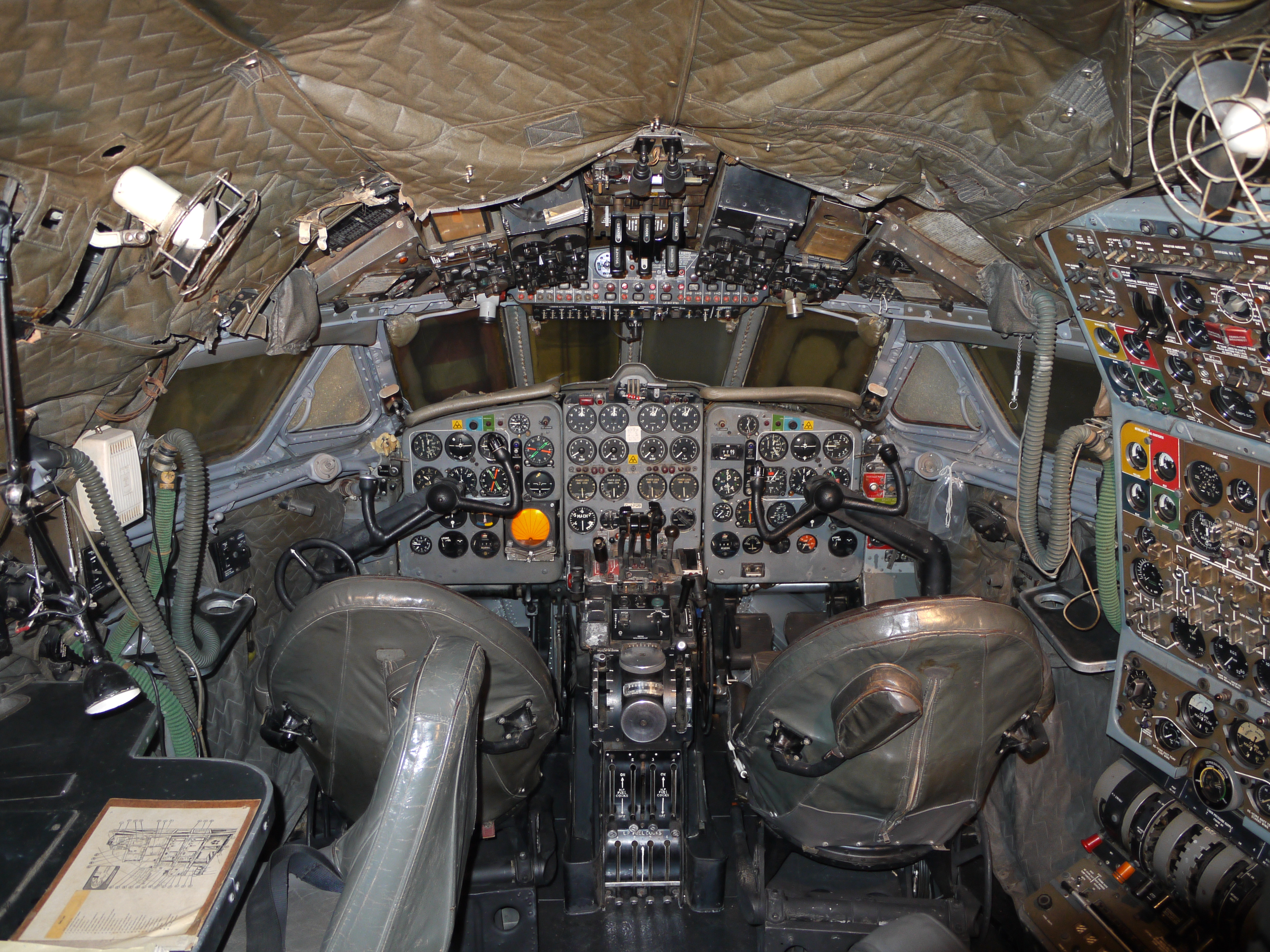
1949 de Havilland Comet instruments by S. Smith & Son

One of Smiths' "De Luxe" wristwatches was worn by Edmund Hillary on his successful ascent of Mount Everest (Rolex also supplied watches but the only watch worn to the summit was a Smiths).

The 1950s was a period of significant restructuring for Smiths Group; in 1958, Smiths Aviation and Smiths Marine were organised as separate divisions. During that same year, the business acquired a majority stake in Portland Plastics; the firm would become the foundations of Smiths Medical Systems division.

In 1960, the company formed a new Industrial division, the principal focus of which was the development and production of industrial instrumentation. As a measure to reflect its increasing diversification and international operations, the name Smiths Industries Ltd was adopted for the company in 1967. At the time of this name change, the company's advertised product range comprised: automotive – aerospace – marine – building – medical – clocks – watches – appliance controls – industrial instruments – ceramics – electronics.

By the late 1970s, the markets for clocks, watches, and automotive instruments had progressively decreased to the point where little of Smith's revenue came from these sources. The importance of the UK market was also diminishing for the company; by the early 1980s, 40 per cent of the profits of Smiths Industries were attributed to its overseas markets. In line with these business trends, the company embarked on a further round of restructuring during this period, leading to the adoption of a decentralised structure and looser management style.

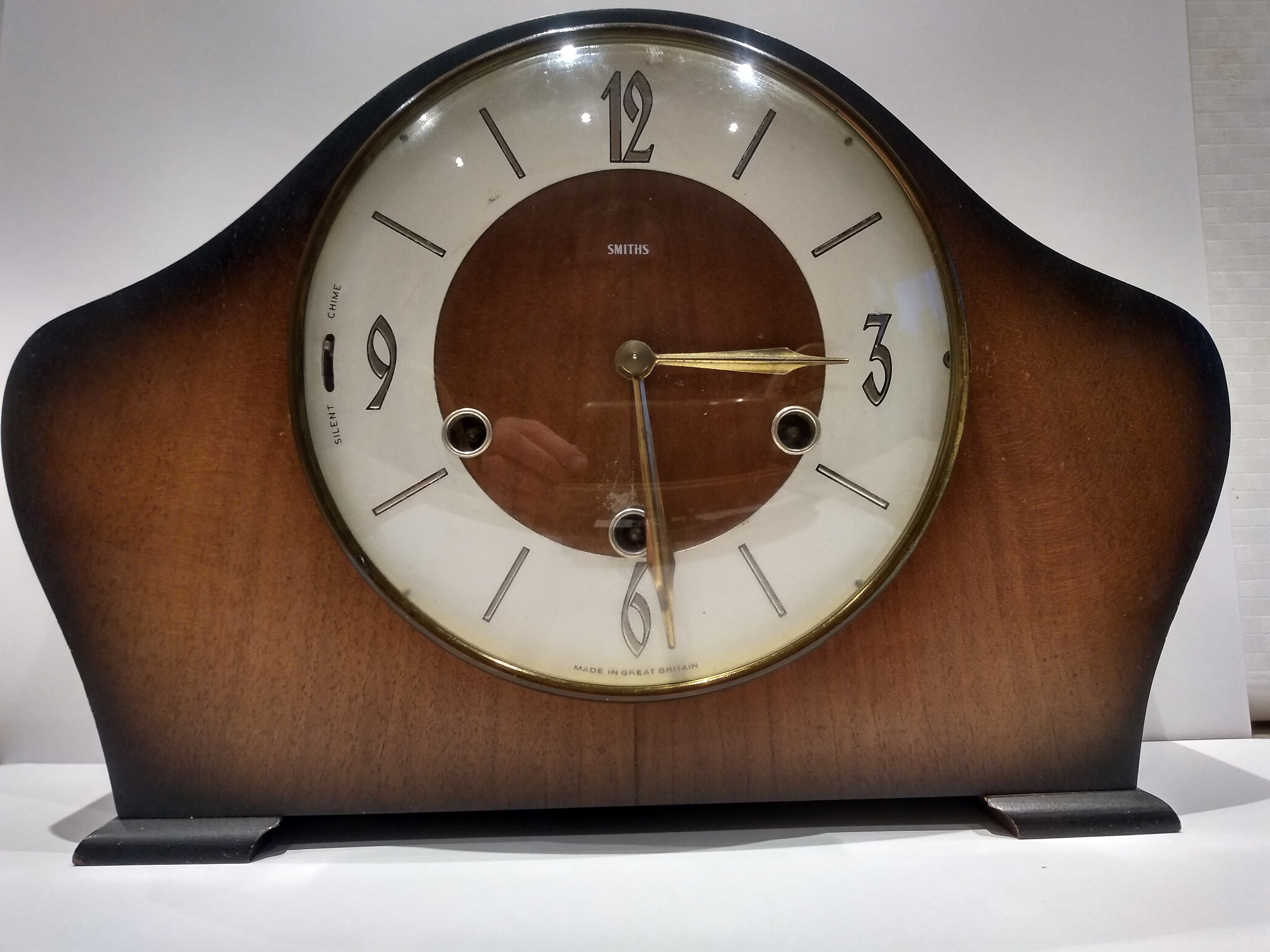
Amberly clock made by Smiths, view of the front with the door closed

During 1983, Smiths Industries decided to cease its involvement as a direct supplier of Europe's automotive industry, selling on its automotive instrument division; the division was initially acquired by Lucas and subsequently by the factory employees themselves. They formed a new company, Caerbont Automotive Instruments, which has continued to produce classic Smiths-branded instruments for decades with the blessing of Smiths Group plc.

In 1984, Smiths Industries was reorganised into three principal operating divisions: Industrial, Medical Systems, and Aerospace and Defence. To strengthen and grow these divisions, the company proceeded with multiple acquisitions throughout the late 1980s and 1990s. In 1987, Smiths Industries purchased Lear Siegler Holdings Corp, an American avionics specialist; during 1994, Deltec, an American medical devices business, was also acquired by the firm.

=== 21st century ===
On 30 November 2000, the company's name was changed to Smiths Group plc. On 4 December 2000, it was announced that Smiths had completed a merger with TI Group, which held interests in aerospace, industrial seals and automotive parts. During the following year, Smiths Group transferred its newly acquired automotive business into a separate corporate entity, creating TI Automotive, ahead of plans to dispose of it. In July 2002, Smiths Group established a fourth division, Smiths Detection, which specialised in producing sensors and other equipment for the detection of weapons, explosives, contraband, and various hazardous substances.

At the start of the 2000s, Smith's aerospace subsidiary, Smiths Aerospace, was a growing sector of the group; it supplied both military and civilian aerospace markets, having deliberately aimed for a 50/50 split between the two sectors. By 2002, roughly half of the division's revenue was reportedly being sourced from the North American market. Historically, Smiths Group was positioned as a first-tier aerospace supplier, frequently seeking out relevant acquisition opportunities to further its presence in the field. In October 2004, Smiths Aerospace purchased Integrated Aerospace, an American equipment supplier. In early 2007, GE Aviation, a division of American conglomerate General Electric, announced that it was acquiring Smiths Aerospace for US$4.8 billion. Smiths Group stated that it chose to sell its aerospace division, which was profitable at the time, in order to invest in other areas of the business. This transference of ownership required approval from anti-trust regulators in both Europe and the US.

In September 2011, Smiths Group acquired the American-based power technology enterprise, Power Holdings Inc., for £145 million. On 21 April 2016, it was announced that Smiths Group was in the process of acquiring Morpho Detection LLC, a US-based subsidiary of Safran; it was integrated into the Smiths Detection division.

During the 2010s, Smiths Group substantially ramped up investment in its research and development programmes. As a part of these efforts, it has established a Digital Forge in California. By 2018, the company was reportedly deriving 15 per cent of its income from its new product development efforts; management has stated their intention for 40 per cent of future revenue to be gained through such sources.

In January 2022, ICU Medical completed the acquisition of the medical division of Smiths Group.

Following the Russian invasion of Ukraine in February 2022, the company continued to operate in Russia through its subsidiary John Crane Iskra LLC, which is 50% owned by the Smiths Group.

Smiths Group provided components for the landing of the Chandrayaan-3 mission on the dark side of the moon in August 2023.

In October 2025, Smiths Interconnect, which produces connector devices for rugged environments, was sold to Molex. The acquisition was completed in April 2026.

In December 2025, the company announced the sale of its security scanning division, Smiths Detection, to the private equity company, CVC Capital Partners, for £2 billion. Smiths Group was expecting to return a "large part of [the] proceeds" to shareholders. The sale was completed in June 2026.

The company was involved in NASA's April 2026 Artemis II mission, providing the Propellant Management Devices (PMDs) in the Orion spacecraft with specialised filtration sieves.

== Operations ==
Smiths Group is organised into two separate divisions, namely: John Crane, which provides rotating equipment, and Flex-Tek, which supplies engineered components.

== Management ==
In 2015, Smiths appointed Andrew Reynolds Smith its CEO. Smith replaced Philip Bowman. Immediately before joining Smiths, Smith was CEO of GKN Automotive. In May 2021, Smiths appointed Paul Keel as its CEO, replacing Andrew Reynolds Smith. Prior to joining Smiths, Keel was group president of 3M's Consumer Division Group. In March 2024, Roland Carter replaced Keel as CEO: Carter had worked at the company for over 30 years and was previously president of Smiths Detection and Smiths Interconnect.
