= Sam Smith (disambiguation) =

Sam Smith (born 1992) is an English singer and songwriter.

Sam Smith may also refer to:

== Arts ==
- Sam Smith (actor) (born 1989), English child actor
- Sam Smith (Australian actor), known for Jirga (2018)
- Sam Smith (artist), Australian artist
- Sam Smith (comedian), New Zealand comedian and writer
- Sam Smith (painter) (1918–1999), American painter
- Sam Smith (toymaker) (1908–1983), artist, sculptor and toymaker
- Samuel Smith (photographer) (1802–1892), English photographer

== Media and politics ==
- Sam Smith (journalist) (born 1937), American journalist and activist
- Sam Smith (sportswriter) (born 1948), American sports journalist for the Chicago Tribune
- Sam Smith (American politician) (1922–1995), state legislator from Washington
- Sam Smith (Australian politician) (1857–1916), Australian union official and politician

== Sports ==
=== Association football ===
- Sam Smith (footballer, born 1904) (1904–1988), English footballer with Cardiff City and Port Vale
- Sam Smith (footballer, born 1909) (1909–1994), English footballer with Birmingham, Norwich City and Walsall
- Sam Smith (footballer, born 1998), English footballer for Cambridge United, Reading, and Wrexham
- Sammy Smith (soccer, born 2001), American soccer player
- Sammy Smith (soccer, born 2005), American soccer player and skier

=== Other sports ===
- Sam Smith (basketball, born 1943) (1943–2022), American basketball player in the ABA
- Sam Smith (basketball, born 1955), American basketball player in the NBA
- Sam Smith (rugby league) (1926–1989), British rugby league footballer
- Sam Smith (rugby union) (born 1990), English rugby union player
- Sam Smith (tennis) (born 1971), British tennis player

== Other fields ==
- Sam Smith (psychologist) (1929–2012), Canadian academic
- Sam Smith (businesswoman) (born 1974), British CEO of FinnCap

== See also ==
- Samuel Smith Old Brewery, commonly known as Sam Smith's, a brewer in England
- Samuel Smith (disambiguation)
- Samantha Smith (disambiguation)
- Sam Roberts-Smith (born 1985), Australian operatic baritone
