= Bergmann-Metallurgique =

German company

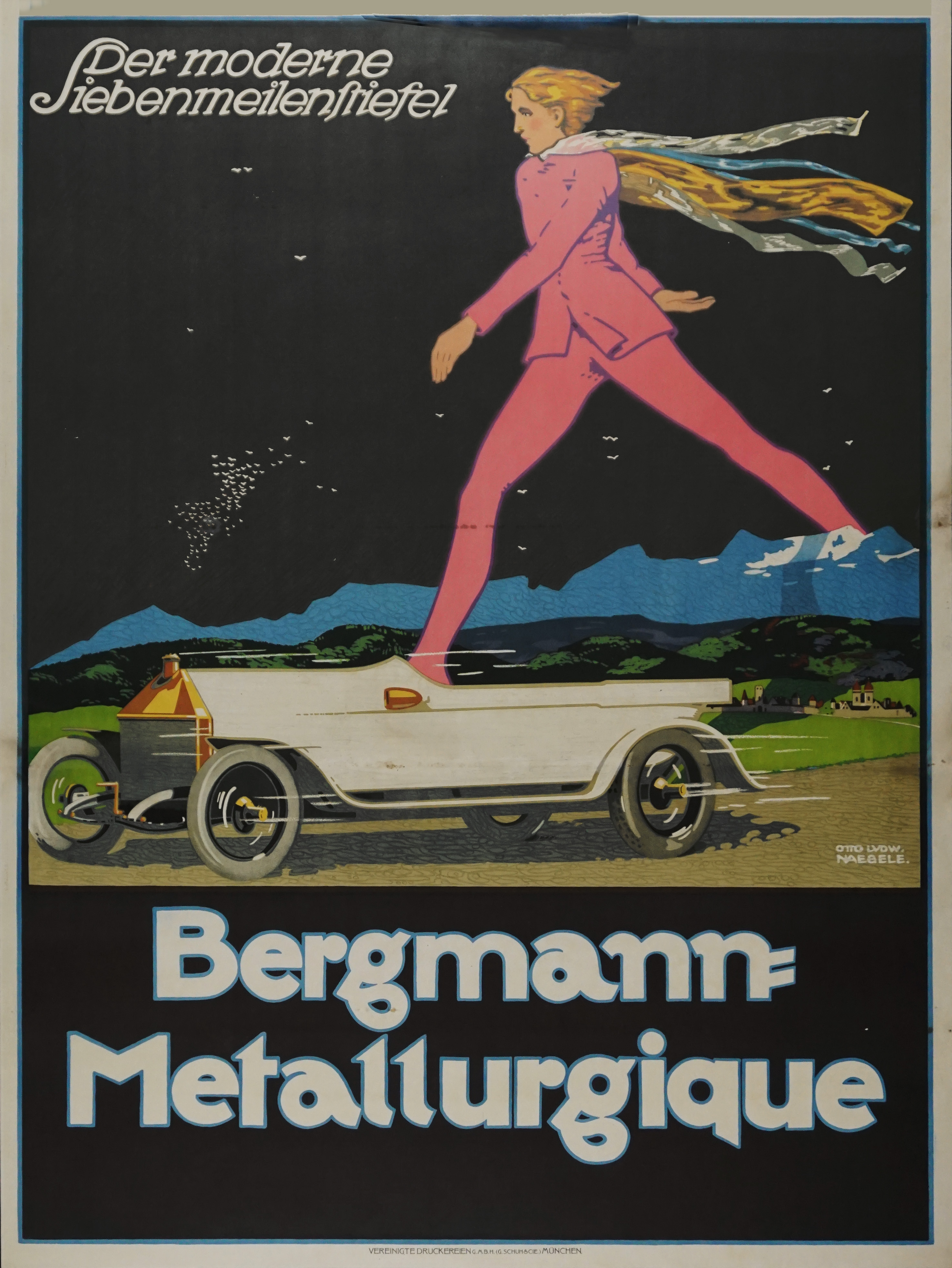
- Industry: Automotive
- Founded: 1909; 117 years ago
- Founder: Leonhard Ludwig Sigmund Bergmann
- Defunct: 1922; 104 years ago
- Headquarters: Berlin, Germany
- Products: Cars

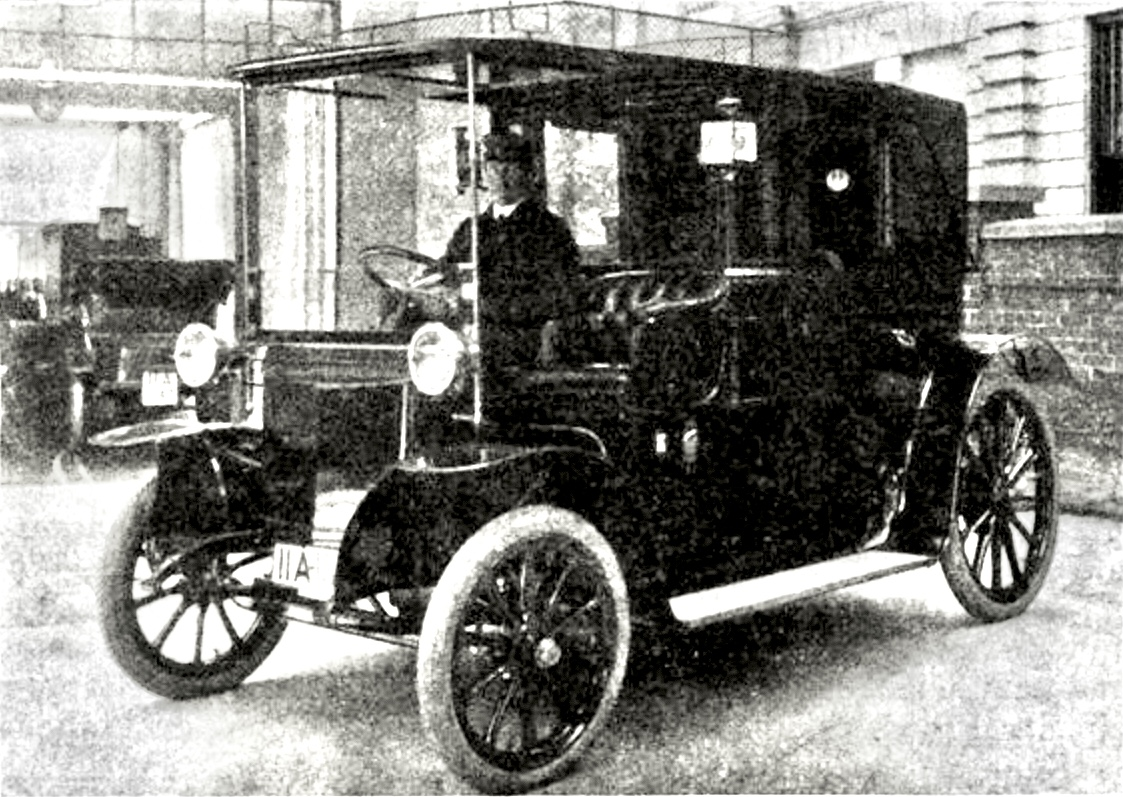
Bergmann-Metallurgique Fulgura electric Limousine (1910)

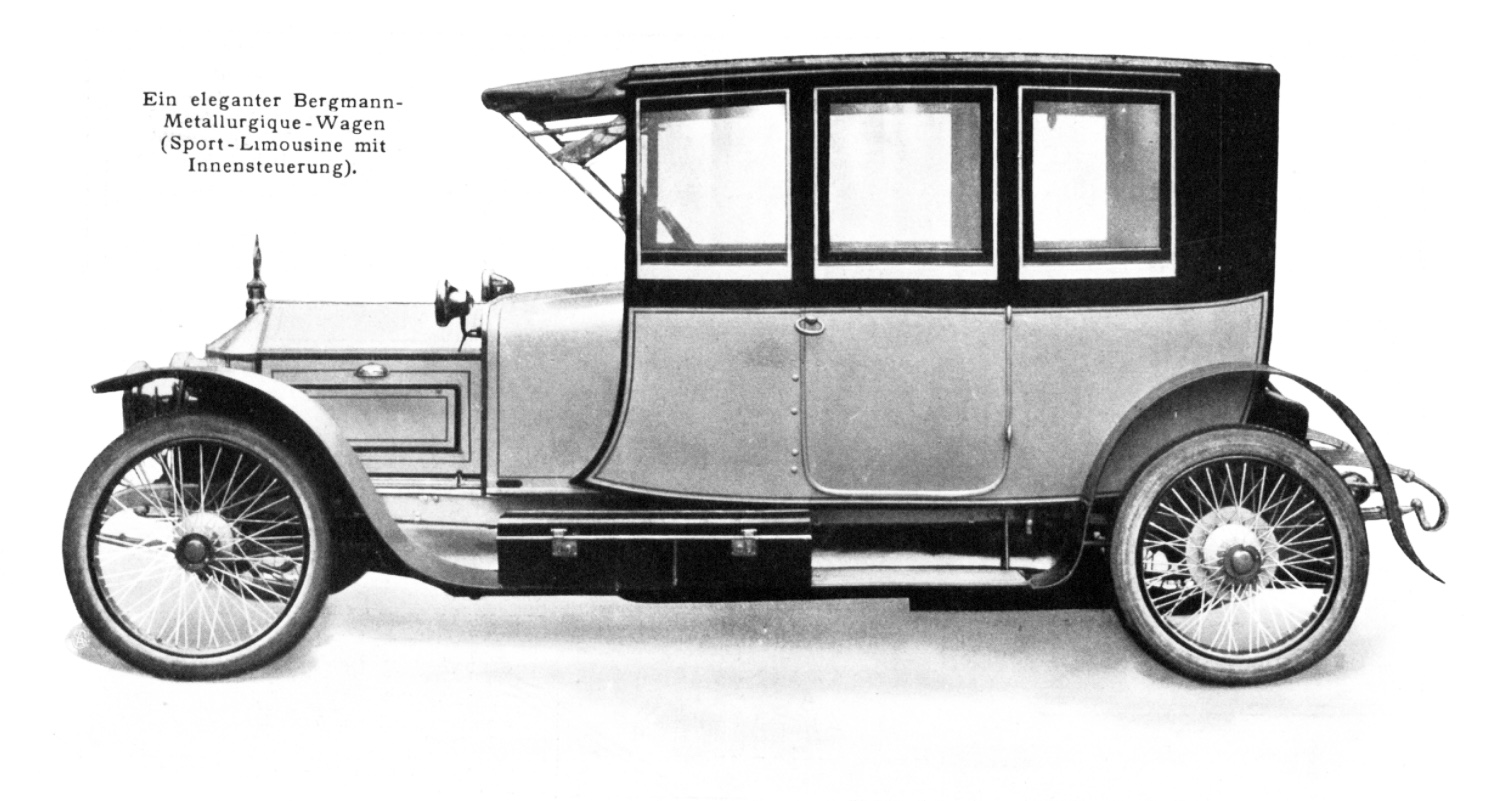
Bergmann-Metallurgique (1911)

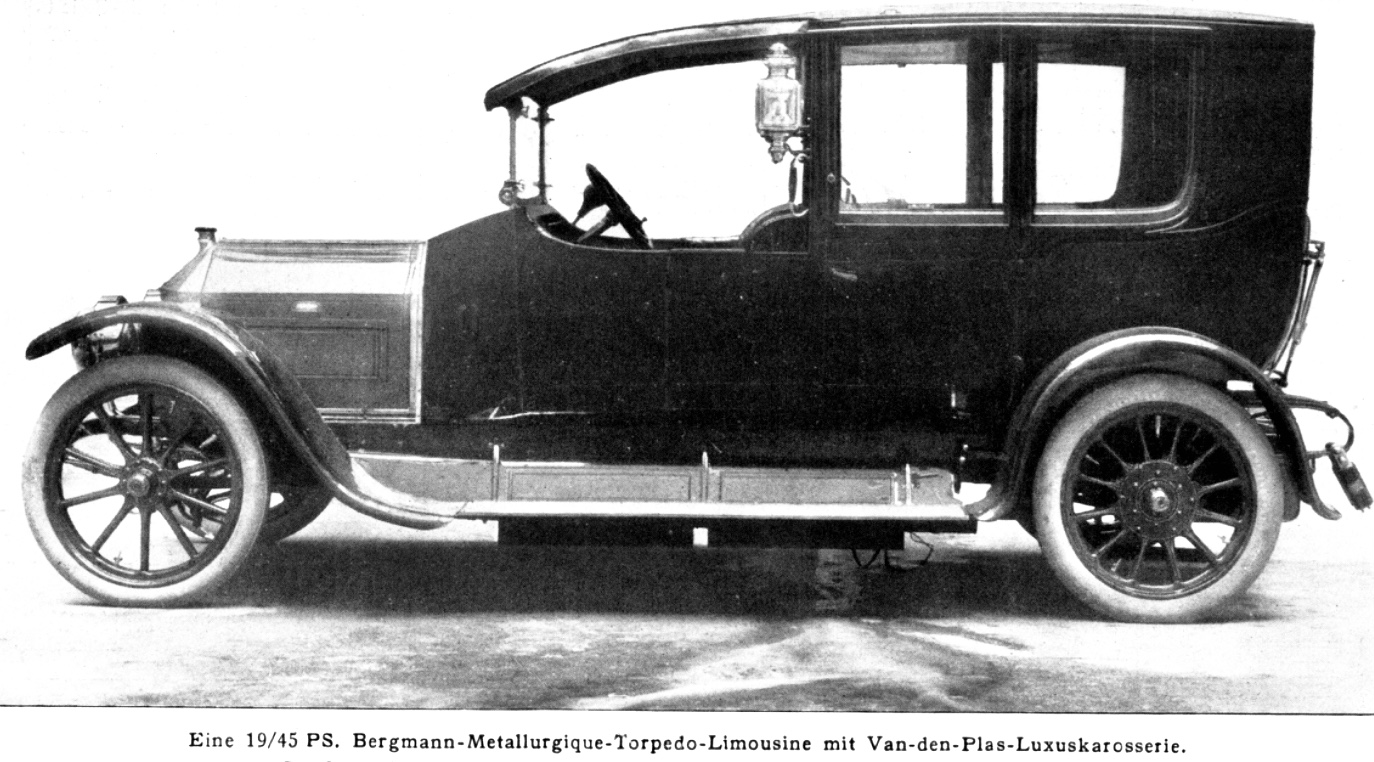
Bergmann-Metallurgique 19-45 (1911)

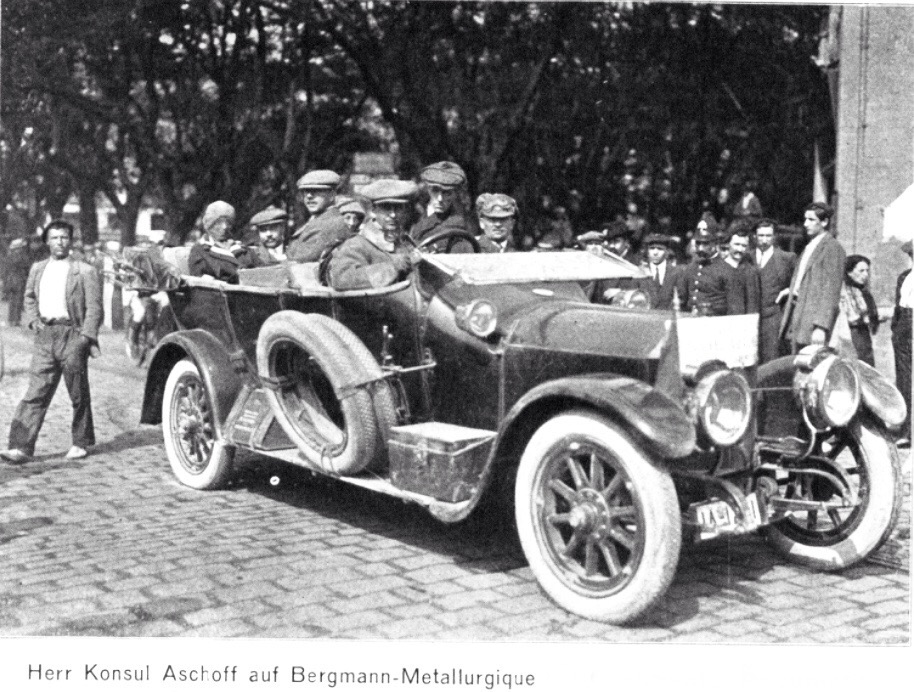
Bergmann-Metallurgique (1912)

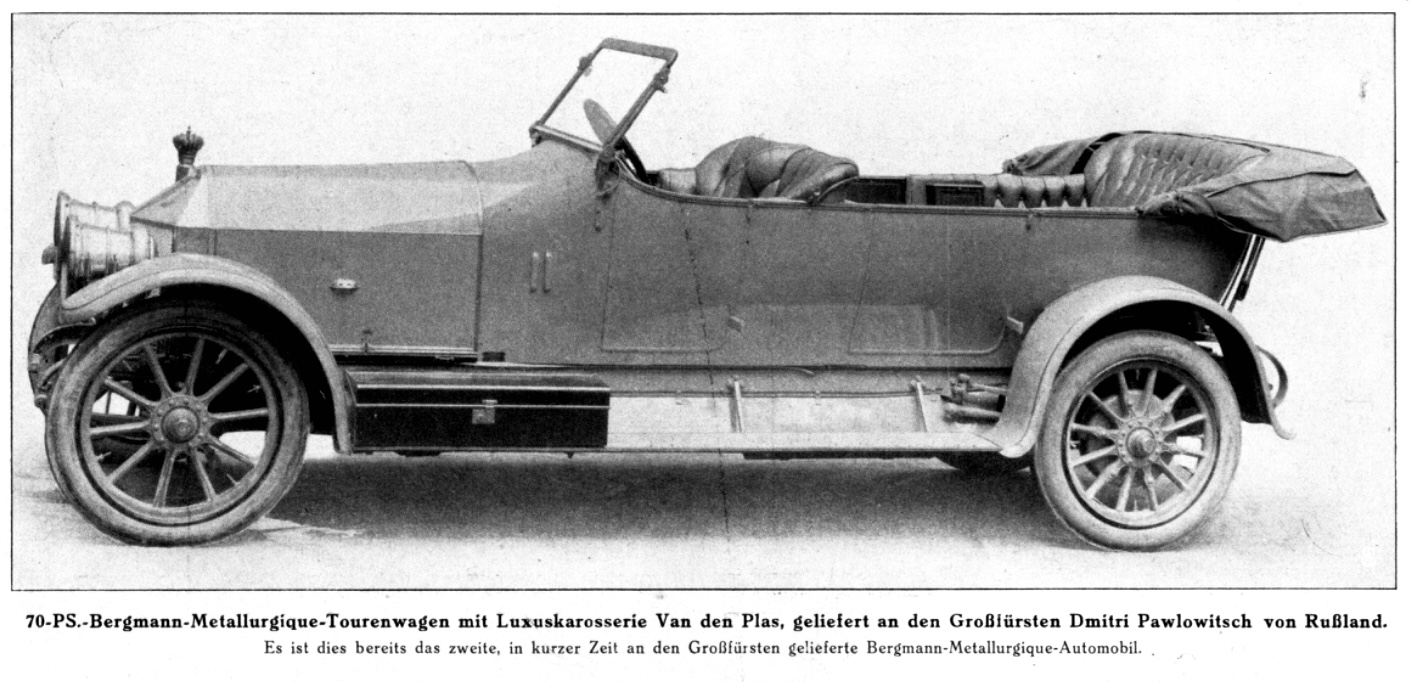
Bergmann-Metallurgique 29-70 hp (1912–1913) Grand Duke Dmitri Pavlovich of Russia owned this car

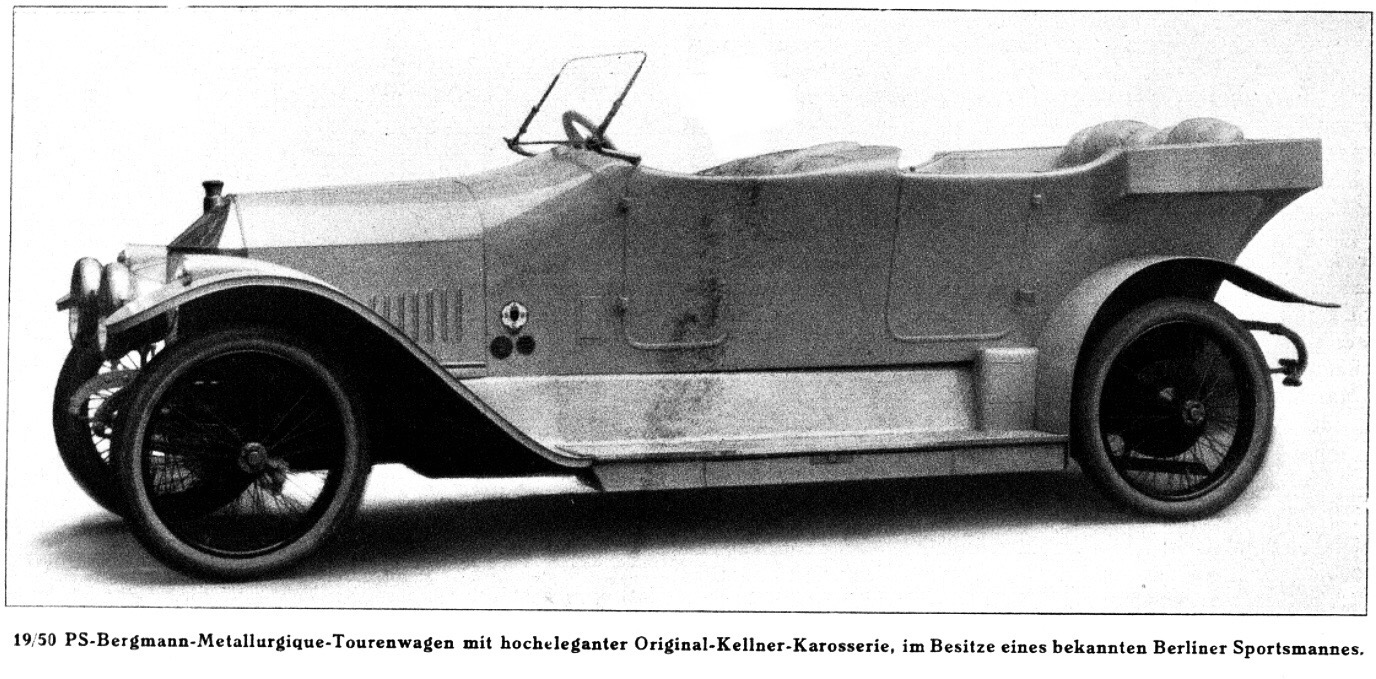
Bergmann-Metallurgique 19-50 (1913)

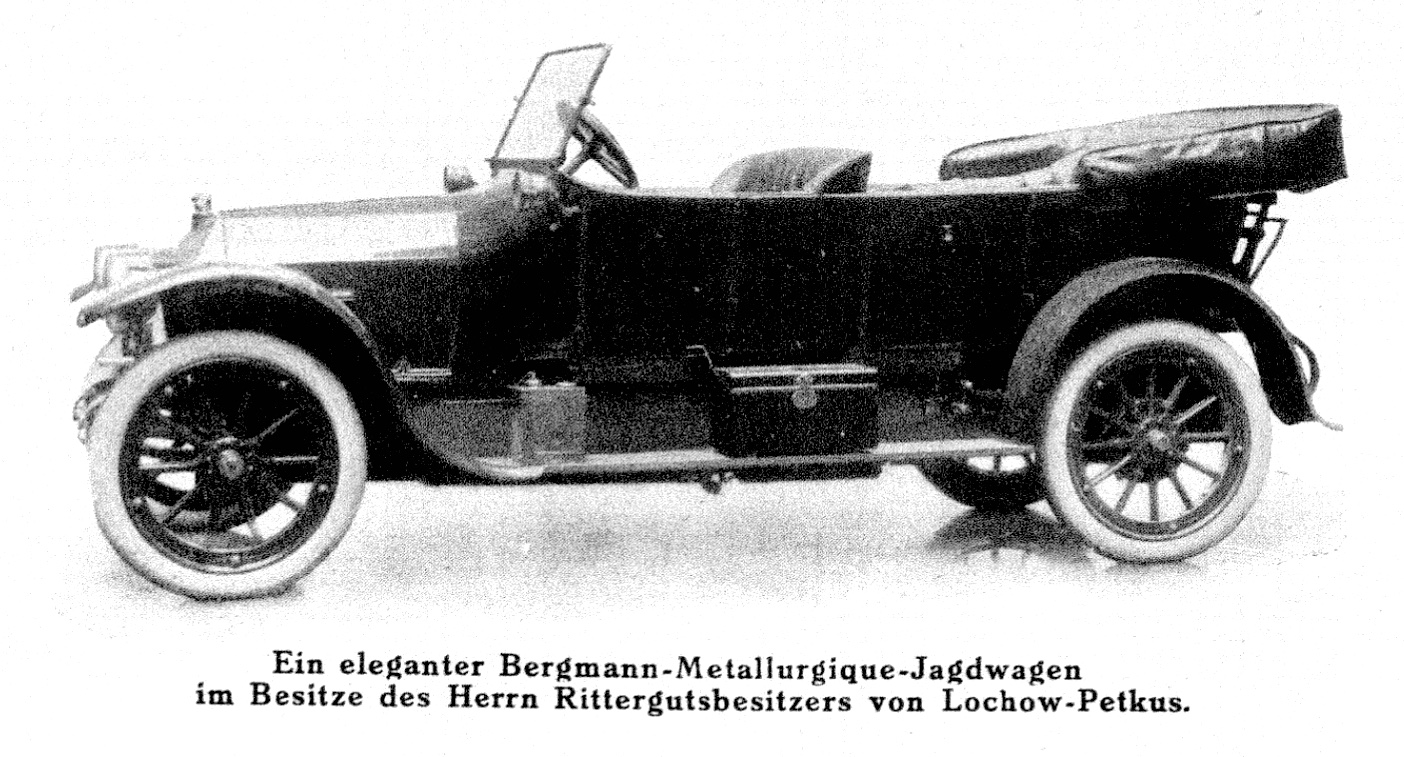
Bergmann-Metallurgique (1913–1914)

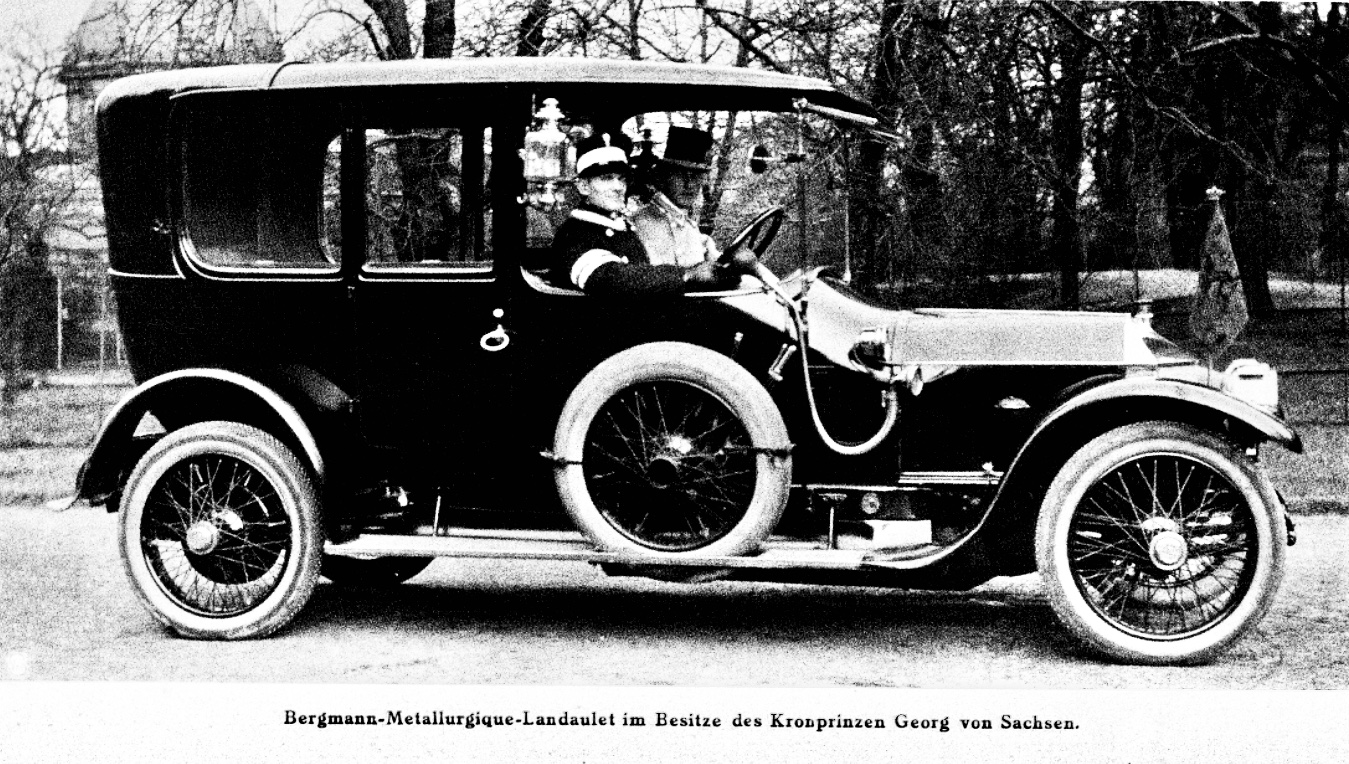
Bergmann-Metallurgique Landaulet (1913–1914) Georg, Crown Prince of Saxony in his car

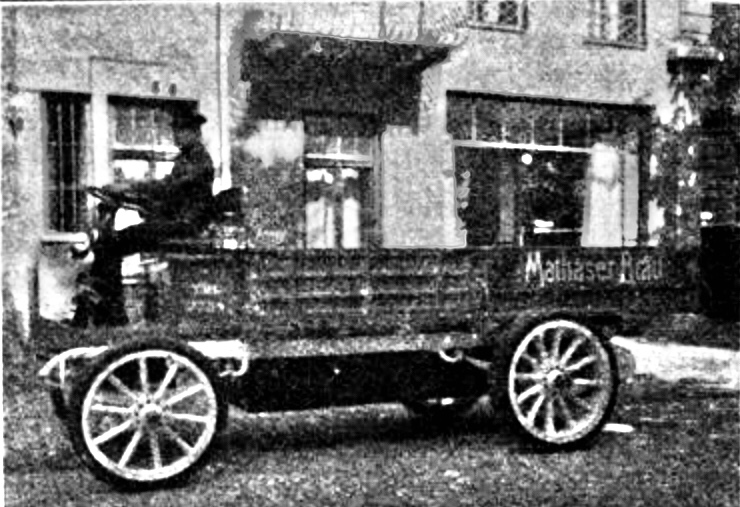
Bergmann-Metallurgique Fulgura electric truck T 2000 (1910) unfortunately very poor image quality

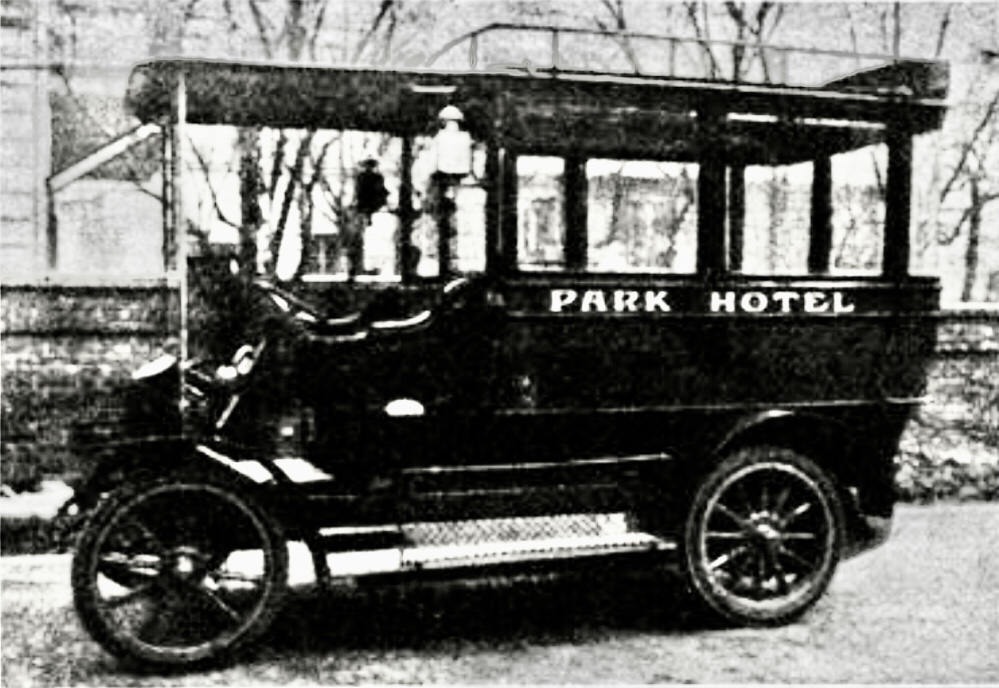
Bergmann-Metallurgique Fulgura electric Omnibus (1910) unfortunately poor image quality

The Bergmann-Metallurgique in Berlin was a German company that produced cars and trucks from 1907 to 1922.

== Company founder ==
The founder of Bergmann-Metallurgique was Leonhard Ludwig Sigmund Bergmann, who was born in 1851 in Bad Tennstedt, Saxony. After its cession to Prussia, Tennstedt belonged to the Langensalza district in the province of Saxony. Today, Bad Tennstedt is a rural town in the Unstrut-Hainich district in northern Thuringia. He completed an apprenticeship as a toolmaker and as a mechanical engineer. In 1869, he emigrated to America and was fortunate enough to meet the inventor Thomas Alva Edison. Edison offered him a job in his laboratories in Newark. Here he met the German Sigmund Schuckert, who, together with Werner Siemens, founded the Siemens-Schuckert Works. In 1876, Bergmann became self-employed and founded a business for bell systems, mainly for hotels. In 1880, he was involved in the construction of the first power plant for New York City, as well as a power plant in Milan, Italy. He then founded Bergmann Elektro und Dynamowerke AG in 1897. At the end of 1899, Bergmann returned to Germany and founded Bergmann Elektrizitätswerke AG in Berlin. In 1901, he entered the automobile business. His first vehicle appeared in 1907.

== Company history ==
The subsidiary of Bergmann Elektrizitätswerke named Bergmann-Metallurgique was not founded until 1909. Vehicles from the Belgian company Métallurgique had been sold by him since 1901, and with the license acquired in 1909, vehicles could now be produced directly in Berlin. Electric vehicles from Bergmann ran under the brand name Fulgura. All the vehicles, equipped with batteries from the German Edison Accumulator Company GmbH, had ranges of 14 km to 100 km depending on the vehicle size and load. However, the electric vehicles from Bergmann-Metallurgique could not really establish themselves.

== Technical data ==
Year	Model	Bore (mm)	Stroke (mm)	Displacement (cc)
1907	60/80	150	140	9896
1908				
1909	8/16	75	110	1944
1910	8/16	75	110	1944
	Prinz-Heinrich	105	165	5715
1911	8/16	75	110	1944
	6/14	72	96	1563
	19/45			
1912	6/14	72	96	1563
1913	6/18	72	96	1563
	9/28			
	10/30	80	130	2614
	12/35	84	140	3103
	14/40	90	140	3563
	19/50			
1914	6/18	72	96	1563
	14/40	90	140	3563
1915				
1916				
1917				
1918				
1919				
1920				
1921				
1922				
