= Samuels-Smith =

Samuels-Smith is a surname. Notable people with the surname include:

- Jason Samuels Smith (born 1980), American tap dancer, choreographer, and director
- Odin Samuels-Smith (born 2006), Jamaican footballer
- Ishé Samuels-Smith (born 2006), English footballer

== See also ==
- Samuel Smith (disambiguation)
