= Samuel Smith (watchmaker) =

American engineer and businessman

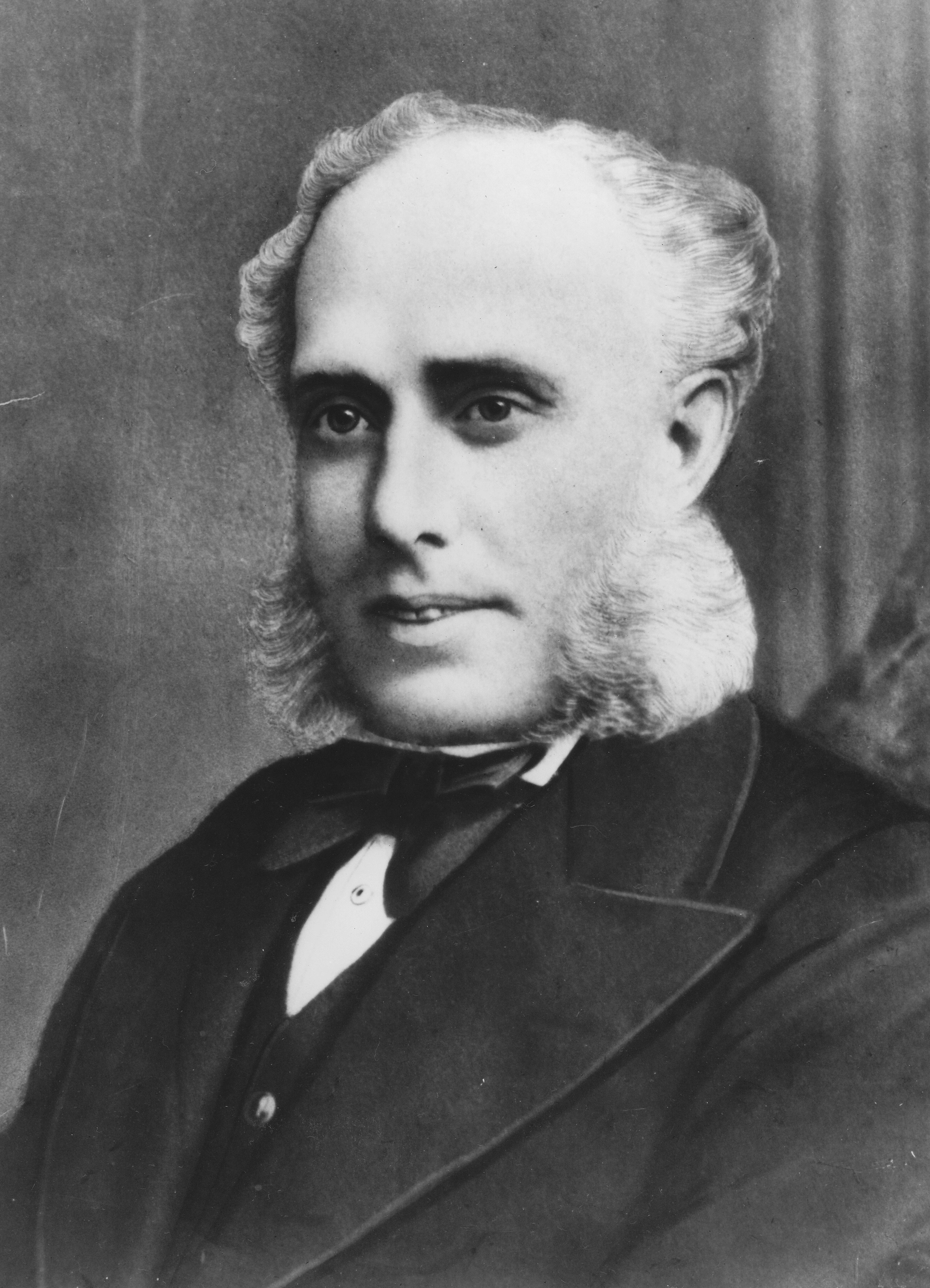
Samuel Smith

Samuel Smith (1826–1875) was the founder of Smiths Group, one of the United Kingdom's largest engineering businesses.

== Career ==
Trained as a craftsman, Samuel Smith opened his first shop in Newington Causeway, in London, in 1851. His business expanded rapidly, as he gained a reputation for offering a fast and friendly service. This enabled him to open a second shop in 1871. He had a son, also named Samuel, who developed the business to manufacture clocks and dials for automobiles. Samuel Smith Snr. died in 1875.
