= Samuel Smith Jr. =

American politician

Member of the Indiana Senate from the 2nd district
- In office August 24, 1998 – November 5, 2008
- Preceded by: Lonnie Randolph
- Succeeded by: Lonnie Randolph

Personal details
- Party: Democratic
- Spouse: Diane Taylor-Smith
- Education: Winona State University
- Profession: Business owner

Samuel Smith Jr. is a former Democratic member of the Indiana Senate, representing the 2nd District from 1998 to 2008.
