= Samuel Smith (schoolmaster) =

English priest and educator

Samuel Smith (died 23 March 1808) was an English priest and schoolmaster who became Headmaster of Westminster School in the 18th century.

Smith was educated at Westminster School and Trinity College, Cambridge (admitted 1750, matriculated and scholarship 1751, graduated B.A. 1754, M.A. 1757, LL.D. 1764). He became a Fellow of Trinity in 1756.

Ordained deacon in September 1755 and priest in December 1755, Smith held the following church livings:

- Rector of Walpole St Andrew, Norfolk, 1762–1808
- Rector of St Peter's, West Lynn, Norfolk, 1762–1785
- Rector and patron of Dry Drayton, Cambridgeshire, 1785
- Prebendary of Westminster Abbey, 1787–1808
- Prebendary of Peterborough Cathedral, 1787–1808
- Rector of Daventry, Northamptonshire, 1795–1808

He was Headmaster of Westminster School 1764–1788.

He married firstly Anna Jackson, secondly Susannah Pettingall, and thirdly Ann Pinckney. His eldest son Samuel Smith became Dean of Christ Church.

Smith died on 23 March 1808, aged 77, and was buried in Westminster Abbey alongside his first two wives and his son Thomas.
