= Samuel Smith (Dean of Christ Church) =

English clergyman and academic administrator

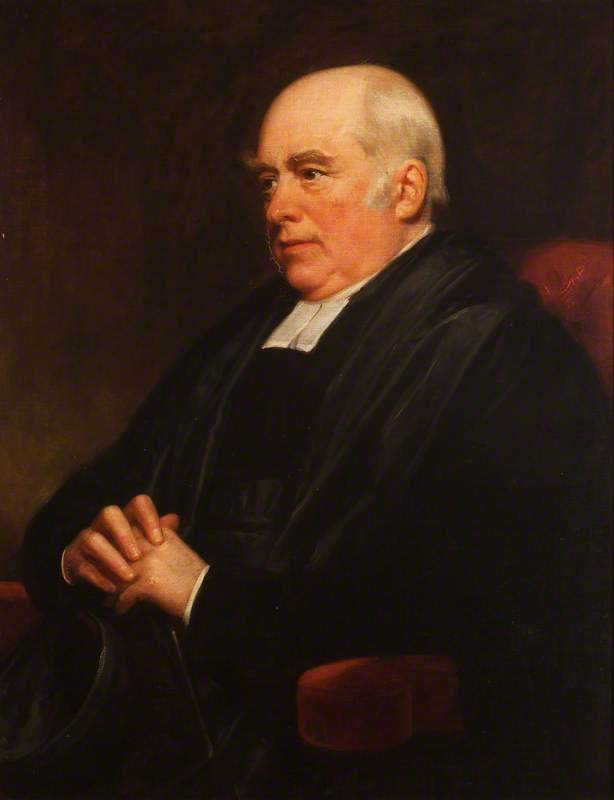
Samuel Smith, Dean of Christ Church

Samuel Smith (20 September 1765, Westminster – 19 January 1841, Oxford) was an English clergyman and academic administrator at the University of Oxford.

== Life ==
The eldest son of Samuel Smith (Headmaster of Westminster School 1764–1788) and his first wife Anna Jackson, Smith was born on 20 September 1765 and baptised in Westminster Abbey on 15 October.

Smith was educated at Westminster School and Christ Church, Oxford, matriculating on 30 May 1782, aged 16, and graduating B.A. 1786, M.A. 1789, B.D. 1797, D.D. 1808.

Smith was ordained a priest in the Church of England in 1790. He held livings at Daventry (1795) and Dry Drayton (1808), prebendaries at Southwell Minster (1800) and York Minster (1801), and became Chaplain to the House of Commons (1802).

At Christ Church, Oxford, Smith was a tutor and Censor (1794), Canon (1807–1824), Sub-Dean (1809), Treasurer (1813), and Dean of Christ Church (1824–1831).

Fergus Butler-Gallie rates Smith as "one of the least successful figures in the history of British academia": his blunders included rusticating student Lord Charles Wellesley, incurring the fury of Wellesley's father the Duke of Wellington; stating that he had hit a fellow rower over the head to prevent him from capsizing a leaking boat; and failing to control the canons, fellows and students, whose disputes regarding Sir Robert Peel's bill for Catholic emancipation descended into violence and vandalism. Smith backed Peel; the anti-Peel faction in response studded the message "No Peel" into a door below the college's Great Hall.

Smith resigned as Dean in 1831, accepting a prebendary at Durham Cathedral.

A daughter married the Rev. Richard Harington, DD, Principal of Brasenose College, Oxford.

Preceded by Charles Henry Hall	Dean of Christ Church, Oxford; 1824–1831	Succeeded by Thomas Gaisford
