= Métallurgique =

Belgian car manufacturer, 1898–1928

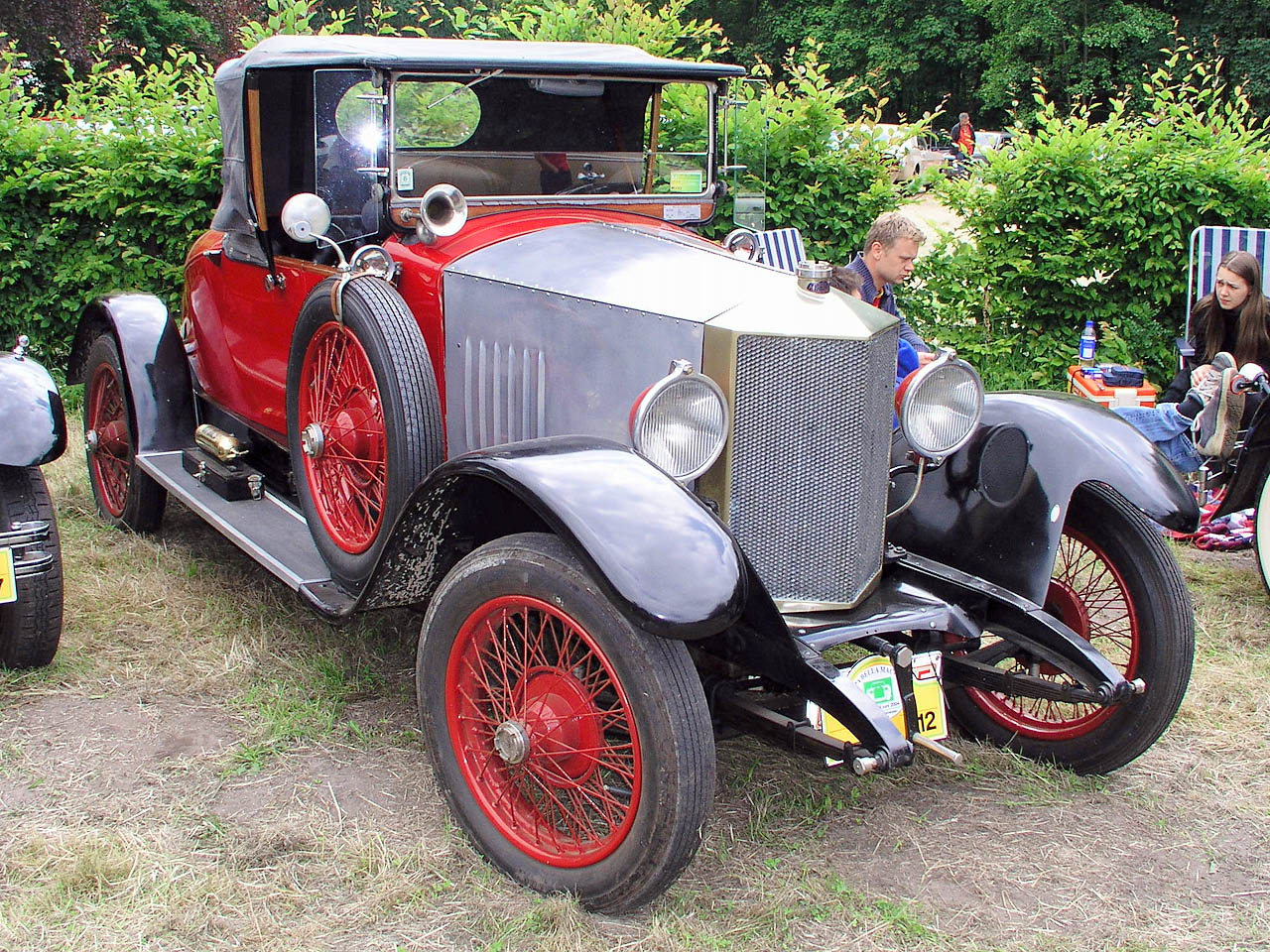
1921 Métallurgique 12-14 HP sports roadster

Métallurgique were cars made by Société Anonyme L'Auto Métallurgique, Marchienne-au-Pont, Belgium, between 1898 and 1928. Before making cars, the company had made railway locomotives and rolling stock.

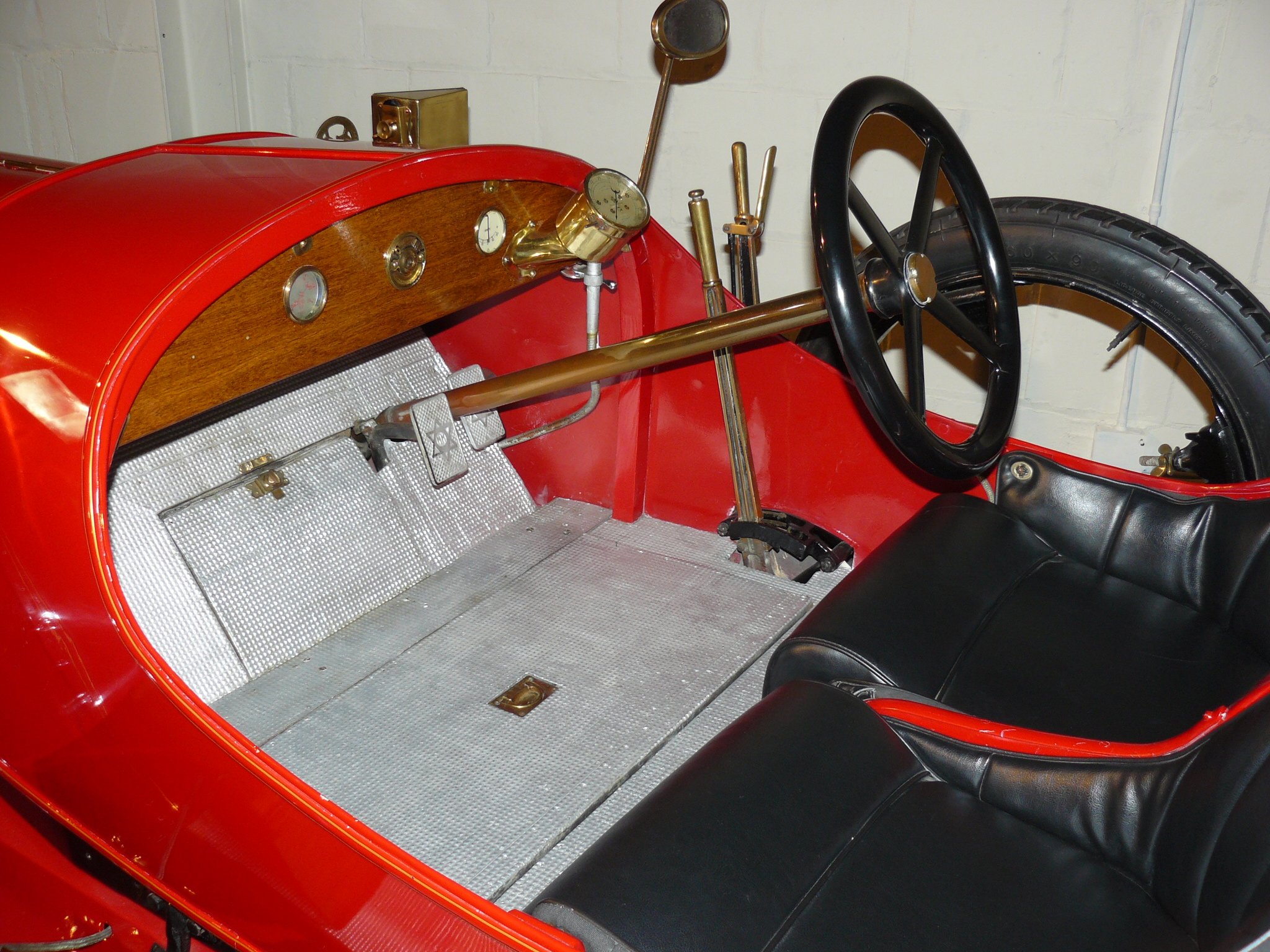
Metallurgique Speedster 1911

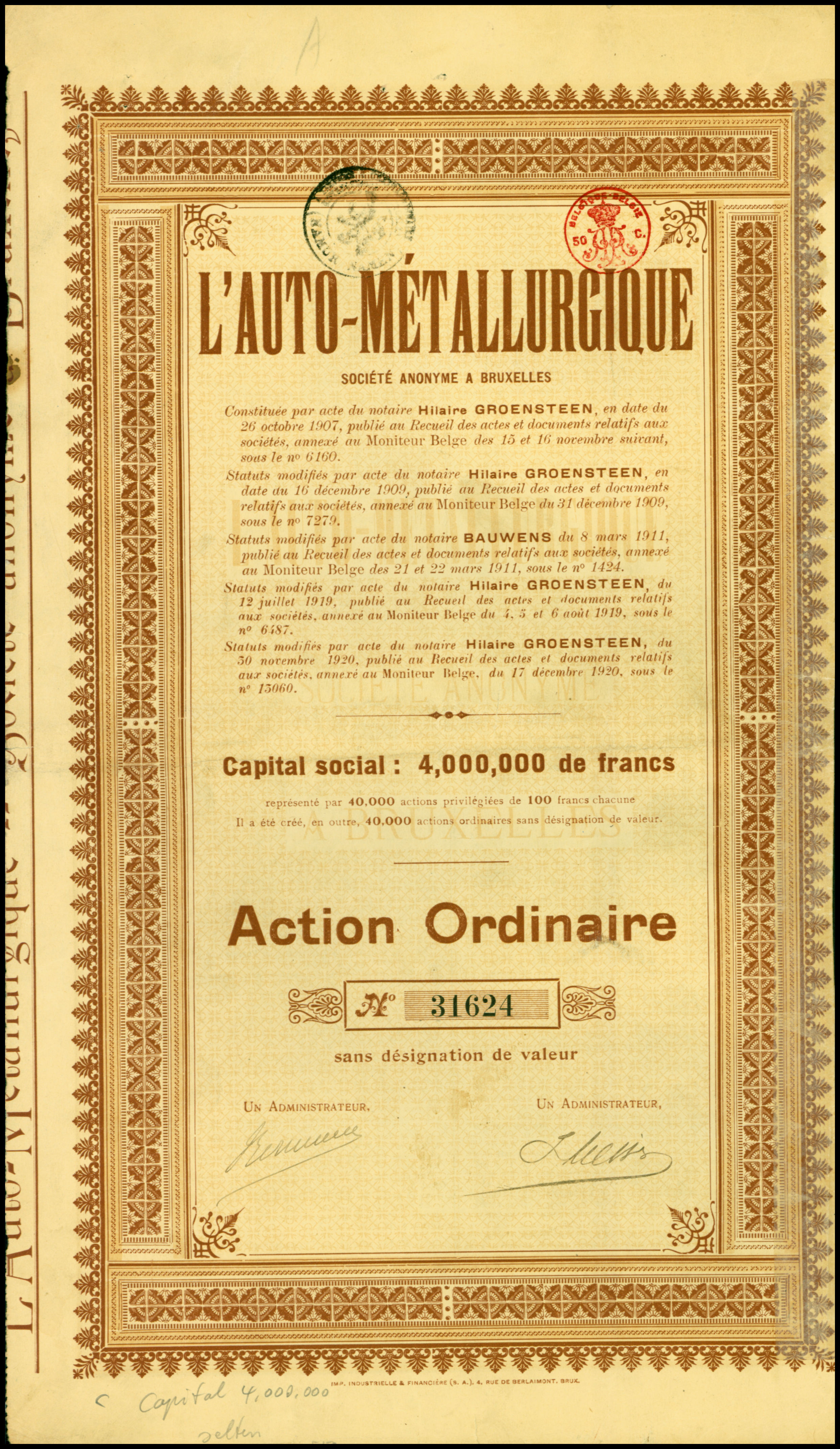
Share of the L'Auto-Métallurgique SA, issued 1920

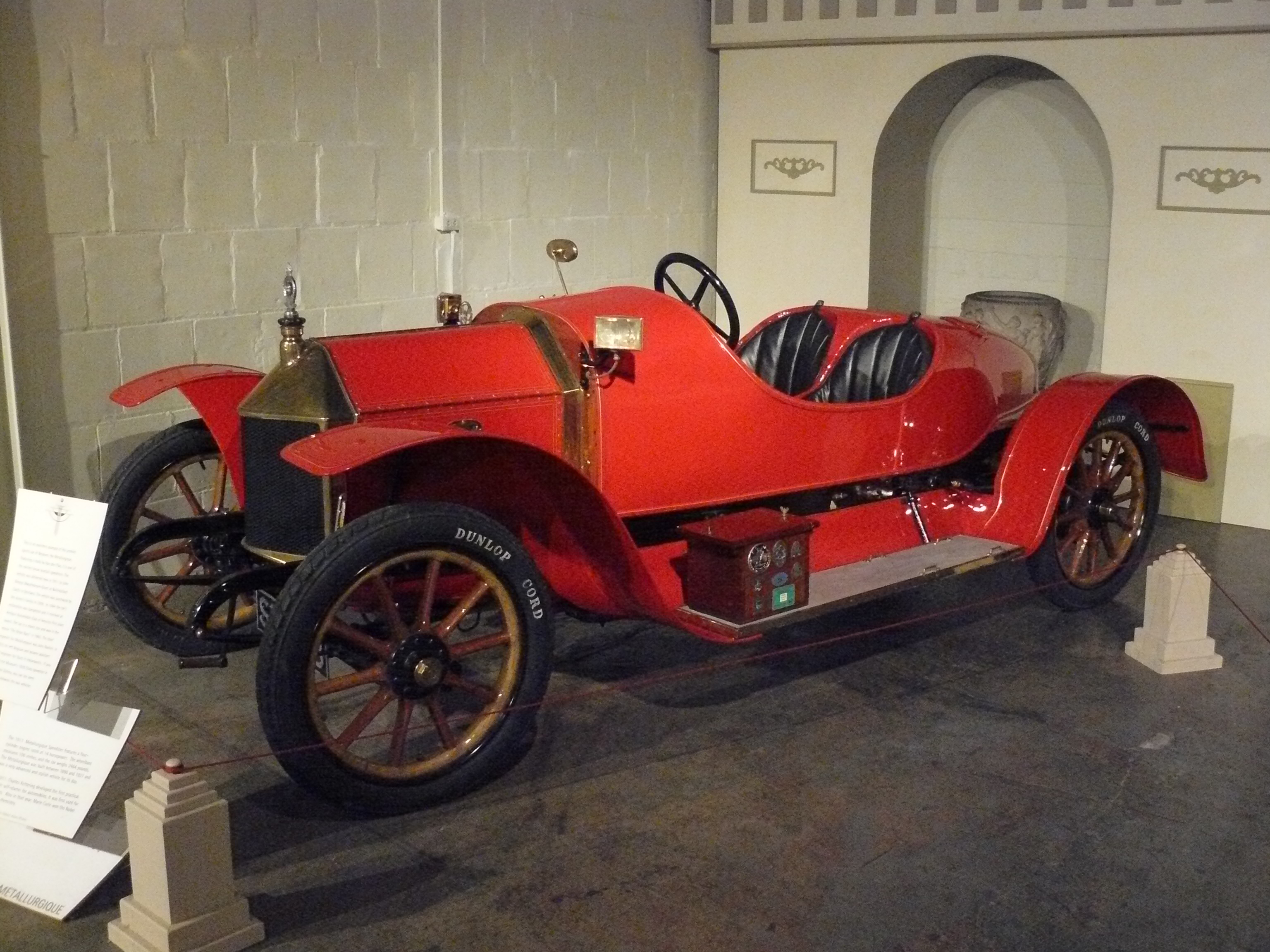
Metallurgique Speedster 1911

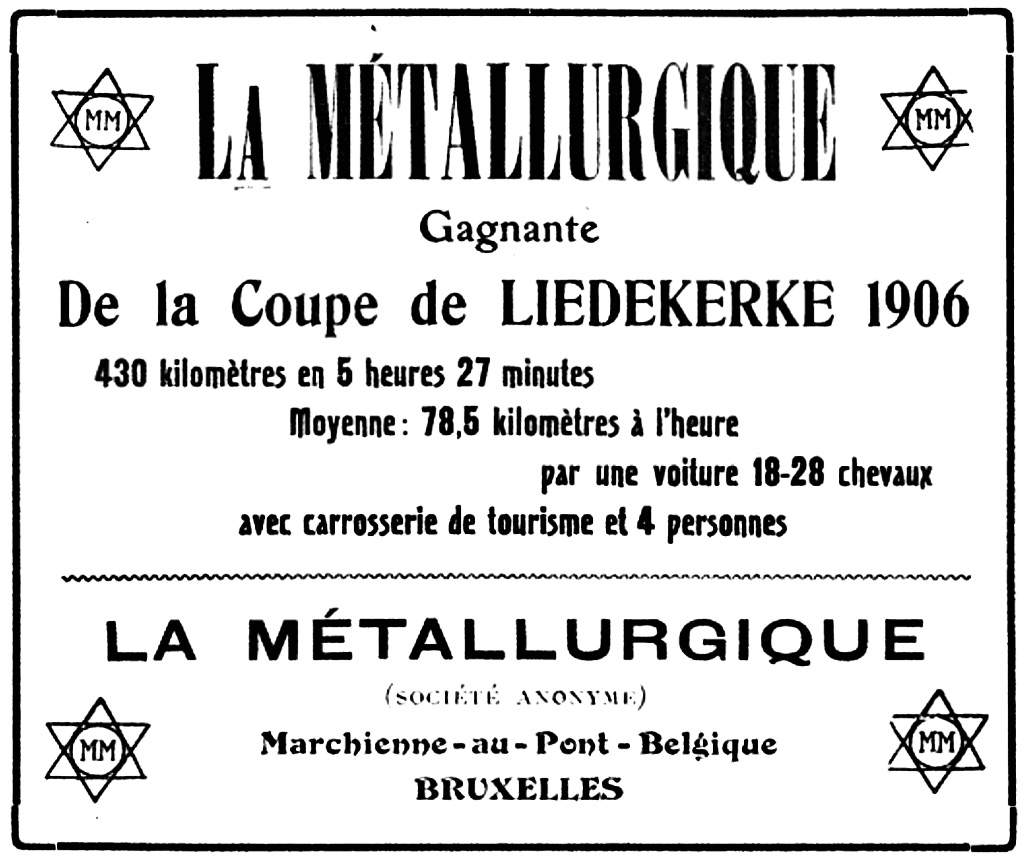
Métallurgique (1907).

== Production ==
The first cars were 4.5 hp (3.4 kW) 2-cylinder models with chain drive. In 1900, the company switched to shaft drive. In 1905 an all-new range was introduced, resembling contemporary Daimlers, both designed by Ernst Lehmann, who come to Métallurgique from there in 1903. These cars, with pressed-steel chassis, live rear axle, shaft drive, high-tension ignition, and the option of dynamo-powered electric lighting, were to establish the company as one of the finest makers of sporting cars in Europe. Production was targeted for export, and most sales were in Britain. In 1906, there came the 4-cylinder inlet over exhaust 10 L (610 cu in), with a claimed output of 100 bhp (75 kW) at 1400 rpm, enabling the car to reach 160 km/h (99 mph). The cars got a distinctive V front radiator in 1907.

For 1908 the car range included the 60/80 and the 40-hp, which was a smaller version of the 60/80, the 2-cylinder cars being finally dropped, the last of them a 12/14. They were replaced in 1909 by a 12/14 four-cylinder (built in Germany by Bergmann Elektrizitäwerke of Berlin), joined by a 5-litre 26 hp (19 kW), and in 1911 all cars got 4-speed gearboxes. Bodywork was made by Vanden Plas. The Bergmann-built cars proved expensive in Britain, thanks to tariffs.

Métallurgique cars were also made from 1909 under licence by Bergmann-Metallurgique in Berlin, Germany who had previously made electric cars. These were sold as Bergmann-Métallurgique.

All prewar cars were of exceptionally high quality.

The company's agent in Britain, Oscar Cupper, also served as "one of the firm's most able" works drivers.

After World War I, car production restarted with the 26/60, the 20/40, and the 15/20. The 26/60 was newly-fitted with Adex brakes at all four corners. a rarity at the time. The first post-war designs arrived in 1921 with the 3-litre.

The 15/20 disappeared in 1922, replaced by a new 12 hp (8.9 kW) tourer with four-wheel brakes, powered by an 1,882 cc (114.8 cu in) overhead-valve four, designed by Paul Bastien. It remained the company's primary product until 1927.

It was in 1927 the company was taken over by Minerva-Impéria, and it ceased to exist.

== Takeover ==
The company was taken over by Impéria in 1927 and the factory was acquired by Minerva. The name was dropped. Paul Bastien joined Stutz in America where he was responsible for the Vertical Eight.

La Societe Anonyme des Automobiles Métallurgique has been set up to bring Métallurgique owners together.

== Sources ==
- Wise, David Burgess, "Métallurgique: The luxury market their forté", in Ward, Ian, executive editor. World of Automobiles Volume 12, pp.1328-9. London: Orbis, 1974.
