= Samantha Smith (disambiguation) =

Samantha Smith (1972–1985) was an American schoolgirl and peace activist.

Samantha Smith may also refer to:

- Samantha Smith (tennis) (born 1971), English tennis player
- Samantha Smith (actress) (born 1969), American actress
- Samantha Smith (gymnast) (born 1992), Canadian trampoline gymnast
- Samantha Quigley Smith (born 1988), American head basketball coach of the SIU Edwardsville Cougars women's basketball team
- Samantha Savage Smith, Canadian singer-songwriter
- Sammy Smith (soccer, born 2001), American soccer player
- Sammy Smith (soccer, born 2005), American soccer player and skier

== See also ==
- Sam Smith (disambiguation)
