= Samuel H. Smith (educator) =

Dr. Samuel H. Smith (born February 4, 1940) was the eighth president of Washington State University, serving for fifteen years (July 1, 1985 – June 8, 2000).

== Early life and education ==
A native of Salinas, California, he holds bachelor's and doctoral degrees in plant pathology from the University of California, Berkeley. He holds four honorary doctoral degrees from Nihon University in Tokyo, Japan, Far Eastern State University in Vladivostok, Russia, Western Governors University in Salt Lake City, and City University in Seattle.

He completed a NATO postdoctoral fellowship with Glasshouse Crops Research Institute in England from 1964-1965 before returning to Berkeley as a faculty member. Smith then spent 16 years with Pennsylvania State University, starting as a faculty member, then becoming department head, and finally, dean of the College of Agriculture and director of the Cooperative Extension Service and Agricultural Experiment Station.

== Legacy at WSU ==
He is remembered for establishing WSU's three regional campuses — WSU Spokane, WSU Tri-Cities and WSU Vancouver — as well as fostering development of the university's Extended Degree Programs (now known as Global Campus). Under his leadership, WSU grew in size and stature. Its teaching, research, and public service activities received worldwide recognition. Strengthening undergraduate and graduate education, placing an international imprint on programs, and increasing opportunities for women and minorities were among his priorities.

Smith led Campaign WSU, the University's first comprehensive fund-raising effort that attracted $275.4 million in private support, substantially over its $250 million goal. The campaign transformed the university’s ability to serve students and the state of Washington by supporting scholarships, faculty recruitment and retention, learning technology and statewide education.

From 1997–99, he served as chair of the executive committee of the National Collegiate Athletic Association, one of a series of leadership positions he held during a major reorganization of NCAA governance. In 2000, Smith chaired the board of directors of the National Association of State Universities and Land-Grant Colleges, the nation's oldest higher education association. He also served on NASULGC’s Kellogg Commission on the Future of the State and Land-Grant Universities.

He concluded his presidency on June 8, 2000.

== Recognition ==
Smith's work in advancing the role of women at WSU was recognized by the introduction of the Samuel H. Smith Leadership Award by the Association for Faculty Women in 2000.

In 2002, the Smith Center for Undergraduate Education (Smith-CUE) was named after the president emeritus. The state-of-the-art building included computer labs, digital technology and internet access available throughout the building, the first of its kind on campus at the time.

Smith was awarded the Weldon B. Gibson Distinguished Volunteer Award in 2016, which is the WSU Foundation's highest honor.

== Work as president emeritus ==
As president emeritus, he established a WSU office location in Downtown Seattle. Smith continued to serve the educational community of Washington through several positions in addition to his work as president emeritus on behalf of WSU. His long-standing interest in online learning led to his appointment to the Sloan/APLU National Commission on Online Learning. Smith has also served on the Washington State Higher Education Coordinating Board, as Talaris Research Institute board chair, and as director and founding board member of the College Success Foundation (CSF), which provides college scholarships and mentoring to low-income, high-potential students. He has been a member of several national commissions dealing with the future of American Universities.

Smith serves as a trustee of the Western Governors University, of which he is a founding member. He and his wife, Patricia, are strong supporters of the WSU Museum of Art, and serve on several boards within the local art community. In addition, Smith was a founding director and board member of the Behind the Badge Foundation.
