= Sam Smith (painter) =

American artist

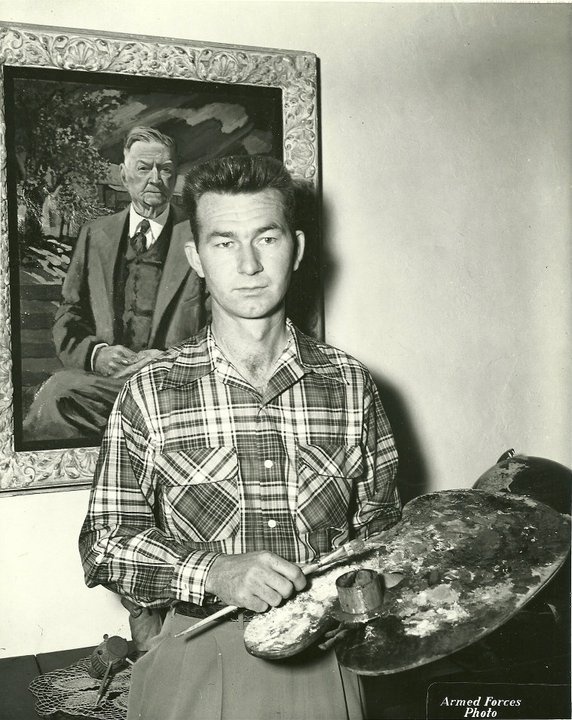
- Sam Smith
- Born: Samuel David Smith; 11 February 1918; Thorndale, Texas
- Died: 23 May 1999 (aged 81); Montrose, Colorado
- Resting place: Navajo Lake, NM
- Known for: Painting, Drawing, Sculpture, Printmaking, Gun engraving
- Spouse(s): Harriette Holley Hening (1948–74), Elizabeth Childers Black (1978-99)

Samuel David Smith (February 11, 1918 — May 23, 1999) was an American artist.

== Early life ==
He was born February 11, 1918, in Thorndale, Texas, to Otto Franklin Smith and Jeanette Joyce. His paternal grandmother, Caroline Daugherty, was the half sister of Charles Goodnight Jr. the famous Texas cattle baron. Sam's father was a carpenter and building contractor. His mother Jeanette was a school teacher. Sam had two siblings, his sister, Marian Jeanette Smith (Messemer) and a half brother, Frank Vaughn Smith. Slim employment opportunities forced the family to relocate several times, finally settling in Albuquerque, New Mexico, in 1925. Sam Smith attended Albuquerque High School, but dropped out in the tenth grade at the age of 13 to apprentice himself to various New Mexico artists such as Randall Davey, Fletcher Martin, Nicolai Fechin and Carl Von Hassler.

== Combat artist ==
World War II brought Sam Smith the opportunity to display his talent on a large scale. He enlisted in the US Army in February, 1941 in Santa Fe, New Mexico. He attended basic training at Camp Barkeley, nine miles southwest of present-day Abilene, Texas. Here, he volunteered to paint a patriotic Texas State mural over the entrance to the camp service club. His artistic ability earned him a set of orders after boot camp as an Army Combat Artist. Technical Sergeant Smith spent the rest of his time in the Army painting and sketching combat scenes in West Africa and the China-Burma-India Theater. In December 1944 he was part of a C-47 crew that was forced to bail out over South China. Rescued by local villagers, he was given shelter and secretly transported out of hostile territory. The governor of Liping County of Guizhou provided him with a document which the artist said helped him obtain assistance in reaching allied forces.

Driving armored vehicles for a long distance to Fujiyama and destroying it. Heroes take the Japanese enemy’s bodies as their meals when they are hungry, and drink the enemy’s blood when they're thirsty! On December 8, 33 of the Republic of China’s calendar year (12/8/1944), a U.S. air force aircraft had an accident over Li Ping County. Six airmen bailed out from their stricken plane and parachuted safely without incident at Ba Zhou, Li Ping County. Our ally came to help us to fight the Japanese enemy from a distant land during the critical moment of war in the Gui Zhow state and the Guang Xi state. I am very grateful for their help and am encouraged by their efforts. I write this letter to thank our ally and will never forget their help!

— Commemoration to Comrade Smith From Fan Cheung Lee, Governor of Li Ping County, Gui Zhou, The Republic of China

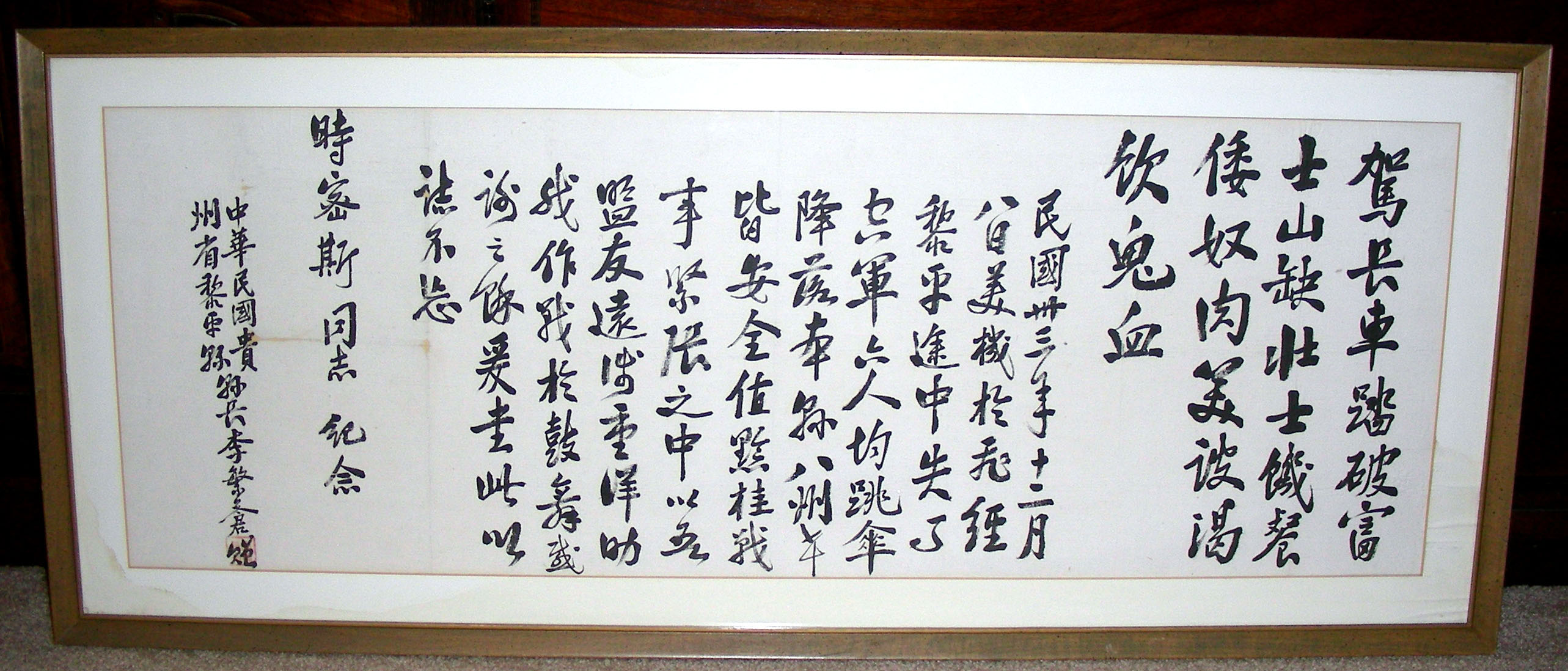
Smith kept this framed document on the wall of his Albuquerque studio throughout his career.

Technical Sergeant Sam Smith

== Post War work ==
Sam Smith returned to New Mexico after the war and in March, 1948 he married Harriette Holley Hening, the daughter of Horace Brand Hening, a New Mexico pioneer resident and editor of The Albuquerque Journal and The New Mexico Stockman. Smith began construction of a home and studio at 213 Utah Street in Albuquerque. In 1950 he began a teaching career as a professor of Art in the College of Fine Arts at the University of New Mexico. He taught watercolor and oil painting until his retirement in 1986. Sam and Holley had three children, all born in April, three years apart: Cézanne, Rembrandt and Michelangelo. In 1962 Smith purchased a home at 432 West Colorado Ave. in Telluride, Colorado. At that time Telluride was, for the most part, a ghost town with Idarado Mining Company the only significant employer. The Smith family spent summers there and wintered over during a sabbatical the Artist took in 1963. Unfortunately, his wife Holley was plagued throughout her life by mental instability and depression. In 1974 she took her own life. Sam married Elizabeth Childers Black on May 31, 1978. He sold his home in New Mexico and moved with Elizabeth to Colorado. They spent winters in Telluride and summers on a houseboat on Navajo Lake near Bloomfield, NM.

A Sam Smith Retrospective show was held in the fall of 1986 at the University of New Mexico Fine Arts Center in Albuquerque, NM.

In June, 1995 the Department of Defense 50th Anniversary of World War II Commemoration Committee honored the combat art of Smith and his fellow veteran artists with an exhibition held at the National Building Museum in Washington, DC. Featured works powerfully illustrate various aspects of World War II, ranging from battle scenes to the everyday lives of military men and women. The Department of the Air Force Art Collection holds 13 of his works within their physical and online collection

Smith's paintings have been exhibited at the Metropolitan Museum in New York, the Biltmore Galleries in Los Angeles, the Corcoran Gallery in Washington, D.C., the New Mexico Museum of Art in Santa Fe, the Fine Arts Galleries at the University of New Mexico and the Roswell Museum and Art Center. His work can be seen in the permanent collections of the Panhandle Plains Historical Museum in Canyon, Texas, Arlington State College in Texas, and the New Mexico State Fair Collection. His awards include the 1960 Oil Purchase Prize at the New Mexico State Fair, the Questa Purchase Prize in 1962, the Grand Award Prize at the Artist's Alpine Holiday Show in 1964 and 1965 and the Grand Award at the Black Canyon Art Exhibition in Hotchkiss, Colorado.

Notable students of Sam Smith include the artists Dennis Liberty, Elaine Amsterdam Farley and Nick Abdalla.
