= Sammy Smith (soccer, born 2005) =

American soccer player and skier (born 2005)

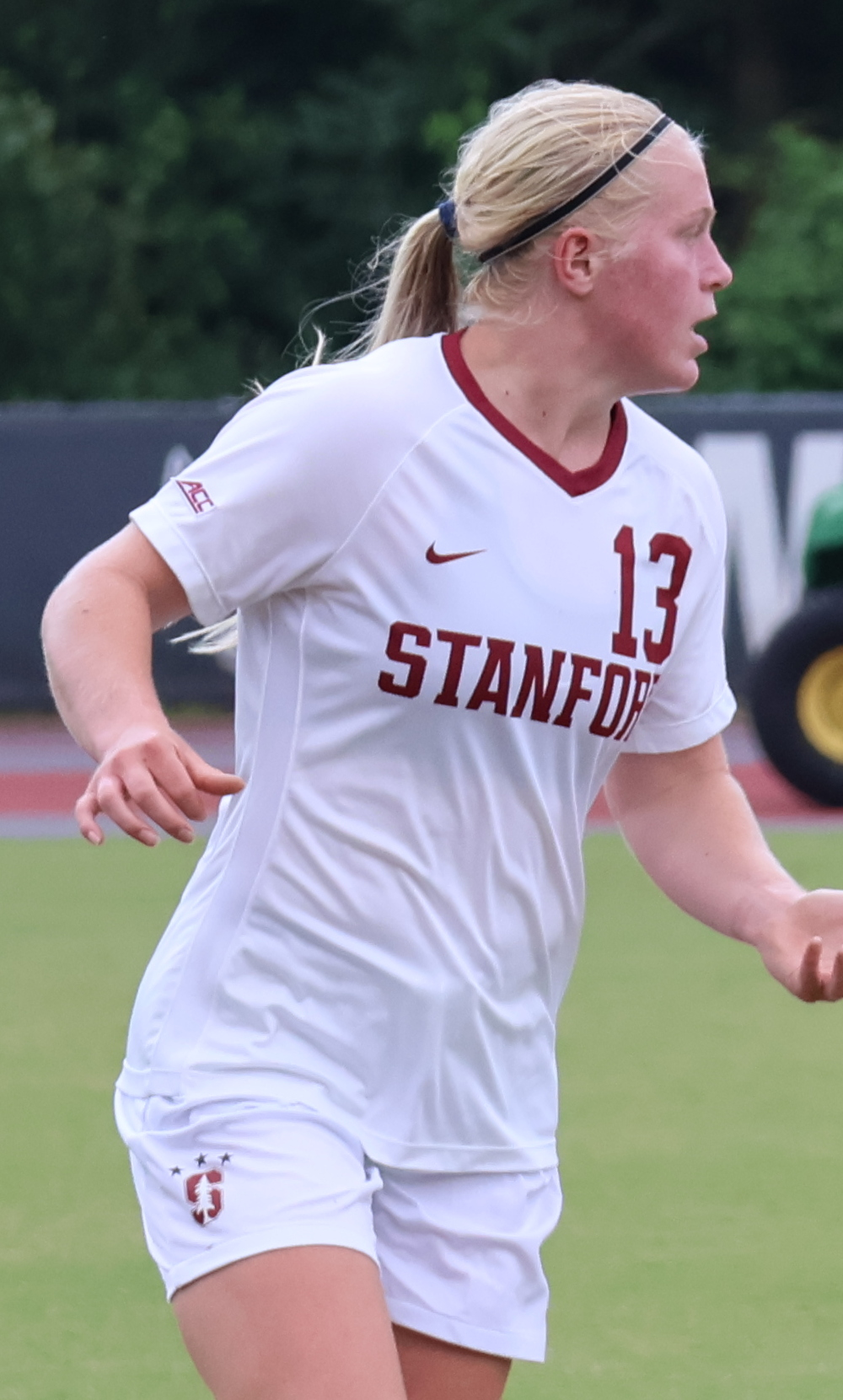
- Smith with Stanford in 2024

Personal information
- Full name: Samantha Elizabeth Smith
- Date of birth: September 22, 2005 (age 21)
- Place of birth: Idaho, United States
- Height: 5 ft 6 in (1.68 m)
- Positions: Defender; forward

Team information
- Current team: Stanford Cardinal
- Number: 13

College career
Years	Team	Apps	(Gls)
2024–	Stanford Cardinal	38	(1)

International career^{‡}
2022	United States U-17	2	(2)
2023–2024	United States U-19	6	(0)
- ‡ National team caps and goals as of June 3, 2024

Samantha Elizabeth Smith (born September 22, 2005) is an American college soccer player for the Stanford Cardinal and cross-country skier for the United States Ski Team. She represented the United States in cross-country skiing at the 2026 Winter Olympics.

She represented the United States youth national team at the 2022 FIFA U-17 Women's World Cup and won bronze at the 2023 Pan American Games.

== Early life ==
Raised in Boise, Idaho, Smith participated and excelled in numerous sports growing up: Nordic, freestyle, and cross-country skiing, soccer, cross-country running, track and field, football, ice hockey, and swimming. She was homeschooled for much of her childhood. She played football during middle school as a tailback, cornerback, kicker, and punter. In her freshman year at Boise High School, she won the IHSAA 5A state cross-country running titles in the 5,000 meters and team events as well as state track titles in the 1,600 meters, 3,200 meters, 4 × 400 meter relay, 4 × 800 meter relay, and team events. For her achievements, she was named the Idaho Gatorade Player of the Year in both sports in 2021. She placed second in cross-country running the following year on a broken leg and seventh the next year having just returned from the 2022 FIFA U-17 Women's World Cup in India.

Smith scored 27 goals for the Boise soccer team between her junior and senior years and was named the Idaho Gatorade Player of the Year both years (2023, 2024). The team won the state championship and finished runners-up respectively, though Smith missed the playoffs both years while on duty with the youth national team. She played ECNL club soccer for the Boise Timber Thorns. She committed to play college soccer for the Stanford during her junior year.

== Soccer career ==
=== College soccer ===
Smith played in 13 games as a substitute for her Stanford Cardinal as a freshman in 2024, helping the team to the NCAA tournament semifinals. She played in all 25 games, starting 14, and scored 1 goal as a sophomore in 2025. She helped the Cardinal win their first Atlantic Coast Conference (ACC) regular-season and tournament titles and reach the final of the NCAA tournament, losing to Florida State.

=== International soccer ===
Smith was called into training camp with the United States under-15 team in 2020. She was an alternate for the under-17 team at the 2022 CONCACAF Women's U-17 Championship before making the roster at the 2022 FIFA U-17 Women's World Cup. She made her international debut in the third group stage game at the World Cup, scoring twice as the United States won 4–0 against Morocco. She was an unused substitute in the quarterfinal match where the team fell to Nigeria on penalties.

Smith played for the under-19 team at the 2023 Pan American Games, where they faced other countries' senior sides. She appeared in all five games and helped the team finish in third place.

=== Honors ===
Stanford Cardinal

- Atlantic Coast Conference: 2025
- ACC tournament: 2025

United States U-19

- Pan American Games bronze medal: 2023

== Skiing career ==
Smith followed her sister into skiing when she was five. She spent winters in Sun Valley, Idaho, growing up. She preferred freestyle skiing before she broke her leg and switched to Nordic skiing in 2021.

Smith was first named to the United States Ski Team for cross-country skiing in 2022. She made her World Cup debut in Norway in March 2023. She won silver in the freestyle sprint at the 2024 Nordic Junior World Ski Championships, the best ever result for an American in the event.

Smith was promoted to the US Ski A Team in 2024, becoming one of the youngest skiers to make the top team at 18 years old. She represented the United States in cross-country skiing at the 2026 Winter Olympics in Milano Cortina.

== Personal life ==
Smith's father, Stephen, is a radiation oncologist who played college soccer at Duke. Her mother, Kristin, is a lawyer who rowed crew and swam at Stanford. She has an older sister, Logan, who played soccer with her at Stanford, and a younger brother, Tucker.

== Cross-country skiing results ==
All results are sourced from the International Ski Federation (FIS).

=== Olympic Games ===
Year	Age	Individual	Skiathlon	Mass start	Sprint	Relay	Team sprint
2026	20	—	—	—	19	—	—
