= Automotive industry in Brazil =

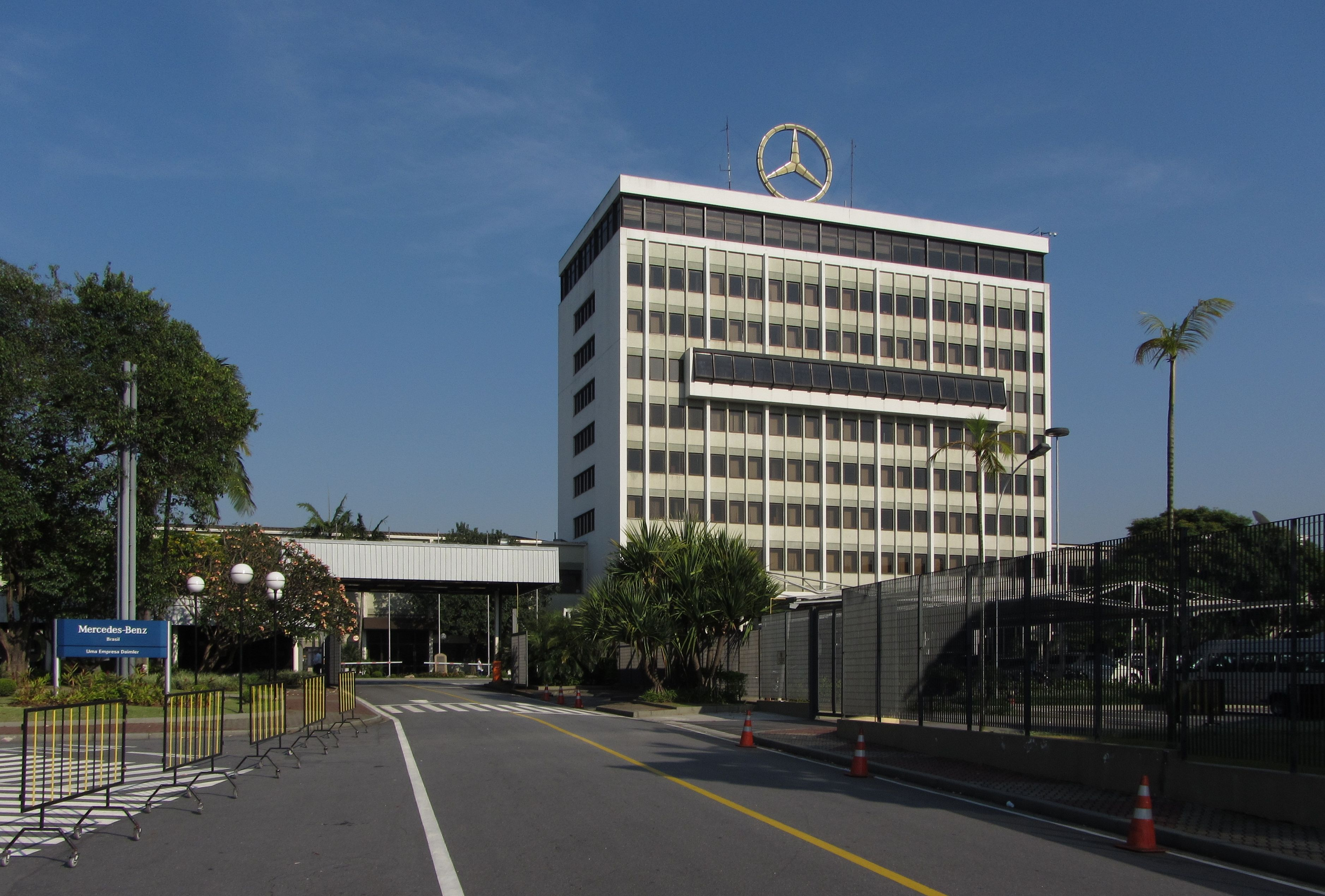
Mercedes-Benz factory in the metro area of São Paulo

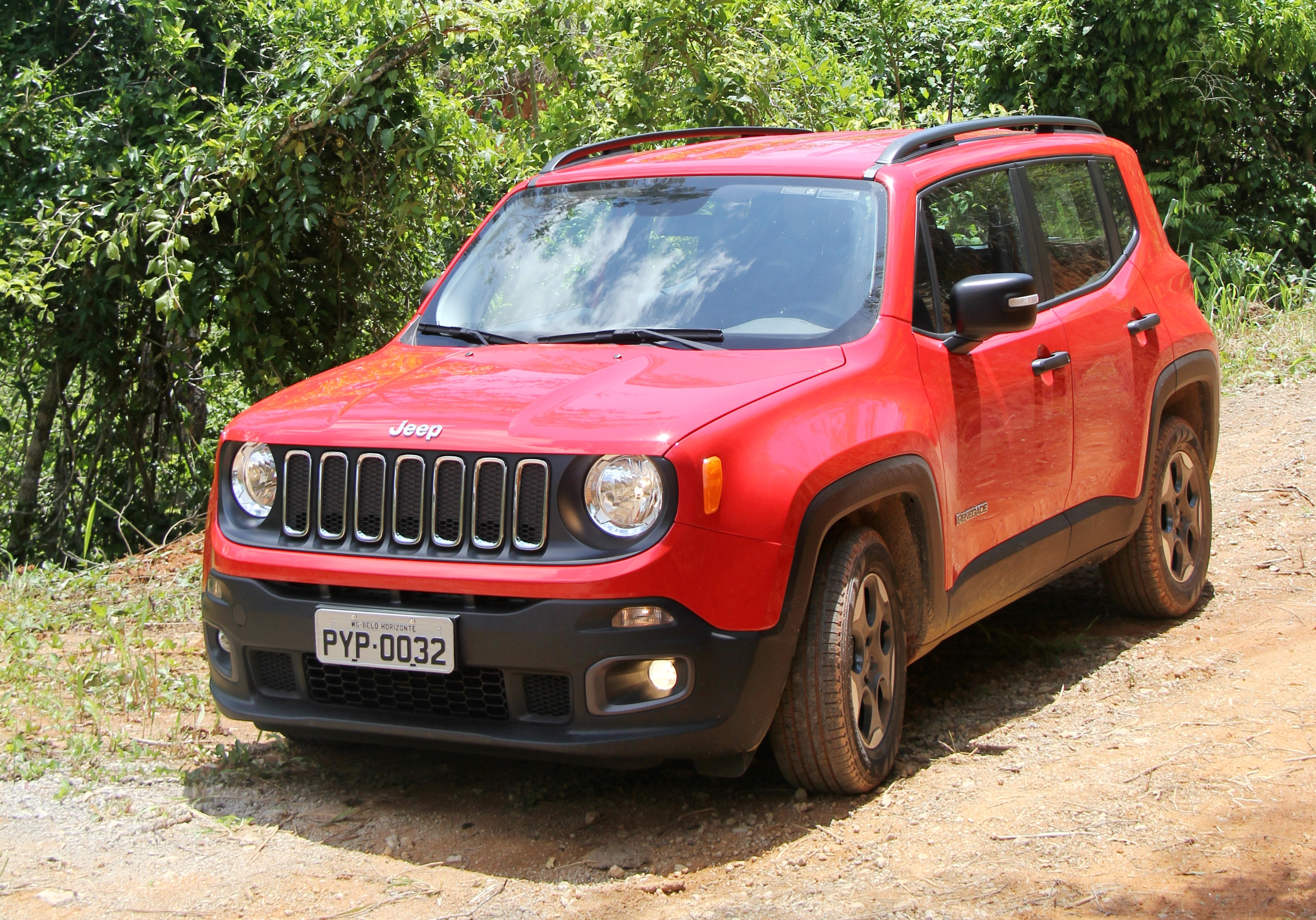
Jeep Renegade made in Brazil, in the metro area of Recife

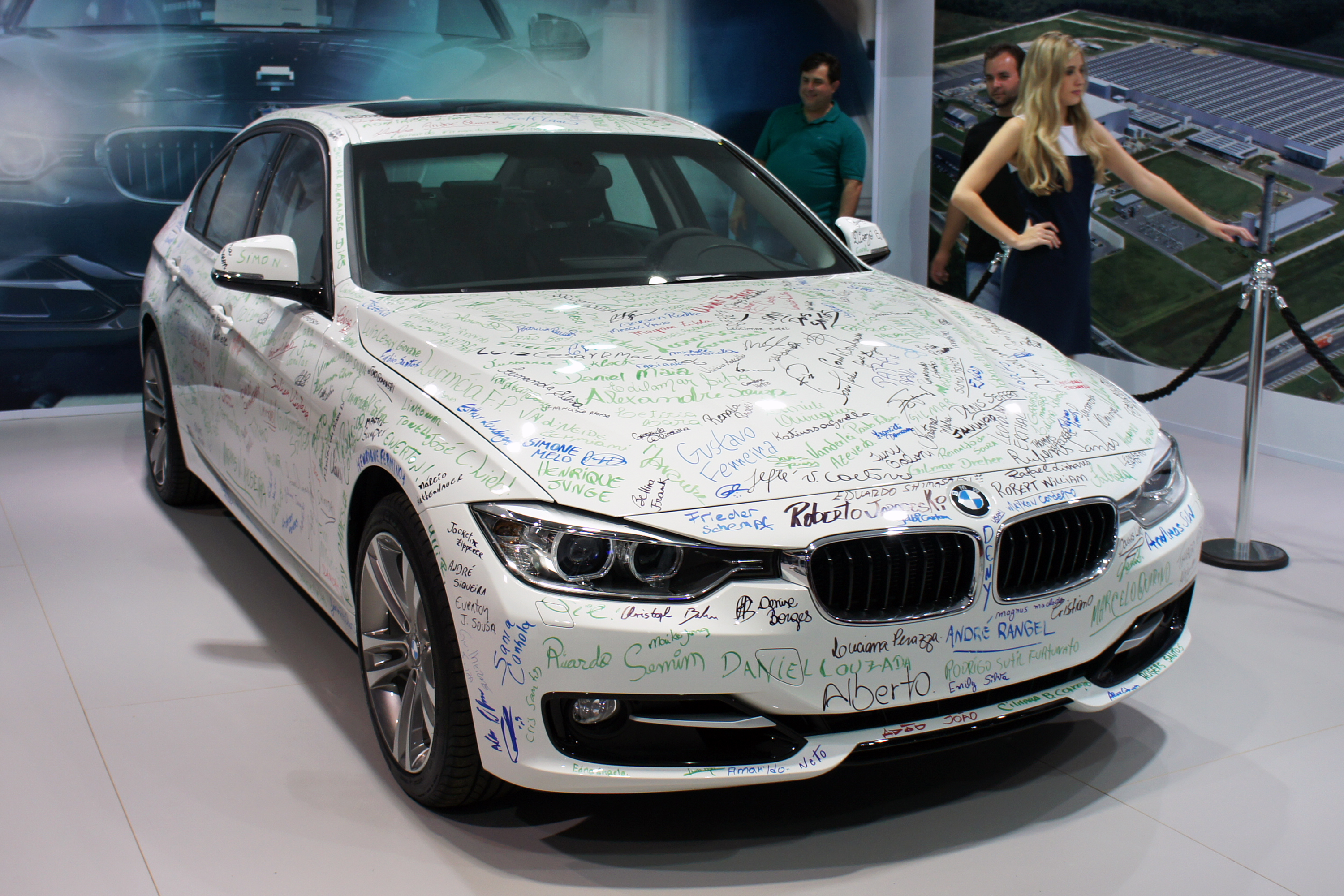
First BMW 328i ActiveFlex manufactured in Brazil, at the Araquari plant, in the metro area of Joinville. The car was signed by all the workers on the production line.

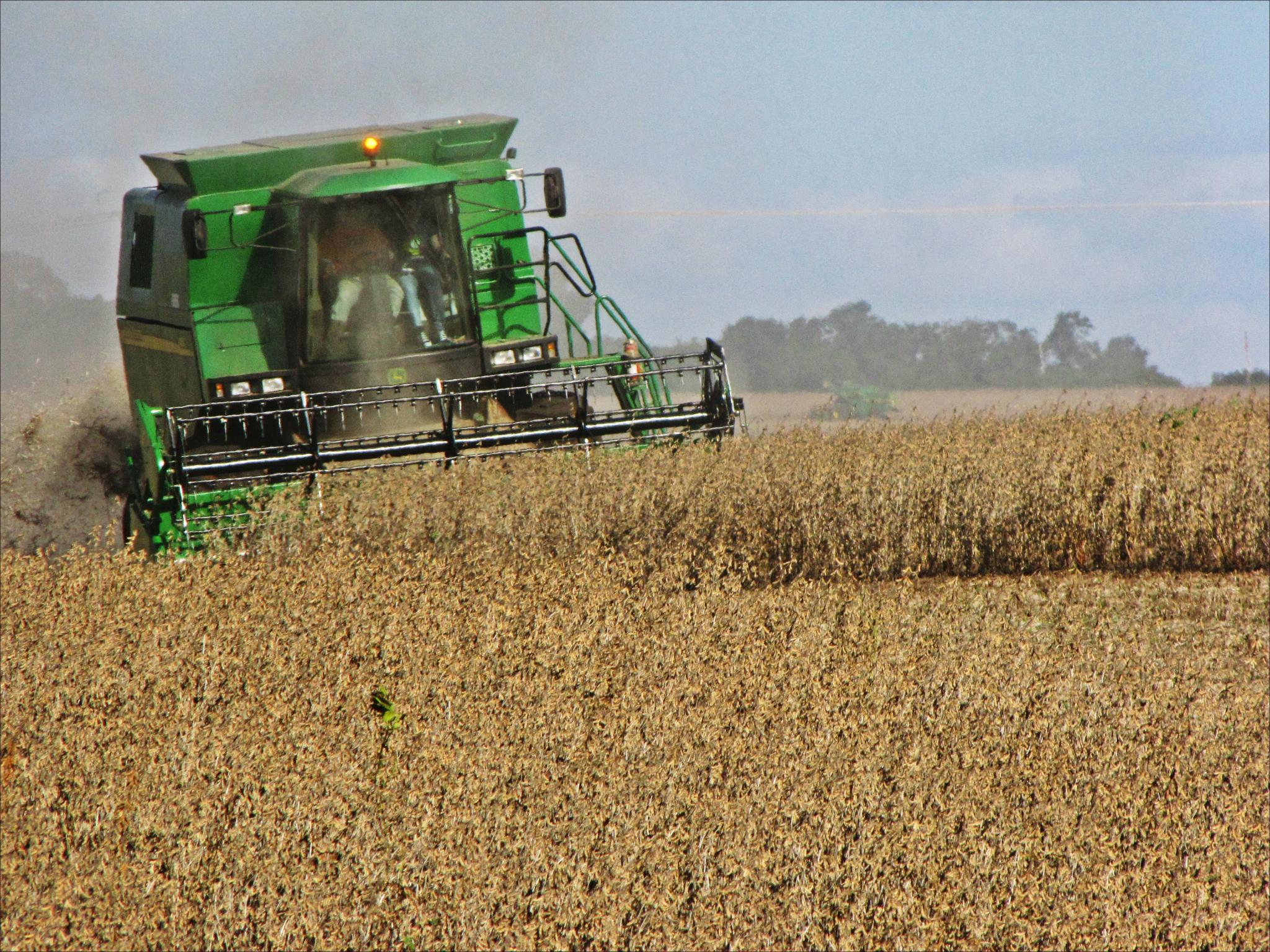
John Deere produces agricultural machinery in Brazil.

The Brazilian automotive industry is coordinated by the Associação Nacional dos Fabricantes de Veículos Automotores (Anfavea), created in 1956, which includes automakers (cars, light vehicles, trucks, buses and agriculture machines) with factories in Brazil. Anfavea is part of the Organisation Internationale des Constructeurs d'Automobiles (OICA), based in Paris. In 2021, the annual production exceeded 2.2 million vehicles, the 8th largest in the world.

Most large global automotive companies are present in Brazil, such as: BMW, BYD, Chery, Ford, Geely, General Motors, Honda, Hyundai, JAC, Jaguar Land Rover, Lifan, Mercedes-Benz, Mitsubishi, Nissan, Renault, Stellantis, Subaru, Toyota, Volkswagen, Volvo, among others, as well as national companies such as Agrale, Marcopolo, Randon, and more. In the past there were national brands such as DKW Vemag, FNM, Gurgel, and Troller. Some traditionally produced modern equipped replicas of older models.

== History ==
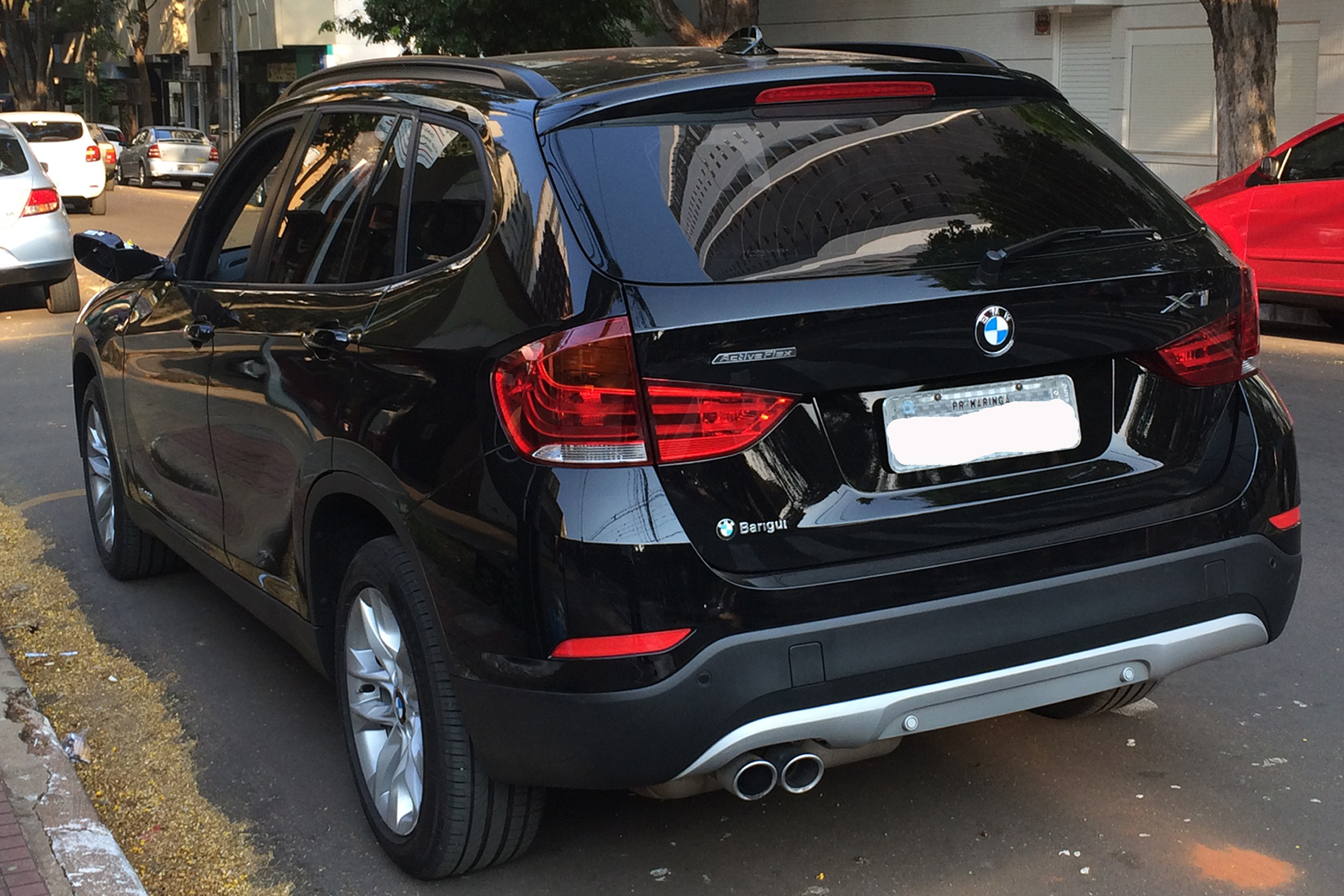
BMW X1 Activeflex (flexible-fuel) made in Brazil

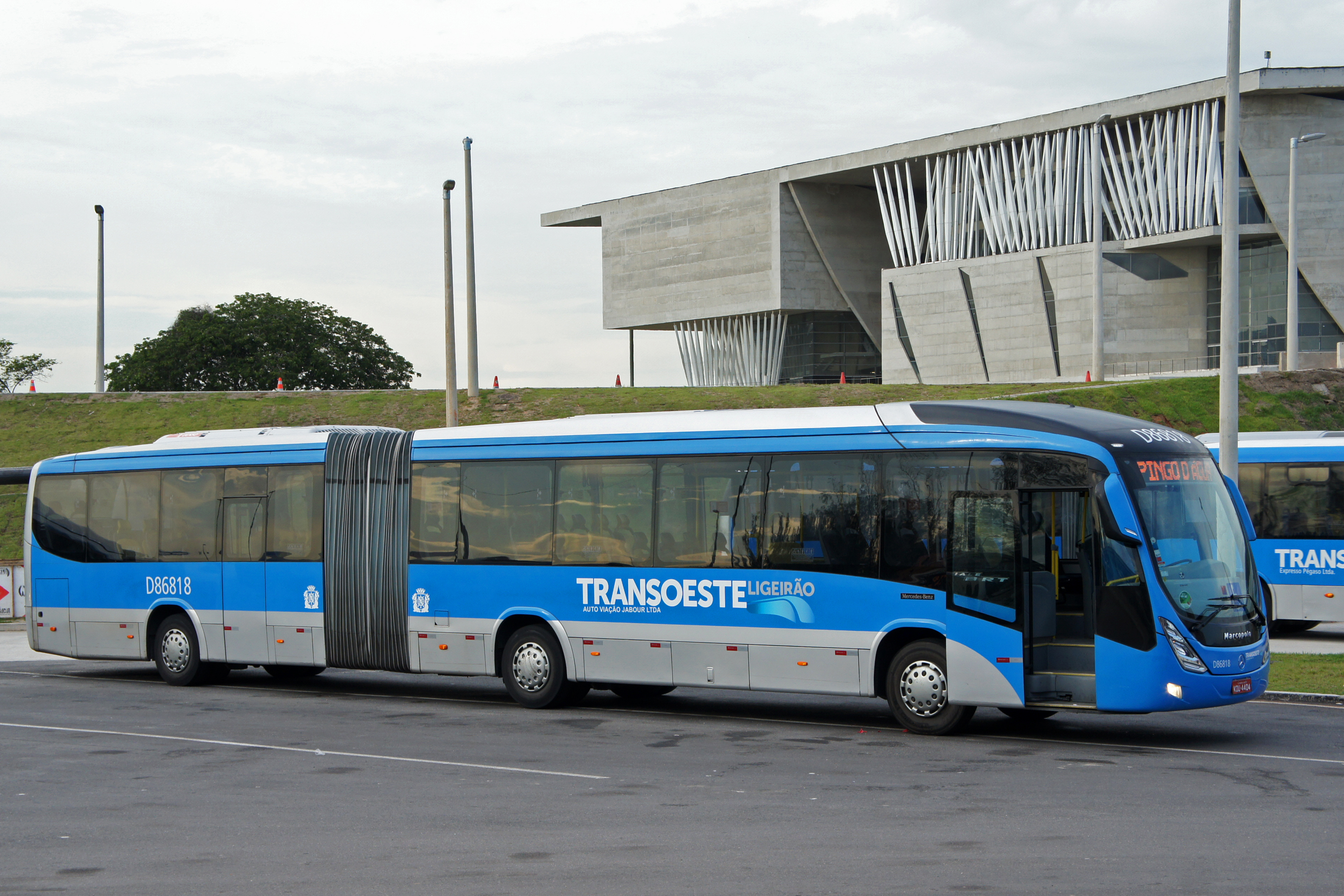
Mercedes-Benz bus made in Brazil, serving the city of Rio de Janeiro

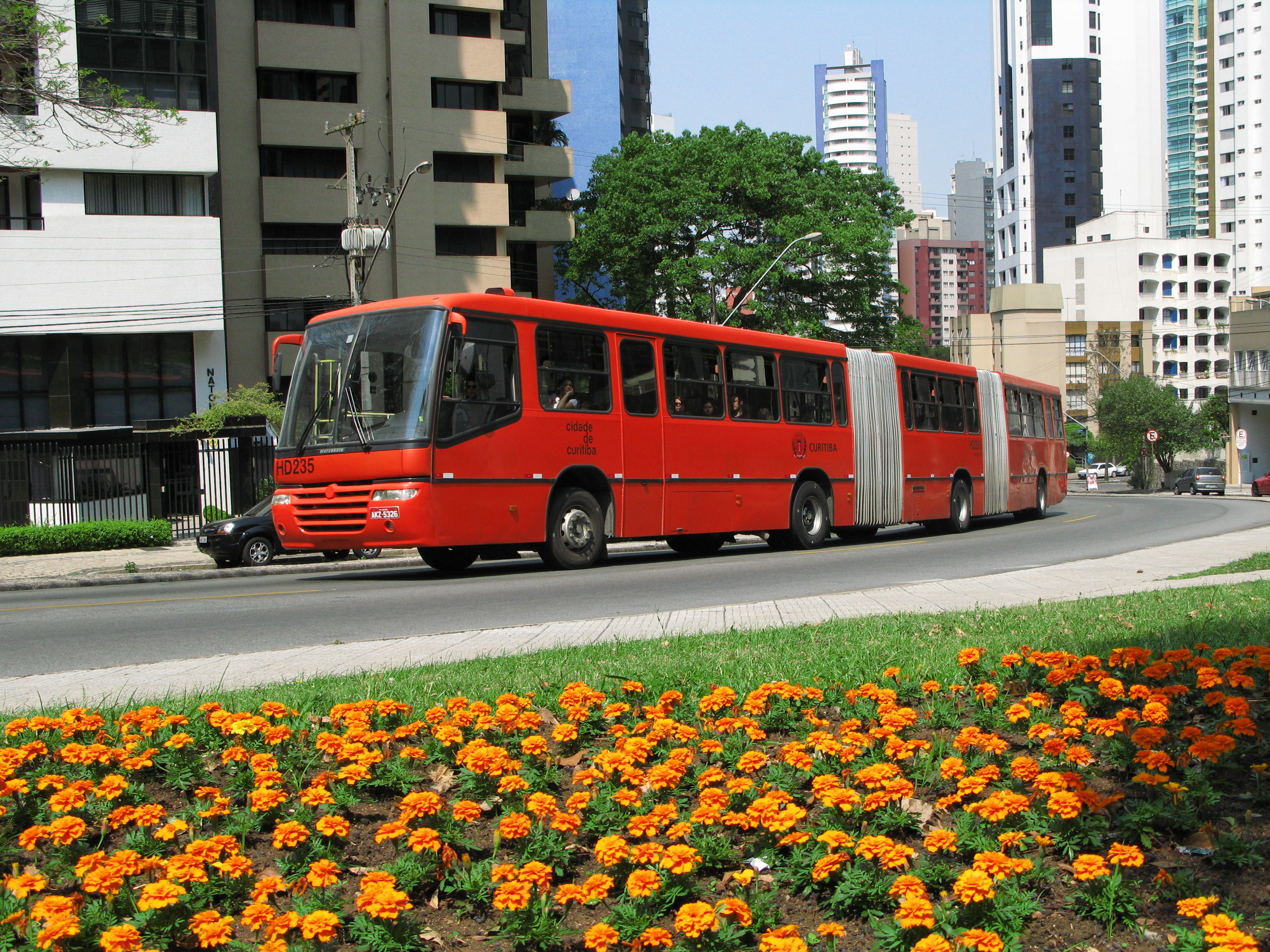
Marcopolo bus, made in Brazil, in the city of Curitiba

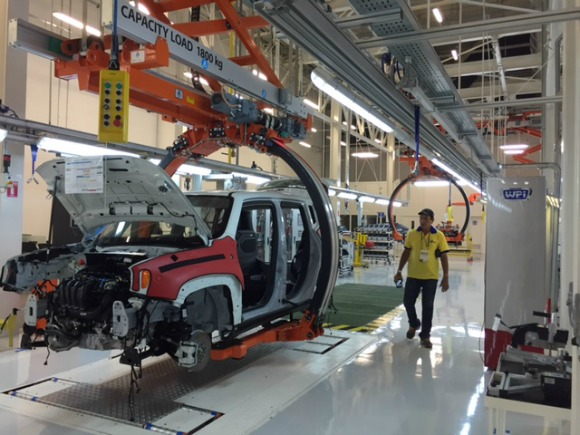
Fiat Chrysler Automobiles production in the metro area of Recife

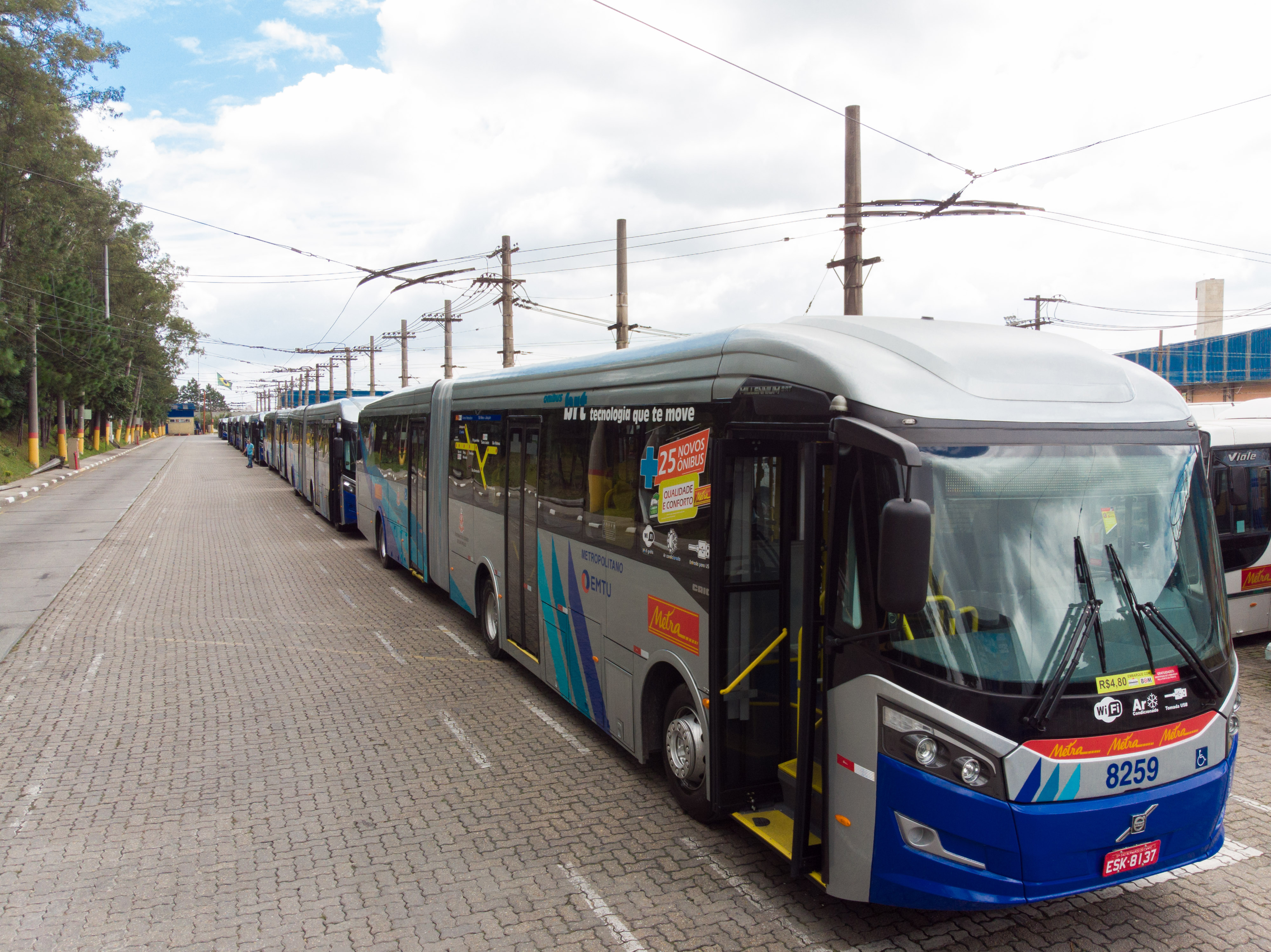
Volvo buses made in Brazil, serving the metro area of São Paulo

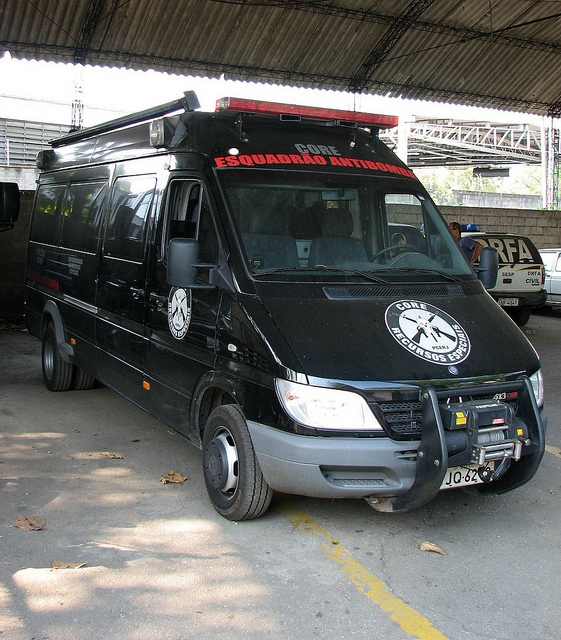
Mercedes-Benz police van, made in Brazil, in the city of Rio de Janeiro

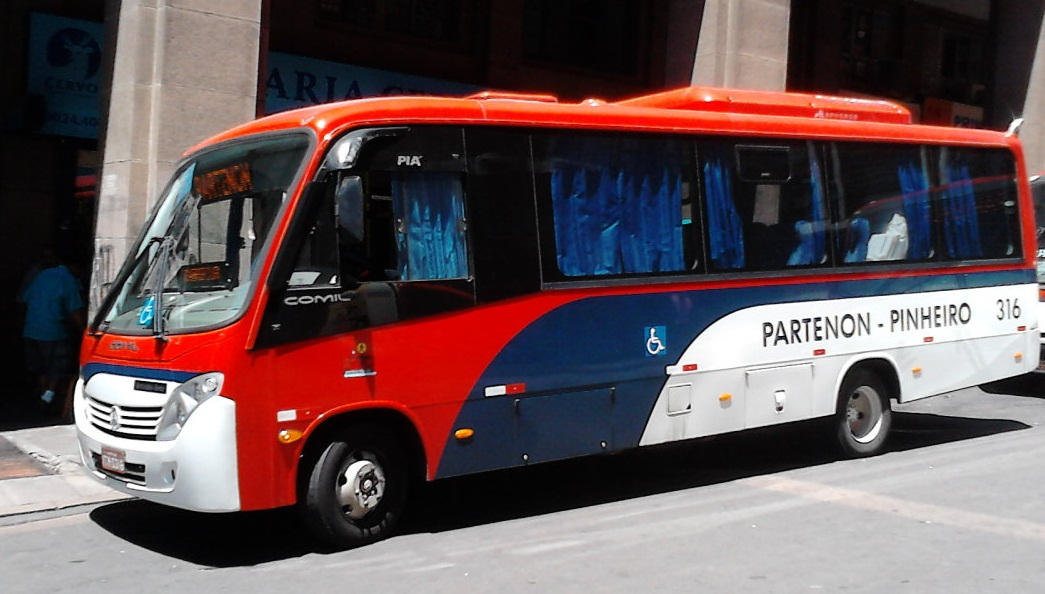
Mercedes-Benz micro bus made in Brazil, serving the city of Porto Alegre

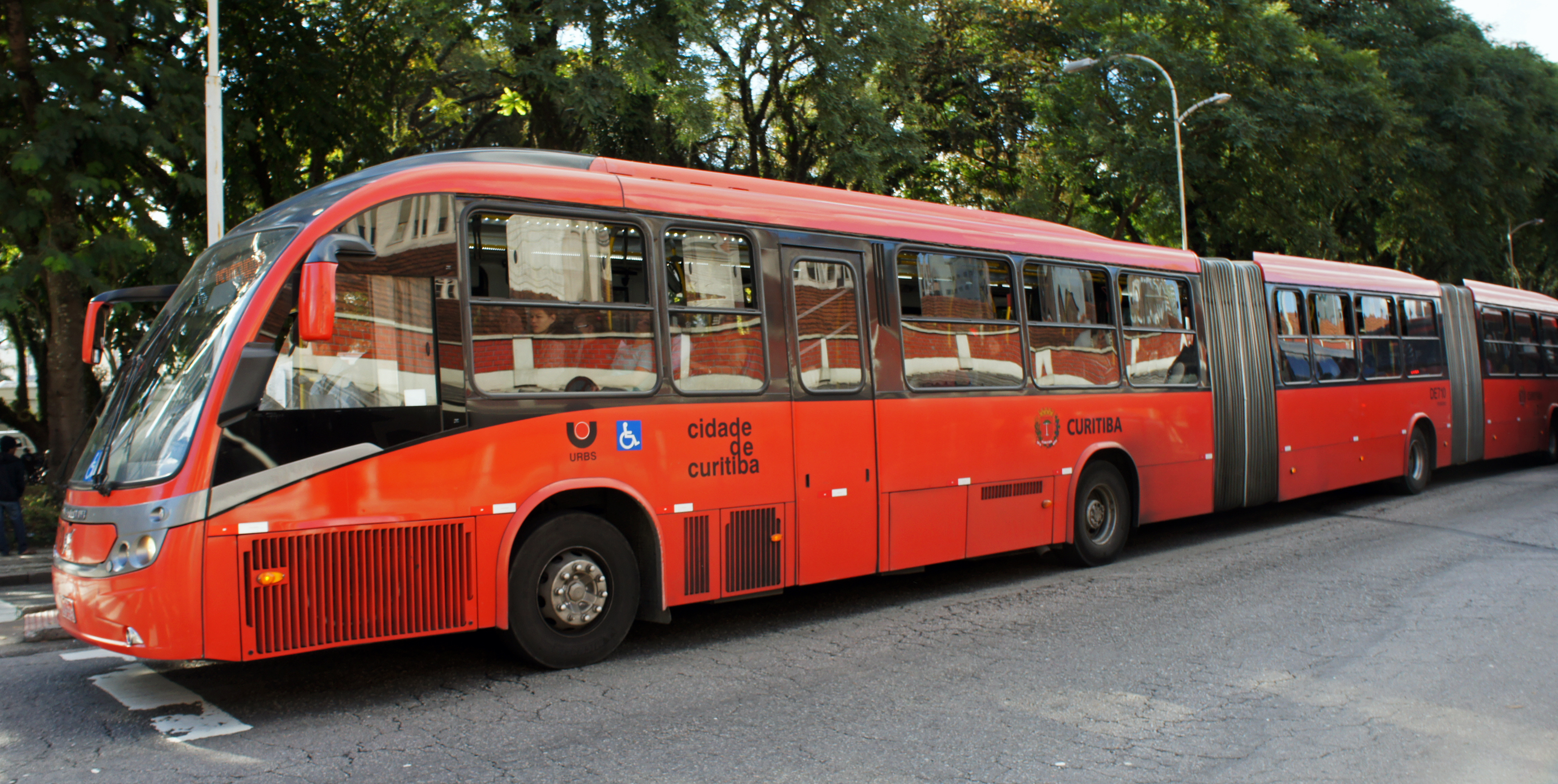
Volvo bus, made in Brazil, in the city of Curitiba

The first Brazilian automotive industry was the work of Henry Ford, who started the Brazilian subsidiary of Ford Motor Company in 1919. In 1921 Ford opened its own production facility and was followed by General Motors in 1926. In 1928, Ford established the Fordlândia, an industrial district in the Amazon rainforest. The district is no longer in use but saw a populational growth compared to the early 2000s, when roughly 90 people lived in the town.

In 1956, the Romi-Isetta, an early Brazilian car, was initially produced, with license purchase of Italian Iso. In 1958, Toyota started to produce its famous Bandeirante. In 1959, the first Volkswagen factory was built, it started manufacturing the Type 2, which preceded the famous Beetle. At the same time, a Brazilian entrepreneur, Mr. Sebastiao William Cardoso, started producing an electrical small jeep called Tupi.

In the late 1950s, Chevrolet and Ford started manufacturing pickup trucks, and in the 1960s, automobiles and commercial vehicles, GM also brought buses. In 1967, Puma began selling sports cars. The Italian Fiat established its first factory in the 1970s, and Mercedes-Benz started to produce trucks and buses during the 1950s, and opened an automobile factory in 1998. These companies dominated the Brazilian market until mid-1990s, when the Brazilian market was finally opened to imports. In the 1990s, more auto companies settled and opened factories in Brazil.

The automotive industry in Brazil sells to all over Latin America and the world. In the last few years, the Brazilian auto industry has grown quickly, attracting investments from the main global automakers. In 2007, production grew 14% compared to 2006 figures, reaching more than 4 million vehicles.

In October 2012, the Inovar-Auto Program was approved by decree with the theoretical goals of encouraging automakers to produce more fuel-efficient vehicles and investing in the national automotive industry, by managing taxation exceptions (IPI = Tax over Industrialized Product). However, the program has received criticism, especially of protectionism. The country has recently lost a WTO dispute against tax advantages and illegal practices of protectionism. The Inovar-Auto program ended in December 2017 and was replaced by the Route 2030 Program.

=== Timeline ===
==== 1890s ====
- 1891: The Peugeot Type 3, the very first vehicle in Brazil, was bought by Alberto Santos Dumont, after a trip to France. Dumont would later found the Automóvel Clube do Brasil (ACDB).
- 1897: Olavo Bilac was responsible for the first registered accident in Rio de Janeiro, the then federal capital had around 30 vehicles in circulation. Bilac crashed his friend's Serpollet in a tree and fell downhill, near the Tijuca road. Shortly after, a Mercedes-Benz collided with a horse-drawn vehicle, at the Botafogo beach.

==== 1900s ====
- 1903: First registered automobile, which belonged to Francisco Matarazzo, registered in São Paulo, with the first license plate, P-1.
- 1904: First Ford sold in the country was the Model A, imported by Ford representative William T. Right.
- 1907: Dumont founded the Automóvel Clube do Brasil (ACDB) and fought for safety regulations. President Affonso Pena was the first Brazilian President to be transported in a motor vehicle, from Charron, Girardot et Voigt.
- 1908–1909: The first car trip from Rio de Janeiro to São Paulo occurred on 7 March, conducted by the Count of Lesdain, Jacques Bouly de Lesdain, his wife and two drivers; they travelled 700 km (430 miles) in 33 days, aboard a Brasier. Bouly de Lesdain also climbed the Corcovado. Inspired by the idea, the brothers Paulo and Antônio Prado decided to go from São Paulo to Santos, the route was completed in 37 hours, on a Motobloc. The trip to Santos is considered the ground zero of road development in Brazil; Independent importers start bringing the Ford Model T; The vehicle used by Affonso Pena was damaged, it was eventually replaced by the Renault Tybe CB. In 1909, back in Brazil, Jacques Bouly de Lesdain travelled 180 km (110 miles), from São Paulo to Campinas in 25 hours.

==== 1910s ====
- 1911: The first Brazilian automotive magazine, "Revista de Automóveis", was launched in Rio de Janeiro by the Automóvel Clube do Brasil, founded by Santos Dumont; the collection can be observed in the Automotive Press Museum (Miau), in São Paulo.
- 1908-1913: The first trip by car from Rio de Janeiro to São Paulo was in 1908. The first trip by car from São Paulo to Curitiba was in 1913.
- 1917: By now, the State of São Paulo had a fleet of 2,600 motor vehicles. In 1918, the first female driver in São Paulo, the wife of the commander of the Port of Santos, operated her automobile under protest from traditional families.
- 1919: The first automotive industry of Brazil was implemented by Henry Ford. Ford's head office in the United States opens a statewide branch, with initial capital of US$25,000 (equivalent to $464,251 in 2025). Model T and TT trucks began to be assembled in São Paulo.

==== 1920s ====
- 1921: The Brazilian Ford branch moves into its own building in the Bom Retiro neighborhood, opening its own production facility, known as Solon Plant. The São Paulo-Campinas highway was inaugurated by Washington Luís, the first highway built specifically for car and truck traffic.
- 1924: The first Brazilian automotive exhibition, a predecessor of the São Paulo International Motor Show, was held by Ford, at the Palace of Industry in São Paulo, near Tamanduateí River; At least 30,000 vehicles were already circulating through the country's streets.
- 1925: General Motors opened its first branch, in Ipiranga, São Paulo.
- 1926: International Harvester do Brasil, a truck manufacturer, was founded. It was the first automaker in the commercial vehicle segment to establish itself in the country.
- 1927: The rapid expansion of production and sales led General Motors do Brasil to acquire a vast area in São Caetano do Sul, São Paulo. On 24 September 1927, bricks began to be laid on site. Two years later, in October 1929, the factory was operational.
- 1928: The Ford Model A, successor to the Model T, arrives in Brazil. Henry Ford created Fordlândia, a typical American village with 10,000 km^{2} (3,900 sq mi) in the middle of the Amazon rainforest in Pará.

==== 1930s ====
- 1930: Ford was followed by concurrent General Motors with the assembly of the first Chevrolet cars in São Caetano do Sul, São Paulo, there until today, at Avenida Goiás.
- 1934: With the end of Fordlândia, Ford exchanged part of the land for another area, called Belterra where 3.2 million rubber trees were planted, followed by US$8 million in investments; GM produced the first bus body made in Brazil, made of wood.
- 1939: Massey-Harris opened a branch in Porto Alegre. Its agricultural machinery carried out the first mechanized rice harvest in Brazil; The São Paulo-Santos highway was named Via Anchieta.

==== 1940s ====
- 1940: The Interlagos Circuit was inaugurated. The first trip from São Paulo to Fortaleza by car was completed in a Chevrolet in 25 days.
- 1941: The General Motors and Ford plants, as well as those of other manufacturers, were submitted to the military command and started to assemble war vehicles with some companies producing components by their headquarters and supplied to Brazil under loan. Foundation of the Companhia Siderúrgica Nacional (CSN), in Volta Redonda, Rio de Janeiro, foundry and iron works serving local steel to own country industry, not depending in imported goods, suffered by WWII; The Fábrica Nacional de Motores (FNM) is, officially, the first Brazilian company in the automotive sector. Created by Getúlio Vargas, the state-owned company had its headquarters in Xerém, Duque de Caxias, operations began only a few years later, due to the difficulties caused by the Second World War.
- 1945: Studebaker Automobile Distributor founded, which gave rise to Vemag.
- 1948: General Motors produced the first all-metal bus body with domestic raw material from CSN.

==== 1950s ====
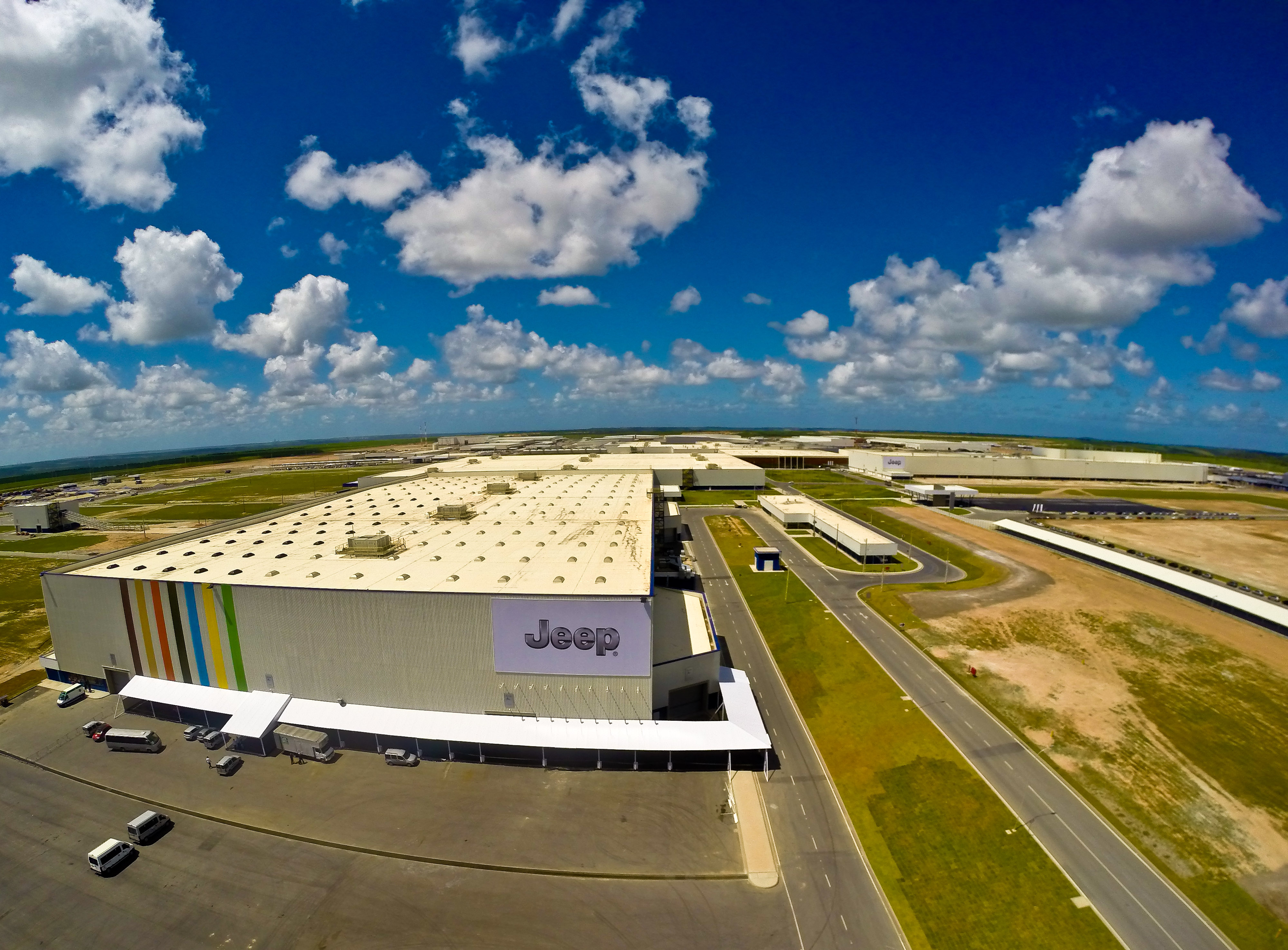
Jeep Renegade assembly line in the metro area of Recife

- 1950: FNM signed an agreement to produce trucks with Alfa Romeo.
- 1951: The Associação da Indústria de Peças para Automóveis e Similares was founded, the embryo of the Sindicato Nacional de Componentes para Veículos Automotores (Sindipeças).
- 1952: The Subcommittee for Jeeps, Tractors, Trucks, and Automobiles was established for the purpose of facilitating investments in the automotive industry. Willys Overland was founded.
- 1953: Volkswagen do Brasil was founded and assembly began in the Ipiranga neighborhood; Mercedes-Benz was founded in Via Anchieta; The importation of completely built units (CBU) became prohibited, to protect the local market; Petrobras, main local fuel supplier and producer was founded and implemented, during Juscelino Kubitschek President Campaign; Ford inaugurated a manufacturing plant in Ipiranga.
- 1954: Caterpillar established in Santo Amaro, São Paulo, with a warehouse for marketing, manufacturing and stocking components and parts.
- 1955: The Associação Profissional dos Fabricantes de Tratores, Caminhões, Automóveis e Veículos Similares was founded; First engine block cast in Brazil and Latin America, ordered by Mercedes-Benz.
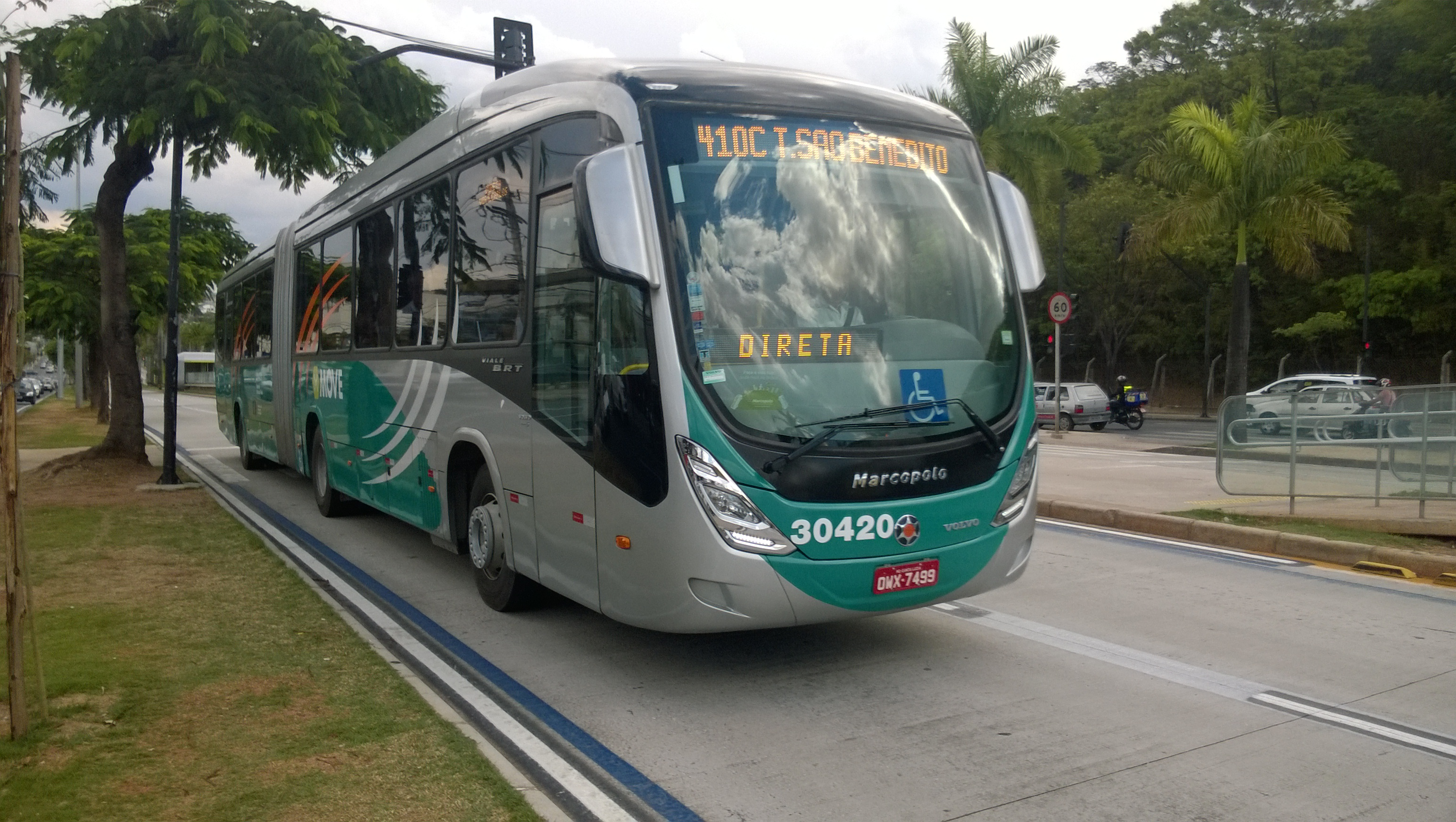
  Marcopolo bus, made in Brazil, in the city of Belo Horizonte.
- 1956: The Executive Group of the Automobile Industry, or GEIA, which created the legislation that allowed the automotive industrialization in Brazil, was established; Inauguration of the Mercedes-Benz plant in São Bernardo do Campo; Romi Industries launches the Romi-Isetta; The National Association of Motor Vehicle Manufacturers, (ANFAVEA) was founded.
- 1957: Volkswagen opened its biggest plant in country in São Bernardo do Campo-SP; Ford nationalized truck manufacturing; Simca was founded.
- 1958: Arrival of Toyota, in one of the most important chapters in the history of the manufacturer, the company installed the brand's first operation outside Japan; Willys and Ford opened their first casting plants. Scania began producing trucks; General Motors inaugurated another manufacturing plant in São Caetano do Sul.
- 1959: Volkswagen officially opens its São Bernardo do Campo plant; Scania opens a factory in Ipiranga; Karmann-Ghia was founded; The National Plan for the Agricultural Tractor Industry was created to stimulate the production of agricultural vehicles. At the same time, a Brazilian entrepreneur started producing an electrical small jeep called Tupi.

==== 1960s ====
- 1960: ANFAVEA launches the first edition of its statistical yearbook; Valmet do Brasil is founded with the inauguration of a tractor factory in Mogi das Cruzes, São Paulo; The Companhia Brasileira de Tratores (CBT) was established; Ford starts producing tractors at the Ipiranga plant; The Quatro Rodas magazine was launched, it has since established itself as the most important reference for the Brazilian automotive industry; The 1st São Paulo International Motor Show was held in Ibirapuera Park, São Paulo.
- 1961: The first Brazilian commercial vehicles were exported, the Mercedes-Benz O-321 was exported to Argentina and Venezuela; Massey Ferguson inaugurated a tractor plant.
- 1962: Scania and Toyota inaugurated their factories, in São Bernardo do Campo; The Agrisa, Industria Gaúcha de Implementos Agrícolas, was formed.
- 1964: The Autoesporte, one of the most important car magazines in Brazil, was released.
- 1965: The first wave of affordable vehicles, with lower price and taxes was released by DKW-Vemag, Willys and Volkswagen models; Agrisa was acquired and renamed to Agrale; The São Paulo Vehicle Dealers' Association came to be national in scope, becoming the Brazilian Association for Authorized Vehicle Resale (Abrave) afterwards known as Fenabrave.
- 1966: Willys inaugurated its Jaboatão dos Guararapes plant in Pernambuco, the first manufacturing plant in the Northeast Region; Chrysler was established after Simca's purchase.
- 1967–1969: Volkswagen purchased Vemag; Tratores Fiat was founded, Alfa Romeo acquired FNM and Puma began selling sports cars. Chrysler started the production in Brazil; Gurgel Motores was founded.

==== 1970s ====
- 1970: The 7th annual São Paulo International Motor Show was held at the Anhembi Convention Center, in São Paulo.
- 1972: The Ford 'Engine and Foundry Factory' was inaugurated, Ford's President, Joseph W. O'Neill, announced more than US$400 million (equivalent to $2.4 billion in 2020) in investments for the expansion of the company's activities in Brazil.
- 1975: Anfavea opened its headquarters in São Paulo. Komatsu established itself with a tractor manufacturing plant, in Suzano, São Paulo. New Holland opened a plant in Curitiba, Paraná. The National Alcohol Program (Proálcool) was created, the main objective of the program was to become less dependent on petroleum.
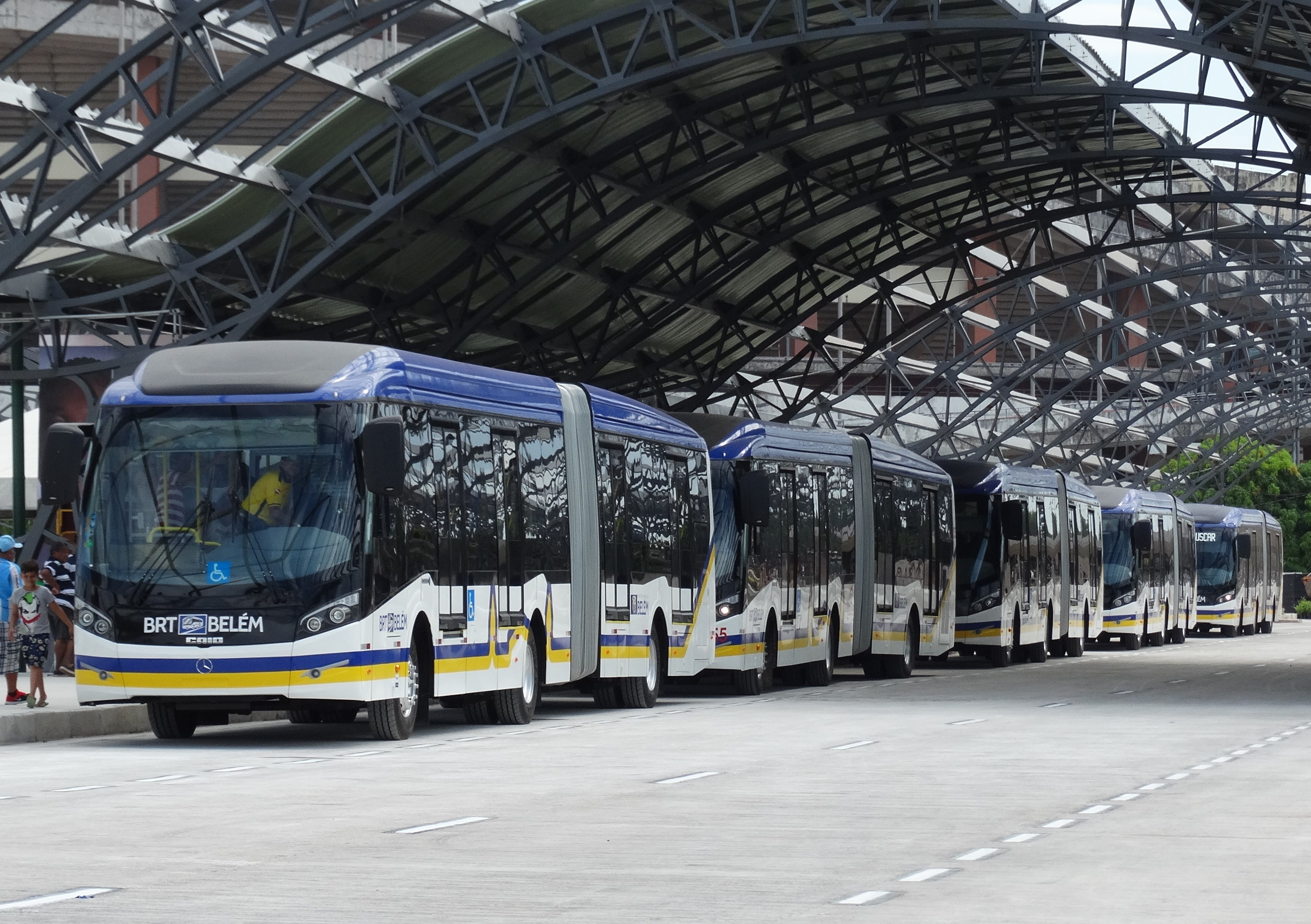
  Mercedes-Benz bus, made in Brazil, in the city of Belém
- 1976: Fiat established its first factory, in Betim, Minas Gerais. Fiat acquired the remaining shares of Alfa Romeo and unveiled new trucks, manufactured in the old FNM branches in Xerém. Caterpillar inaugurated plant in Piracicaba, São Paulo. Volkswagen opened a manufacturing plant in Taubaté. A Ford tractor factory was inaugurated.
- 1978: The Brazilian automotive industry reached the historic mark of a million units manufactured in a single year. Labor movements were responsible for the first strikes in the metal works industry in São Paulo.
- 1979: Volvo began producing buses and engines. Caoa, a Ford distributor, was founded. Mercedes-Benz opened a bus manufacturing plant in Campinas. The "Lei Ferrari" (Ferrari Law), which regulates vehicle commercial concession and distribution, came into effect. The law establishes equality in sale price of vehicles and parts to dealers. In 2012, government representatives highlighted that the so-called "Ferrari Law", was one of the main obstacles to reducing car prices and prevents increased competition in the automotive market.

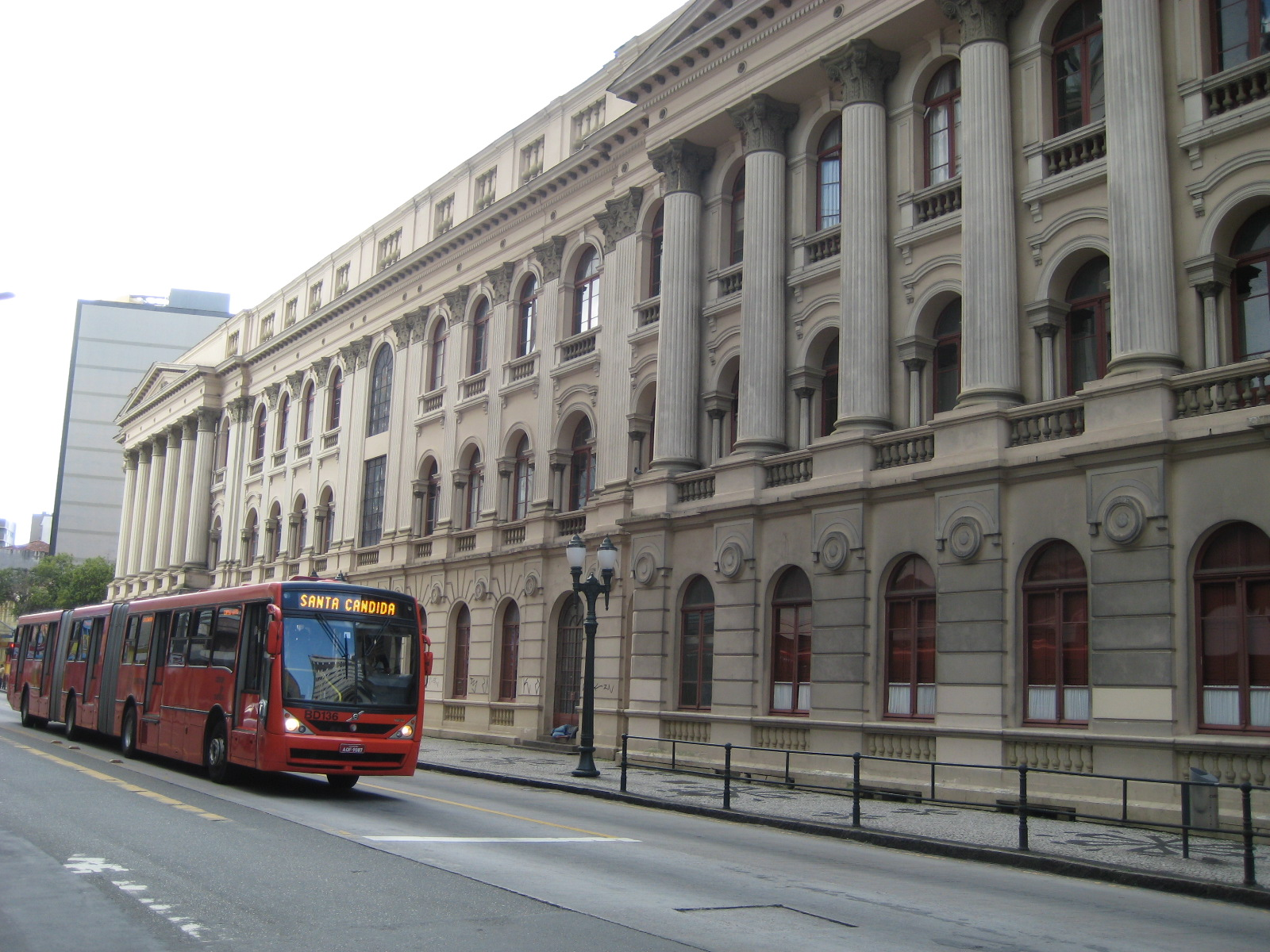
Volvo bus, made in Brazil, in the city of Curitiba

==== 1980s ====
- 1980: Volvo opened a plant in Curitiba and began manufacturing trucks. Volkswagen purchased Chrysler.
- 1981: Volkswagen began producing trucks in Resende, Rio de Janeiro. Agrale began manufacturing trucks and motorcycles.
- 1986: Ford purchased New Holland. Proconve, the Automotive Vehicle Air Pollution Control Program was created.
- 1987: Ford and Volkswagen merged to create the Autolatina; Anfavea opened an office in Brasília.
- 1989: Volkswagen launched the first vehicle with electronic fuel injection, at the local market, the Gol GTi.

==== 1990s ====
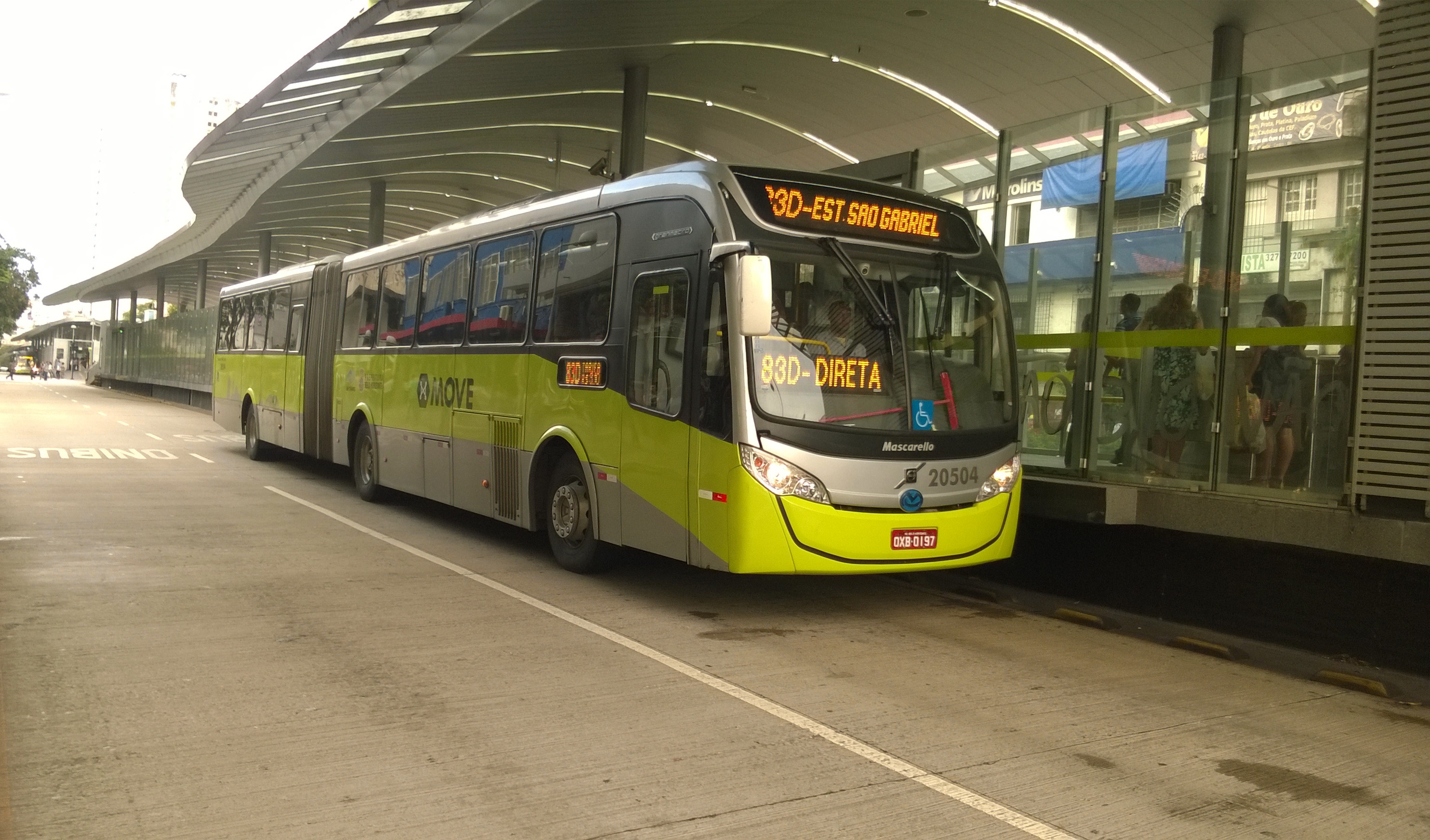
Volvo bus, made in Brazil, in the city of Belo Horizonte

- 1990: Fiat, Ford, General Motors and Volkswagen dominated the car market until the mid-1990s, and Mercedes-Benz, Scania and Volvo, the truck market in same period, when the Brazilian market was closed to imports; More auto companies settled and opened factories in Brazil, including Nissan, Renault, Peugeot, Citroën, Honda, Hyundai, Mitsubishi, Chrysler, BMW, Mercedes-Benz and Audi; Fiat acquired Ford's tractor operations; Agrale opened a further factory in Caxias do Sul, Rio Grande do Sul; AGCO emerged with the acquisition of Deutz Allis, which belonged to the German group KHD.
- 1991: Mitsubishi began operations, designating a representative that began importing pickup trucks. Land Rover began operating with imported vehicles.Citroën provided accreditation to an importer.
- 1992: Honda began further automotive activity in Brazil, importing vehicles and aggregating the motorcycles production in its factory, in Manaus, Amazonas; Peugeot became associated with a importation representative; Renault designated a representative and began importing some models; The 1st Automotive Sectoral Agreement was created.
- 1993: Nissan began activities with the importation of some models; Audi designated a representative to import its vehicles; The 2nd Automotive Sectoral Agreement was created; The "Carro Popular" program was started.
- 1994: Anfavea inaugurated the Documentation Center for Brazilian Automotive Industry (Cedoc); The 1st Agriculture Fair (Agrishow) was held in Ribeirão Preto; Hyundai designated a representative to Brazil.
- 1995: Creation of the 3rd Automotive Sector Agreement; BMW took over the operation of imported vehicles, as BMW do Brasil.
- 1996: AGCO acquired Iochpe-Maxion and Massey Ferguson in Brazil; Volkswagen inaugurated an engine manufacturing plant in São Carlos, São Paulo. Volkswagen Caminhões e Ônibus opened another factory in Resende, producing the local engineered Constellation truck segment;
- 1997: Honda opened a factory in Sumaré and introduced the local-made Civic; Case Tractors inaugurated a manufacturing plant in Piracicaba; Peugeot Citroën do Brasil was formed; Komatsu inaugurated its second plant, in Arujá, São Paulo.
- 1998: Renault opened a plant in São José dos Pinhais, Paraná; Mitsubishi inaugurates a manufacturing plant in Catalão, Goiás; Toyota opened a plant in Sumaré and introduced the locally-manufactured Corolla; Chrysler inaugurated a factory plant in Campo Largo, Paraná; Land Rover signed an agreement with Karmann-Ghia and to begin operating in São Bernardo do Campo; Caoa took over the representation of Subaru.
- 1999: Volkswagen and Audi opened factories in São José dos Pinhais, Paraná; Mercedes-Benz opened a factory in Juiz de Fora, Minas Gerais; Fiat Industrial acquired the CNH Global, creating the CNH Industrial; Caoa began representing Hyundai.

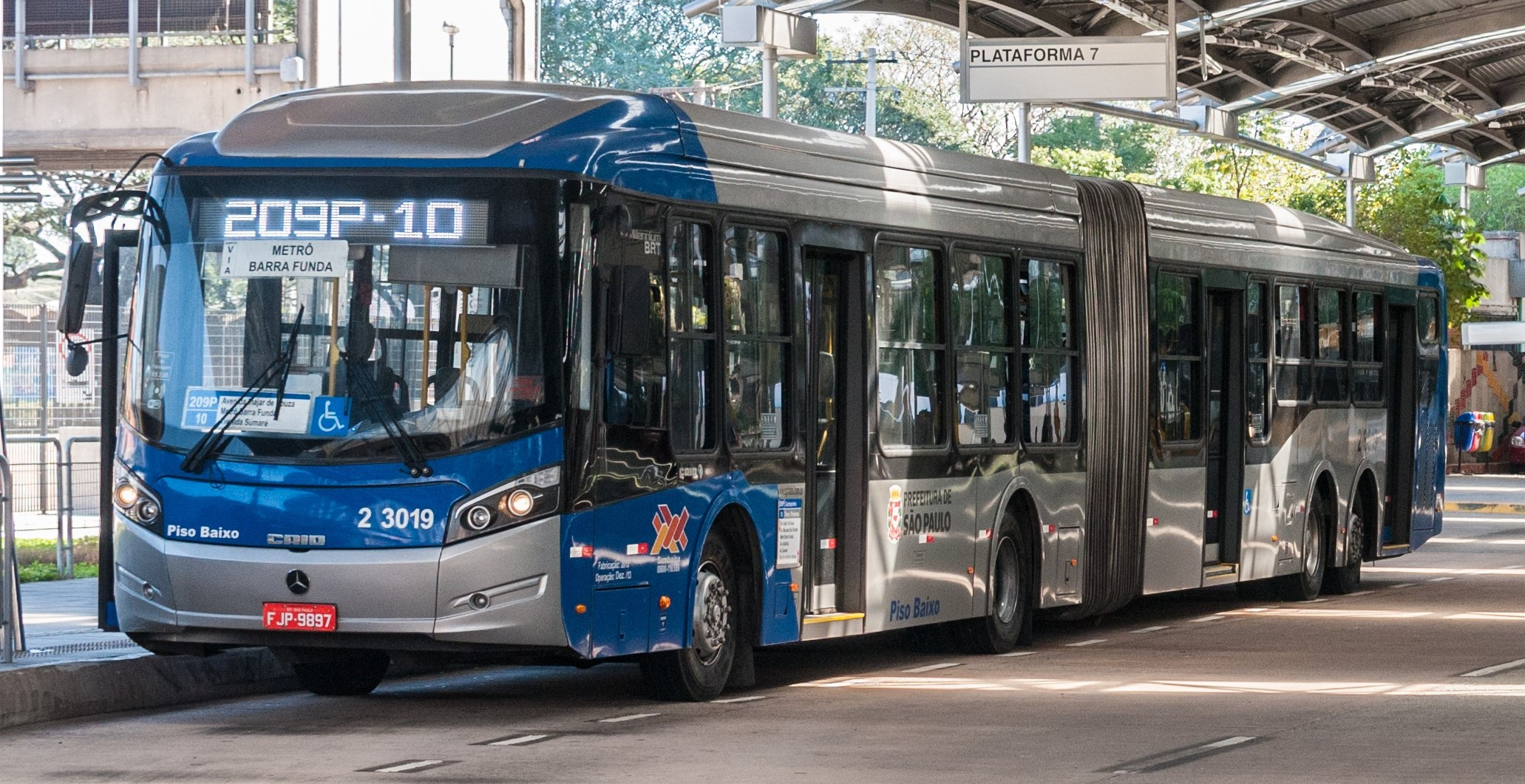
Mercedes-Benz bus, made in Brazil, in the city of São Paulo

==== 2000s ====
- 2000: General Motors opened a manufacturing plant in Gravataí; Iveco inaugurated a factory in Minas Gerais.
- 2001: Ford opened a factory in Camaçari, Bahia; PSA Group opened Peugeot Citroën plant in Porto Real, Rio de Janeiro; Nissan began production in Brazil at the Renault factory in São José dos Pinhais.
- 2003: Ford unveiled the EcoSport, introducing the compact SUV market segment in Brazil; AGCO purchased Valtr, formerly Valmet.
- 2005: For the first time flex-fuel vehicles sold more than gasoline vehicles, with a total of 753,000 units against 647,000 units, respectively; Audi took control over the importation operations.
- 2007: Caoa opened factory in Anápolis; Domestic production grew 14% compared to 2006 figures, reaching more than 4 million vehicles.
- 2006–2009: ANFAVEA celebrates 50 years; Caoa opened a factory in Anápolis; Domestic production grew 14% compared to 2006 figures, reaching more than 4 million vehicles; Fiat and Chrysler signed a global agreement creating the FCA.

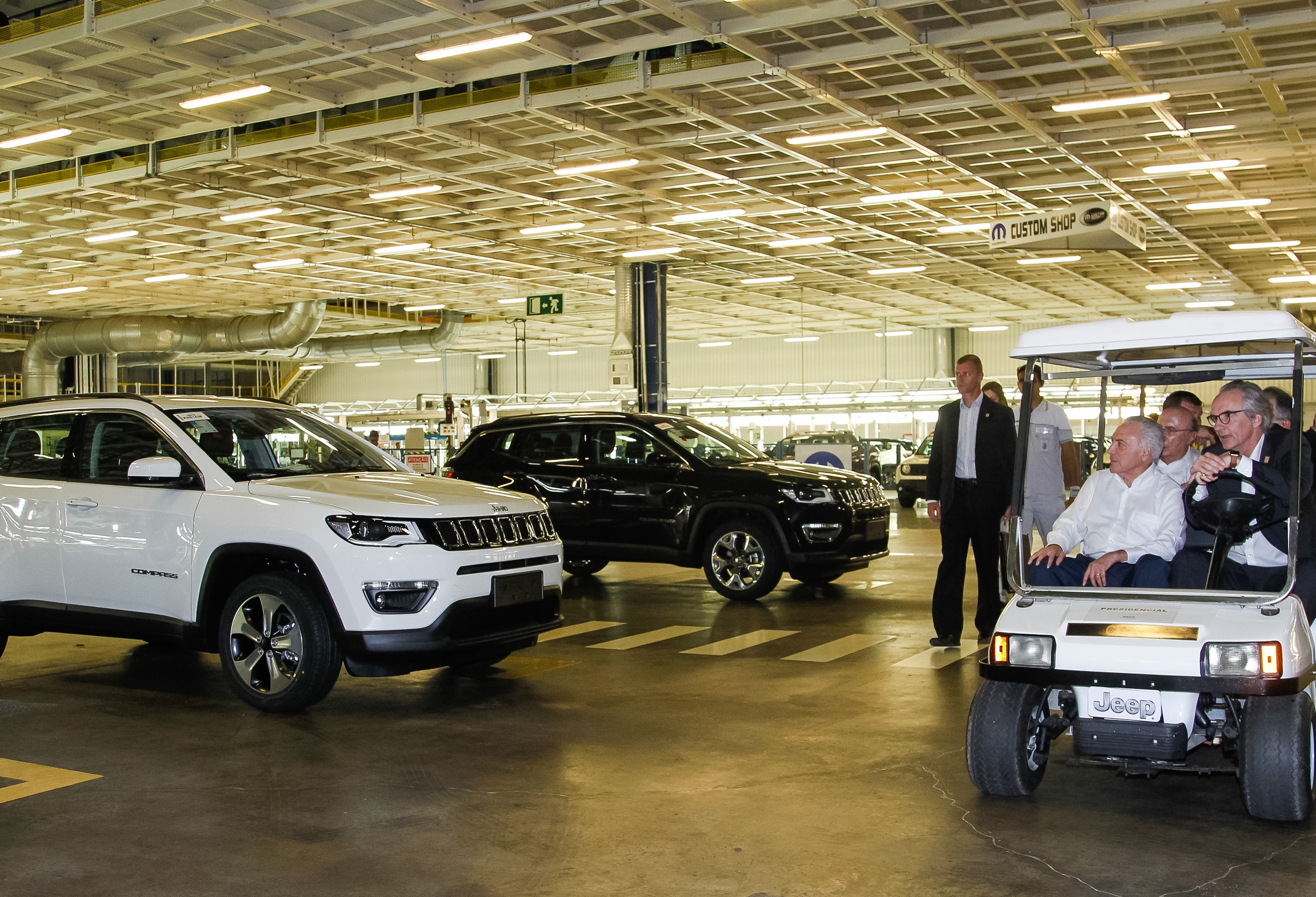
Former Brazilian president Michel Temer during a visit to the Jeep industrial plant in the metro area of Recife

==== 2010s ====
- 2010–2011: CNH Industrial opened factory in Sorocaba, São Paulo; Caterpillar inaugurated a plant in Campo Largo, Paraná; The Brazilian automotive industry reached the mark of 10 million flex-fuel vehicles produced; DAF Trucks (DAF Caminhões) was established in Brazil.
- 2012: General Motors opened a manufacturing plant in Joinville, Santa Catarina; Hyundai inaugurated a manufacturing plant in Piracicaba; Toyota opened a factory in Sorocaba; On October, the Inovar-Auto program was approved by decree with the theoretical goals of encouraging automakers to produce more fuel efficient vehicles and investing in the national automotive industry, by managing taxation exceptions (IPI = tax over industrialized product). However, the program has received criticism, especially of protectionism; Recently, Brazil lost a WTO dispute against tax advantages and illegal practices of protectionism.
- 2013–2015: DAF Caminhões inaugurated a manufacturing plant in Ponta Grossa, Paraná; CNH Industrial was created after a merger between Fiat Industrial and CNH Global; BMW opened a manufacturing plant in Araquari, Santa Catarina; Nissan opened a factory in Resende; Agrale inaugurated chassis manufacturing plant in São Mateus, São Paulo. FCA inaugurated Jeep assembly plant in Goiana, Pernambuco.
- 2016–2018: Jaguar Land Rover opened a manufacturing plant in Itatiaia, Rio de Janeiro; Mercedes-Benz opened a plant in Campinas and Iracemápolis; The annual São Paulo International Motor Show took place at the São Paulo Expo for the first time; ANFAVEA elected to participate in the board of the International Organization of Vehicle Manufacturers, the OICA; Toyota inaugurated an engine manufacturing plant in Porto Feliz, São Paulo; The 21st edition of Fenatran was held at the São Paulo Expo; Caoa Group and Chery signed an agreement forming Caoa Chery; Decree of the Route 2030 Program signed with the then-president Michel Temer.
- 2019: Honda opened a manufacturing plant in Itirapina, São Paulo; Toyota introduced the Corolla, the world's first hybrid flex-fuel vehicle; Between 1957 and 2019 more than 84.4 million motor vehicles and 2.77 million trucks were produced in Brazil.

==== 2020s ====
- 2020: Vehicle production drops to 1957 levels due to the COVID-19 pandemic.
- 2021: Great Wall Motors (GWM) bought the Mercedes-Benz factory in Iracemápolis; Ford Brazil and Troller were closed by Ford; Creation of the Stellantis Group, merger of PSA and FCA.
- 2022: Great Wall Motor (GWM) officially opened the factory in January 2022, promoting electric SUVs and pickup trucks, production schedule to start in 2023; Toyota announces the transfer of its industrial operation from São Bernardo do Campo to Indaiatuba and Porto Feliz, with completion scheduled for November 2023. The company said that 100% of its 550 employees will keep their jobs, the plant produces parts for Brazil, Argentina and the United States. The São Bernardo do Campo plant was opened in 1962.
- 2022: The Brazilian automotive sector plans the car of the future hybrid ethanol, because the local production of the biofuel is wide and accessible, being a clean energy. More than 92% of the cars in Brazil are moved by ethanol.
- 2024: Major Industries like GM, BYD, Stellantis, VW etc. are investing huge money value in upgrading engines of flexible hybrid technology and models as well as the factories in territory.

== Historical production by year ==
Year	Quantity	< 0.5	0.5 – 1 millions	1 – 2 millions	2 – 3 millions	3 – 4 millions
1950	–					
1960	133,000					
1970	416,089					
1980	1,165,174					
1990	914,466					
2000	1,681,517					
2005	2,530,840					
2006	2,611,034					
2007	2,970,818					
2008	3,220,475					
2009	3,182,617					
2010	3,381,728					
2011	3,406,150					
2012	3,402,508					
2013	3,712,380					
2014	3,364,890					
2015	2,429,463					
2016	2,157,379					
2017	2,699,672					
2018	2,880,724					
2019	2,944,962					
2020	2.014.055					
2021	2,248,253					
2022	2,370,000					
2023	2,320,000					
2024	2,553,000					
2025	2,644,000					

== Historical sales ==
Top 10 best-selling models in Brazil (new passenger and commercial vehicles), 1977–2025 Source : BSCB, Fenabrave Table indicators Mini (A) / Small (B) Car Medium (C) / Large (D) Car Executive (E) / Sports (S) Car Coupé utility / Pickup Crossover / SUV (J) Van
Year	Models and Ranking										Year
Year	1st	2nd	3rd	4th	5th	6th	7th	8th	9th	10th	Year
1977	Volkswagen Fusca	Volkswagen Brasilia	Volkswagen Passat	Ford Corcel	Chevrolet Chevette	Fiat 147	not available				1977
1978	Volkswagen Fusca	Volkswagen Brasilia	Fiat 147	Volkswagen Passat	Chevrolet Chevette	Ford Corcel	not available				1978
1979	Volkswagen Fusca	Volkswagen Brasilia	Fiat 147	Volkswagen Passat	Chevrolet Chevette	Ford Corcel	not available				1979
1980–1987 not available
1988	Volkswagen Gol	Chevrolet Monza	Ford Escort	Chevrolet Chevette	Fiat Uno	Volkswagen Voyage	Volkswagen Santana	Volkswagen Parati	Ford Del Rey	Chevrolet Opala	1988
1989	Volkswagen Gol	Chevrolet Monza	Ford Escort	Fiat Uno	Chevrolet Chevette	Volkswagen Santana	Volkswagen Parati	Volkswagen Voyage	Chevrolet Kadett	Chevrolet D-20	1989
1990	Volkswagen Gol	Fiat Uno	Chevrolet Monza	Volkswagen Parati	Chevrolet Kadett	Volkswagen Voyage	Ford Verona	Ford Escort	Chevrolet Chevette	Volkswagen Santana	1990
1991	Volkswagen Gol	Fiat Uno	Chevrolet Monza	Ford Escort	Chevrolet Kadett	Ford Verona	Volkswagen Parati	Volkswagen Apollo	Volkswagen Santana	Chevrolet Chevette	1991
1992	Volkswagen Gol	Fiat Uno	Chevrolet Monza	Chevrolet Kadett	Volkswagen Parati	Ford Escort	Chevrolet Chevette	Volkswagen Santana	Ford Verona	Fiat Tempra	1992
1993	Volkswagen Gol	Fiat Uno	Ford Escort	Chevrolet Kadett	Chevrolet Monza	Volkswagen Logus	Volkswagen Parati	Chevrolet Chevette	Fiat Tempra	Volkswagen Santana	1993
1994	Fiat Uno	Volkswagen Gol	Ford Escort	Fiat Tipo	Chevrolet Corsa	Chevrolet Monza	Chevrolet Kadett	Fiat Tempra	Volkswagen Logus	Volkswagen Parati	1994
1995	Volkswagen Gol	Fiat Uno	Chevrolet Corsa	Ford Escort	Fiat Tipo	Volkswagen Golf	Fiat Tempra	Chevrolet Kadett	Volkswagen Santana	Chevrolet Monza	1995
1996	Volkswagen Gol	Fiat Uno	Chevrolet Corsa (Hatch)	Fiat Palio	Ford Escort	Ford Fiesta	Chevrolet Vectra	Chevrolet Kadett	Volkswagen Santana	Fiat Tempra	1996
1997	Volkswagen Gol	Fiat Palio	Chevrolet Corsa (Hatch)	Fiat Uno	Ford Fiesta	Chevrolet Vectra	Volkswagen Parati	Ford Ka	Volkswagen Kombi	Fiat Palio Weekend	1997
1998	Volkswagen Gol	Fiat Palio	Chevrolet Corsa	Fiat Uno	Chevrolet Vectra	Ford Ka	Ford Fiesta	Ford Escort	Volkswagen Parati	Volkswagen Polo	1998
1999	Volkswagen Gol	not available									1999
2000	Volkswagen Gol	not available									2000
2001	Volkswagen Gol	Fiat Palio	Fiat Uno	Chevrolet Celta	Chevrolet Corsa (Sedan)	Chevrolet Corsa (Hatch)	Ford Fiesta	Fiat Palio Weekend	Fiat Siena	Volkswagen Golf	2001
2002	Volkswagen Gol	Chevrolet Corsa	Fiat Palio	Chevrolet Celta	Fiat Uno	Ford Fiesta	Renault Clio	Peugeot 206	Chevrolet Astra	Fiat Siena	2002
2003	Volkswagen Gol	Chevrolet Corsa	Fiat Palio	Chevrolet Celta	Fiat Uno	Ford Fiesta	Renault Clio	Fiat Siena	Chevrolet Astra	Toyota Corolla	2003
2004	Volkswagen Gol	Fiat Palio	Chevrolet Corsa	Chevrolet Celta	Fiat Uno	Ford Fiesta	Volkswagen Fox	Fiat Siena	Chevrolet Astra	Ford EcoSport	2004
2005	Volkswagen Gol	Chevrolet Corsa	Fiat Palio	Chevrolet Celta	Fiat Uno	Ford Fiesta	Volkswagen Fox	Ford EcoSport	Fiat Siena	Fiat Strada	2005
2006	Volkswagen Gol	Fiat Palio	Chevrolet Celta	Fiat Uno	Volkswagen Fox/Cross	Chevrolet Corsa (Sedan)	Fiat Siena	Ford Fiesta (Hatch)	Ford EcoSport	Fiat Strada	2006
2007	Volkswagen Gol	Fiat Palio	Fiat Uno	Volkswagen Fox/Cross	Chevrolet Celta	Chevrolet Corsa (Sedan)	Fiat Siena	Ford Fiesta (Hatch)	Fiat Strada	Chevrolet Prisma	2007
2008	Volkswagen Gol	Fiat Palio	Fiat Uno	Chevrolet Corsa (Sedan)	Chevrolet Celta	Volkswagen Fox/Cross	Fiat Siena	Fiat Strada	Honda Civic	Ford Ka	2008
2009	Volkswagen Gol	Fiat Palio	Fiat Uno	Chevrolet Celta	Chevrolet Corsa (Sedan)	Volkswagen Fox/Cross	Fiat Siena	Fiat Strada	Volkswagen Voyage	Ford Ka	2009
2010	Volkswagen Gol	Fiat Uno	Chevrolet Celta	Volkswagen Fox/Cross	Chevrolet Corsa (Sedan)	Fiat Palio	Fiat Siena	Fiat Strada	Ford Fiesta (Hatch)	Ford Ka	2010
2011	Volkswagen Gol	Fiat Uno	Chevrolet Celta	Chevrolet Corsa (Sedan)	Volkswagen Fox/Cross	Fiat Strada	Fiat Palio	Fiat Siena	Volkswagen Voyage	Ford Fiesta (Hatch)	2011
2012	Volkswagen Gol	Fiat Uno	Fiat Palio	Volkswagen Fox/Cross	Chevrolet Celta	Fiat Strada	Ford Fiesta (Hatch)	Fiat Siena	Chevrolet Corsa (Sedan)	Renault Sandero	2012
2013	Volkswagen Gol	Fiat Uno	Fiat Palio	Ford Fiesta (Hatch)	Volkswagen Fox/Cross	Fiat Siena	Fiat Strada	Chevrolet Onix	Hyundai HB20	Renault Sandero	2013
2014	Fiat Palio	Volkswagen Gol	Fiat Strada	Chevrolet Onix	Fiat Uno	Hyundai HB20	Ford Fiesta	Fiat Siena	Volkswagen Fox/Cross	Renault Sandero	2014
2015	Chevrolet Onix	Fiat Palio	Hyundai HB20	Fiat Strada	Ford Ka (Hatch)	Volkswagen Gol	Volkswagen Fox/Cross	Fiat Uno	Renault Sandero	Chevrolet Prisma	2015
2016	Chevrolet Onix	Hyundai HB20	Ford Ka (Hatch)	Chevrolet Prisma	Toyota Corolla	Fiat Palio	Renault Sandero	Volkswagen Gol	Fiat Strada	Honda; HR-V	2016
2017	Chevrolet Onix	Hyundai HB20	Ford Ka (Hatch)	Volkswagen Gol	Chevrolet Prisma	Renault Sandero	Toyota Corolla	Fiat Strada	Fiat Mobi	Fiat Toro	2017
2018	Chevrolet Onix	Hyundai HB20	Ford Ka (Hatch)	Volkswagen Gol	Chevrolet Prisma	Volkswagen Polo	Renault Kwid	Fiat Strada	Fiat Argo	Jeep Compass	2018
2019	Chevrolet Onix	Ford Ka (Hatch)	Hyundai HB20	Renault Kwid	Volkswagen Gol	Fiat Argo	Fiat Strada	Chevrolet Prisma	Volkswagen Polo	Jeep Renegade	2019
2020	Chevrolet Onix (Hatch)	Ford Ka (Hatch)	Hyundai HB20	Chevrolet Onix Plus	Fiat Strada	Volkswagen Gol	Fiat Argo	Volkswagen T-Cross	Jeep Renegade	Fiat Toro	2020
2021	Fiat Strada	Hyundai HB20	Fiat Argo	Jeep Renegade	Chevrolet Onix (Hatch)	Jeep Compass	Fiat Toro	Volkswagen Gol	Fiat Mobi	Hyundai Creta	2021
2022	Fiat Strada	Hyundai HB20	Chevrolet Onix	Chevrolet Onix Plus	Fiat Mobi	Volkswagen Gol	Chevrolet Tracker	Volkswagen T-Cross	Fiat Argo	Jeep Compass	2022
2023	Fiat Strada	Volkswagen Polo†	Chevrolet Onix	Hyundai HB20	Chevrolet Onix Plus	Fiat Mobi	Volkswagen T-Cross	Fiat Argo	Chevrolet Tracker	Hyundai Creta	2023
2024	Fiat Strada	Volkswagen Polo†	Chevrolet Onix	Hyundai HB20	Fiat Argo	Volkswagen T-Cross	Chevrolet Tracker	Hyundai Creta	Fiat Mobi	Nissan Kicks	2024
2025	Fiat Strada	Volkswagen Polo†	Fiat Argo	Volkswagen T-Cross	Hyundai HB20	Chevrolet Onix	Hyundai Creta	Fiat Mobi	Volkswagen Saveiro	Jeep Compass	2025
Year	1st	2nd	3rd	4th	5th	6th	7th	8th	9th	10th	Year
See also: Best-selling models in: Australia; India; Indonesia; Japan; Malaysia; Philippines; Thailand; Sweden

== Motor vehicle manufacturers ==
=== Current passenger automobiles ===
- BMW Group
  - BMW
  - Mini
- Bugre
- BYD
- General Motors do Brasil
  - Chevrolet
- Great Wall Motors
- Grupo CAOA
  - CAOA
  - Chery
    - Exeed
- Grupo CNH Industrial
  - New Holland Agriculture
  - New Holland Construction
- Grupo Gandini
  - Kia Motors
- Volkswagen Group
  - Volkswagen do Brasil
  - Audi do Brasil (Former Audi Senna, an Audi AG subsidiary until 2005)
- Honda
  - Honda Automóveis do Brasil
  - HondaJet (Focused on aircraft engine)
- HPE Automotores do Brasil (Mitsubishi manufacturer)
- Hyundai Motor Brasil
- Jaguar Land Rover
  - Jaguar
  - Land Rover
- Mitsubishi
- Nissan
- Renault do Brasil
- Stellantis
  - Fiat
  - Jeep
  - RAM
  - Peugeot
  - Citroën
- Suzuki
- Toyota
  - Lexus
- Volvo

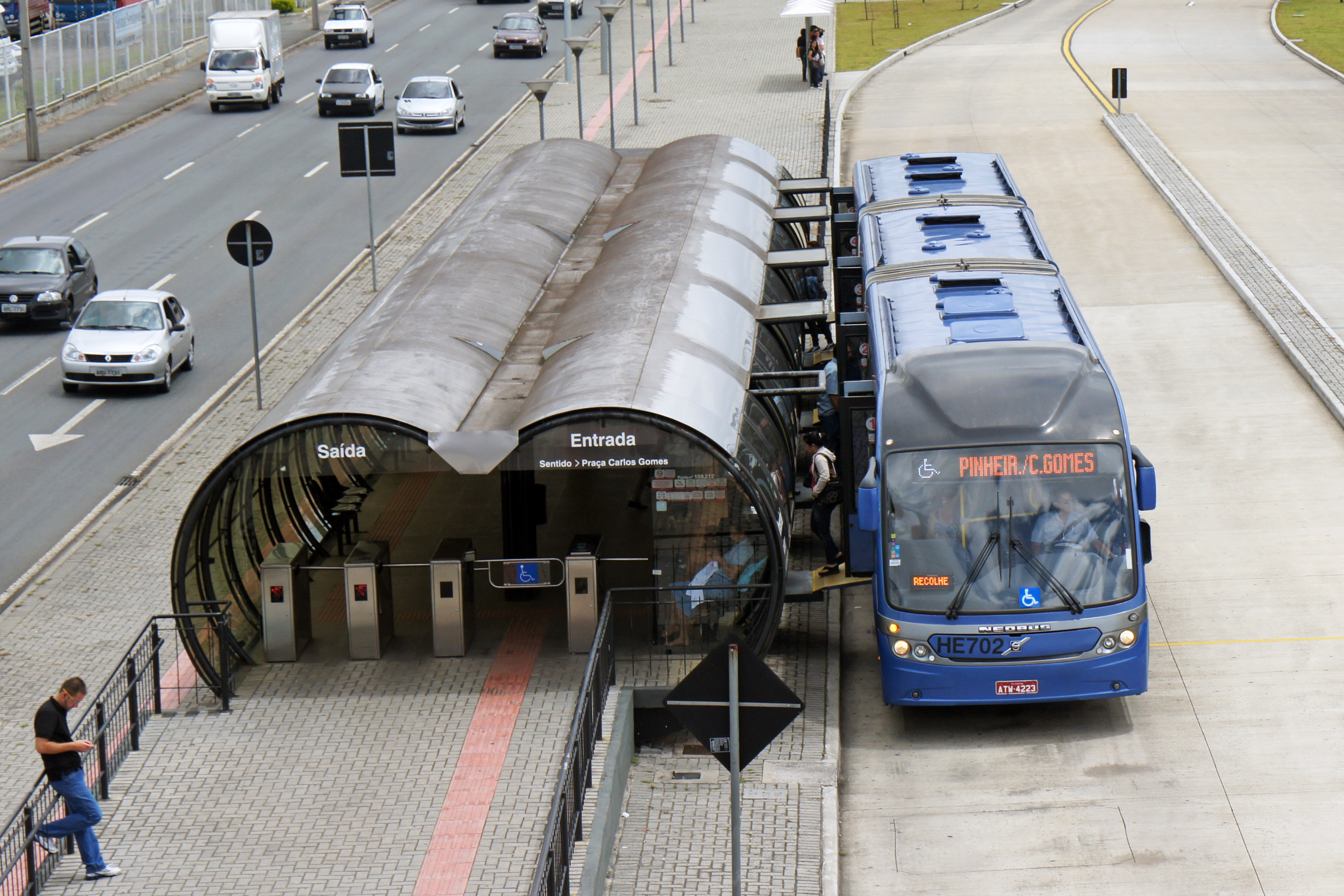
Volvo bus made in Brazil, in the city of Curitiba

=== Motorcycle ===
- Amazonas Motos Especiais (AME)
- Avelloz Motos
- Brasil & Movimento
- BMW
  - BMW Motorrad
- Bombardier Recreational Products (BRP)
- Bull Motors
- CFMoto-KTM
- China South Industries Group
  - Moto Traxx da Amazônia
- Dafra Motos
- Dayang
- Ducati
- HaoJue Motos do Brasil
- Harley-Davidson
- Honda
  - Moto Honda da Amazônia
- Hot Custom Cycles
- HPE Automotores do Brasil (Suzuki representative)
- Iros Motos
- J Toledo Motos do Brasil
  - Suzuki Motos do Brasil
- Kawasaki
- Kymco Motos
- Motocargo Industria e Comercio de Triciclo (Mtcar)
- Royal Enfield
- Shineray
- Sousa Motos
- Triumph
- Vespa
- Voltz Motors
- Yamaha Motor

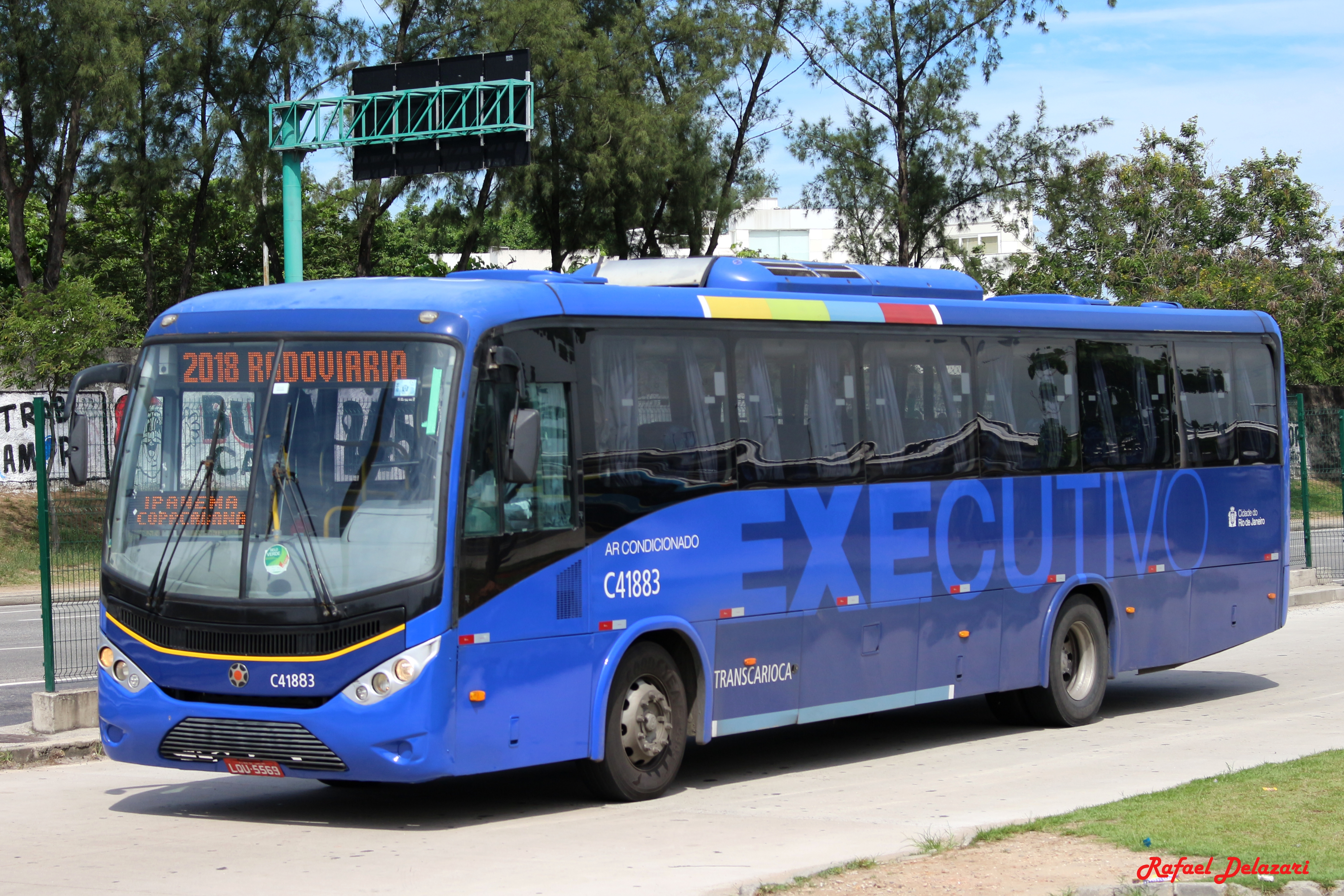
Marcopolo bus made in Brazil, serving the metro area of Belo Horizonte

=== Bus & truck ===
- Agrale
- Avibrás (Military Rocketry Truck)
- BYD Bus
- Caio Indústria e Comércio de Carrocerias (Caio Induscar)
  - Carbuss Indústria Catarinense de Carrocerias (Formerly Busscar Ônibus)
- Comil Ônibus
- DAF Trucks
- Effa Motors
- Foton Trucks
- Fábrica Nacional de Mobilidade (FNM) (Focused in electric semi trucks; not to be confused with Fábrica Nacional de Motores (FNM))
- Iveco
  - Iveco (spun-off from CNH Industrial on 1 January 2022)
  - Iveco Bus
- Marcopolo
  - Neobus
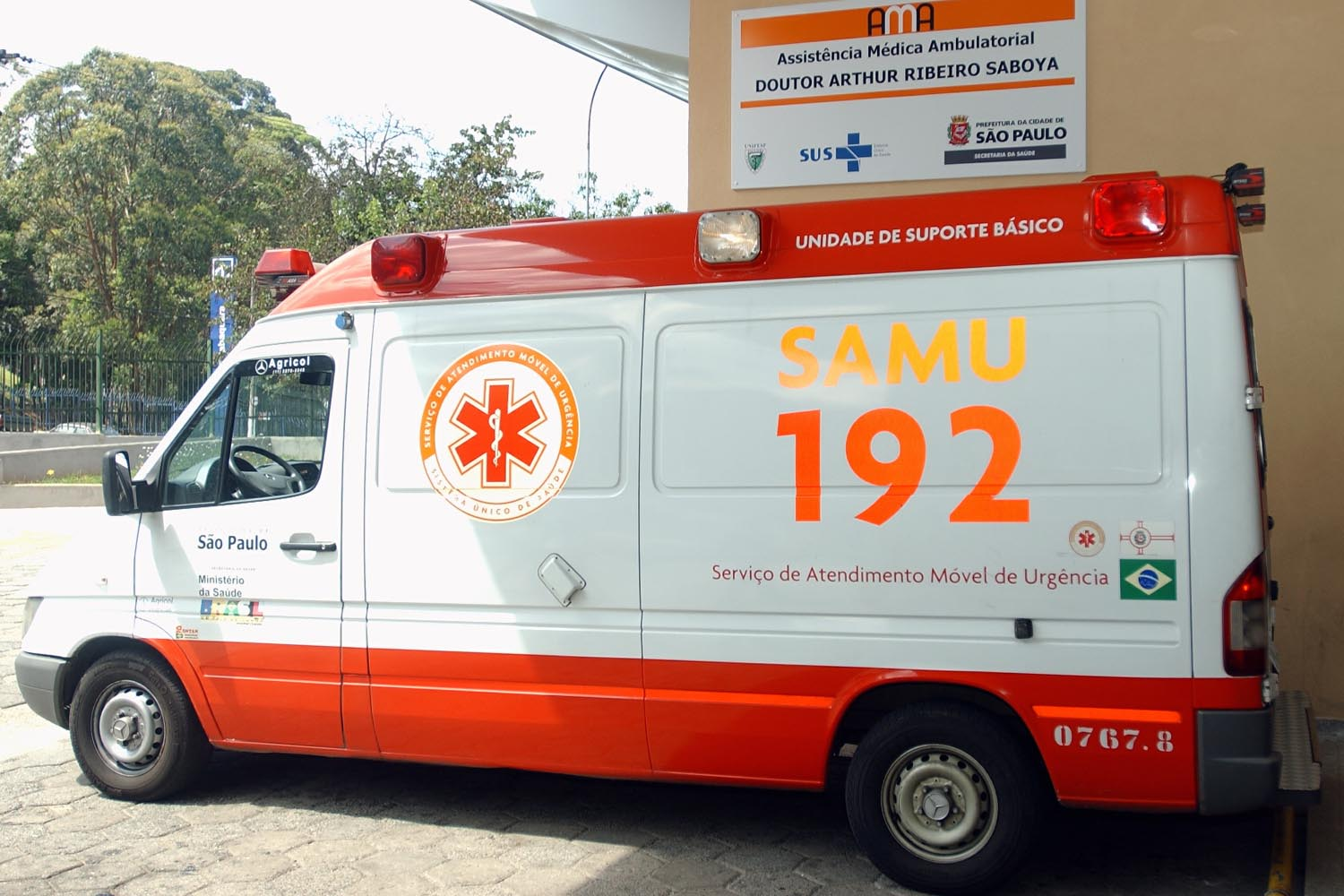
    Mercedes-Benz ambulance, made in Brazil, in the city of São Paulo
- Mercedes-Benz
- Mascarello
- Volkswagen do Brasil
  - Traton (Formerly MAN SE)
  - Volkswagen Caminhões e Ônibus (Some models are rebadged Man trucks)
  - Scania
- Volvo Caminhões e Ônibus

=== Tractors ===
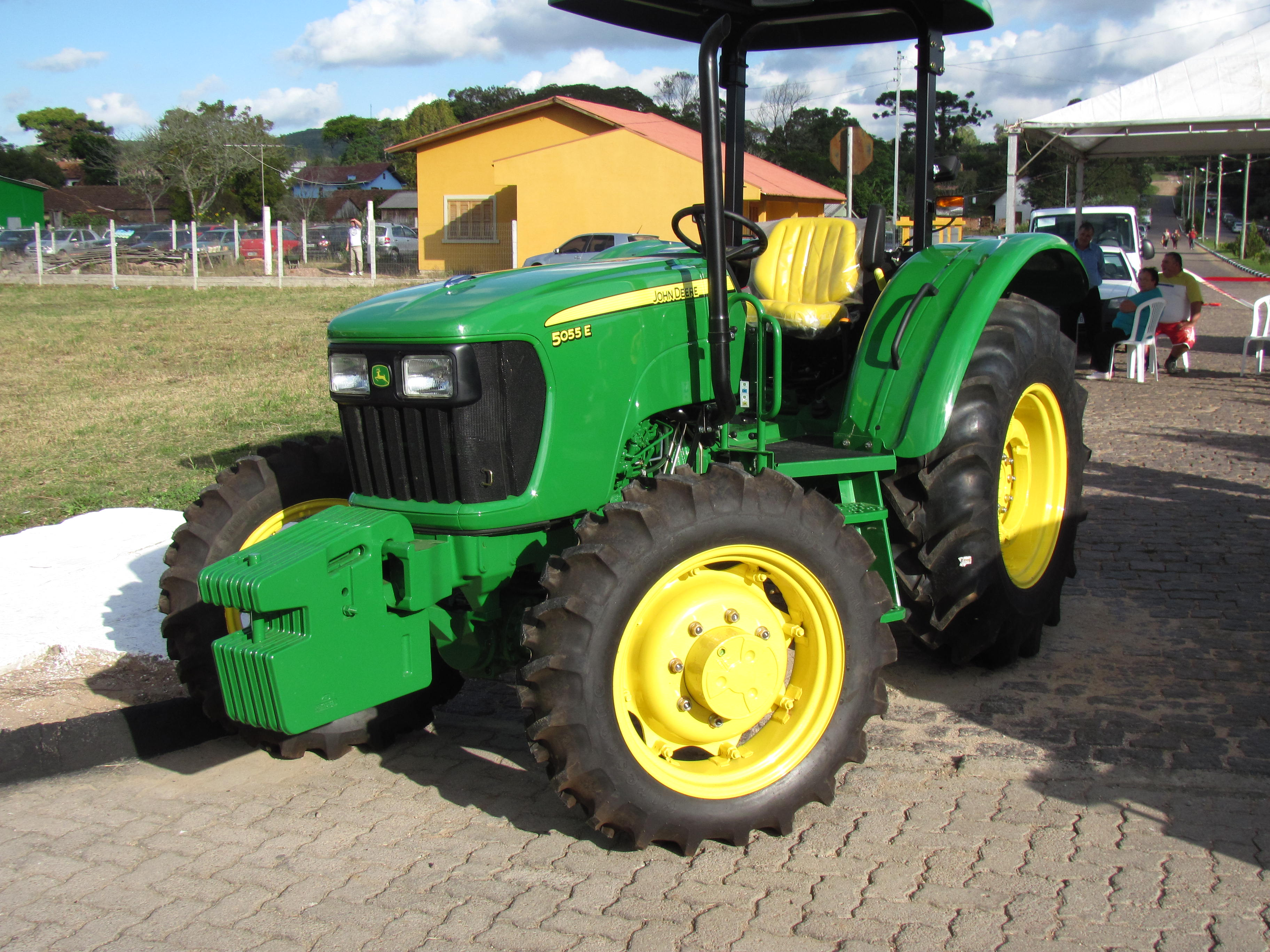
John Deere, agricultural machinery, made in Brazil

- AGCO
- Caterpillar
- Fabral
  - Mahindra
- Fundação Romi
  - Máquinas Agrícolas Romi (Agricultural machinery division)
- Grupo CNH Industrial
  - CASE Construction
  - New Holland Agriculture
  - New Holland Construction
- John Deere
- Komatsu
- Massey Ferguson
- Valtra

=== Representative importers ===
- UK Motors – Grupo Eurobike – Stuttgart Sportcar
  - Aston Martin
  - McLaren
  - Porsche
- Via Itália
  - Ferrari
  - Lamborghini
  - Maserati
  - Rolls-Royce

=== Former local and foreign manufacturers ===
- Agrale (Motorcycle division)
- Alfa Romeo
- Athena Auto (Partnership between Fibracar Compósitos and Scherer Automotiva)
- Athos Cars (Formerly Chamonix Athos)
- AutoLatina (Former VWB & Ford Joint-Venture)
- Automotiva Usiminas (Formerly Brasinca; manufactured car body, dump container and crew-cabs for companies such as Ford, Mercedes-Benz, Toyota, Simca, Scania, Massey Ferguson, Volkswagen, Volvo, Chevrolet and FNM, between 1950s and mid-1990s)
- Benelli
- Bernardini (Military)
- CBT, Companhia Brasileira de Tratores
- Companhia Distribuidora Geral Brasmotor (Former manufacturer for Chrysler, Plymouth, Fargo and Volkswagen. Currently owned by Whirlpool, produces since only refrigerators)
- CBP Indústria, Comércio e Exportação (Closed due to trademark infringement; bought Coyote Indústria e Comércio, a former autocross vehicle manufacturer, in the late 80s)
- Chrysler & Dodge
- Distribuidora de Automóveis, Caminhões e Ônibus Nacionais (Dacon) (Volkswagen and Porsche Representative, Custom Builder) Projets d'AvantGarde (PAG DACON)
- Fabral
- Emis Indústria e Comércio de Veículos
- Engenheiros Especializados (Engesa, manufactured Military Vehicles, Trucks And Agricultural Tractors)
- Farus Indústria de Veículos Esportivos
- Ford
  - Troller
- FNM Fábrica Nacional de Motores
- Busscar Buses
- Grupo Souza Ramos, aka Ford Souza Ramos Seller, made Custom Vehicles
- Gurgel Indústria e Comércio de Veículos (Formerly Moplast Moldagem de Plástico)
- Hofstetter Indústria e Comércio de Veículos
- Indústria Brasileira de Automóveis Presidente (IBAP)
- Indústria Brasileira de Veículos (IBV)
- Indústria de Carrocerias Bugre
- JAC Motors
- JPX Indústria e Comércio (Founded by Eike Batista)
- Karmann-Ghia do Brasil (Subsidiary of Wilhelm Karmann)
- Kasinski (Currently under Magneti Marelli brand, a Fiat subsidiary), Cofap – Companhia Fabricadora de Peças, Cofave – Sociedade Amazonense Fabricadora de Veículos
- Kers Tecnologia em Mobilidade Sustentável (Microenterprise supported by Unioeste University and the government of the State of Parana)
- LHM Indústria Mecânica (Formerly Nurburgring Indústria e Comércio)
- Lafer (Ceased passenger vehicles production in 1990, but still producing Furniture until 2022)
- Lifan
- Little Croc (Amphibious buggy)
- Lobby Indústria e Comércio (Formerly Matis Indústria e Comércio)
- L'Auto Craft Montadora de Veículos (Formerly L'Automobile Distribuidora de Veículos)
- Mahindra (Ceased passenger vehicles production in 2015)
- Mafersa, Trains & Bus Manufacturer
- Mercedes-Benz (Ceased passenger vehicles production in 2020, still produce trucks and bus chassis)
- Miura (Currently owned by Rangel & Lima Indústria de Veículos, Formerly owned by Besson, Gobbi & Cia.)
- MMC Automotores do Brasil
- Mobilis (Startup focused in urban mobility solution, produced a small electric vehicle in 2017)
- Montauto – Montadora Nacional de Automóveis, BRM – Buggy Rodas e Motores (Biggest dune buggy manufacturer in Brazil)
- Mundeo (Propeller-driven car built "to simulate the feel of an inverted flight", traffic restriction on public roads)
- Nasser Brasil Motores Indústria e Comércio de Veículos, NBM Indústria, Comércio de Veículos
- Obvio! Automotoveículos
- Vrooom! Veículos Elétricos (Currently active and focused on electric vehicles)
- Pioneira da Indústria Nacional de Automóveis Reunida (Pinar)
- Plascar – (Formerly Oscar S.A. Indústria de Artefatos de Borracha, still plastic bumper supplier)
- Polaris
- Indian Motorcycle
- Puma Automóveis
- Py Motors Comércio e Indústria
- Companhia Industrial Santa Matilde
- SEED (Small Electric Economic Design) (Formerly MMR Motorsport)
- Simca do Brasil (Replaced by Chrysler do Brasil in 1967)
- SR Veículos Especiais
- TAC (Formerly Tecnologia Automotiva Catarinense (TAC); utility car project sold to the Chinese Zotye)
- Tarso Marques Concept (TMC) (Founded by Tarso Marques, former Formula 1 pilot; specialized in custom jobs)
- Vemag-DKW (Vemag was acquired by Volkswagen do Brasil in 1967)
- Viação Cometa (Currently owned by Auto Viação 1001)
- Companhia Manufatureira Auxiliar (CMA), Produced Cometa Buses)
- Viação Itapemirim as Tecnobus – Serviços, Comércio e Indústria (Formerly Tecnobus Implementos Rodoviários)
- VLEGA Gaucho
- Willys-Overland do Brasil
- Wladimir Martins Veículos (WMV) (Sold to Polystilo Indústria e Comércio in 1983 and for Py Motors in 1986)

==== Educational institutions ====
- Escola de Engenharia de São Carlos (EESC-USP)
- Faculdade de Engenharia Industrial (FEI)
- Instituto Mauá de Tecnologia

=== Local manufacture encouraged ===
As of 2024, Brazil has a 35% tariff on imported combustion engine vehicles, 18% on BEVs, 20% on PHEVs and 25% on HEVs — which will progressively rise to 35% by june 2026. A link to a map containing all plants currently in Brazil:

== Passenger vehicles currently offered, manufactured or imported in large scale ==
Agrale: Marruá

Audi: Q3/Q3 Sportback; Imported: A3, A4, A5, A6, A8, Q5, Q7, Q8, RS, e-tron and e-tron GT

BMW: 3 Series, X1, X3, X4, X5; Imported: 1 Series, 2 Series, 4 Series, 5 Series, 7 Series, X2, X6, X7, Z4 and iX

BYD: Dolphin Mini, Song Pro, King; Imported: Atto 8, Dolphin, Han, Seal, Sealion 7, Shark, Song Plus, Tang, Yuan, Yuan Plus and Yuan Pro

Chery: Tiggo 5x Pro, Tiggo 7 Pro, Tiggo 8; Imported: iCar, Arrizo 6 Pro and Tiggo 8 Pro Plug-in Hybrid

Chevrolet: Onix/Onix Plus, Montana, Sonic, Spin, Tracker, S10, Trailblazer, Imported: Blazer EV, Equinox, Spark EUV, Captiva EV, and Silverado

Citroën: Basalt, C3, C3 Aircross, C4 Cactus; Imported: Jumpy, e-Jumpy, Jumper

Fiat: Argo, Mobi, Pulse, Abarth Pulse, Strada, Toro, Fiorino, Fastback; Imported: 500e, Cronos, Ducato, Scudo, e-Scudo and Titano

Honda: City (Sedan and Hatchback), HR-V, WR-V; Imported: Accord, Civic, CR-V and ZR-V

Hyundai: Creta, HB20/HB20S; Imported: i20, IONIQ 5, Kona Hybrid, Palisade

Jeep: Avenger, Commander, Compass, Renegade; Imported: Gladiator and Wrangler

Land Rover: —; Imported: Land Rover Discovery, Range Rover Evoque, Defender and Velar

Mitsubishi: L200 Triton, Eclipse Cross; Imported: Pajero Sport

Nissan: Kait, Kicks; Imported: Frontier and Versa

Peugeot: Partner Rapid; Imported: 208, e-208, 2008, e-2008, 3008, Expert, e-Expert and Boxer

Ram: Rampage; Imported: 1500, 1500 Classic and 2500

Renault: Duster, Kardian, Oroch, Logan, Kwid, Sandero, Master; Imported: Kangoo, Kwid E-Tech, Mégane E-Tech and Zoe

Toyota: Corolla, Corolla Cross, Yaris (Sedan and Hatchback); Imported: Hilux, SW4 and RAV4

Volkswagen: Nivus, Polo Track, Saveiro, T-Cross, Tera, Virtus; Imported: Amarok, Golf GTI, ID.4, ID.Buzz, Jetta GLI, Polo, Taos and Tiguan R-Line

== See also ==
- Brazilian Highway System
- Ethanol fuel in Brazil
- FENABRAVE
- Infrastructure of Brazil
- List of automobiles manufactured in Brazil
- List of exports of Brazil
- Transport in Brazil
