= List of Latin American automobile manufacturers =

This is a list of notable automobile manufacturers with articles on Wikipedia by country. It is a subset of the list of automobile manufacturers for manufacturers based in South America. It includes companies that are in business as well as defunct manufacturers.

== Brazil ==
- Agrale (1962)
- BMW Brazil (2014)
- Caterpillar Brazil (1960)
- Chamonix (1987)
- Comil (1985)
- Effa Brazil (2006)
- Fabral (2002)
- Fiat Automóveis (1976)
- Ford Brasil (1919)
  - Troller (1995)
- General Motors do Brasil (1925)
- Honda Brazil (1971)
- Hyundai Brazil (-)
- John Deere Brazil (-)
- Komatsu do Brazil (1975)
- Marcopolo S.A. (1949)
  - Neobus (1999)
- Mascarello (2003)
- Mercedes-Benz Brazil (-)
- MMC Automotores do Brasil (-)
- Nissan Brasil (2001)
- Obvio! (-)
- PSA Peugeot Citroën do Brasil (-)
- Renault do Brasil (1997)
- Scania Latin America (1957)
- TAC (2004)
- Valtra do Brasil (1950s)
- VLEGA (2006)
- Volkswagen do Brasil (1953)
  - Audi Senna (1993)
  - MAN (1995)

== Chile ==
- Citroën Chile (1955)
- Divolvo S.A.(1959, defunct)
- General Motors de Chile (1974)

== Mexico ==
- DINA S.A. (1971)
- Fiat Chrysler Automobiles (1930)
- Mastretta (1987)
- Solana (1936)
- Zacua (2017)

== See also ==
- List of automobile manufacturers
- List of automobile marques
