= Brasil & Movimento =

Brazilian motorcycle manufacturer

- Industry: Motorcycles and automobiles manufacturing and sales
- Founded: 2003; 23 years ago in Barueri
- Defunct: 2011; 15 years ago
- Headquarters: Manaus, Brazil

Brasil & Movimento S.A. or B&M was a Brazilian company that manufactured motorcycles and bicycles beginning in 2000. It sold its products under the Sundown Motors trademark. Wholly Brazilian owned, it employed over 1,000 people and had 54,000 square metres of area over two separate factories. B&M was an ISO 9001/2000 quality standard certification holder.

The company grew and in 2002 started producing cheaper, small-engined motorcycles. In less than three years in this market, it became the third-highest selling brand in Brazil, with 10 models ranging from 90 cc to 250 cc engines.

In China, Brasil & Movimento had a development office where it worked in partnership with two major partners, Qingq and Zongshen.

In mid-2011, due to financial problems among investors, and the Brazilian economic crisis, the factory went bankrupt.
