= Farus =

Overview
- Manufacturer: Farus
- Production: 1979-1990
- Assembly: Belo Horizonte, Brazil

Body and chassis
- Body style: 2-door coupé 2-door convertible
- Layout: MR layout

Powertrain
- Engine: 1,297 cc Fiat SOHC I4; 1,588 cc VW EA827 I4; 1,781 cc VW EA827 I4; 1,796 cc GM Family II I4; 1,984 cc VW EA827 I4; 1,998 cc GM Family II I4; 2,213 cc Chrysler Turbo I I4
- Transmission: 4/5-speed manual

Dimensions
- Wheelbase: 2,400 mm (94.5 in)
- Length: 4,000 mm (157.5 in)
- Width: 1,680 mm (66.1 in)
- Height: 1,100 mm (43.3 in)
- Curb weight: 750–830 kg (1,653–1,830 lb)

The Farus is a mid-engined sports automobile built in Brazil by Industria de Veiculos Esportivos LTDA beginning in 1979. The Farus company, located in the southern Brazilian city of Belo Horizonte, was founded in 1979. The name of the company is a portmanteau of FAmilia RUSso, as the cars were built by Alfio Russo and his son Giuseppe. Their original mid-engined ML and TS cars were followed by the larger Farus Quadro, which was also part of an abortive effort to be sold in the United States. After a change of name to TECVAN (Tecnologia de Vanguarda Ltda., Vanguard Technology Ltd.), the company shut its doors in 1990 as a result of the Plano Collor market liberalization.

The car uses a fiberglass body with two-seats and a mid-mounted engine, either from Volkswagen do Brasil or from Fiat Automóveis. The Fiat-engined car was the first one to appear and has a single overhead cam of 1.3 litres with 72 PS (53 kW) which was also used in the Fiat Spazio TR and Uno SX. It was called the ML 929 to honor the mother of Alfio Russo, Maria Luisa, who was born in 1929. The more powerful TS 1.6 appeared in April 1981 and uses the engine (and badging) from the Volkswagen Passat TS, it has 80 PS (59 kW). Both models have a four-speed manual transmission, but as is the case for their donor cars the TS 1.6 has a longitudinally mounted engine while the ML 929's engine is mounted transversally. In 1984 the Beta appeared, very similar to the TS 1.6 but fitted with 1.8 or 2.0 liter engines from the Chevrolet Monza (a Brazilian-built Opel Ascona C). A year later a convertible version of the Beta was also added to the pricelist. A version of the Beta/Spider, fitted with Chrysler's 2.2 litre "Turbo I" engine, was meant to spearhead Farus' entry into the US market. However, although 1,500 reservations were taken after showing the car at the 1987 New York Auto Show, the investments needed to enter series production were too high and the project ended up cancelled. Meanwhile, the mid-engined Farus' also became available with the 2.0 liter Volkswagen engines (petrol or alcohol) used in the Volkswagen Santana.

The fibreglass body was quite wedgy and reminiscent of both the Lamborghini Urraco and the Fiat X1/9, the well integrated taillight units came from the Volkswagen Voyage sedan. In 1989 the Quadro appeared, a less sleek front-engined four-seater built on Volkswagen Santana underpinnings. After the government of Fernando Collor opened up the Brazilian market to foreign products, Farus were no longer competitive and production had ended by 1990, although some sources state 1992.

== Models ==
Farus Catalogue

- ML-929 - 1978 - 88
- TS - 1982 - 1988
- Beta - 1984 - 1992
- Beta Cabriolet - 1984 - 1992
- Quadro 2000 - 1989 - 1990
