= Voltz (motorcycles) =

Brazilian motorcycle company

- Industry: Motorcycle manufacturing
- Founded: 2017; 9 years ago
- Founder: Renato Villar
- Headquarters: Recife, Pernambuco, Brazil

Voltz, is a Brazilian startup company that produces electric scooters and motorcycles, founded in 2017 in Recife. It has sold more than 4,535 units in 2022, with 0.33% of market share.

According to the National Federation of Motor Vehicle Distribution (FENABRAVE), the company sold 1,629 motorcycles from January to September 2023, down 55.6% from 3,664 on the same period in 2022.

In 2022, Voltz recorded 24,000 reservations, of which 6,000 were actually converted into sales (Note: Corporate sales are usually not included in the annual data) and another 10,000 were canceled. During the pandemic, the company had reached the top 5 in sale figures, it now ranks only 13th, with a market share of 0.14%.

A factory was opened in Manaus (AM) in May 2022, initially to produce 5000 units, but with a capacity of 15,000 units, targeting an annual production of 180,000 units.

In addition to the four scooter models "EV1", "EVS", "EVS Sport" and "EVS Work" with battery from 32 Ah to 70 Ah and range from 100 km to 180 km, the company produces the electric cargo trike “Miles” with a cargo box with 750 liters capacity located above the front axle.

In 2023, the company admitted that it was going through financial problems and has been accumulating delays in deliveries, but says that the motorcycles sold will be delivered. In addition to an eviction action at the factory in Manaus, the company is involved in several lawsuits and may go into voluntary arrangement.
