= Dafra Motos =

Brazilian motorcycle company

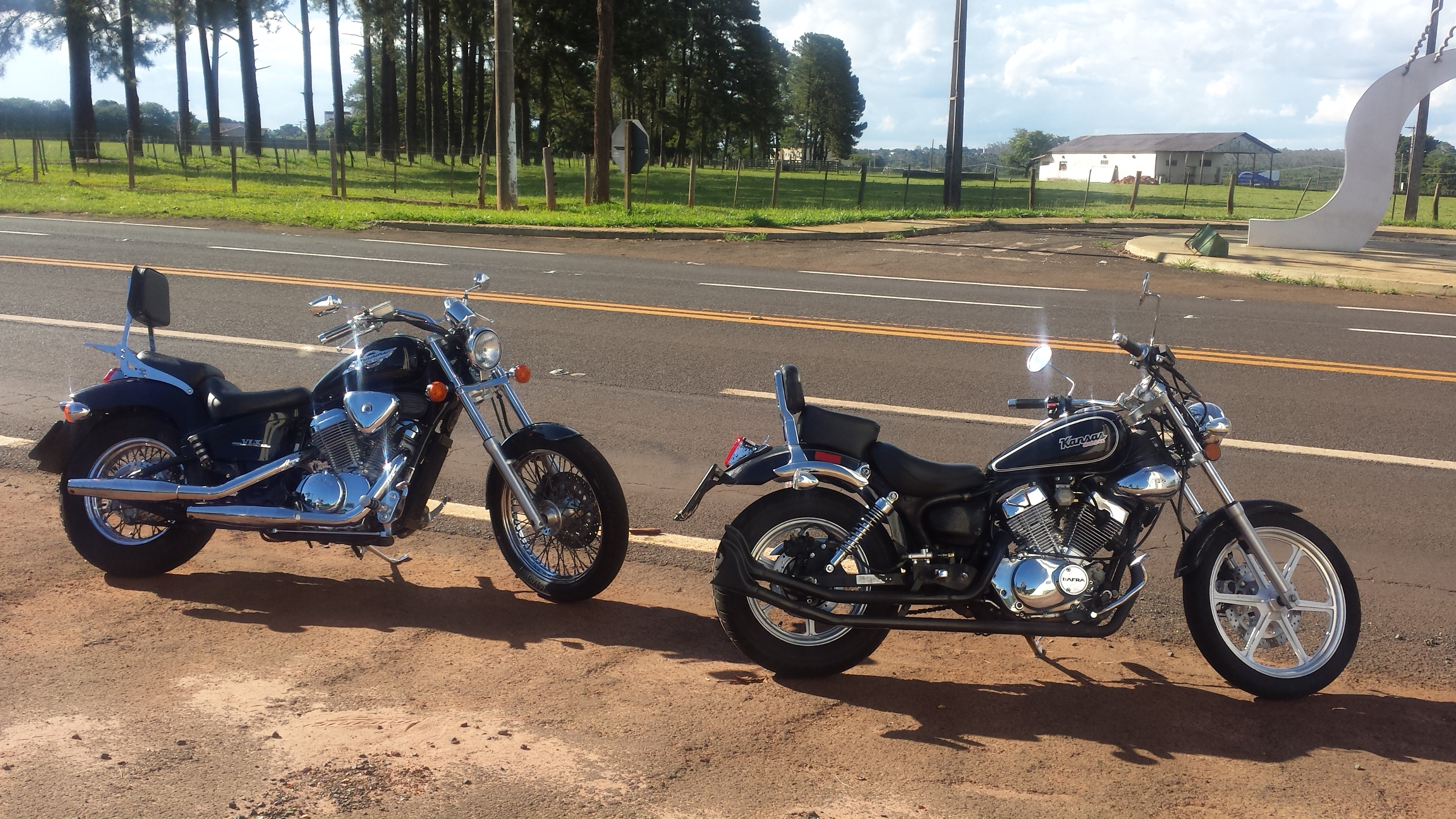
- Honda VT600C (left) with Dafra Kansas 250
- Industry: Motorcycles and automobiles manufacturing and sales
- Founded: 2007; 19 years ago
- Headquarters: Manaus, Brazil
- Parent: Grupo Itavema
- Website: daframotos.com.br

Dafra Motos, or Dafra is a Brazilian builder of motorcycles founded in 2007 by Itavema Group.

== History ==
Dafra Motos was founded in 2007 using the concept "CKD" (completely knocked down) i.e. bringing the disassembled-bikes made by Asian manufacturers Loncin, Lifan and Zongshen and assembling them in Manaus in Brazil, where it maintains its plant.

At the start of production components were overwhelmingly imported from China but after breaking partnership with suppliers, Dafra sought new partners; today Dafra Motorcycles has a partnership with TVS Motor Company of India (third-largest manufacturer of motorcycles in India), Haojue (manufacturer of Suzuki motorcycles in China), BMW, Ducati, MV Agusta, KTM and SYM Motors, seeking improvement of their products.

To meet the domestic market, Dafra built in a factory in the industrial area of Manaus (Amazonas) which has 170,000 m^{2} of land, with 35,000 square meters of buildings. In 2015 The factory had more than 500 employees and an annual production capacity of 200,000 motorcycles.
