= Audi Brasil Distribuidora de Veículos =

Brazilian company

Audi Brasil Distribuidora de Veículos Ltda.
- Formerly: Audi Senna Ltda.
- Company type: Private
- Predecessor: Senna Import
- Founded: 2000
- Headquarters: São Paulo, Brazil
- Area served: Brazil
- Products: Automobiles
- Services: Car distribution
- Parent: Audi AG
- Website: www.audi.com.br

Audi Brasil Distribuidora de Veículos is a Brazilian company that imports and distributes Audi cars into Brazil. It was established in 2000 as a joint venture named Audi Senna.

== History ==
In 1993, Audi signed an agreement with Senna Import, a company owned by Formula One driver Ayrton Senna and his family, for importing and selling Audi cars into Brazil. The imports began in 1994.

In December 1999, the Senna family and Audi agreed to the creation of a joint venture. It was established in 2000 as Audi Senna. The Senna family (through Senna Import) owned a 49% stake while the rest was owned by Audi.

In 2005, Audi acquired the Senna stake in the venture, turning it into a wholly owned subsidiary and giving it its present name.
