= Mascarello Carrocerias de Ônibus =

Brazilian bus operator company

Mascarello

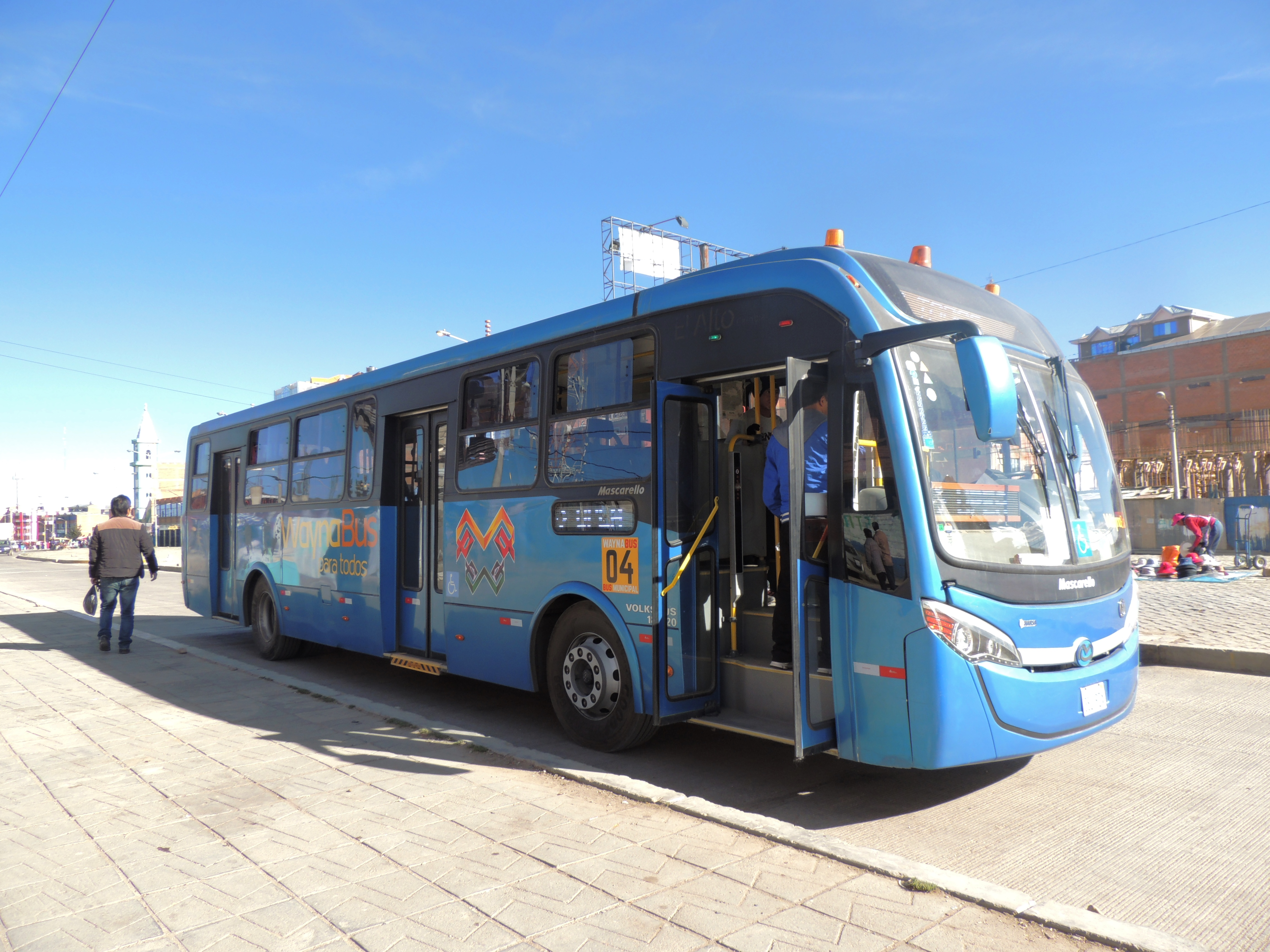
- A Mascarello Granmetro bus in Bolivia
- Type: Sociedade Anônima
- Industry: Automotive
- Founded: 2003
- Founder: Iracele "Celinha" Mascarello
- Headquarters: Cascavel, Brazil
- Area served: Worldwide (Except Philippines, Latin America and Africa)
- Key people: Iracele Mascarello (founder and president)
- Products: Intercity, Urban, Micro and Mini Buses
- Number of employees: 2,000

Mascarello Carrocerias de Ônibus is a Brazilian bus and coach manufacturer based at Cascavel, state of Paraná.

== History ==
The first and only bus builder in the state of Paraná, Mascarello is part of a group of companies linked to the agribusiness sector.

It started its activities producing small models (minibuses) and gradually began to design and assemble larger models. In February 2011, it reached the mark of 10,000 units manufactured, and in May 2013, this number jumped to 15,000 units. Another important moment occurred in September 2011, when the company entered the long distance segment, when it launched the Roma 370 model.

== Markets ==
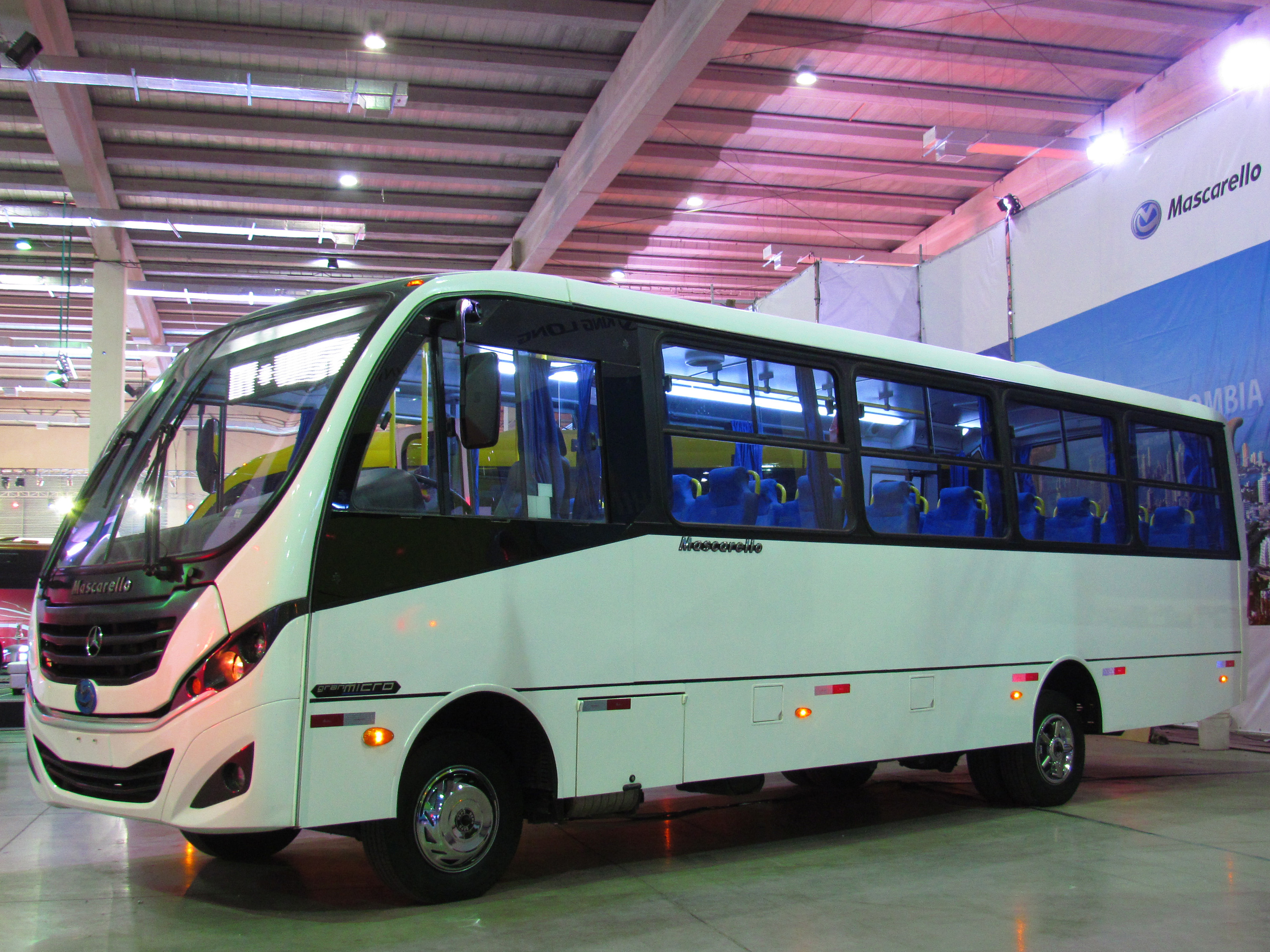
Gran Micro

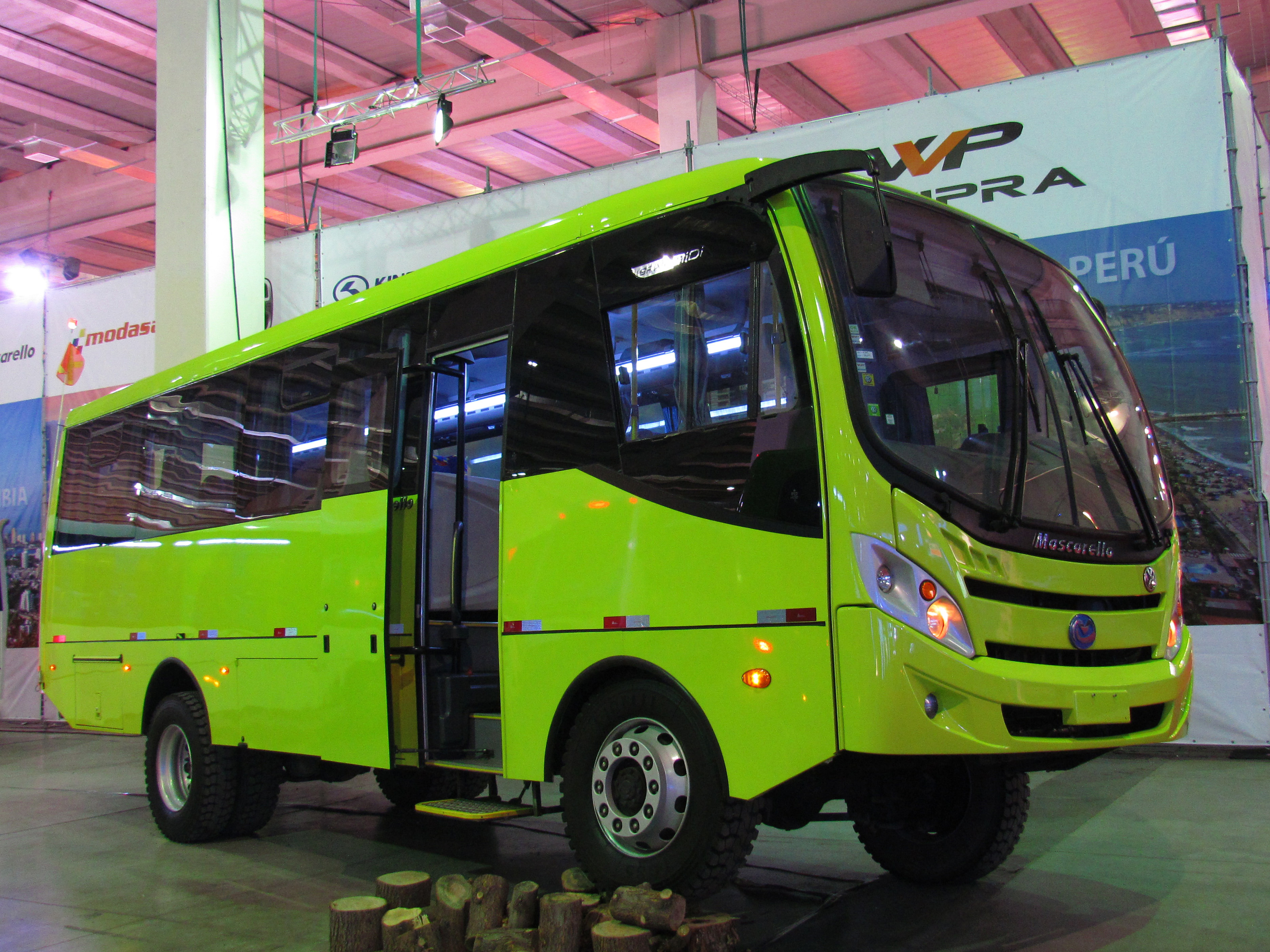
Gran Midi

It serves the domestic market and exports to more than 18 countries, including Philippines, Chile, Ecuador, Venezuela, Costa Rica, Paraguay, and Guatemala in Latin America, as well as Ghana, Angola, and Nigeria in Africa.

== Former models ==
Mini

- Gran Mini 2003 (2003–2007)
- Gran Mini 2007 (2007–2011)

Micro e Midi

- Gran Midi 2005 (2005–2011) 1st Genaration
- Gran Micro 2003 (2003–2010) 1st Generation
- Gran Micro 2010 (2010–2013) 2nd Generation

Urban

- Gran Via 2004 (2004–2008) 1st Generation
- Gran Via 2008 (2008–2011) 2nd Generation
- Gran Via 2011 (2011–2014) 3rd Generation
- Gran Via Articulado (2010–2011)
- Gran Via Low-entry (2004–2011) 1st Generation
- Gran Via Low-entry (2011–2012) 2nd Generation

Road

- Gran Flex (2005–2008)
- Roma MD (2008–2015)
- Roma 310 (2011–2015)
- Roma 330 (2009–2015)
- Roma 350 (2007–2013) 1st Generation
- Roma 350 (2013–2015) 2nd Generation
- Roma 370 (2011–2015)
