= Fabral =

Fabral (full name: Fábrica Brasileira de Automóveis Ltda, or "the Brazilian Car Factory") was an off-road vehicle manufacturer based in Palmas, Tocantins, Brazil. Fabral was established in 2002 with money from the Mozambiquean Tricôs group. The project never got off the ground and the company closed down in 2003.

The company's first president was Abdul Majid Ibraimo. They depended on tax breaks provided by the government of the state of Tocantins where the company is located.

Fabral planned to produce the Santana Jalapão and Santana Anibal in 2003, both based on Santana PS-10 vehicles by Spain's Santana Motors, which themselves are based on the Land Rover Defender. This was aimed at replacing the defunct Toyota Bandeirante off-roader in the marketplace, with the aim of receiving government orders. Other vehicles planned include a Tata double-cab pickup truck and a South Korean bus. Their products were intended to be sold through Ssangyong dealerships, as these also belong to the Tricôs group.
