= Comil =

Automotive business

Comil Carrocerias e Ônibus Ltda
- Formerly: Indústria de Carrocerias Erechim
- Industry: Automotive
- Founded: 1985 (as Indústria de Carrocerias Erechim); 2000 as (Comil Carrocerias e Ônibus Ltda)
- Founder: Families Corradi and Mascarello
- Headquarters: Erechim, Rio Grande do Sul, Brazil
- Area served: Worldwide
- Key people: Deoclécio Corredi (President)
- Products: Bus and coach bodies
- Website: www2.comilonibus.com.br

Comil Carrocerias e Onibus is a Brazilian bus and coach manufacturing company established in 1985 with the purchase of the bus company Incasel. Based in Erechim, Rio Grande do Sul, Brazil, it also has a factory in Mexico. Its products had been exported to 29 countries. Comil also manufactures grain storage buildings and equipment, and had abandoned the bus manufacturing business for two years. In 2002, Comil resumed bus production.
