= List of flexible-fuel vehicles by car manufacturer =

This is a historic list of flexible-fuel vehicles by car manufacturer in alphabetical order:

== Audi ==
Audi offers the following FFV (E85) models (at least in Sweden, Benelux, France, Germany and Switzerland ):

- Audi A3 1.6e e-power E85 102 bhp
- Audi A4 2.0 TFSI flexible fuel 180 bhp
- Audi A5 2.0
- Audi Allroad 2.0
- Audi Q5 2.0

== Citroën ==
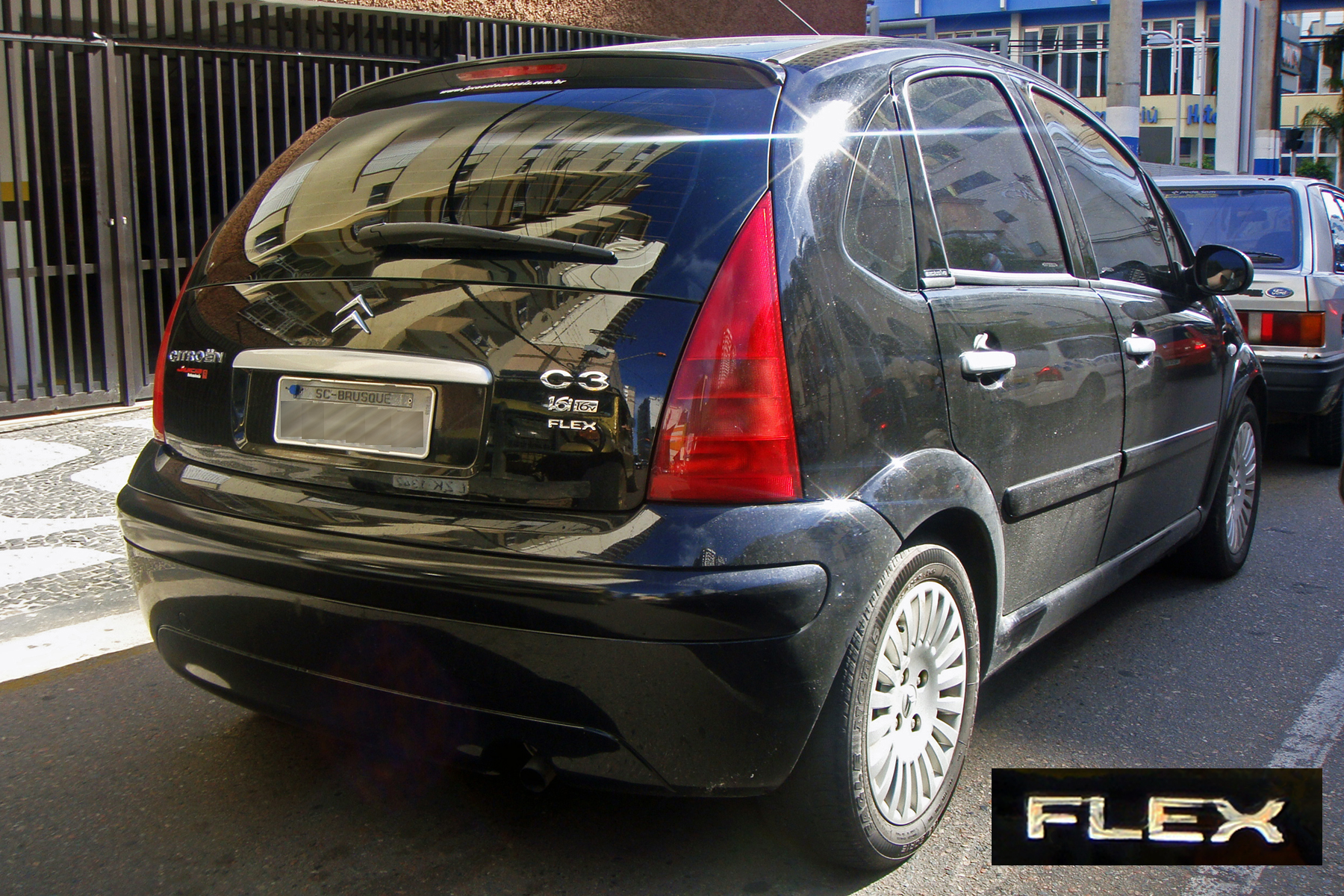
Citroën C3 flexible-fuel (Brazilian version),

Citroën offers the following FFV (E85) models (at least in Sweden, Benelux, France and Switzerland):

- Citroën C3 Flex (E100 - Brazil)
- Citroën C4 1,6/2,0 BioFlex
- Citroën C5 2,0 BioFlex

== Dacia ==
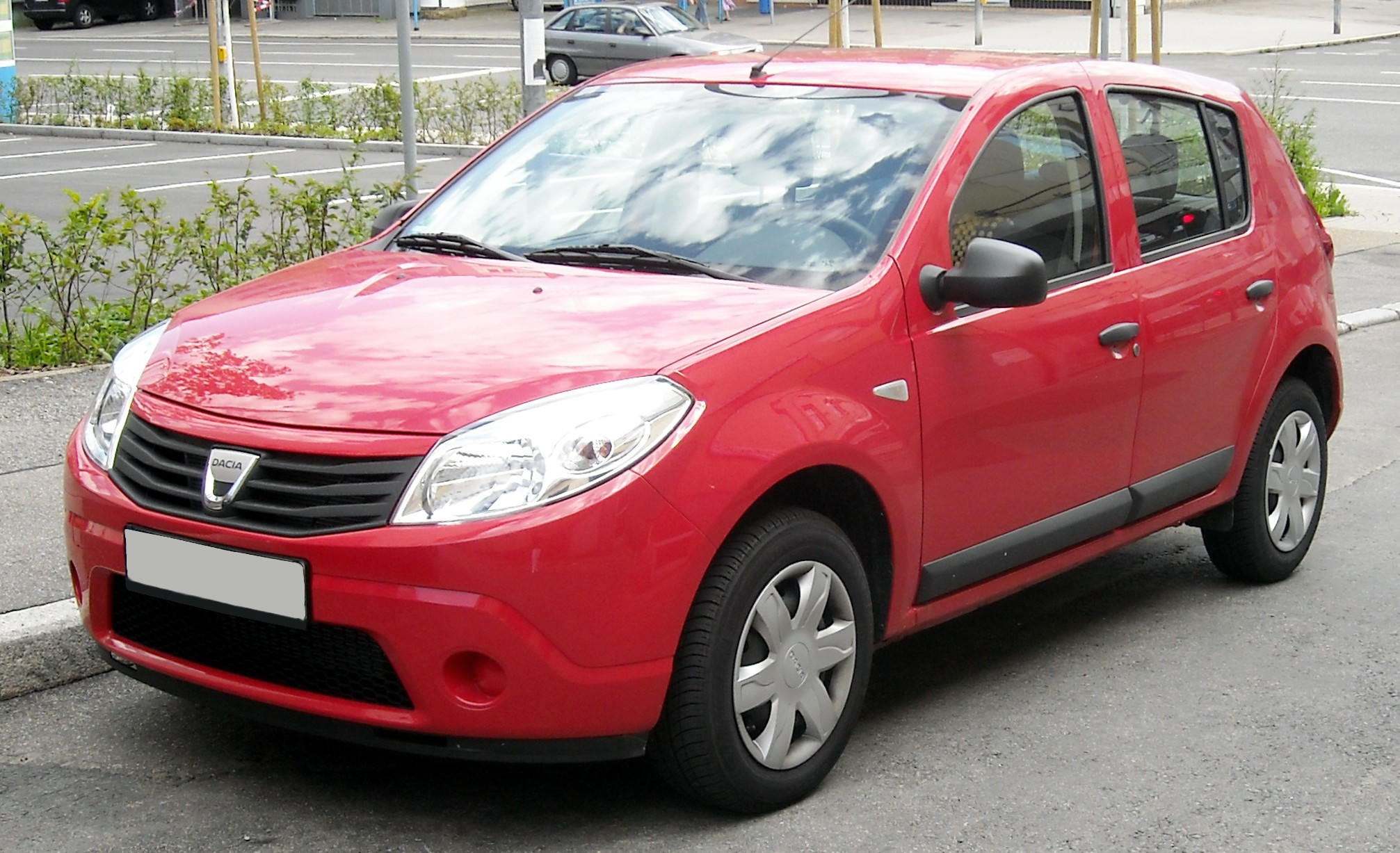
All petrol driven Dacia Sanderos sold in Sweden are FlexFuel.

Dacia offers the following E85 models (at least in Sweden):

- Dacia Duster 1.6 16v (E85) 4x2
- Dacia Logan MCV 1.6 16v Hi-Flex (E85)
- Dacia Sandero 1.6 16v Hi-Flex (E85)

== Ford, GM, And Chrysler ==
Ford, GM, and Chrysler offer the following vehicles in the US that use E85 (different models are available outside the US, depending on the country). For 2018-2025, all Flex Fuel Vehicles available for sale are listed.

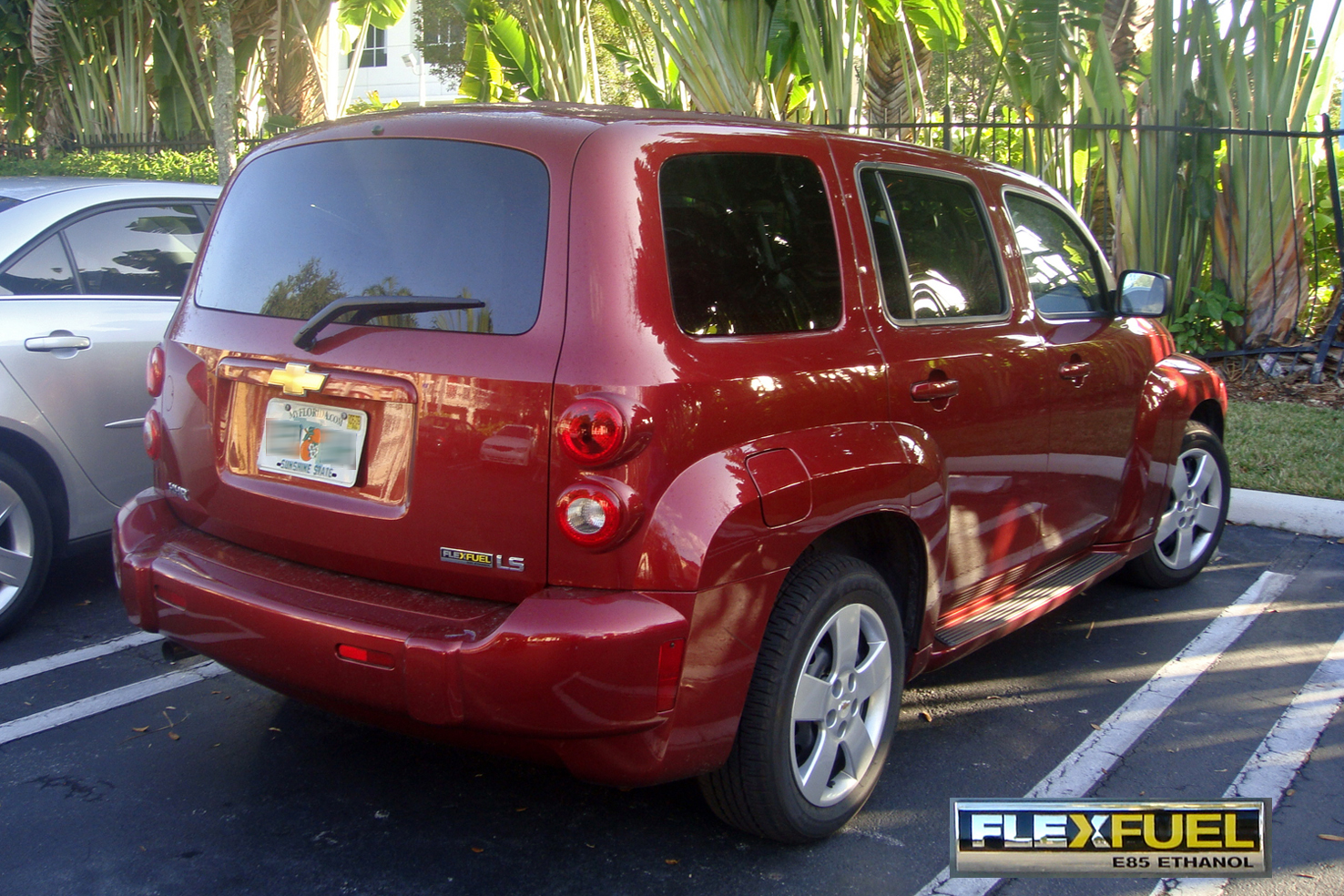
E85 FlexFuel Chevrolet HHR LS 2009 (USA).

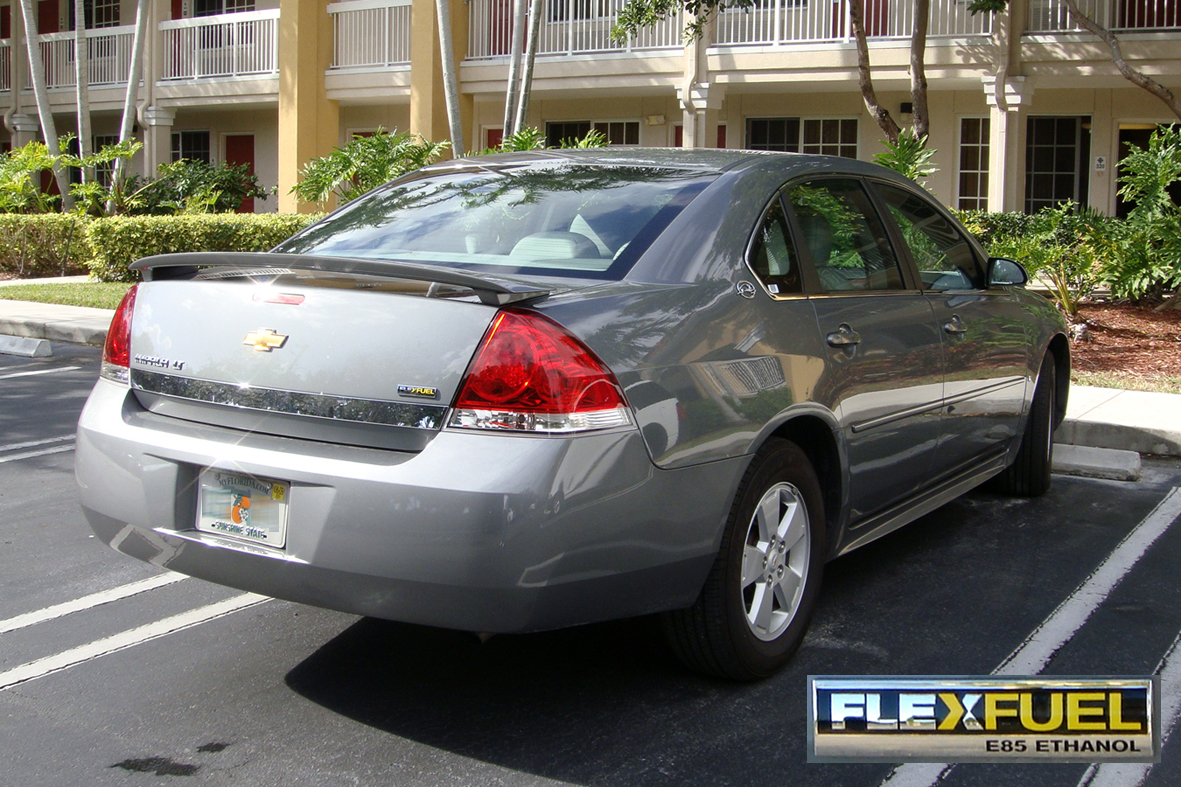
E85 FlexFuel Chevrolet Impala LT 2009 (USA).

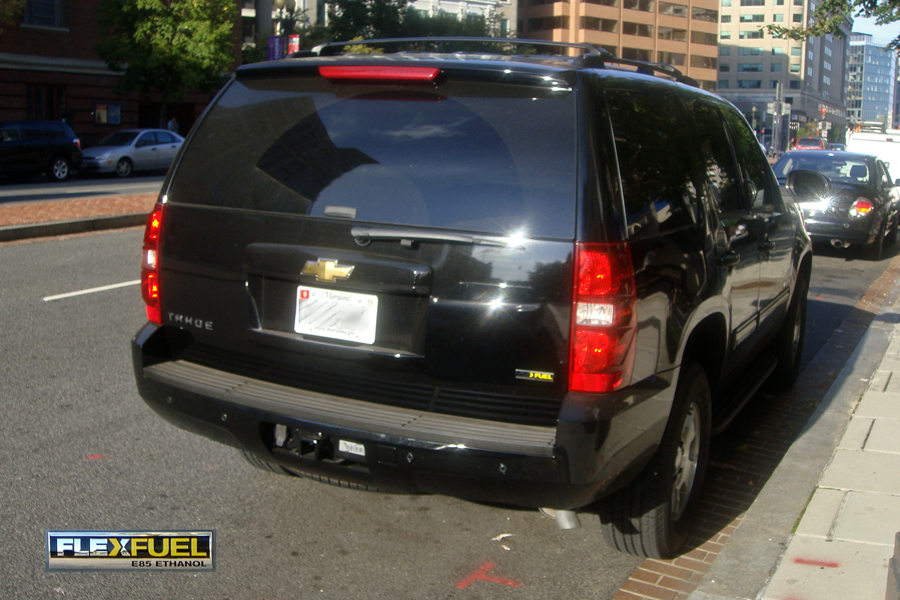
U.S. E85 FlexFuel Chevrolet Tahoe.

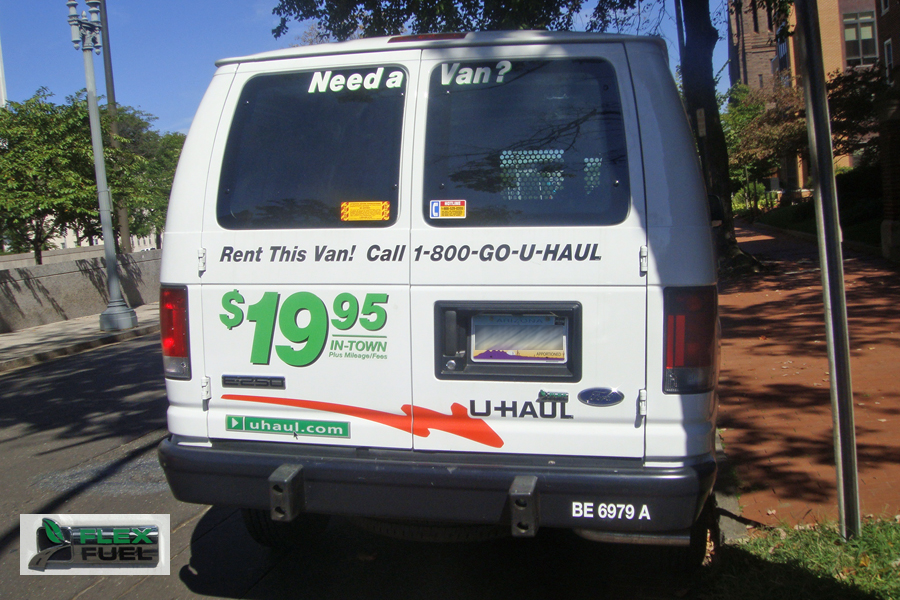
Ford E85 Flexfuel E-250 van.

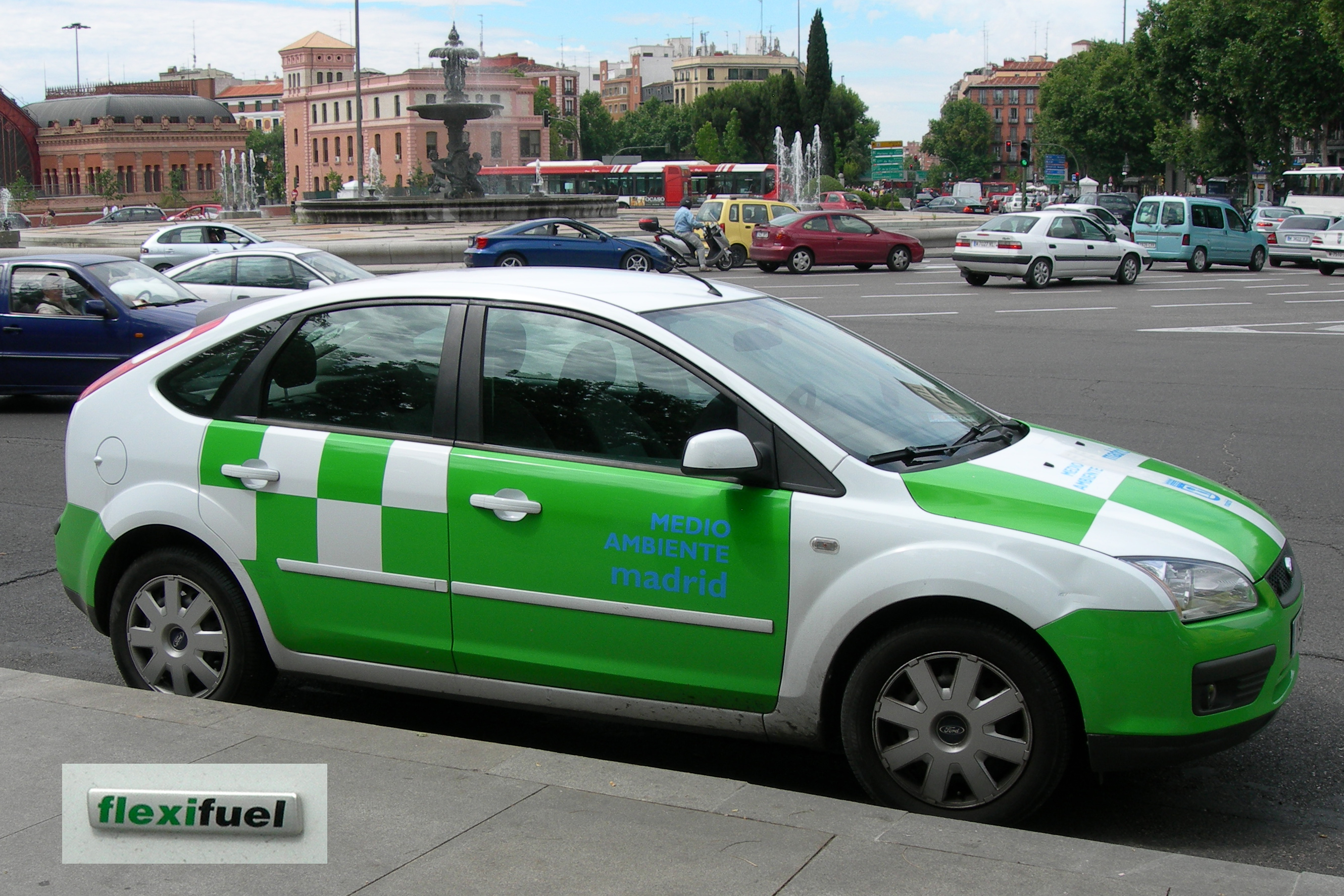
The Ford Focus Flexifuel was the first E85 available in Europe.

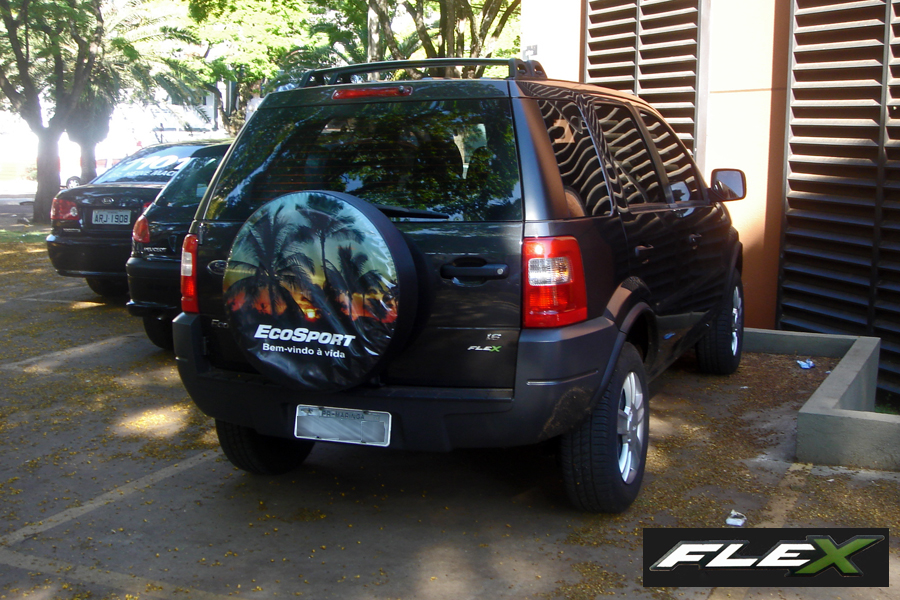
Ford EcoSport Flex (Brazilian version).

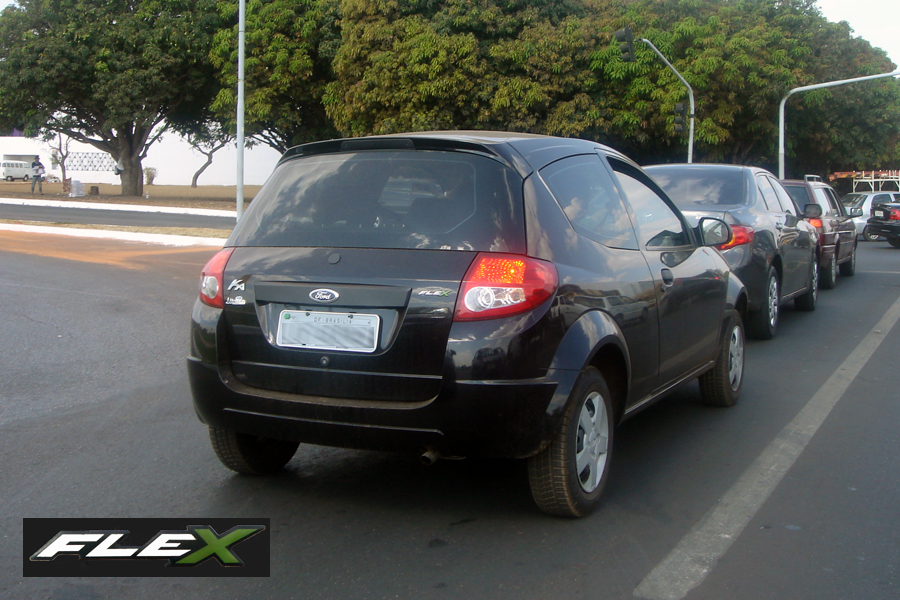
Ford Ka Flex (Brazilian version).

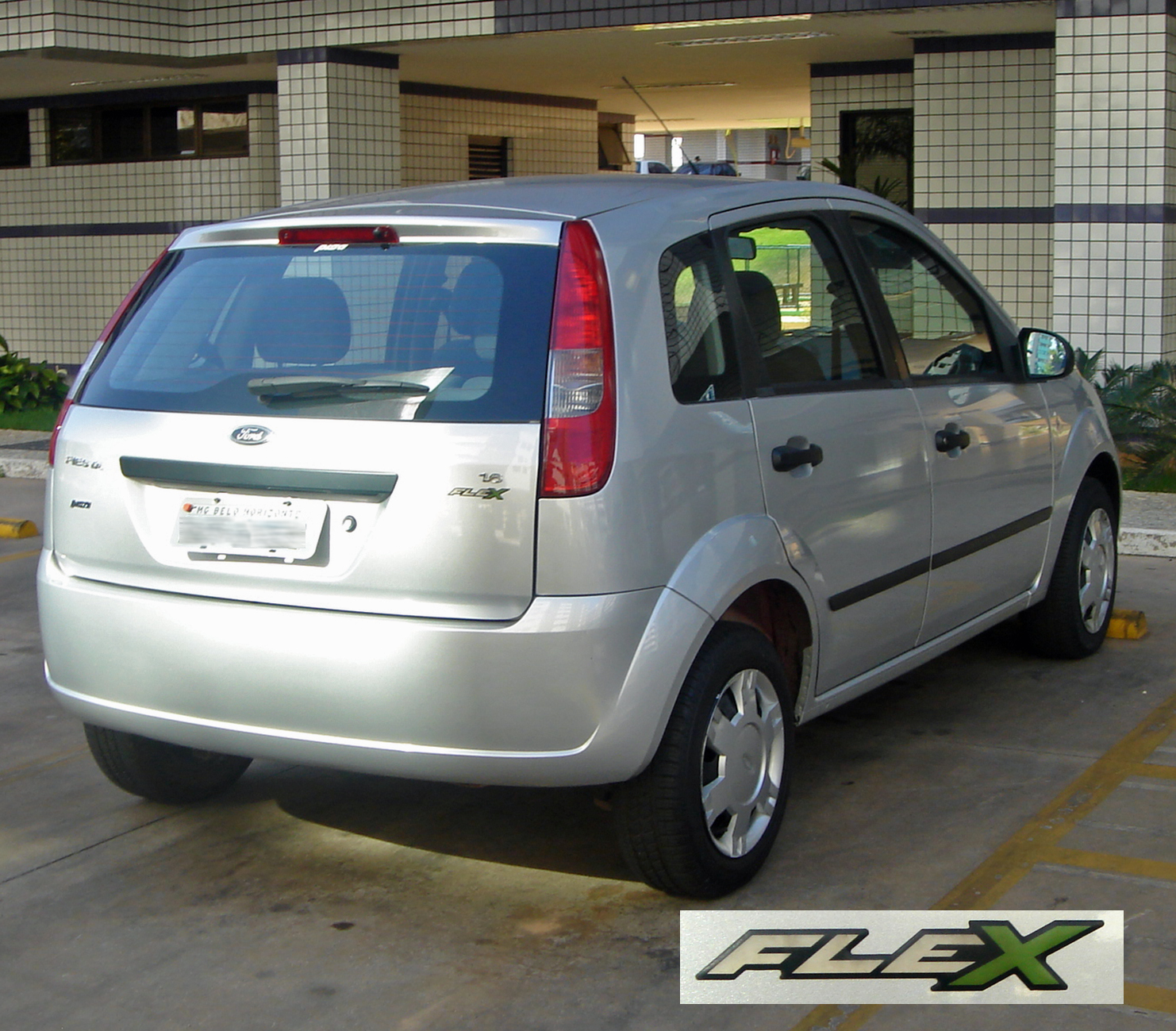
Ford Fiesta Flex (Brazilian version).

2025

- 1.2L Chevrolet Trailblazer & Buick Encore GX
- 1.2L Chevrolet Trax & Buick Envista
- 5.3L Chevrolet Silverado & GMC Sierra

2024

- 3.3L Ford Explorer
- 5.3L Chevrolet Silverado & GMC Sierra

2023

- 3.3L Ford F150 Pickup
- 3.3L Ford Explorer
- 5.0L Ford F150 Pickup
- 5.3L Chevrolet Silverado & GMC Sierra
- 6.2L Dodge Challenger SRT Demon 170

2022

- 2.0L Ford Transit Connect Wagon
- 2.0L Ford Transit Connect Van
- 3.3L Ford F150 Pickup
- 3.3L Ford Explorer
- 3.5L Ford Transit T150
- 5.3L Chevrolet Silverado & GMC Sierra

2021

- 2.0L Ford Transit Connect Wagon
- 2.0L Ford Transit Connect Van
- 3.3L Ford F150 Pickup
- 3.3L Ford Explorer
- 3.5L Ford Transit T150
- 5.3L Chevrolet Silverado & GMC Sierra

2020

- 2.0L Ford Transit Connect Wagon
- 2.0L Ford Transit Connect Van
- 3.3L Ford F150 Pickup
- 3.3L Ford Explorer
- 3.5L Ford Transit T150
- 3.6L Chevrolet Impala
- 5.3L Chevrolet Tahoe & GMC Yukon
- 5.3L Chevrolet Suburban & GMC Yukon XL
- 5.3L Chevrolet Silverado & GMC Sierra

2019

- 2.0L Ford Transit Connect Wagon
- 2.0L Ford Transit Connect Van
- 2.5L Ford Escape
- 3.3L Ford F150 Pickup
- 3.5L Ford Explorer
- 3.5L Ford Transit T150
- 3.5L Ford Taurus
- 3.6L Chevrolet Impala
- 3.6L Chrysler 300
- 3.6L Dodge Charger
- 3.6L Dodge Caravan
- 3.6L Dodge Journey
- 3.6L Ram 1500
- 5.3L Chevrolet Tahoe & GMC Yukon
- 5.3L Chevrolet Suburban & GMC Yukon XL
- 5.3L Chevrolet Silverado & GMC Sierra

2018

- 2.0L Ford Transit Connect Wagon
- 2.0L Ford Transit Connect Van
- 2.4L Jeep Renegade
- 2.4L Jeep Cherokee
- 2.5L Ford Escape
- 3.3L Ford F150 Pickup
- 3.5L Ford Explorer
- 3.5L Ford Transit T150
- 3.5L Ford Taurus
- 3.6L Chevrolet Impala
- 3.6L Chrysler 300
- 3.6L Dodge Charger
- 3.6L Dodge Caravan
- 3.6L Dodge Journey
- 3.6L Ram 1500
- 5.3L Chevrolet Tahoe & GMC Yukon
- 5.3L Chevrolet Suburban & GMC Yukon XL
- 5.3L Chevrolet Silverado & GMC Sierra

2013

- 3.6L Dodge Journey
- 2.0 L Focus

2012

- 2.0L Ford Focus (Late Model year addition)
- 3.6L Chevrolet Impala

2011

- 2.0L Buick Regal CXL Turbo
- 3.0L Ford Escape v6

2010

- 3.0L Ford Fusion and Mercury Milan
- 3.0L Ford Escape and Mercury Mariner
- 2.4L Chevrolet Malibu
- 3.9L Chevrolet Impala LTZ

2009

- 2.2L & 2.4L Chevrolet HHR
- 4.6L Ford E-Series Van
- 5.4L Ford E-Series Van
- 5.4L Ford Expedition
- 5.4L Ford Expedition EL/Max
- 5.4L Lincoln Navigator
- 5.4L Lincoln Navigator L
- 3.5L Pontiac G6

2008

- 2.7L Dodge Avenger
- 5.3L V8 Chevrolet Silverado
- 5.3L V8 Chevrolet Tahoe
- 5.3L V8 Chevrolet Suburban
- 5.3L V8 Chevrolet Avalanche
- 3.5L V6 Chevrolet Impala
- 5.3L V8 Chevrolet Express
- 3.9L V6 Chevrolet Uplander

2007

- Impala
- 5.3L Chevrolet Silverado
- 4.6L Ford Crown Victoria (2-valve, excluding taxi and police units)
- 5.4L Ford F-150 (3-valve)
- 5.3L GMC Sierra (LMG V8)
- 4.6L Lincoln Town Car (2-valve)
- 4.6L Mercury Grand Marquis
- 4.7L Dodge Durango
- 4.7L Dodge Ram Pickup 1500 Series
- 4.7L Chrysler Aspen
- 4.7L Jeep Commander
- 4.7L Jeep Grand Cherokee
- 4.7L Dodge Dakota
- 3.3L Dodge Caravan, Grand Caravan and Caravan Cargo
- 2.7L Chrysler Sebring Sedan

2006

- 3.0L Ford Taurus sedan and wagon (2-valve)*
- 4.6L Ford Crown Victoria (2-valve, excluding taxi and police units)
- 5.4L Ford F-150 (3-valve. Available in December 2005)
- 4.6L Lincoln Town Car (2-valve)
- 4.6L Mercury Grand Marquis

2004–2005

- 4.0L Explorer Sport Trac
- 4.0L Explorer (4-door)
- 3.0L Taurus sedan and wagon (2-valve)

2002–2004

- 4.0L Explorer (4-door)
- 3.0L Taurus sedan and wagon
- 3.3L Dodge Caravan

2002–2003

- 3.0L Supercab Ranger pickup 2WD

2001

- 3.0L Supercab Ranger pickup 2WD
- 3.0L Taurus LX, SE and SES sedan
- 3.3L Chrysler Voyager

1999 and 2000

- 3.0L Ranger pickup 4WD and 2WD
- 3.0L Taurus LX, SE and SES sedan

Many 1995–98 Taurus 3.0L Sedans are also FFVs

Note: * denotes fleet purchase only

== Ford of Europe ==
Ford of Europe offers the following FFV (E85) models (at least in Sweden, Benelux, France, Germany, Switzerland, Spain, and Finland):

- Ford Focus Flexifuel FFV
- Ford C-Max Flexifuel FFV
- Ford Mondeo Flexifuel FFV
- Ford S-Max Flexifuel FFV
- Ford Galaxy Flexifuel FFV

== Ford Brazil ==
Ford do Brasil offers the following vehicles in the Brazilian market under the label "Flex". These vehicles, are capable of running on any blend from E20-E25 to E100

- Ford Courier pickup
- Ford EcoSport
- Ford Fiesta
- Ford Focus
- Ford Ka
- Ford Ranger pickup..

== Fiat ==
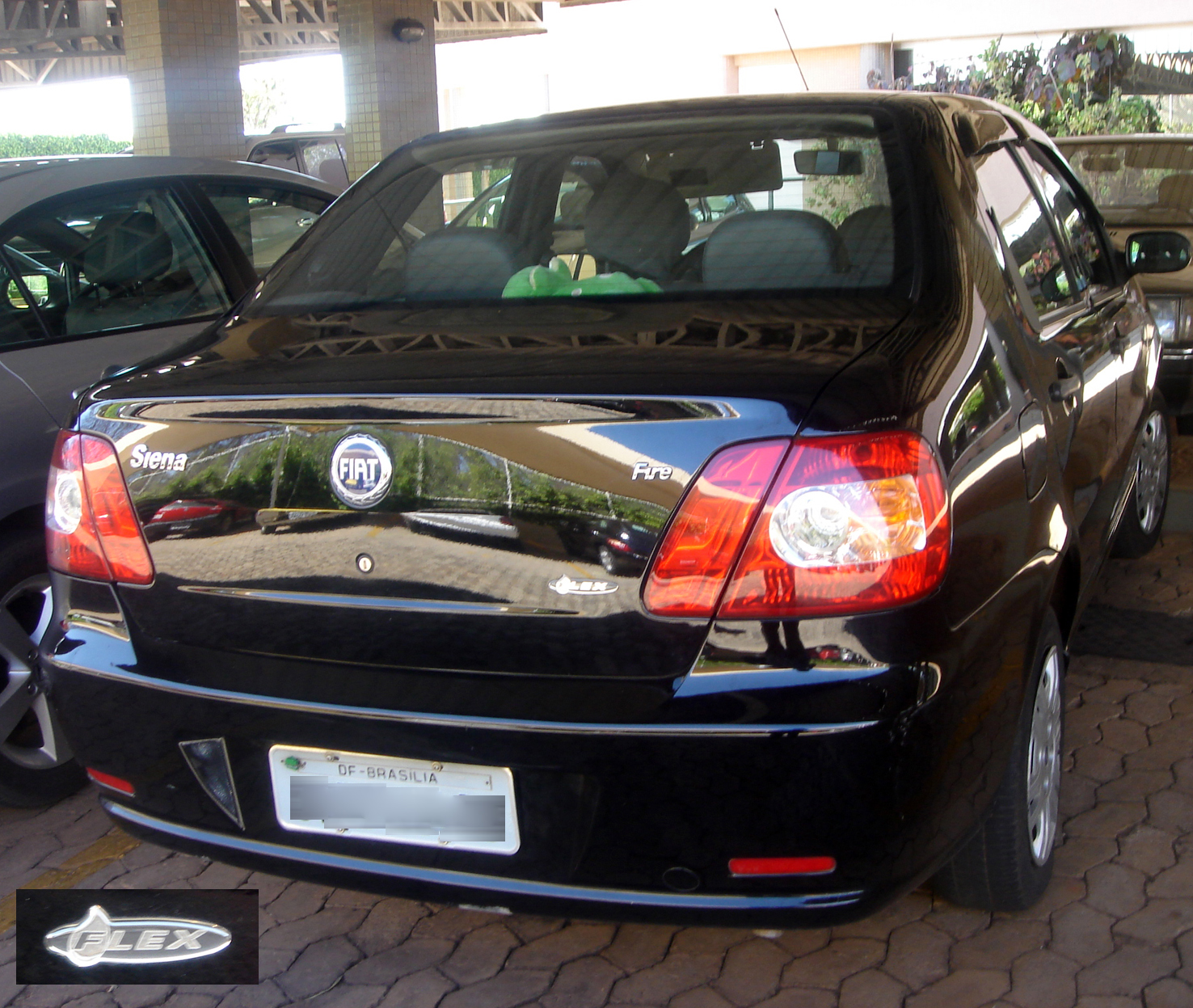
Fiat Siena Flex (Brazilian version).

Fiat offers the following vehicles in the Brazilian market under the label "Flex". These vehicles are capable of running on any blend from E20-E25 to E100

- 500
- Doblò
- Linea
- Idea
- Mille
- Palio, Palio Fire
- Palio Weekend
- Punto
- Siena
- Stilo
- Strada
- Uno

== Holden ==
2011 - 2013

- 3.0L V6 Commodore VE Series II
- 3.6L V6 Commodore VE Series II
- 6.0L V8 Commodore VE Series II

2013 - 2014

- 3.0L V6 Commodore VF Series I
- 3.6L V6 Commodore VF Series I
- 6.0L V8 Commodore VF Series I

== Honda ==
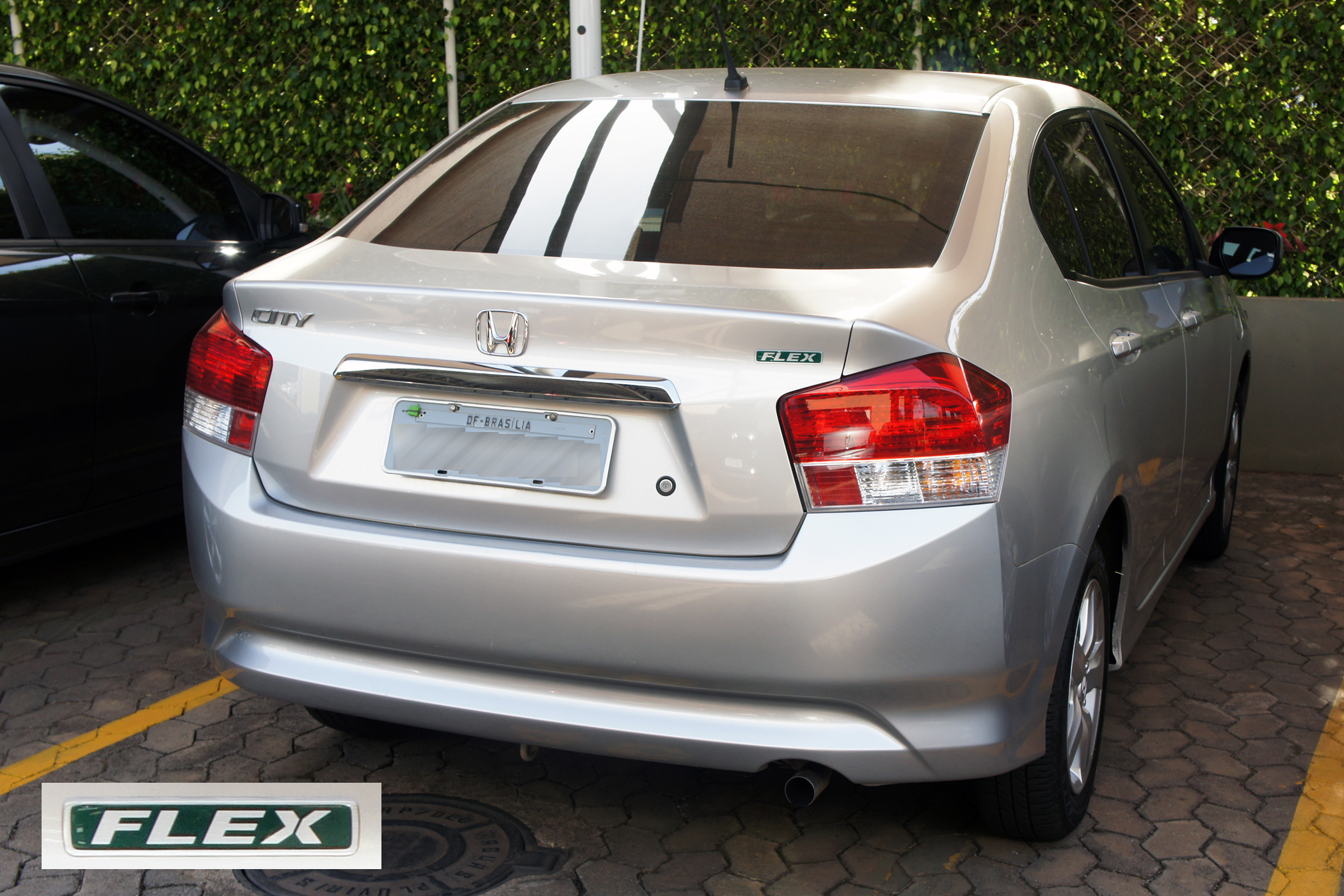
Honda City flex (Brazilian version).

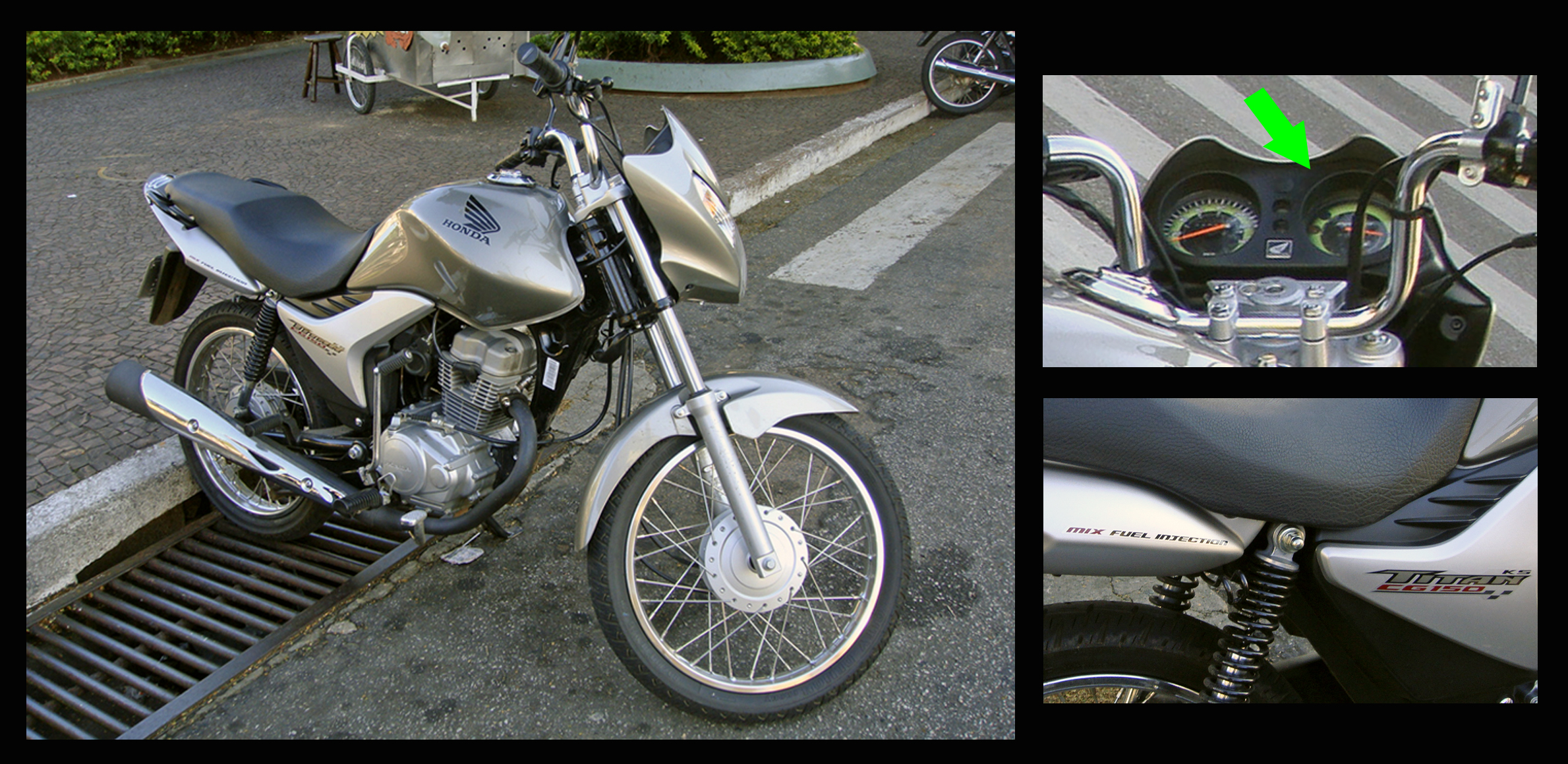
Honda CG 150 Titan Mix, the first flex-fuel motorcycle sold in the world.

Honda offers the following vehicles in the Brazilian market under the label "Flex". These vehicles, including the motorcycles, are capable of running on any blend from E20-E25 to E100.

Automobiles

- Honda City
- Honda Civic
- Honda Fit

Motorcycles

- Honda CG 150 Titan Mix
- Honda NXR 150 Bros Mix
- Honda GC 150 Fan Flex
- Honda BIZ 125 Flex

See also Honda's Brazilian flex-fuel vehicles.

== Hyundai ==
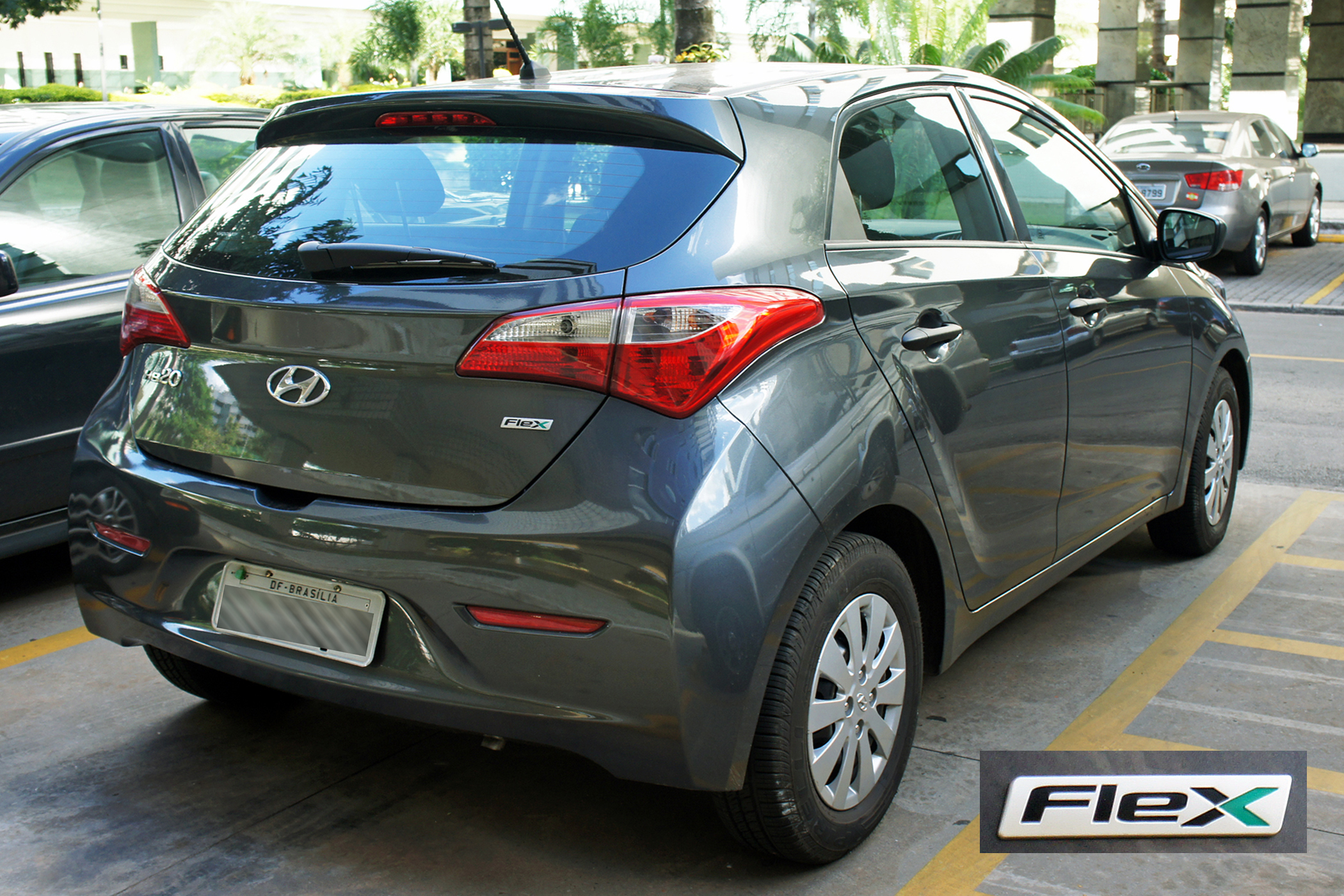
Hyundai HB20

Hyundai offers the following vehicles in the Brazilian market:

- Hyundai HB20

== Kia Motors ==
Kia Motors offers the following vehicle in the Brazilian market.

- Kia Soul
- Kia Sorento

== Mercedes-Benz ==
Mercedes-Benz offers the following vehicles in the North American market that use E85:

2019

- Mercedes-Benz CLA250 2.0L
- Mercedes-Benz GLA250 2.0L

2018

- Mercedes-Benz CLA250 2.0L
- Mercedes-Benz GLA250 2.0L
- Mercedes-Benz GLE350 3.5L

2008-

- Mercedes-Benz (W204 platform) C300 Luxury & Sport 3.0L

2007

- Mercedes-Benz (W203 platform) C230 Sedan 2.5L

2005

- Mercedes-Benz (W203 platform) C240 Luxury Sedan & Wagon 2.6L
- Mercedes-Benz (W203 platform) C320 Sedan, Sport Sedan & Wagon 3.2L (2003–2005)

In the Thai market are produced and sold the following models capable of running on any blend between E20 to E85:

2020-

- Mercedes-Benz (H247 platform) GLA200 Progressive & AMG Dynamic 1.3L

== Mitsubishi ==
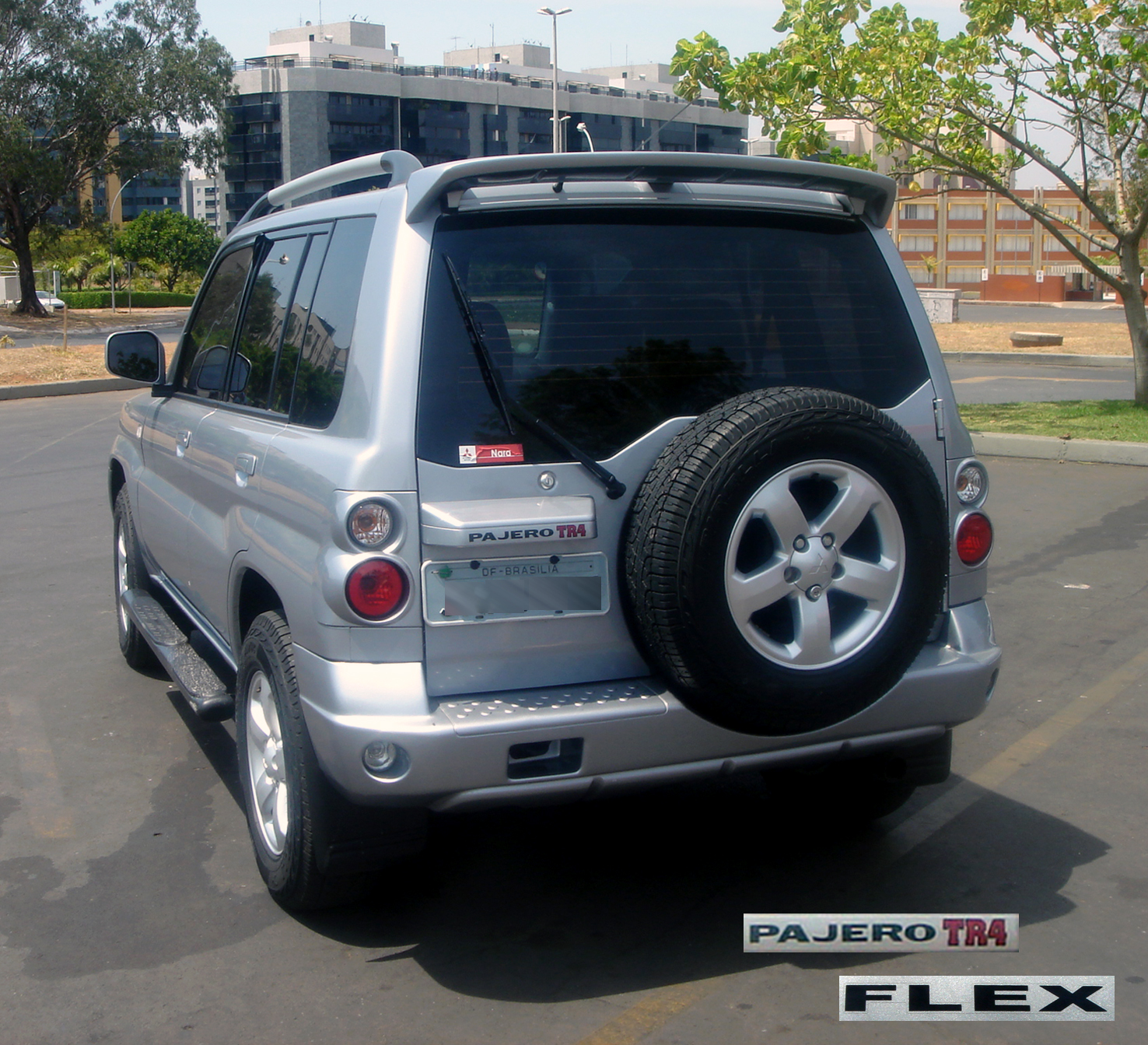
Mitsubishi Pajero TR4 Flex (Brazilian version).

Mitsubishi offers the following vehicles in the Brazilian market under the label "Flex" because they are capable of running on any blend from E20-E25 to E100

- Mitsubishi Pajero TR4
- Pajero Sport

In the Thai market are produced and sold the following models capable of running on any blend between E20 to E85:

- Lancer Ex

== Nissan ==
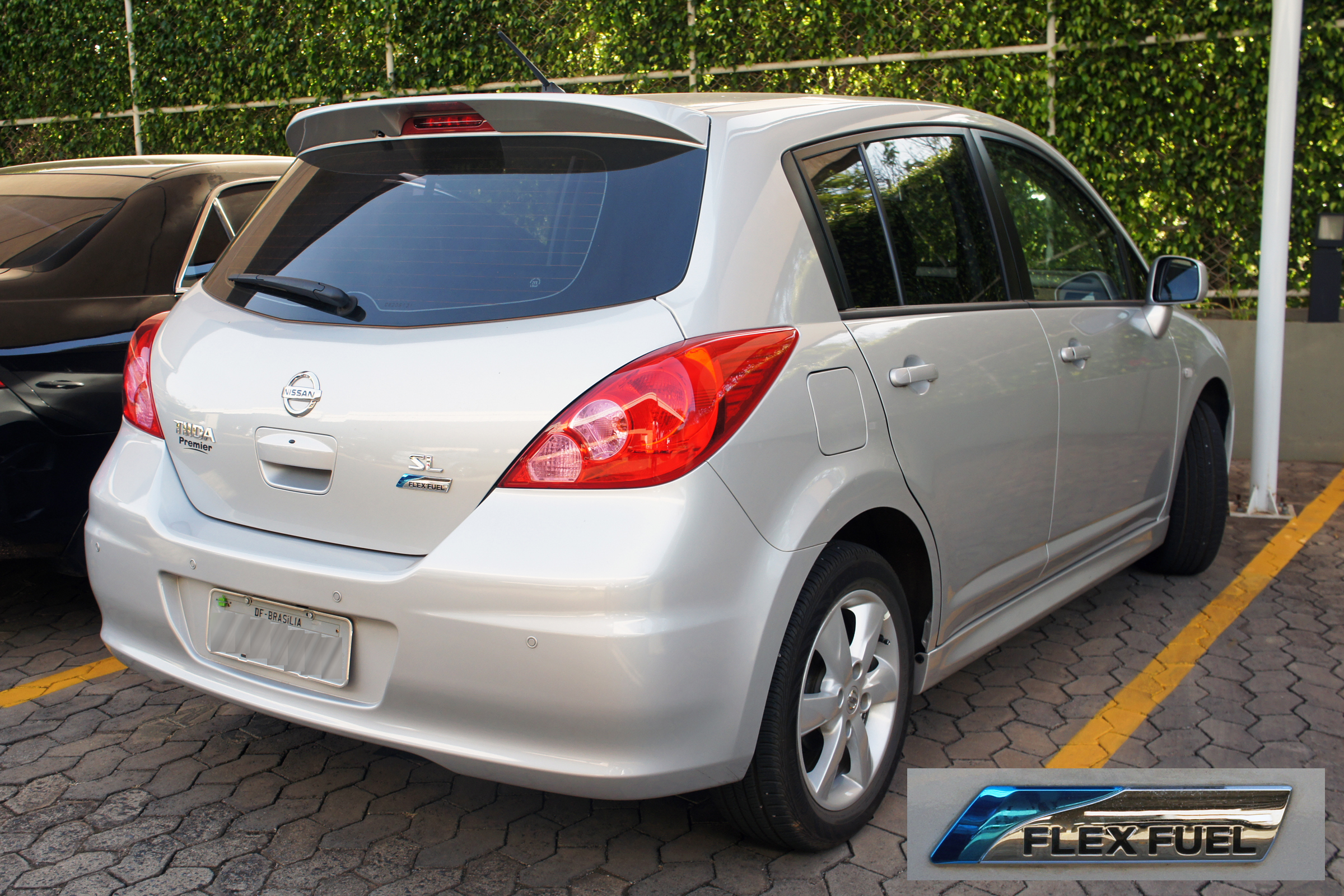
Nissan Tiida flex-fuel (Brazilian version).

Nissan offers the following vehicles in the Brazilian market under the label "Flex" because they are capable of running on any blend from E20-E25 to E100

- Livina
- March
- Sentra
- Tiida

== Peugeot ==
Peugeot offers the following FFV (E85) models (at least in Sweden, Benelux, France and Switzerland):

- Peugeot 307 1,6/2,0 BioFlex
- Peugeot 308 1,6/2,0 BioFlex
- Peugeot 407 2,0 BioFlex

== Renault ==
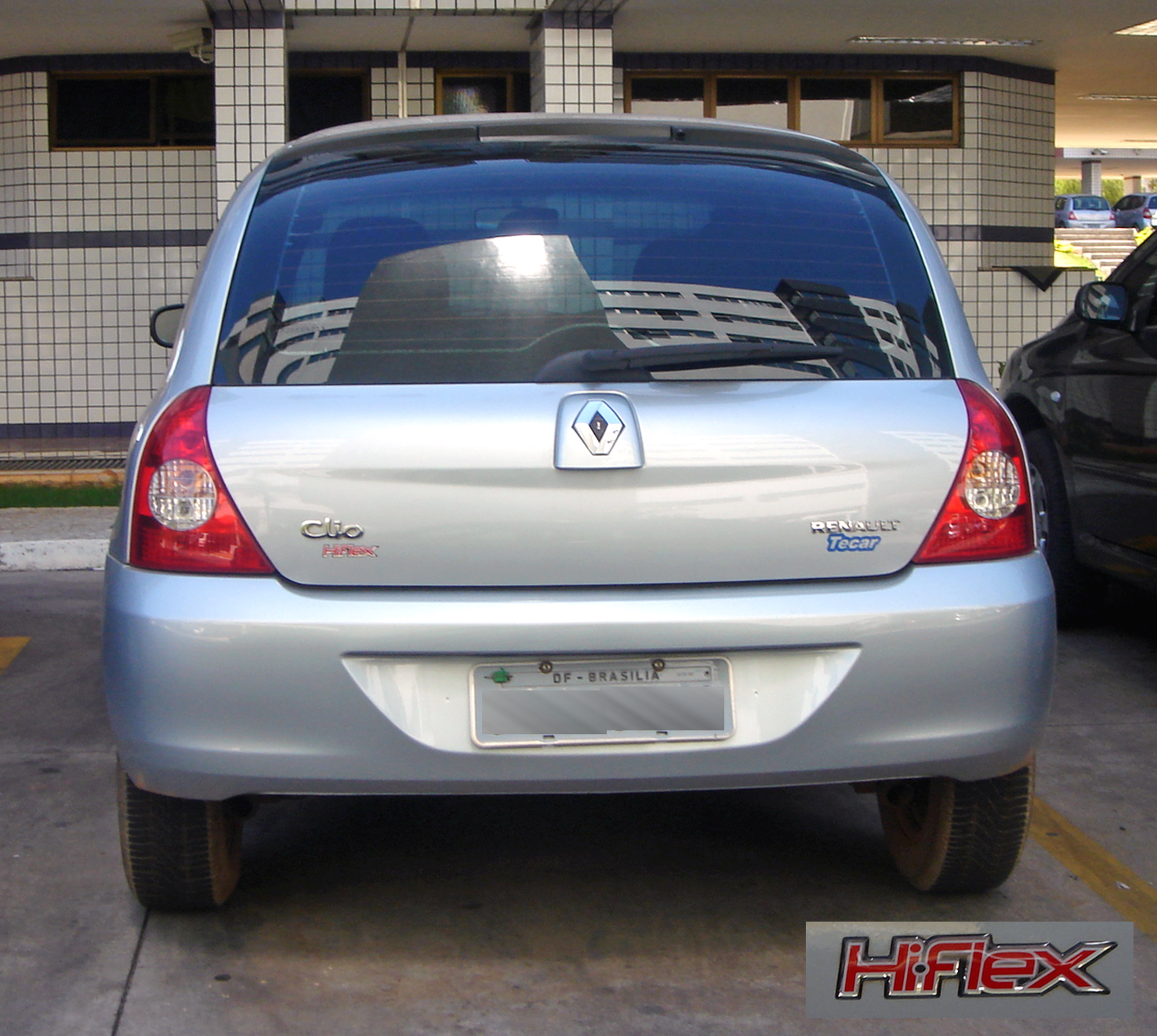
Renault Clio HiFlex (Brazil).

Renault offers the following FFV (E85) models (at least in Sweden, Benelux, France and Switzerland):

- Renault Clio III 1.2 16v Eco2
- Renault Mégane / Mégane Touring / Mégane Coupé 1.6 16v Eco2 Flex Fuel
- Renault Kangoo / Kangoo Express 1.6 16v 105 Flex Fuel

== Saab ==
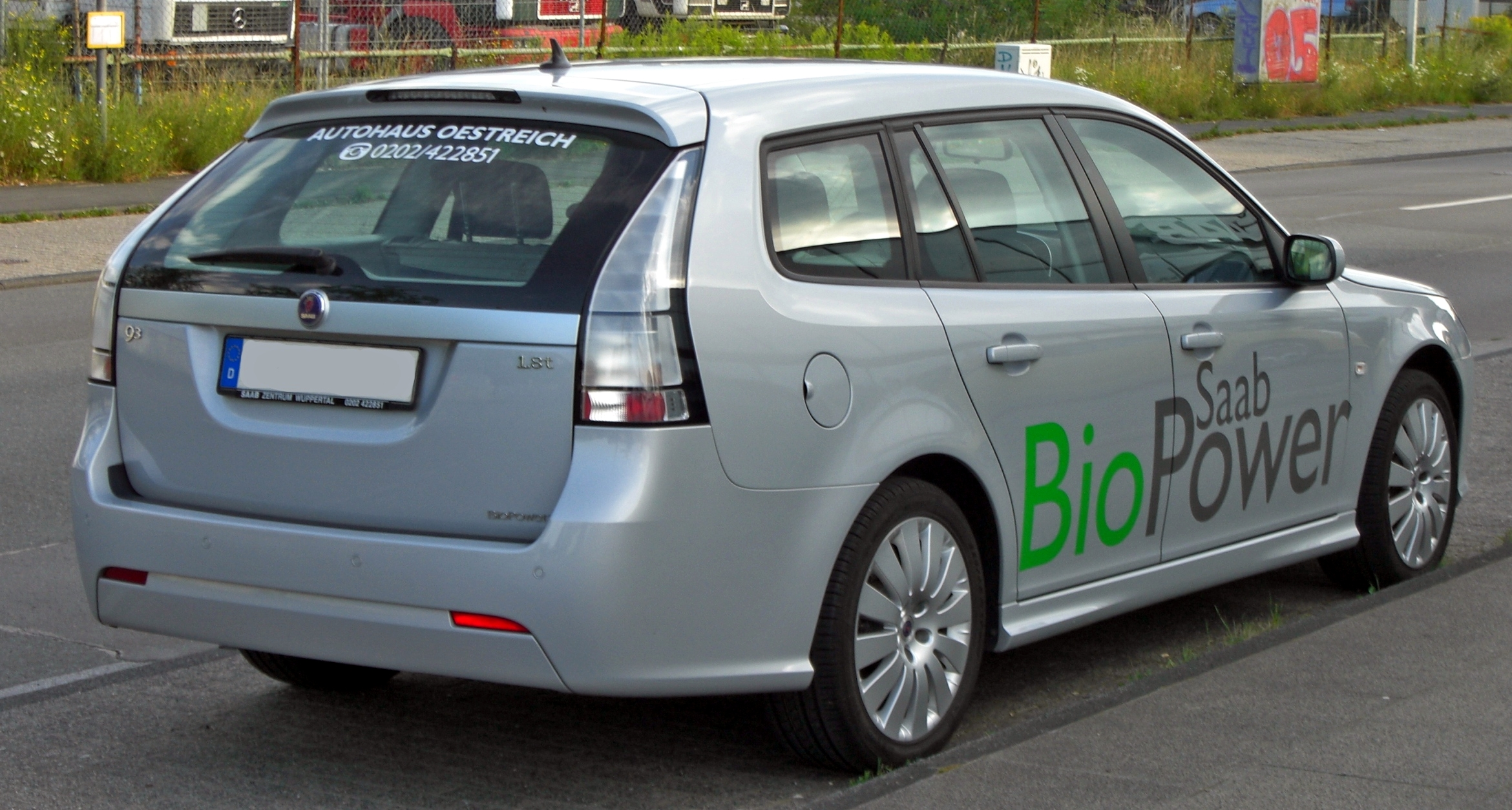
Saab 9-3 SportComi BioPower.

Saab offered the following vehicles in the European and Australian markets that use E85:.

- Saab 9-5 2.0t BioPower
- Saab 9-5 2.3t BioPower
- Saab 9-3 2.0t BioPower
- Saab 9-3 1.8t BioPower
- Saab Aero-X 2.7T (concept)
- Saab BioPower Hybrid 2.0T E100

== SEAT ==
SEAT offers the following FFV (E85) models under the label "MultiFuel":

- SEAT León MultiFuel 1.6 MPI E85 102 bhp
- SEAT Altea MultiFuel 1.6 MPI E85 102 bhp
- SEAT Altea XL MultiFuel 1.6 MPI E85 102 bhp

== Škoda Auto ==
Škoda offers the following FFV (E85) models (at least in Sweden, Benelux, France and Switzerland):

- Škoda Octavia MultiFuel 1.6 MPI E85 102 bhp

== Toyota ==
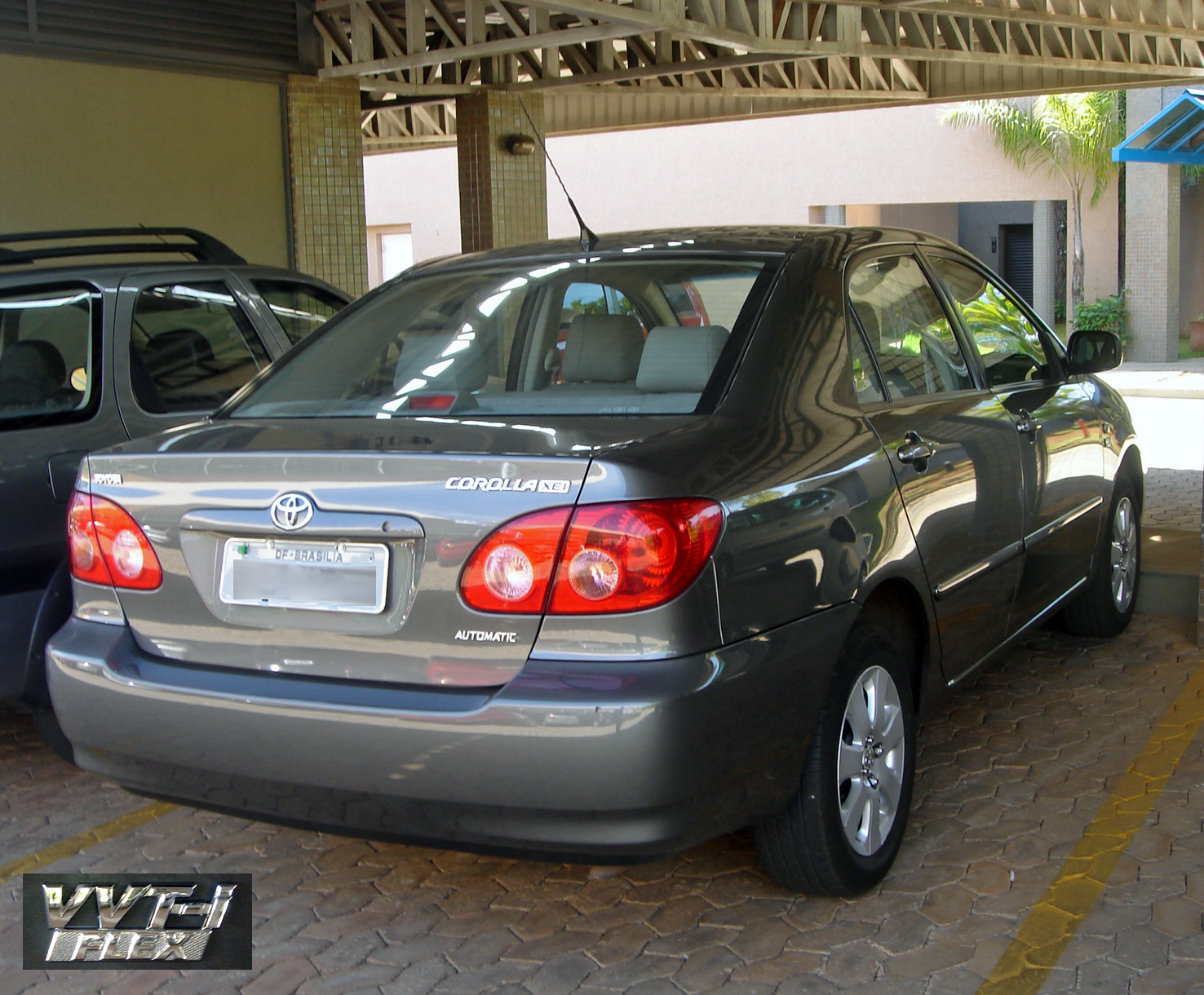
Toyota Corolla Flex (Brazilian version).

Toyota offers the following vehicles in the Brazilian market under the label "Flex". These vehicles are capable of running on any blend from E20-E25 to E100

- Toyota Corolla VVT-i Flex
- Toyota Fielder Flex
- Toyota Etios Flex 1.3L and 1.5L

In the Thai market are produced and sold the following models capable of running on any blend between E20 to E85:

- Corolla Altis Flex 1.6L and 1.8L
- Toyota Corolla Cross 1.8 Sport
- Toyota Camry (2.0L; Discontinued) and 2.5L

== Volvo ==
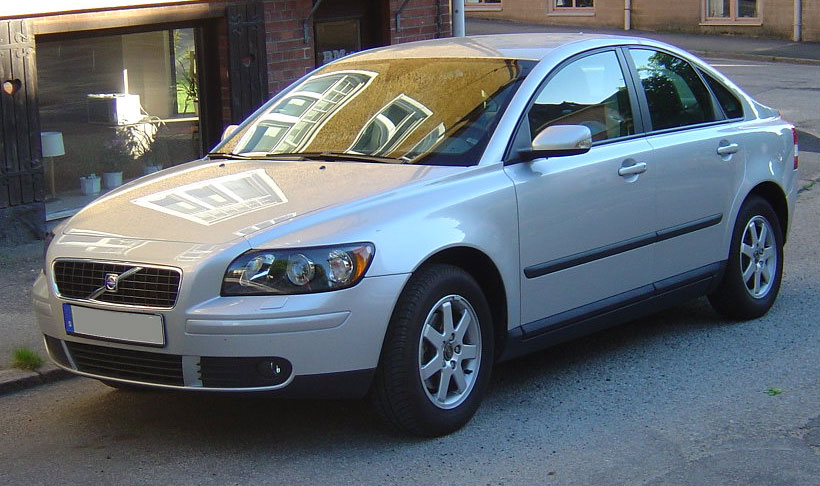
The 2005 Volvo FlexiFuel S40 was one of the first E85 flex-fuel cars by a Swedish automaker.

Volvo offered the following vehicles in the European market that use E85: With the exception of the 2.5FT engine, all engines were derived from Ford and were similar to those used in the Ford Focus and Ford Mondeo.

- Volvo C30 1.8F FlexiFuel
- Volvo S40 1.8F FlexiFuel
- Volvo V50 1.8F FlexiFuel
- Volvo XC60 (concept) 2.5FT FlexiFuel
- Volvo V70 2.0F FlexiFuel
- Volvo V70 2.5FT FlexiFuel
- Volvo V70 T4F FlexiFuel
- Volvo S80 2.0F FlexiFuel
- Volvo S80 2.5FT FlexiFuel
- Volvo S80 T4F FlexiFuel

== Volkswagen ==
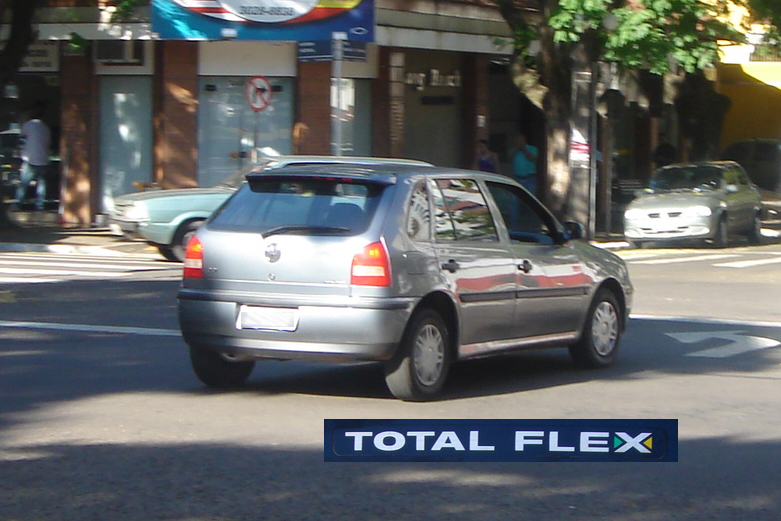
The 2003 VW Gol 1.6 Total Flex was the first flexible-fuel vehicle produced in Brazil, runs on any blend of gasoline and ethanol E100.

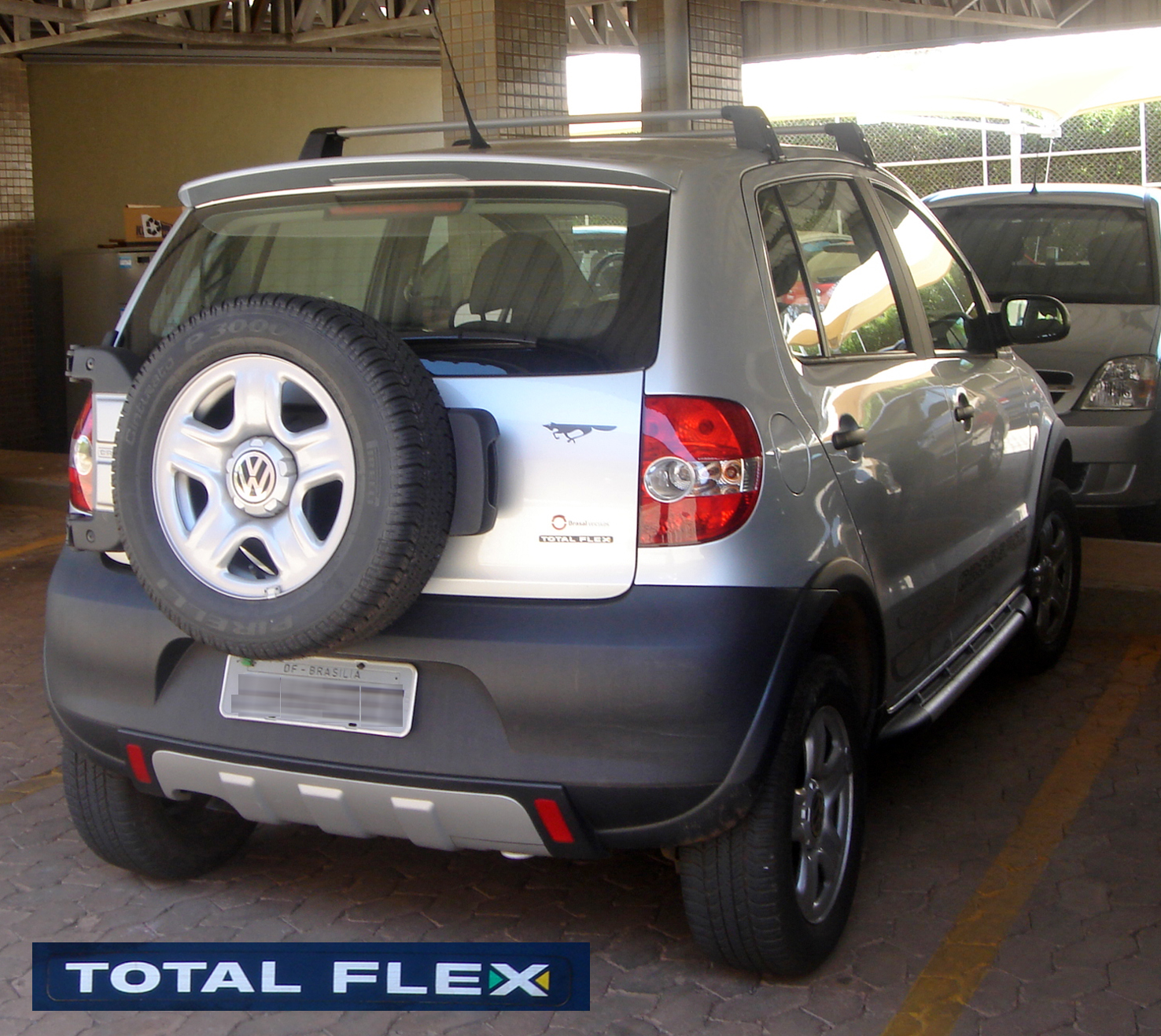
VW CrossFox TotalFlex (Brazilian version).

Volkswagen offers the following vehicles in the Brazilian market under the label "Total Flex" because they are capable of running on any blend from E20-E25 to E100

- Bora
- CrossFox
- Fox
- Gol
- Golf
- Kombi
- Parati
- Polo
- Routan
- Saveiro
- SpaceFox
- Voyage

The following E85 "Multifuel" models are offered in Sweden, Benelux and Switzerland

- Golf and Golf Plus
- Volkswagen Jetta

There's currently no E85 models offered in Germany. The offered "BiFuel" cars

- Golf and Golf Plus
- Volkswagen Jetta

do only combine Gasoline (E10) with a separate Cargas Tank.

== Yamaha ==
Yamaha offers the following vehicles in the Brazilian market under the label "Blueflex":

Motorcycles

- Fazer 250 Blueflex
- Ténéré 250 Blueflex

== See also ==
- List of hybrid vehicles
