= Hyundai Motor Brasil =

Car manufacturing plant by Hyundai Motor Company

- Company type: Subsidiary
- Industry: Automotive
- Founded: 2012
- Headquarters: Piracicaba, São Paulo
- Parent: Hyundai Motor Company
- Website: www.hyundai.com.br

Hyundai Motor Brasil is the Brazilian subsidiary of the Hyundai Motor Company. Located in Piracicaba, São Paulo, HMB is the first Hyundai Motor plant in Latin America. With an investment of around R$1.2 billion, the plant has the capacity to produce 180,000 cars per year under three shifts. Hyundai Motor Brasil was complete in November 2012 with an investment of 7 million dollars. Over a total area of 1,390,000 m^{2}, complete vehicle production facilities for press, car body, outfitting, painting, parts/logistics warehouses, vehicle shipping areas, and other ancillary facilities were built with a total floor space of about 69,000m².

Hyundai Brasil launched the Hyundai HB20, which started the new line of automobiles called HB, which means "Hyundai Brasil". On September 25, 2022, the cumulative sales volume of Hyundai Motor plant reached 1,758,810 units. Sales in Brazil are 1,719,868 units, with exports of 38,942 units.

== Current models ==
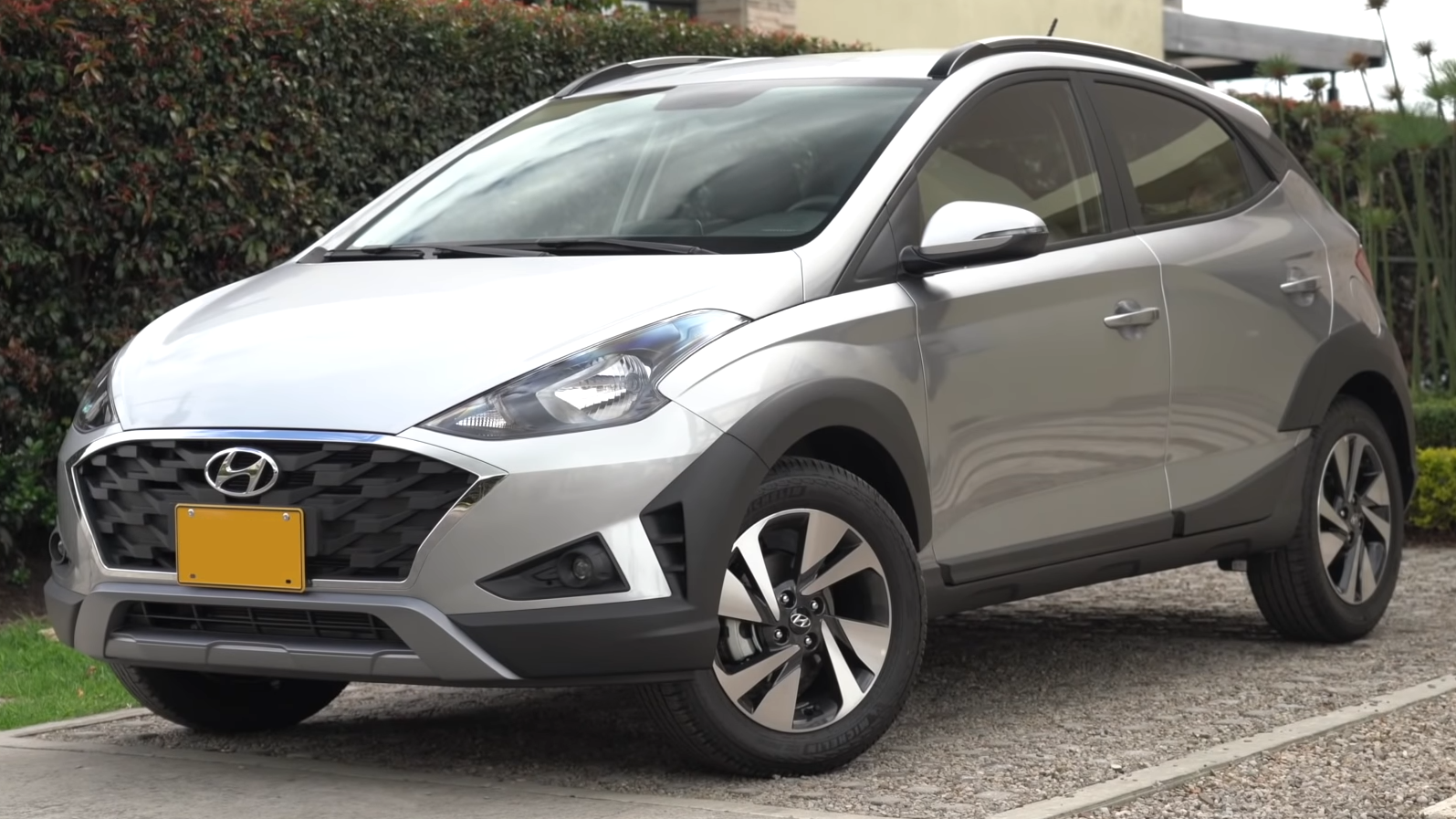
Hyundai HB20, exclusively manufactured by HMB.

=== Manufactured locally ===
- Hyundai HB20 (2012–present)
- Hyundai Creta (2017–present)
- Hyundai i20 (2026–present)

=== Imported ===
- Hyundai Kona Hybrid
- Hyundai Palisade
- Hyundai Ioniq 5

== See also ==
- List of Hyundai Motor Company manufacturing facilities
