= Hyundai HB20 =

Subcompact car produced by Hyundai marketed only for Latin American markets

- Second generation HB20

Overview
- Manufacturer: Hyundai
- Production: 2012–present
- Assembly: Brazil: Piracicaba, São Paulo (Hyundai Motor Brasil)

Body and chassis
- Class: Subcompact car (B)
- Body style: 5-door hatchback 4-door sedan
- Layout: Front-engine, front-wheel-drive
- Platform: Hyundai-Kia PB
- Related: Hyundai Accent; Hyundai i20 Kia Rio

The Hyundai HB20 is a subcompact car produced by South Korean manufacturer Hyundai Motor Company since 2012 in Brazil. It is the first and only Hyundai model strategically developed and produced exclusively for the Brazilian market. Offered with a range of flex-fuel engines, it was not exported to other Latin American countries until 2016, when it began to be sold in Paraguay and Uruguay, eventually in Mexico and Colombia in 2022, and Argentina in 2024.

"HB" stands for "Hyundai Brasil", while the number "20" is the company's characterization for vehicles in this segment in line with the similarly sized Hyundai i20.

== First generation (HB; 2012) ==
First generation
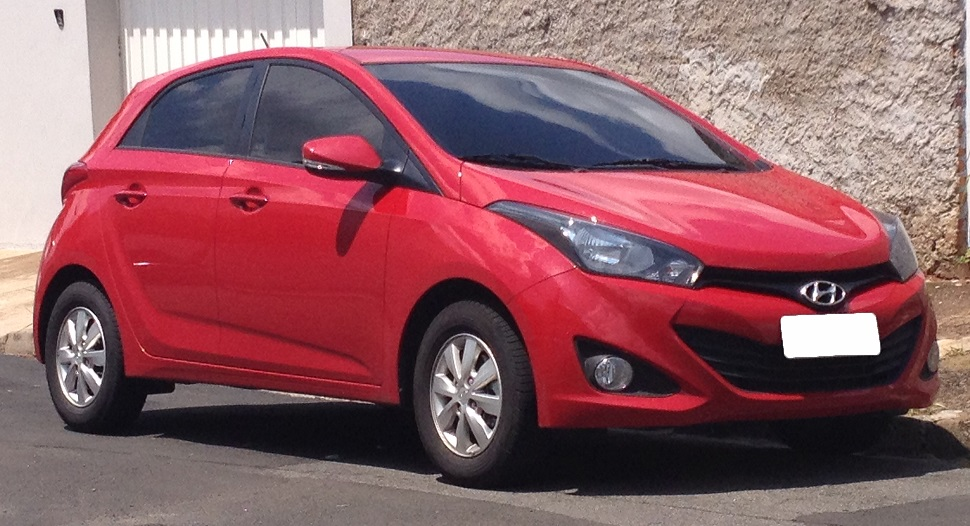

Overview
- Model code: HB
- Production: 2012–2019
- Designer: Casey Hyun

Powertrain
- Engine: Petrol: 1.0 L Kappa MPi FLEX I3; 1.6 L Gamma MPi FLEX I4
- Transmission: 5-speed manual 4-speed automatic

Dimensions
- Wheelbase: 2,500 mm (98.4 in)
- Length: 3,920 mm (154.3 in) (hatchback); 4,230 mm (166.5 in) (sedan); 3,995 mm (157.3 in) (HB20X)
- Width: 1,680–1,710 mm (66.1–67.3 in)
- Height: 1,470–1,550 mm (57.9–61.0 in)

It has two engine options, which are 1.0-litre and 1.6-litre. The higher versions do feature a 1.6-litre Gamma engine with 128 hp. The HB20 is available with both automatic and manual transmission for 1.6-litre and only manual transmission for 1.0-litre in this generation.

In 2013, over 75% of the HB20 parts are made in Brazil.

=== HB20S ===
The Hyundai HB20S is the sedan version of the HB20 hatchback. It has the same engine and transmission choices from the regular HB20. It has the same wheelbase as the hatchback but is longer with 4.23 m (166.5 in) and has a larger trunk at 450 L (16 cu ft) compared to the 300 L (11 cu ft) in the regular HB20.

=== HB20X ===
The Hyundai HB20X is an adventure version which sets it apart from the standard HB20. As is the case for other similar models, it is available only with front-wheel drive. It is produced and sold only in Brazil to compete in the expanding mini SUV market.

This version contains mixed use tires, a suspension raised slightly and a few visual upgrades. It is available only with the 1.6-litre Gamma engine.

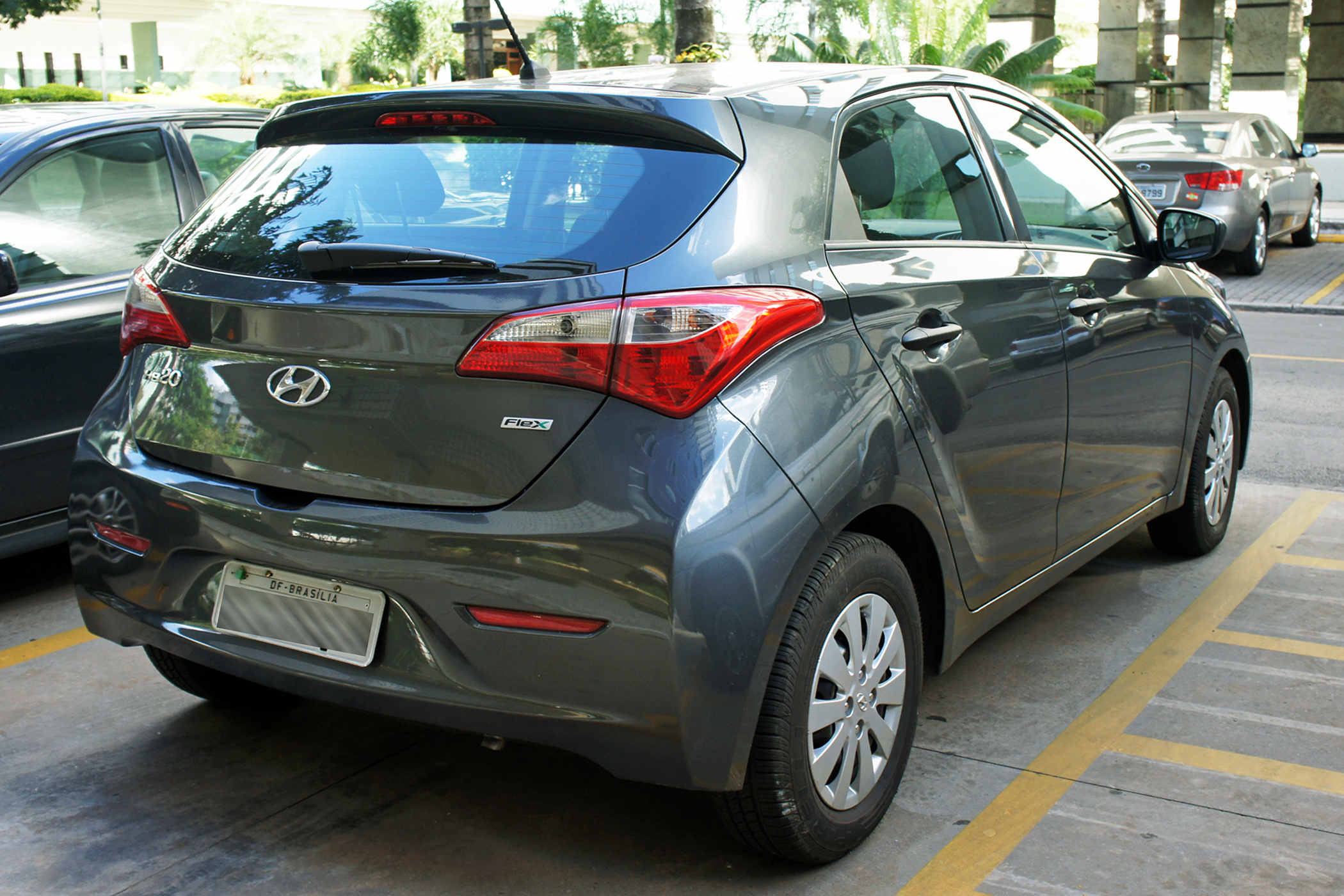
Rear view (pre-facelift)

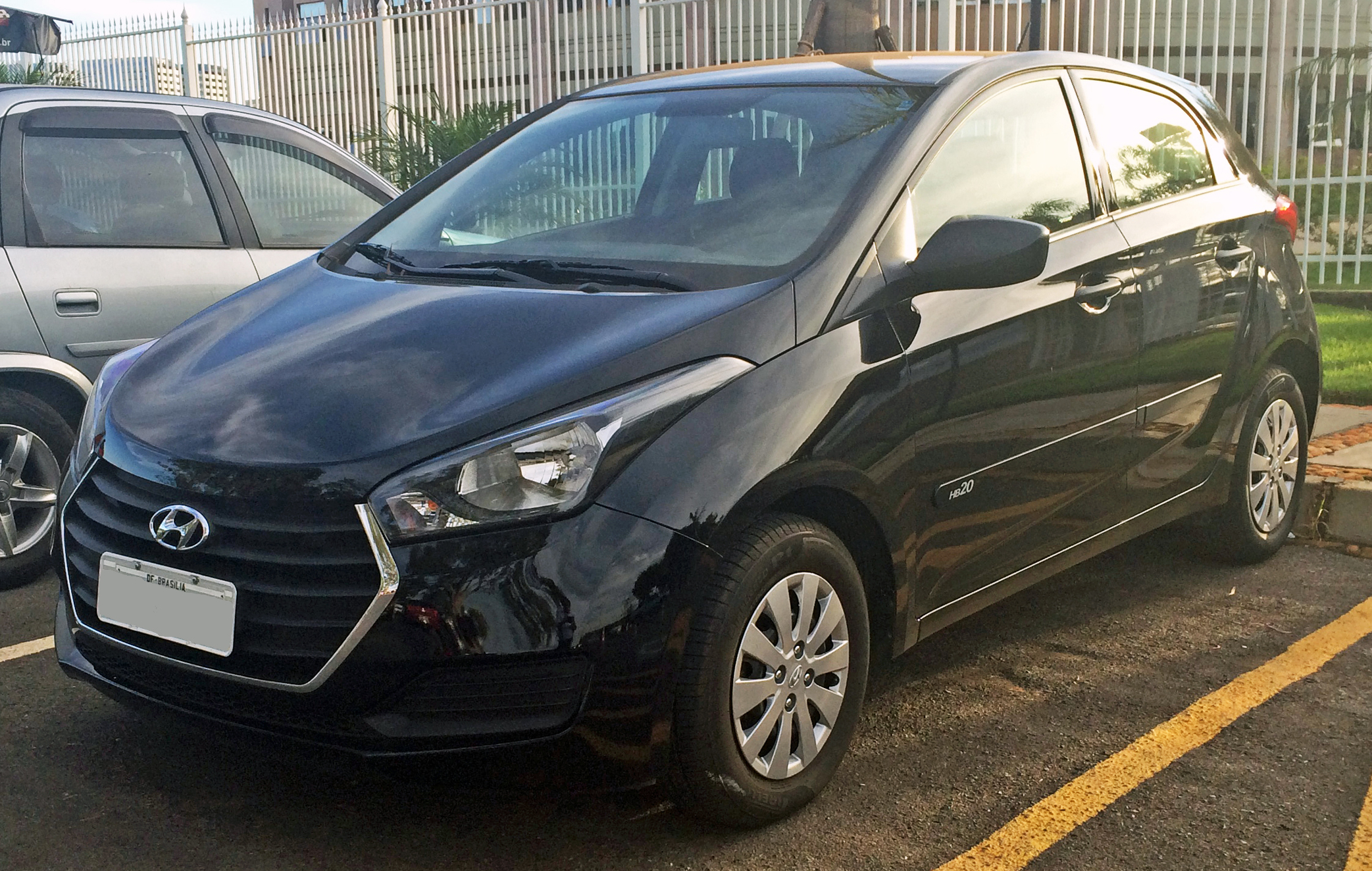
2016 Hyundai HB20 (facelift)

=== Concept car ===
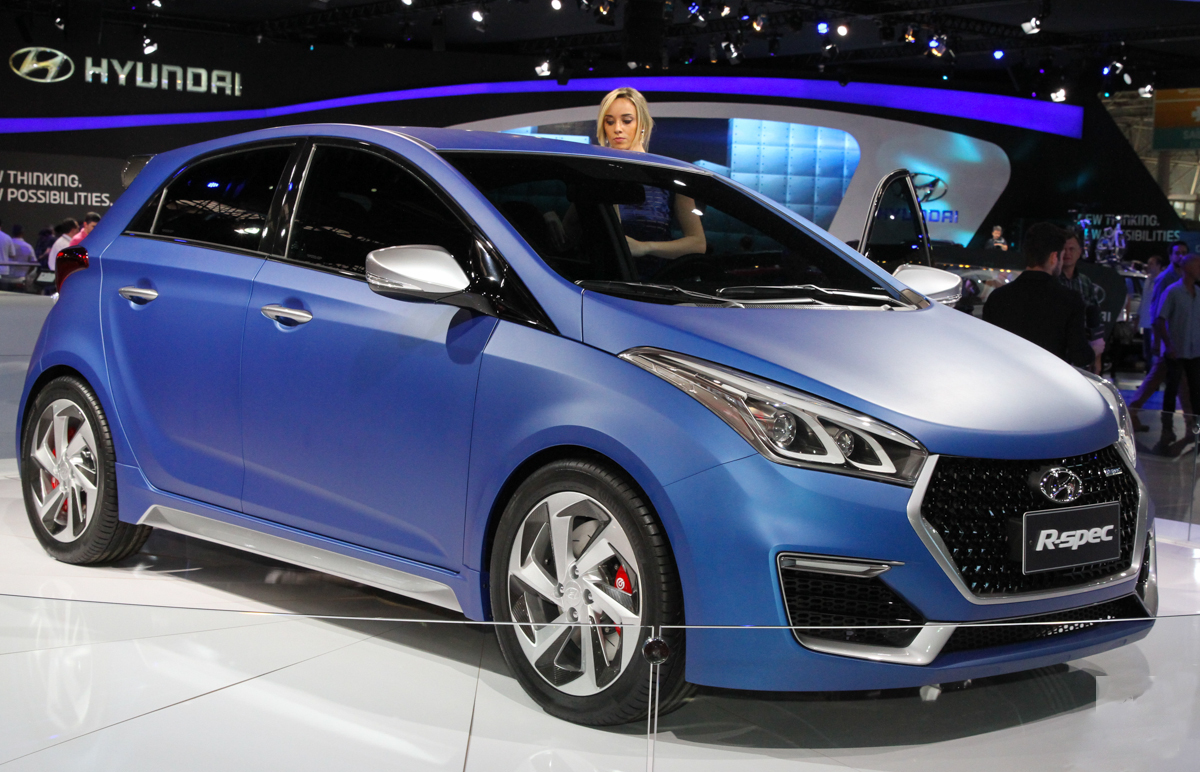
Hyundai HB20 R-Spec Concept

The Hyundai HB20 R-Spec Concept was presented at the 2014 São Paulo Motor Show.

=== Safety ===
The HB20 in its most basic version for Latin America received 3 stars for adult occupants and 1 star for toddlers from Latin NCAP 1.0 in March 2013.

Latin NCAP 1.5 test results Hyundai HB20 + 2 Airbags (2013, similar to Euro NCAP 2002)
Test	Points	Stars
Adult occupant:	10.23/17.0	3 /5 stars
Child occupant:	4.77/49.00	1 /5 stars

The updated HB20 in its most basic version for Latin America received 4 stars for adult occupants and 3 stars for toddlers from Latin NCAP 1.0 in November 2013.

Latin NCAP 1.5 test results Hyundai HB20 + 2 Airbags (from august 2013) (2013, similar to Euro NCAP 2002)
Test	Points	Stars
Adult occupant:	13.80/17.0	4 /5 stars
Child occupant:	34.52/49.00	3 /5 stars

== Second generation (BR2; 2019) ==
Second generation
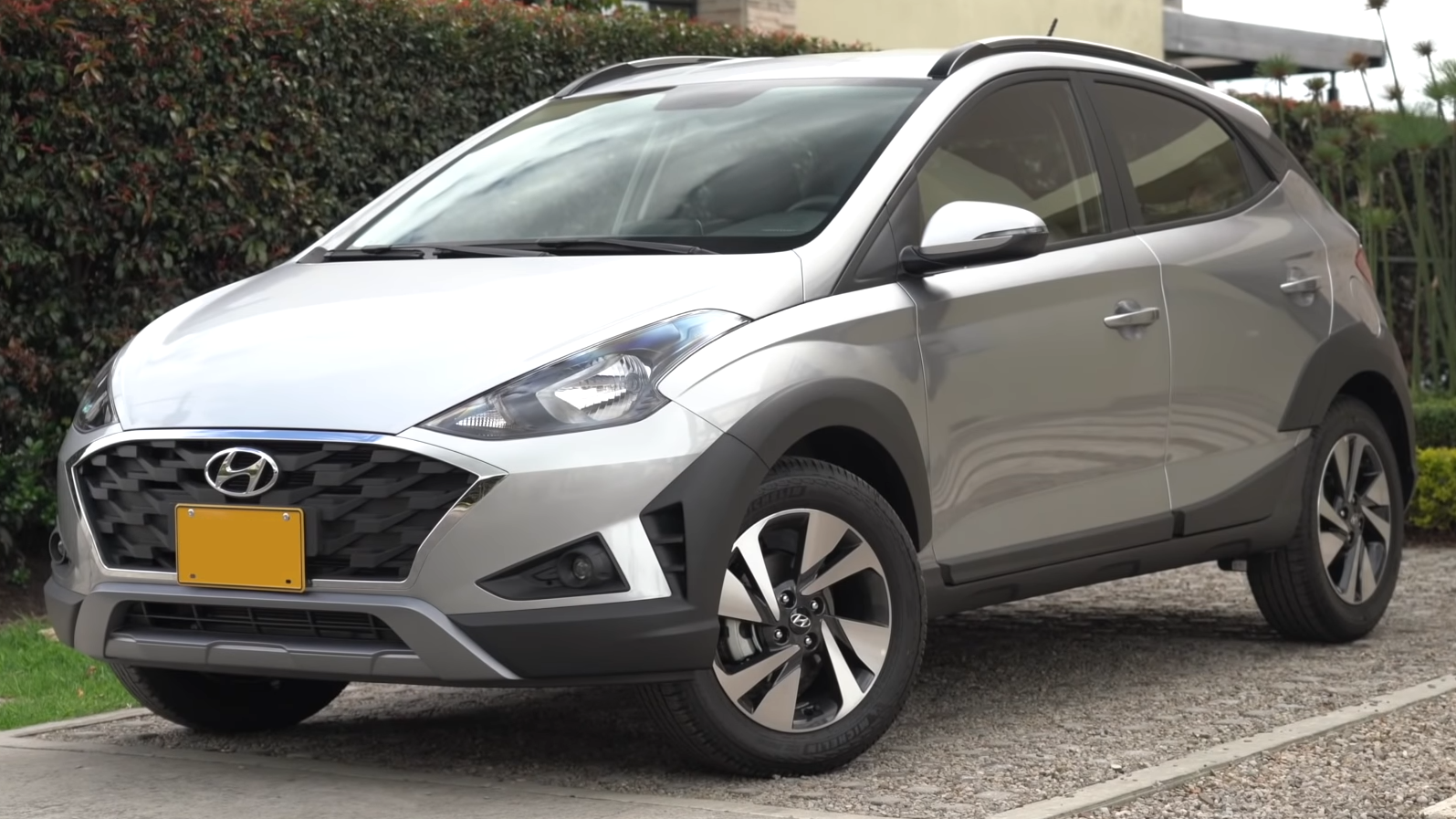
- Hyundai Graviti HB20X (Colombia)

Overview
- Model code: BR2
- Also called: Hyundai Getz HB20; Hyundai Accent HB20S; Hyundai Graviti HB20X
- Production: 2019–present

Powertrain
- Engine: Petrol: 1.0 L Kappa MPi FLEX I3; 1.0 L Kappa T-GDi FLEX I3; 1.6 L Gamma MPi FLEX I4
- Transmission: 5-speed manual 4-speed automatic 6-speed automatic

Dimensions
- Wheelbase: 2,530 mm (99.6 in)
- Length: 3,940 mm (155.1 in) (hatchback); 4,260 mm (167.7 in) (sedan); 3,995 mm (157.3 in) (HB20X)
- Width: 1,700 mm (66.9 in)
- Height: 1,470–1,550 mm (57.9–61.0 in)

Chronology
- Predecessor: Hyundai Accent (Mexico)

The second generation HB20 was launched on 17 September 2019. It is also available in a crossover-look variant named HB20X.

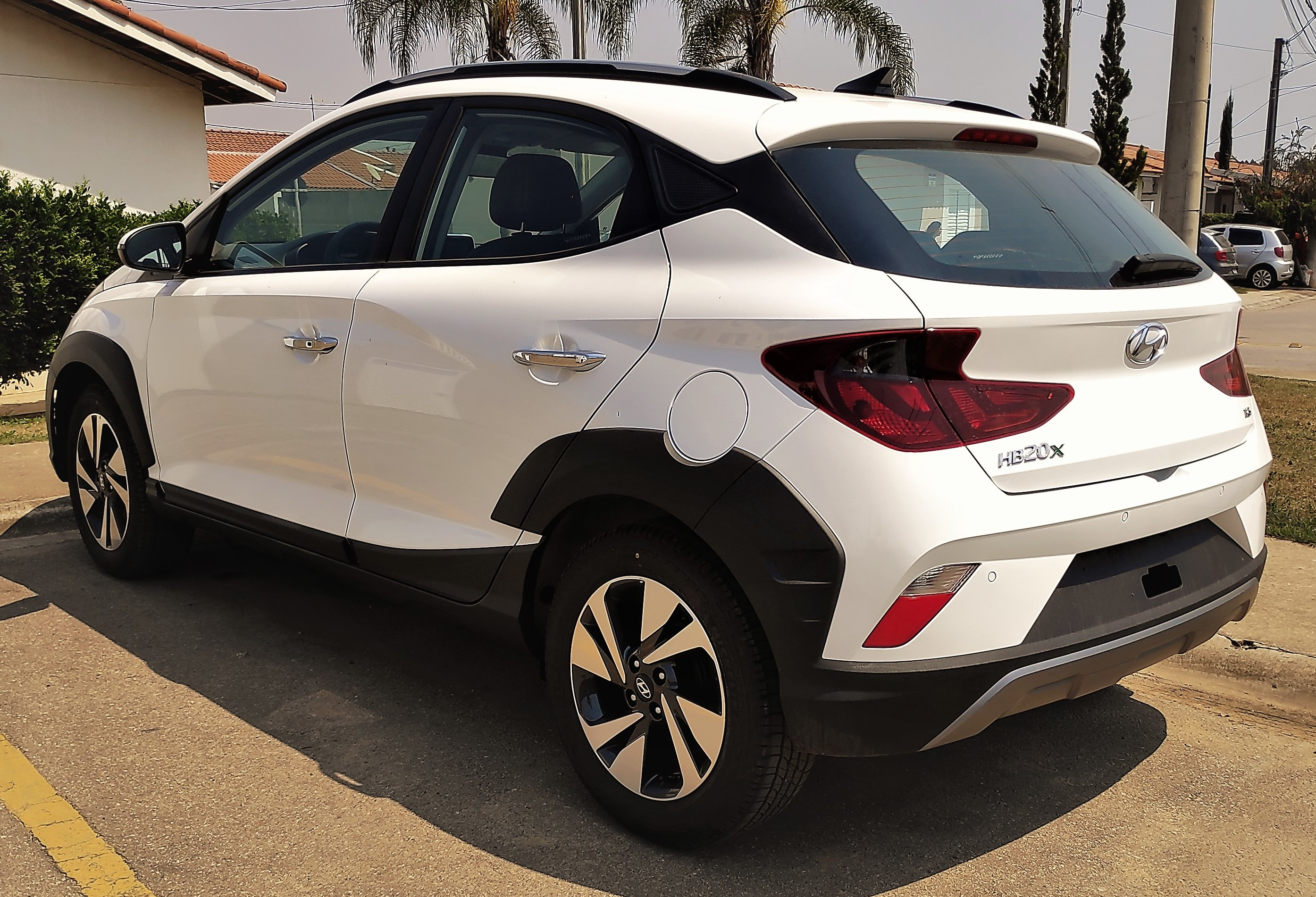
Hyundai HB20X (Brazil) rear view

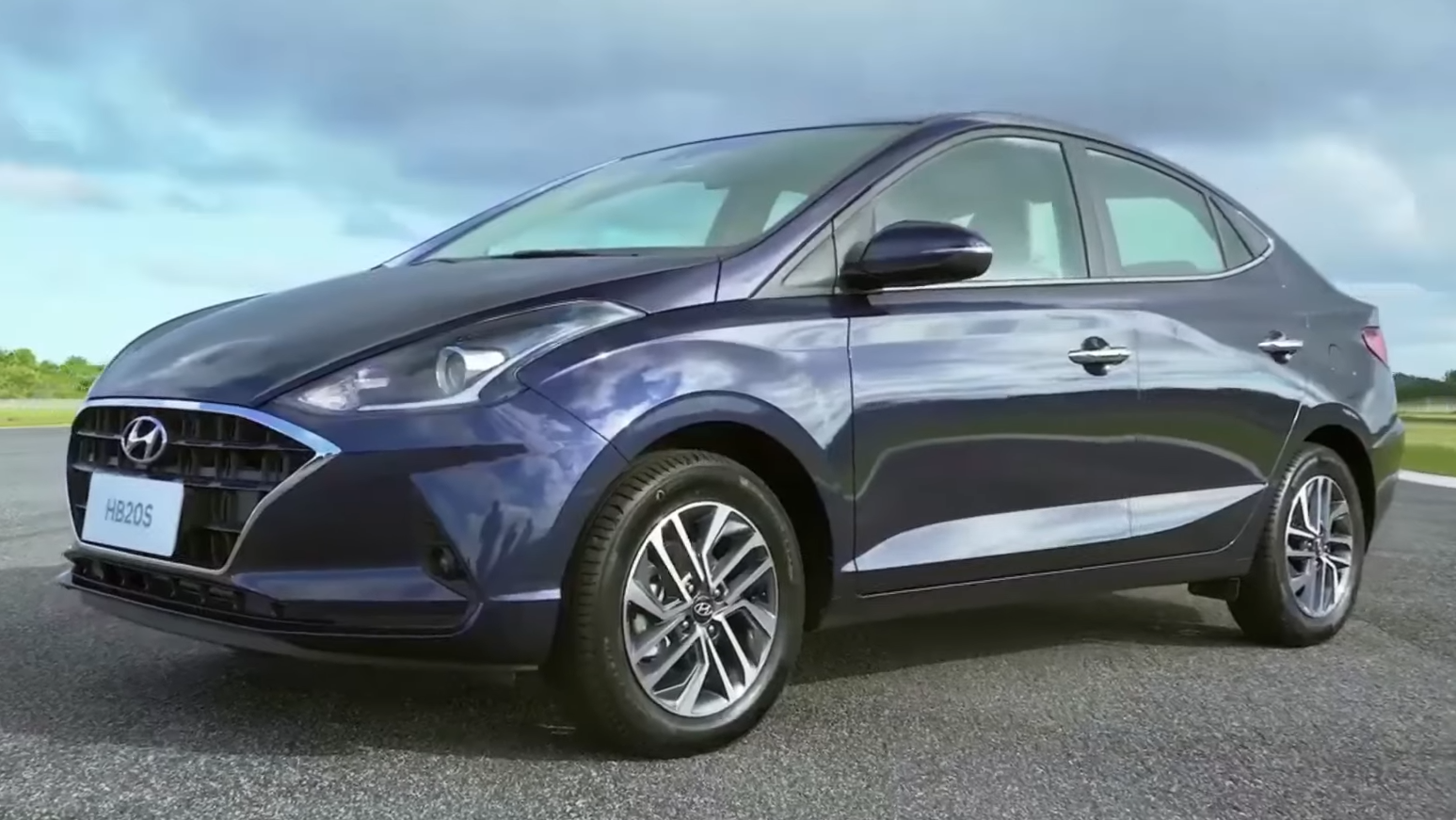
Hyundai HB20S (Brazil) front view

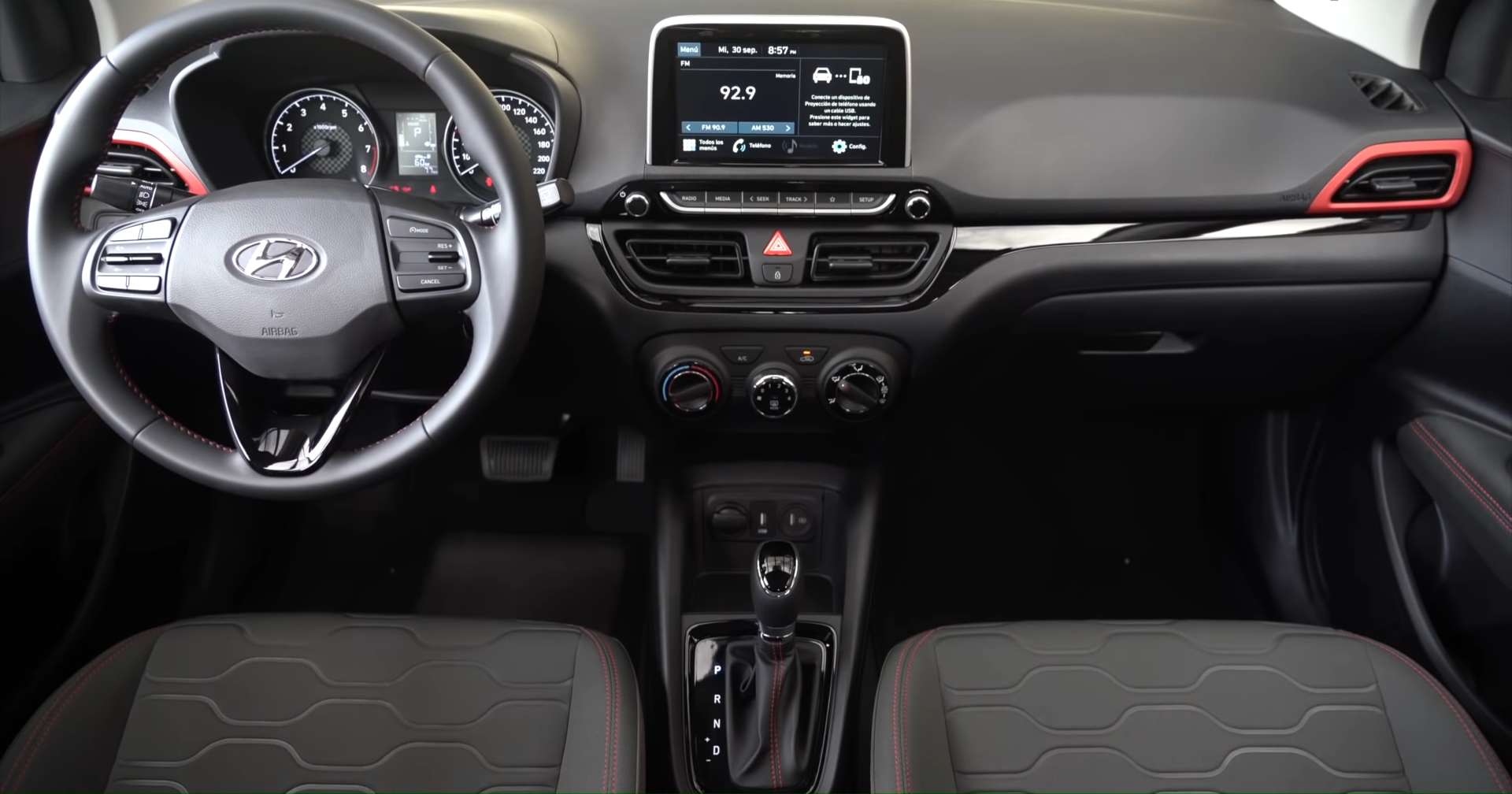
Hyundai Graviti HB20X (Colombia) interior

=== Facelift ===
The facelifted HB20 was released in July 2022 for the 2023 model year.

On 27 September 2022, the HB20 arrived to the Mexican market, replacing the locally-built Accent. Available in both sedan and hatchback body styles, the HB20 is available in three trim levels; GL (sedan only), GL Mid, and GLS. It is also available with an automatic or manual transmission.

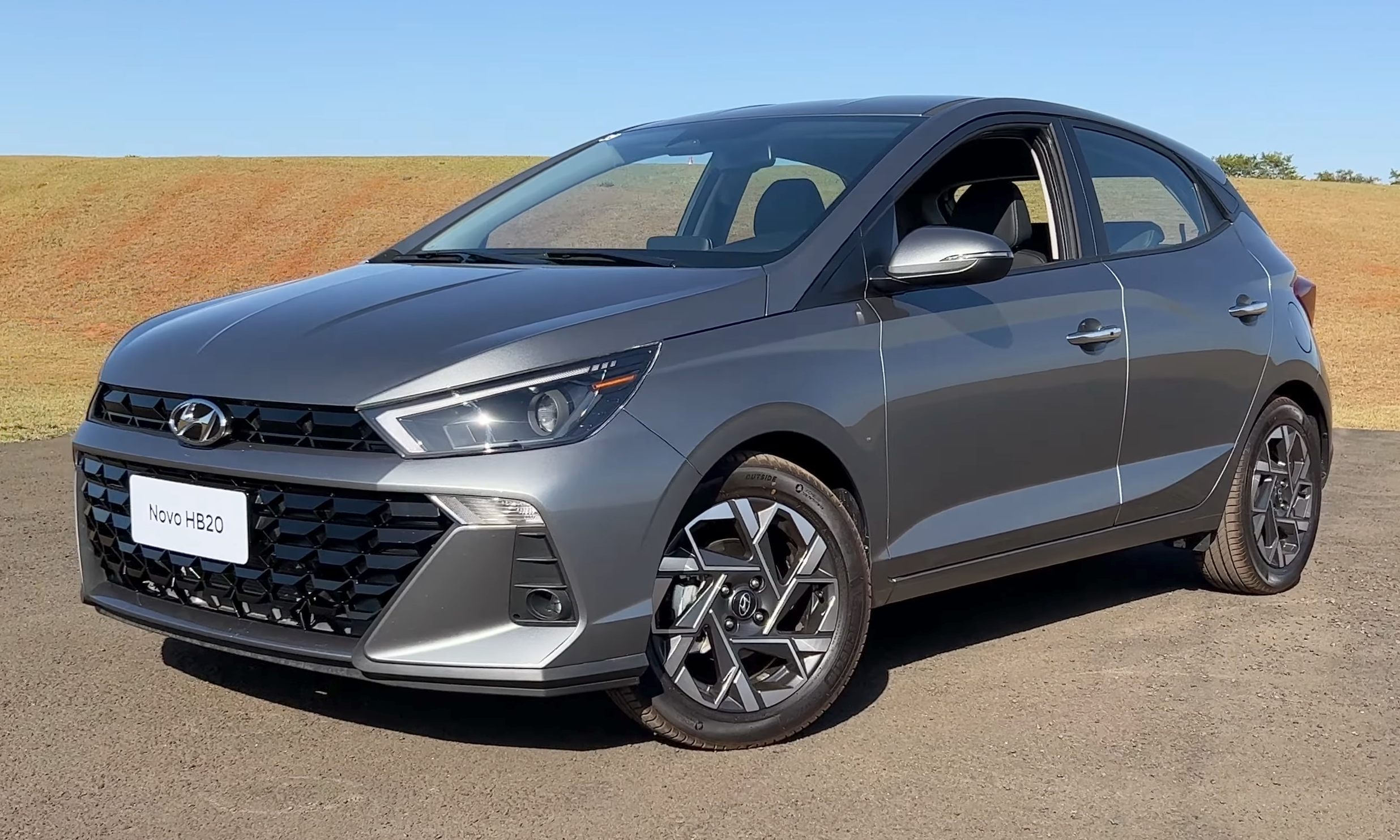
Hyundai HB20 (Colombia, facelift)

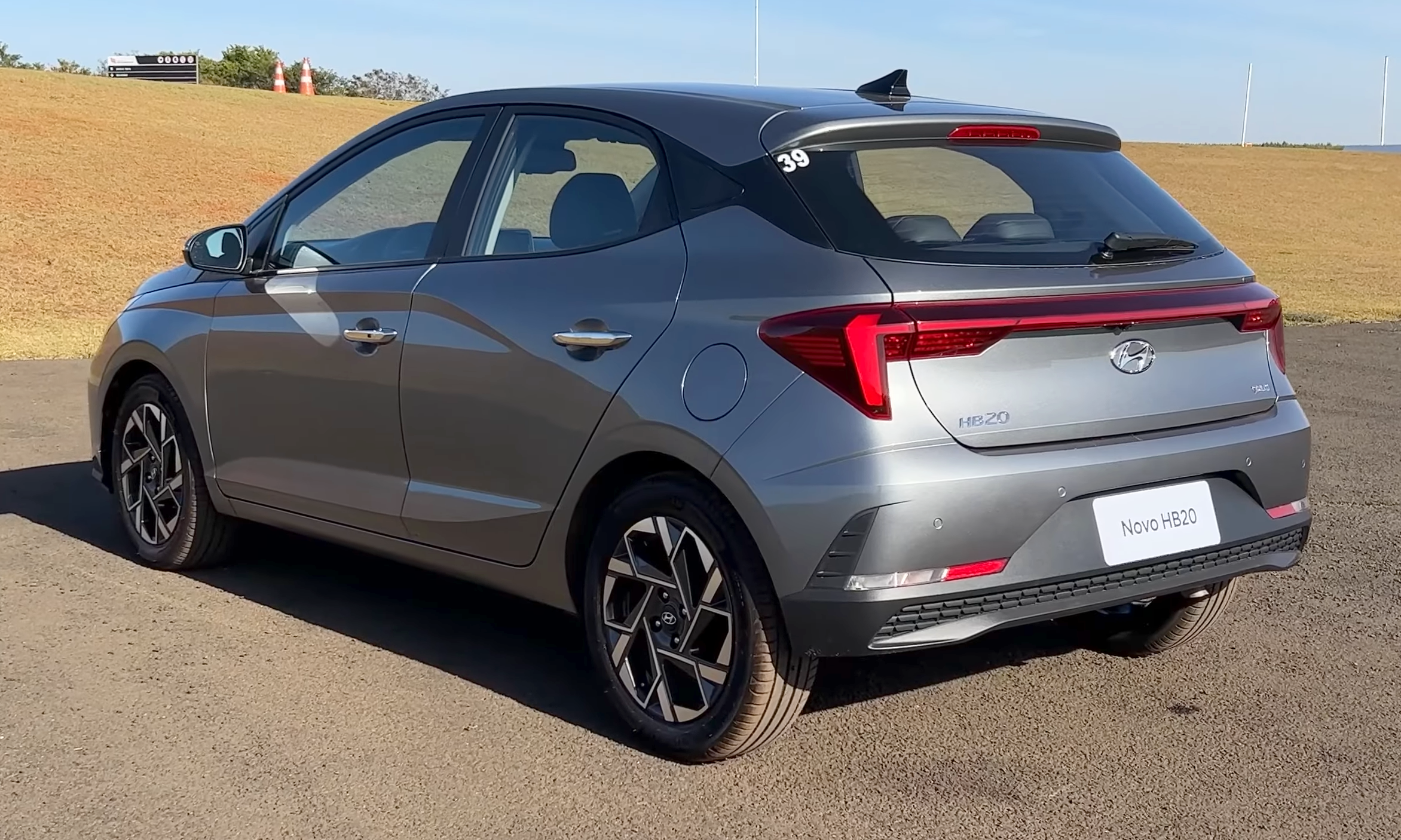
Rear view

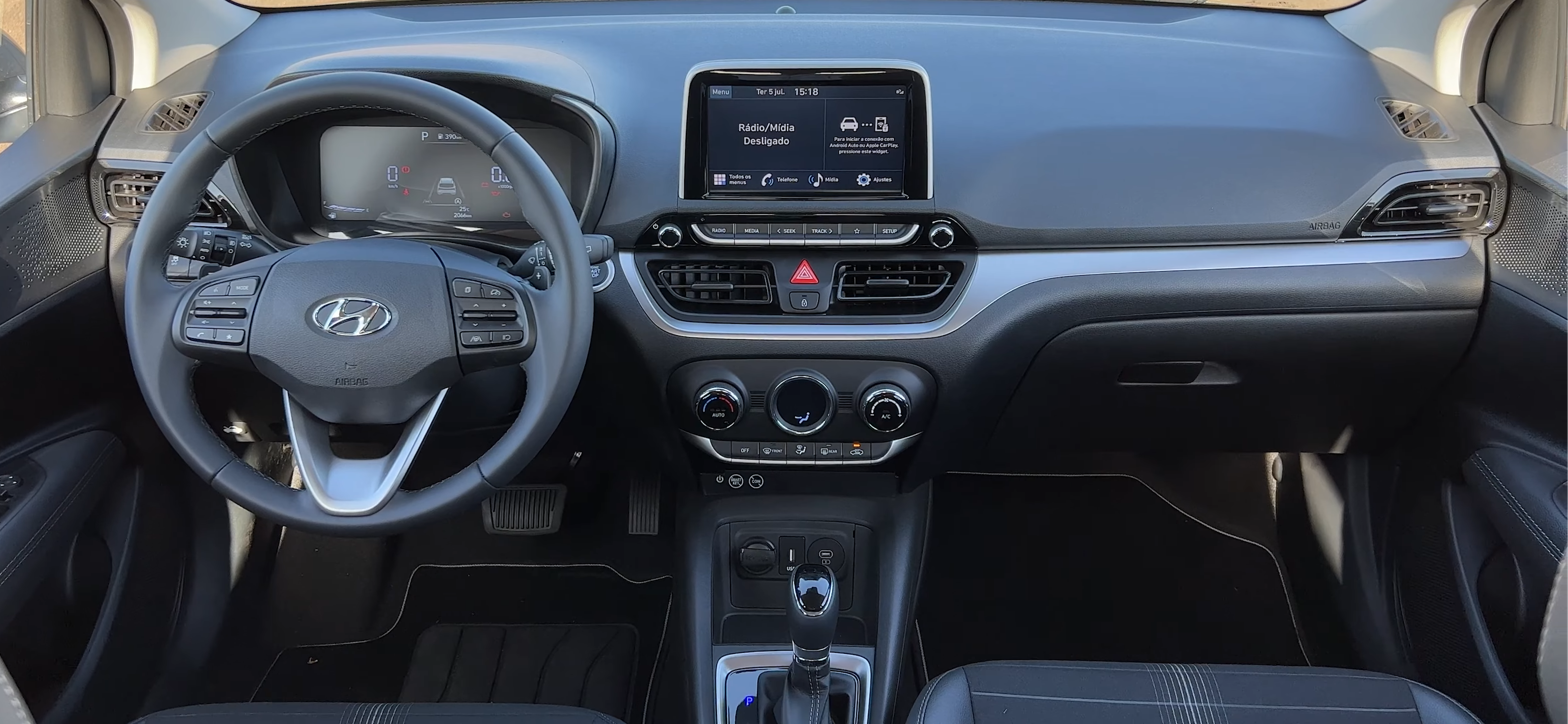
Interior

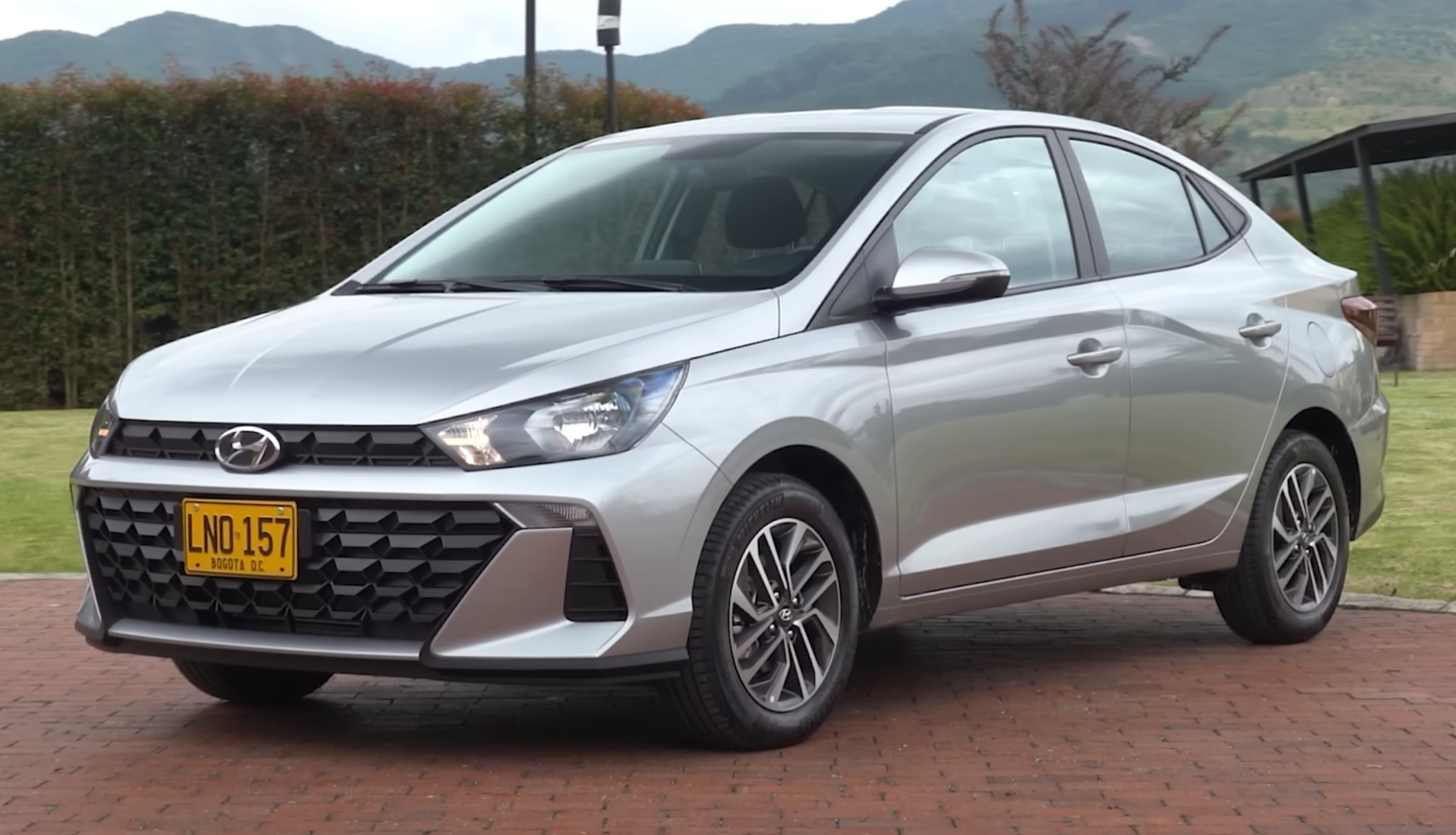
Hyundai HB20S (Colombia, facelift)

=== Safety ===
The most basic version for Latin America with 2 airbags and ESC received 1 star for adult occupants and 3 stars for toddlers from Latin NCAP 2.0 in 2019.

Latin NCAP 2.0 test results Hyundai HB20 Hatchback + 2 Airbags (2019, based on Euro NCAP 2008)
Test	Points	Stars
Adult occupant:	21.97/34.0	1 /5 stars
Child occupant:	29.64/49.00	3 /5 stars

The most basic version for Latin America with 2 airbags, driver pretensioner and no ESC received 0 stars from Latin NCAP 3.0 in 2020 (similar to Euro NCAP 2014).

Latin NCAP 3.0 test results Hyundai HB20 + 2 Airbags (2020, similar to Euro NCAP 2014)
Test	Points	%
Overall:	0 /5 stars	
Adult occupant:	7.63	19%
Child occupant:	4.75	10%
Pedestrian:	20.52	43%
Safety assist:	6.00	14%

The most basic version for Latin America of the facelifted HB20 with 6 airbags, airbag switch, driver pretensioner, front load limiters, ESC and speed assist received 3 stars from Latin NCAP 3.0 in 2023 (similar to Euro NCAP 2014).

Latin NCAP 3.5 test results Hyundai New HB20 + 6 Airbags (2023, similar to Euro NCAP 2017)
Test	Points	%
Overall:	3 /5 stars	
Adult occupant:	27.32	68%
Child occupant:	36.68	75%
Pedestrian:	16.47	34%
Safety assist:	28.00	65%

== Sales ==
Year	Brazil (Note: Figures include both the HB20 and HB20S (sold from 2013 onwards).)	Mexico (Note: Sales figures include both the Sedan and Hatchback bodystyles.)	Colombia (Note: Sales figures include both the HB20S Accent and HB20 Getz.)
2012	22,053		
2013	157,704		
2014	179,728		
2015	162,801		
2016	167,629		
2017	137,777		
2018	137,677		
2019	136,490		
2020	110,555		
2021	112,034		
2022	121,684	1,320	
2023	119,190	9,799	2,436
2024	134,398	5,351	
2025	121,983		
