= List of automobiles manufactured in Brazil =

This article is a list of automobiles manufactured in Brazil (1950–2022).

== 1950s ==
- 1956 – Romi-Isetta
- 1956 – DKW-Vemag Universal F-91
- 1957 – Kombi – Volkswagen
- 1957 – Ford F-100 – Ford
- 1957 – Jeep Willys
- 1958 – DKW-Vemag Sedan
- 1958 – DKW-Vemag Candango
- 1958 – Chevrolet Brasil 3100 – Chevrolet
- 1958 – Rural Willys
- 1959 – Volkswagen Sedan – Volkswagen
- 1959 – Simca Chambord
- 1959 – Willys Renault Dauphine

== 1960s ==
- 1960 – Aero-Willys
- 1961 – FNM 2000 JK
- 1961 – Willys Interlagos
- 1962 – Karmann-Ghia – Volkswagen
- 1962 – Willys Renault Gordini
- 1964 – Veraneio – Chevrolet
- 1964 – GT Malzoni Lumimari/Puma
- 1965 – Brasinca GT 4200 Uirapuru
- 1966 – FNM 2000 TIMB
- 1966 – FNM Onça 2150
- 1966 – Puma GT
- 1966 – Simca Esplanada
- 1966 – Willys Itamaraty
- 1967 – Galaxie – Ford
- 1968 – Corcel – Ford
- 1968 – Opala – Chevrolet
- 1969 – VW 1600, Variant, TL – Volkswagen
- 1969 – Dodge Dart – Dodge

== 1970s ==
- 1970 – Ford Belina – Ford
- 1970 – Puma GTE – Puma
- 1971 – Dodge Charger –
- 1973 – Ford Maverick Super Luxo
- 1974 – Brasília – Volkswagen
- 1974 – Passat – Volkswagen
- 1975 – Alfa Romeo 2300 – FNM (Fábrica Nacional de Motores)
- 1975 – Itaipu – Gurgel
- 1975 – Chevrolet Caravan – Chevrolet
- 1975 – Landau – Ford
- 1976 – Fiat 147 – Fiat
- 1977 – Fiat 147 Pick-up – Fiat
- 1977 – “VW” Miura – Volkswagen
- 1978 – SM 4.1 – Santa Matilde
- 1978 – Ventura – L’Automobile
- 1979 – Chrysler-Dodge Magnum e Le Baron
- 1979 – Dardo

== 1980s ==
- 1980 – Gol – Volkswagen
- 1980 – Panorama C – Fiat
- 1980 – Fiorino – Fiat
- 1981 – Del Rey – Ford
- 1988 – E500 – Gurgel
- 1981 – Voyage – Volkswagen
- 1981 – 147 C – Fiat
- 1982 – Parati – Volkswagen
- 1982 – Saveiro – Volkswagen
- 1982 – Monza – Chevrolet
- 1982 – Pampa – Ford
- 1982 – Fiorino Furgão – Fiat
- 1983 – Escort – Ford
- 1983 – Oggi – Fiat
- 1984 – 4 – Engesa
- 1984 – Carajás – Gurgel
- 1984 – Uno – Fiat
- 1984 – Santana – Volkswagen
- 1984 – Hofstetter Turbo – Hofstetter
- 1985 – Alfa Romeo TI4 – Fiat
- 1985 – D-20 – Chevrolet
- 1985 – Fiat Prêmio – Fiat
- 1986 – Fiat Elba – Fiat
- 1988 – BR-800 – Gurgel
- 1988 – Uno Pick-up – Fiat
- 1989 – Javali – CBT
- 1989 – Camper – Envemo
- 1989 – Elba CLS – Fiat
- 1989 – Ipanema – Chevrolet
- 1989 – Kadett – Chevrolet
- 1989 – Verona – Ford

== 1990s ==
- 1990 – Uno Mille – Fiat
- 1991 – Tempra – Fiat
- 1991 – Versailles – Ford
- 1991 – Uno Mille Brio – Fiat
- 1991 – Elba Weekend – Fiat
- 1992 – Omega – Chevrolet
- 1992 – Supermini – Gurgel
- 1992 – Uno Mille Electronic – Fiat
- 1993 – Logus – Volkswagen
- 1993 – Tipo – Fiat
- 1993 – Tempra 16v – Fiat
- 1993 – Vectra – Chevrolet
- 1994 – Pointer – Volkswagen
- 1994 – Corsa – Chevrolet
- 1994 – Uno Turbo – Fiat
- 1994 – Uno Mille ELX – Fiat
- 1995 – S-10 – Chevrolet
- 1995 – Pick-up Trekking – Fiat
- 1996 – Palio – Fiat
- 1996 – Ford Fiesta – Ford
- 1997 – Blazer – Chevrolet
- 1997 – Siena – Fiat
- 1997 – Palio Weekend – Fiat
- 1997 – Ka – Ford
- 1998 – Marea – Fiat
- 1998 – Dodge Dakota – Fiat
- 1998 – Corolla – Toyota
- 1999 – Strada Cabine Estendida – Fiat
- 1999 – Palio Adventure – Fiat
- 1999 – Palio Weekend – Fiat
- 1999 – Brava – Fiat
- 1999 – Palio Citymatic – Fiat
- 1999 – Renault Clio – Renault

== 2000s ==
- 2000 – Chevrolet Celta – GM
- 2000 – Ducato – Fiat
- 2001 – Fiat Doblò – Fiat
- 2001 – Uno Mille Fire – Fiat
- 2001 – Pick-up Strada Adventure – Fiat
- 2001 – Troller – Troller
- 2001 – 206 – PSA Porto Real
- 2001 – Fiat Stilo – Fiat
- 2002 – C3 – PSA Porto Real
- 2003 – Chevrolet Montana – GM
- 2003 – EcoSport – Ford
- 2003 – Volkswagen Fox – Volkswagen
- 2003 – Honda Fit – Honda
- 2003 – Marruá – Agrale
- 2005 – Idea – Fiat
- 2005 – H1 – Lobini
- 2006 – Pantanal – Troller
- 2006 – Chevrolet Prisma – GM
- 2007 – Fiat Punto – Fiat
- 2007 – Dacia Logan – Renault
- 2008 – Dacia Sandero – Renault
- 2009 – Fiat Linea – Fiat
- 2009 – Nissan Livina – Nissan
- 2009 – Stark – TAC

== 2010s ==
* 2010 – Citroën C3 Aircross
- 2010 – Fiat Bravo – Fiat
- 2010 – Fiat Uno – Fiat
- 2010 – Etios – Toyota
- 2010 – Peugeot Hoggar
- 2011 – Chevrolet Agile – GM
- 2011 – Chevrolet Cruze – GM
- 2010 – Citroën C3 Picasso – PSA (Porto Real)
- 2011 – Duster – Renault
- 2012 – Chevrolet Cobalt – GM
- 2012 – Chevrolet Onix – GM
- 2012 – Chevrolet Spin – GM
- 2012 – TrailBlazer – GM
- 2012 – Hyundai HB20 – Hyundai
- 2016 – Fiat Mobi – Fiat
- 2016 – Fiat Toro – Fiat
- 2017 – Fiat Argo – Fiat
- 2018 – Fiat Cronos – Fiat

== 2020s ==
2021
- 2021 – Fiat Pulse – Stellantis
- 2021 – Fiat Toro – Stellantis
- 2021 – Fiat Argo – Stellantis
- 2021 – Fiat Uno – Stellantis
- 2021 – Fiat Mobi – Stellantis
- 2021 – Fiat Strada – Stellantis
- 2021 – Fiat Doblò – Stellantis
- 2021 – Fiat Grand Siena – Stellantis
- 2021 – Fiat Fiorino – Stellantis
- 2021 – Jeep Compass – Stellantis
- 2021 – Jeep Commander – Stellantis
- 2021 – Jeep Renegade – Stellantis
- 2021 – Peugeot 2008 – Stellantis
- 2021 – Citroën C3 – Stellantis
- 2021 – Citroën Aircross – Stellantis
- 2021 – Citroën C4 Cactus – Stellantis
- 2021 – Ford Ka – Ford
- 2021 – Ford EcoSport – Ford
- 2021 – Troller T4 – Troller
- 2021 – Suzuki Jimny – HPE Automotores
- 2021 – Mitsubishi L200 – HPE
- 2021 – Mitsubishi Eclipse Cross – HPE
- 2021 – Outlander Sport/ASX – HPE
- 2021 – Hyundai HB20 – Hyundai
- 2021 – Hyundai HB20X – Hyundai
- 2021 – Hyundai HB20S – Hyundai
- 2021 – Hyundai Creta – Hyundai
- 2021 – Land Rover Discovery – Land Rover
- 2021 – Nissan Kicks – Nissan
- 2021 – Nissan V-Drive – Nissan
- 2021 – Renault Sandero – Renault
- 2021 – Renault Logan – Renault
- 2021 – Renault Duster – Renault
- 2021 – Renault Duster Oroch – Renault
- 2021 – Renault Captur – Renault
- 2021 – Renault Kwid – Renault
- 2021 – Toyota Corolla – Toyota
- 2021 – Toyota Corolla Cross – Toyota
- 2021 – Toyota Etios – Toyota
- 2021 – Toyota Yaris – Toyota
- 2021 – Volkswagen Polo – Volkswagen
- 2021 – Volkswagen up! – Volkswagen
- 2021 – Volkswagen Virtus – Volkswagen
- 2021 – Volkswagen Nivus – Volkswagen
- 2021 – Volkswagen Saveiro – Volkswagen
- 2021 – Volkswagen T-Cross – Volkswagen
- 2021 – Volkswagen Gol – Volkswagen
- 2021 – Volkswagen Fox – Volkswagen
- 2021 – Volkswagen Voyage – Volkswagen
- 2021 – Honda Fit – Honda
- 2021 – Honda HR-V – Honda
- 2021 – Honda WR-V – Honda
- 2021 – Honda City – Honda
- 2021 – Honda Civic – Honda
- 2021 – Chevrolet Joy – Chevrolet
- 2021 – Chevrolet Tracker – Chevrolet
- 2021 – Chevrolet Spin – Chevrolet
- 2021 – Chevrolet S10 – Chevrolet
- 2021 – Chevrolet Montana – Chevrolet
- 2021 – Chevrolet Trailblazer – Chevrolet
- 2021 – Chevrolet Onix – Chevrolet
- 2021 – Chery Tiggo 2 – Caoa (Chery)
- 2021 – Chery Tiggo 3x – Caoa
- 2021 – Chery Tiggo 5x – Caoa
- 2021 – Chery Tiggo 7 – Caoa
- 2021 – Chery Tiggo 8 – Caoa
- 2021 – Chery Arrizo 5 – Caoa
- 2021 – Chery Arrizo 6 Pro – Caoa
- 2021 – Hyundai ix35 – Caoa (Hyundai)
- 2021 – Hyundai Tucson – Caoa
- 2021 – Hyundai Creta – Caoa
- 2021 – Hyundai HR – Caoa
- 2021 – Hyundai HD 80 – Caoa
- 2021 – BMW 3 Series – BMW
- 2021 – BMW X1 – BMW
- 2021 – BMW X3 – BMW
- 2021 – BMW X4 – BMW

2022

- 2022 – Fiat Pulse – Stellantis
- 2022 – Fiat Toro – Stellantis
- 2022 – Fiat Argo – Stellantis
- 2022 – Fiat Mobi – Stellantis
- 2022 – Fiat Strada – Stellantis
- 2022 – Fiat Fiorino – Stellantis
- 2022 – Jeep Compass – Stellantis
- 2022 – Jeep Commander – Stellantis
- 2022 – Jeep Renegade – Stellantis
- 2022 – Peugeot 2008 – Stellantis
- 2022 – Citroën C3 – Stellantis
- 2022 – Citroën C4 Cactus – Stellantis
- 2022 – Mitsubishi L200 – HPE Automotores
- 2022 – Mitsubishi Eclipse Cross – HPE
- 2022 – Hyundai HB20 – Hyundai
- 2022 – Hyundai HB20S – Hyundai
- 2022 – Hyundai Creta – Hyundai
- 2022 – Land Rover Discovery – Land Rover
- 2022 – Nissan Kicks – Nissan
- 2022 – Renault Duster – Renault
- 2022 – Renault Oroch – Renault
- 2022 – Renault Captur – Renault
- 2022 – Renault Kwid – Renault
- 2022 – Toyota Corolla – Toyota
- 2022 – Toyota Corolla Cross – Toyota
- 2022 – Toyota Etios – Toyota
- 2022 – Toyota Yaris – Toyota
- 2022 – Volkswagen Polo – Volkswagen
- 2022 – Volkswagen Virtus – Volkswagen
- 2022 – Volkswagen Nivus – Volkswagen
- 2022 – Volkswagen Saveiro – Volkswagen
- 2022 – Volkswagen T-Cross – Volkswagen
- 2022 – Volkswagen Gol – Volkswagen
- 2022 – Volkswagen Voyage – Volkswagen
- 2022 – Honda HR-V – Honda
- 2022 – Honda WR-V – Honda
- 2022 – Honda City – Honda
- 2022 – Chevrolet Tracker – Chevrolet
- 2022 – Chevrolet Spin – Chevrolet
- 2022 – Chevrolet S10 – Chevrolet
- 2022 – Chevrolet Montana – Chevrolet
- 2022 – Chevrolet Trailblazer – Chevrolet
- 2022 – Chevrolet Onix – Chevrolet
- 2022 – Chery Tiggo 5x Pro – Caoa (Chery)
- 2022 – Chery Tiggo 7 Pro – Caoa
- 2022 – Chery Tiggo 8 Pro – Caoa
- 2022 – Chery Arrizo 5 – Caoa
- 2022 – Hyundai HR – Caoa (Hyundai)
- 2022 – Hyundai HD 80 – Caoa
- 2022 – BMW 3 Series – BMW
- 2022 – BMW X1 – BMW
- 2022 – BMW X3 – BMW
- 2022 – BMW X4 – BMW

== See also ==
- List of automobile manufacturers
- List of automobile marques.
- List of current automobile manufacturers by country
- List of current automobile marques
- Timeline of motor vehicle brands
- Automotive industry in Brazil
