= João do Amaral Gurgel =

Brazilian businessman

João Augusto Amaral Gurgel
- Born: João Augusto Conrado do Amaral Gurgel; 26 March 1926; Franca, São Paulo, Brazil
- Died: 30 January 2009 (aged 82); São Paulo, Brazil
- Education: Polytechnic School of the University of São Paulo
- Occupations: Engineer, Entrepreneur
- Years active: 1948-1996
- Title: Founder of Gurgel

João Augusto Conrado do Amaral Gurgel (March 26, 1926 – January 30, 2009) was a Brazilian engineer and businessman. He founded Gurgel Motores, a Brazilian automobile manufacturer, in 1969, with the aim of producing vehicles entirely made in Brazil. The company's initial models featured fiberglass bodies mounted on Volkswagen Beetle (Fusca) chassis and machinery.

During the São Paulo International Motor Show in 1974, Gurgel presented the Itaipu, a two-seater minicar that became the first electric vehicle developed in Latin America. Later on, he introduced the BR-800, the first fully designed and manufactured car made in Brazil.

However, Gurgel faced challenges over the years and eventually ceased operations in 1996.

== Career ==
Ever since his youth, João Gurgel had a steadfast vision of establishing a thriving automobile industry in Brazil. This vision took root during his college years when he presented a groundbreaking concept for a small two-cylinder vehicle named Tião, defying expectations despite initially being assigned a crane project. Building on his passion and drive, he gained invaluable experience working at renowned companies like Buick Motor Company and General Motors Company. In 1958, fueled by his unwavering commitment, he founded Moplast Moldagem de Plásticos, initially focusing on the production of illuminated signs.In 1964, João Gurgel went on to establish Macan Indústria e Comércio Ltda, a Volkswagen dealership that specialized in manufacturing go-karts, mini-cars, and an industrial transporter called Mocar. Then, on September 1, 1969, he took a significant step by founding Gurgel Motores (Gurgel Motors), driven by a primary objective of advancing national automotive technologies. The company garnered acclaim for its innovative fiberglass-bodied vehicles. While João Gurgel had reservations about utilizing sugarcane ethanol as fuel, he did produce a limited number of vehicles equipped with alcohol-based engines. However, the majority of Gurgel vehicles operated on gasoline, reflecting his belief in prioritizing land use for food production rather than fuel.

== Bankruptcy ==
João Gurgel's bankruptcy can be attributed to a series of business decisions and the implementation of new government policies in Brazil starting from March 1990. Prior to this period, during Brazil's era of total protectionism from 1969 to 1989, Gurgel enjoyed success and held a significant market share in the Brazilian Jeep industry. In the late 1980s, then-President José Sarney granted Gurgel a substantial loan from a state bank without the need for collateral. Moreover, Gurgel received special tax benefits for their small car, the Gurgel BR-800. However, with the changes in government policies and the opening up of the Brazilian market, Gurgel faced challenges that ultimately led to its bankruptcy.

Gurgel faced significant challenges when President Fernando Collor assumed office in March 1990. Collor implemented reforms that opened up the Brazilian car market to foreign manufacturers. Despite the high import tax rate of 85%, the Gurgel Carajás became more expensive than the Lada Niva. Consequently, Gurgel's SUV models struggled in the market, leading to the discontinuation of Gurgel Carajás production in January 1991. In the same year, President Fernando Collor reduced the IPI (a Brazilian value-added tax) for the Fiat Uno Mille to 20% and applied the same tax rate to the Gurgel BR-800.

== Comparisons ==
By any measure, the Fiat Uno Mille, a 1000cc car, offered greater power and spaciousness compared to the Gurgel BR-800. Despite having similar prices, the sales of the BR-800 sharply declined to almost nothing in 1990. In an attempt to revitalize their lineup, Gurgel introduced the Gurgel Supermini in 1992, which was based on the BR-800 model. However, the Supermini experienced extremely low sales. Although Fernando Collor refused to provide an unsecured loan of approximately US$80,000,000 from BNDES to Gurgel, the company managed to secure two loans from state governments. One loan was obtained from BEC, the bank of the Brazilian state of Ceará, while the other loan came from Banespa, the bank of the Brazilian state of São Paulo. It's worth noting that neither loan had any collateral backing. Despite receiving these substantial loans, Gurgel's sales remained consistently small, and in fact, continued to decline from 1990 to 1993. Only around 1,500 Supermini Gurgel cars were produced between 1992 and 1993.

In 1995, Gurgel officially declared bankruptcy, with its assets representing less than 3% of its total debt. The company's assets were insufficient to cover the payment of its former employees. According to the Brazilian website Jornal do Carro, Gurgel's debt was estimated to be approximately US$1,200,000,000. From 1969 to 1993, Gurgel introduced around 12 new vehicle models. However, with the exception of the "Xavante X" and a series primarily produced in the 1970s, none of Gurgel's products achieved significant commercial success. The "Tocantins" model underwent a transformation and became the "Gurgel Carajás," which initially held a dominant position in Brazil's off-road vehicle market until 1990. However, the Carajás SUV faced significant issues and was priced higher than its competitors. When the importation of the Lada Niva was authorized by Fernando Collor in 1990, the Gurgel Carajás quickly ceased production within a few months. The Lada Niva gained the majority of the Carajás' market share, despite being subject to an 85% import tax in 1990. The Lada Niva offered superior quality and affordability compared to the Gurgel Carajás, and it was a genuine 4x4 drive vehicle, while all of Gurgel's SUVs were 4x2. Both the Gurgel BR-800 and Gurgel Supermini were inferior to Fiat's Uno Mille, offering less space, power, and comfort.

== Controversy ==
Even to this day, João Gurgel maintains a following of supporters who claim that he was driven to bankruptcy by politicians. From 1976 to 1990, it was illegal to import jeeps or any other type of vehicle in Brazil. Even in 1990, the import tax for a jeep in Brazil was around 85%. Up until Gurgel's bankruptcy, the Brazilian press provided unwavering support to João Gurgel. He was consistently praised and celebrated by the media for over two decades. His vehicles were expensive, largely due to the fact that they were essentially handmade. The Brazilian press often referred to João Gurgel as the potential Brazilian equivalent of Henry Ford. He was also a popular figure. In 1987-1988, he launched a campaign to raise money from partners, offering shares for approximately US$4,500.00. These new shareholders were promised to be the first owners of the new car that would be produced by his company (the BR-800 model), and they did indeed receive their BR-800 cars.

João Gurgel, while highly regarded for his engineering prowess, faced challenges in managing his business, which ultimately resulted in significant financial consequences. According to sources, his default in 1994 amounted to an estimated US$1.2 billion, impacting various stakeholders including suppliers of vehicle parts and employees who were left unpaid.

== Later life and death ==
In 2003, the industrial property registration of Gurgel Motors expired, and the brand was acquired by businessman Paulo Emílio Freire Lemos in April 2004 for R$ 850.00. During the acquisition, João Gurgel's family claims they were not consulted and decided to take legal action against Lemos. However, since there were no legal impediments for a new registration, the family lost the case.

Subsequently, Lemos attempted to relaunch the Gurgel X-12 but was unsuccessful. Instead, he imported a diesel-powered tricycle from China specifically designed for rural use. Currently, under Lemos' ownership, Gurgel operates solely as an importer of a diesel tricycle known as the TA-01. The vehicle resembles a small pickup truck, featuring a two-seater cabin, a tilting cargo bed capable of carrying loads up to 1200 kilograms, and a maximum speed of 60 kilometers per hour. With the exception of the body and cabin, all other parts of the vehicle are imported and assembled at a facility located in Presidente Prudente.

João Gurgel died on January 30, 2009, at the age of 82, at his residence in São Paulo, following an 8-year battle with Alzheimer's disease. He was survived by his spouse and three children.
