= List of microcars by country of origin: B =

== List ==
Country	Automobile Name	Manufacturer	Engine Make/Capacity	Seats	Year	Other information
Belgium	Flandria	Ateliers Claeys, Zedelgem	ILO		1955	Prototype shown at the annual motorshow in Brussels
Brazil	Gurgel Itaipu	Gurgel	electric motor 10 kW (13 hp)		1981-1983	
Brazil	Gurgel Moplast	Gurgel				
Brazil	Romi Isetta	Romi, Santa Bárbara d'Oeste	Iso SpA 200 cc or BMW 300 cc	2	1956-1961	Brazilian built version of the Italian Iso Isetta
