= E500 =

E500 can refer to:

- Alexander Dennis Enviro500, a tri-axle double-decker bus from Alexander Dennis
- E number 500, a food additive
- Eclipse 500, a business jet aeroplane
- Error 500, an "Internal Server Error" on a HTTP-Server
- Gurgel E500, an electric vehicle produced in Brazil
- Mercedes-Benz E500, a luxury sports sedan automobile
- Olympus E-500, a digital SLR camera
- PowerPC e500, a microprocessor core from Freescale
- Sharp PC-E500S, a pocket computer by Sharp Corporation
