= Gurgel Delta =

The Gurgel Delta was a Brazilian car designed by Gurgel, never sold in commercial market.

The project was described by Gurgel himself as the true popular car, citing Supermini as "a small car, economic and easy to park, for who do not set comfort aside".

Compared to Supermini, Delta had new gearboxes (made by machinery acquired by Gurgel from Citroën), front wheel drive (no drive shaft), weighing 550 kg. Just a few prototypes of Gurgel Delta were produced.

== Sources ==
- Delta photos and text (in Portuguese)
