= Gurgel =

Brazilian automobile manufacturer (1969–1996)

Gurgel Motores
- Industry: Automotive
- Founded: 1 September 1969; 56 years ago
- Founder: João Augusto Amaral Gurgel
- Defunct: 30 September 1996; 29 years ago
- Headquarters: Rio Claro, São Paulo, Brazil
- Area served: Latin America
- Products: Automobiles, commercial vehicles
- Number of employees: 1,150 (1989)

Gurgel Motores (Portuguese pronunciation: [ɡuʁˈʒɛw]) was a Brazilian automobile manufacturer, named after its founder João do Amaral Gurgel. The company was founded in 1969 and first specialised in buggies and off-road vehicles. Early models were fiberglass bodies installed on Volkswagen Beetle chassis and machinery, but VW bodies and chassis were later replaced by bodies made of Plasteel, or steel joined with fiberglass through a process patented by Gurgel.

Gurgel made the first car to be fully designed and manufactured in Brazil, the BR-800.

== History ==
=== Rise and growth (1969–1987) ===
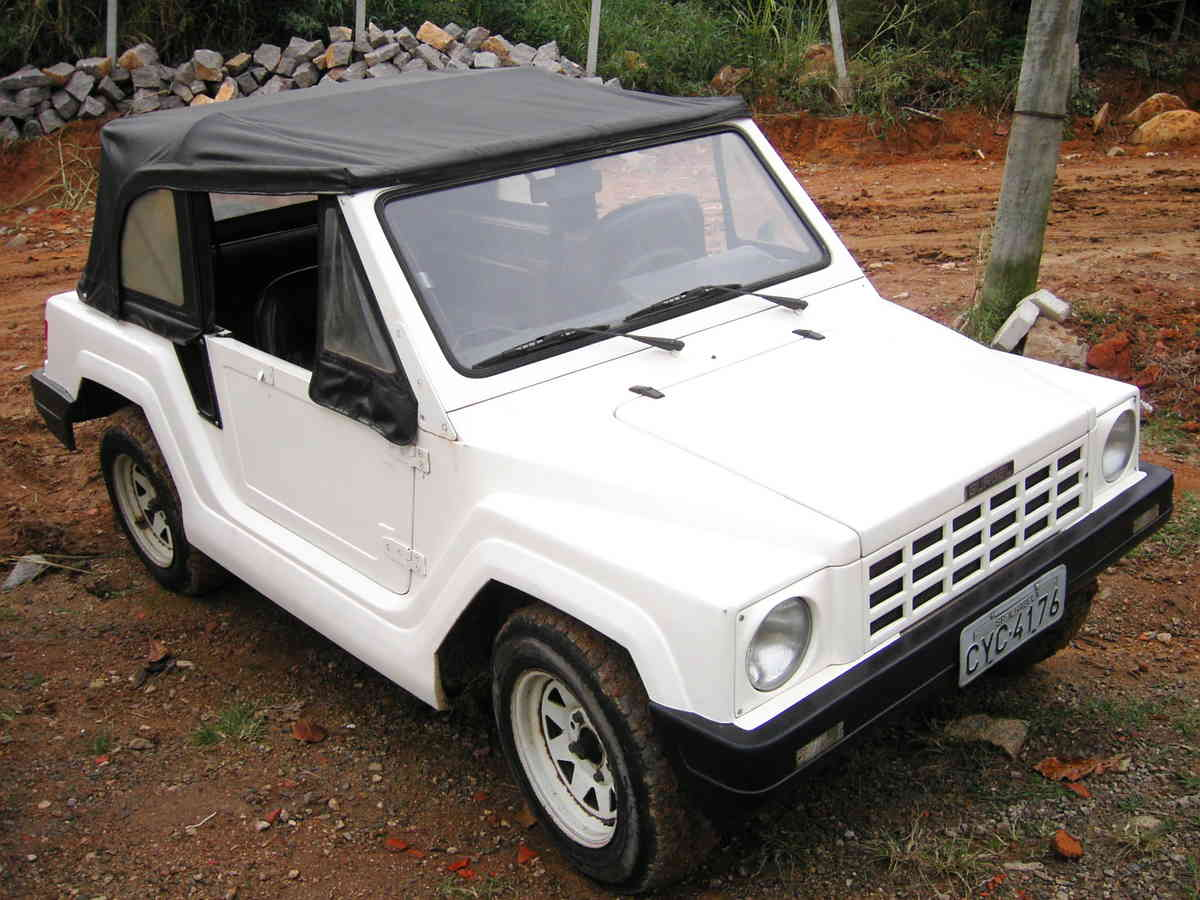
A Gurgel jeep

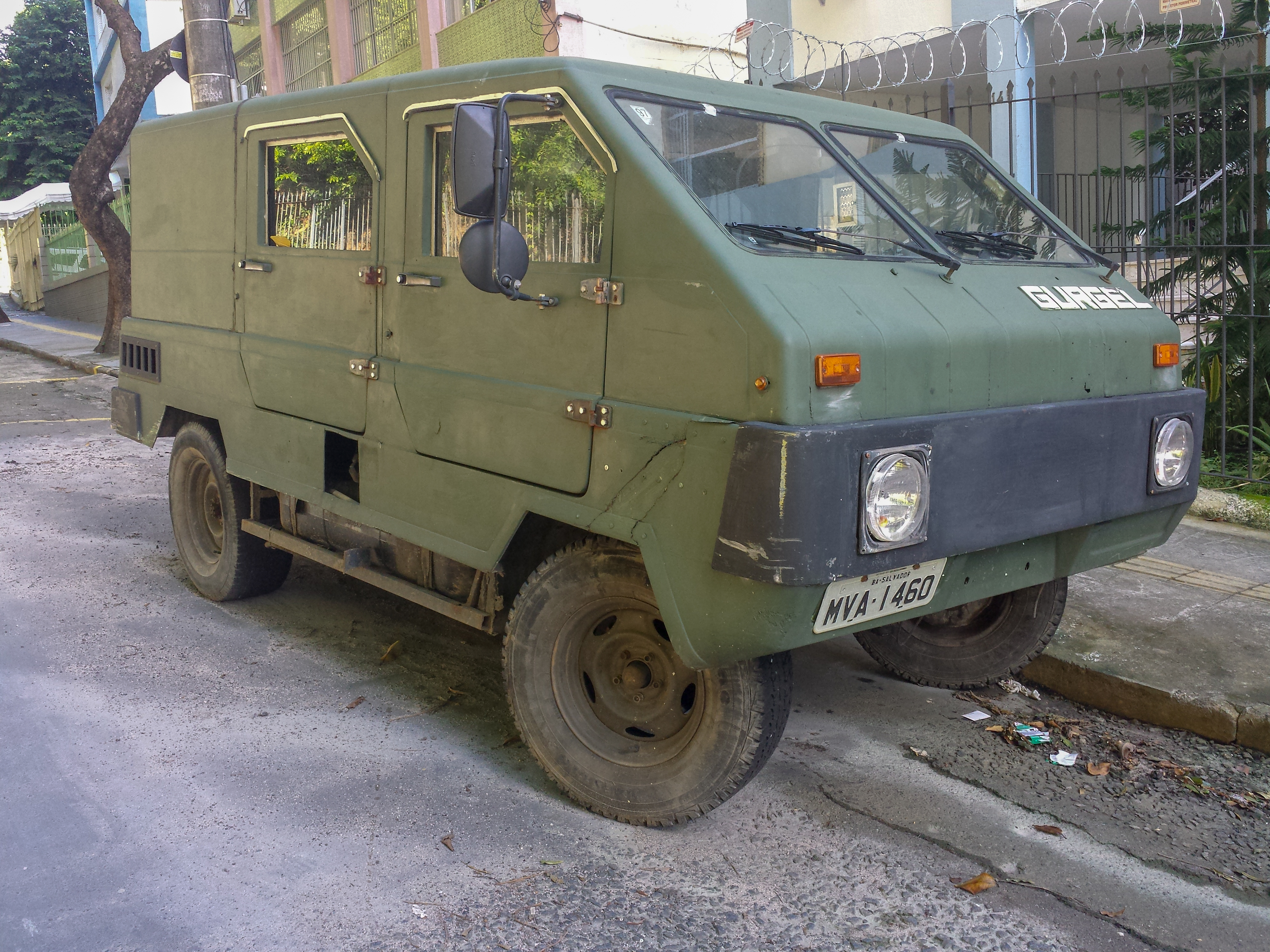
Gurgel G15

The Ipanema was the first car produced by Gurgel, introducing the brand in the market. The next model was the first commercial success of the brand: the Xavante (also named X-10): production started in 1973, being the first car of Gurgel developed using the Plasteel system, which was proved very resistant under corrosive environments and also very mechanically strong, deforming temporarily but not smashing under pressure or shocks. Xavante also had a feature called Selectraction, a system where two individual hand-brakes were installed next to the driver, for each one of the rear wheels. In a situation of low-traction environment, it could be used to stop a free-spinning wheel and move the power to the other one, allowing the driver to restore traction to the ground and to move along. There was a more sophisticated version of X-10 called X-12, which was the biggest commercial success of the brand.

In 1974, the Itaipu was a pioneer project of an electric vehicle, which was developed to be a strict urban car for short distances. However, due to the limited technology of the batteries of that time – they were too heavy and had low capacity – the project was halted. Still, in 1980 another electric vehicle was conceived, called Itaipu E400: it was a van, still designed for urban travels, but making a better autonomy and still a remarkable mileage. The same body was also listed in brochures as available with a petrol engine, as the "G-800".

In 1979, the X-15 was released, being a van which could carry 7 passengers, or 2 passengers plus 500 kg of load. A derived model, the G-15L, could carry 1 ton of load, having 70L of gasoline capacity, which could be extended to 140L, with an additional tank.

At that time, business was going quite well: Gurgel was the first exporter in special vehicles, and the second in production and amount, in 1977 and 1978.

In 1981, the XEF model was developed, having only three front seats, an unusual solution at the time. The car was an urban model, with small dimensions for the passengers and for the luggage.

In 1984, the Carajás model was introduced: it presented the same Selectraction system as Xavante and X-12, but had some special qualities, such as the TTS (Tork Tubing System), used to transfer the power from the engine, on the front of the vehicle, to the transmission, on the rear. The system gave a good weight balance for the system, but presented some collateral effects, such as the need for a slower shift change, due to the inertia of the TTS.

=== Urban vehicles (1987–1993) ===
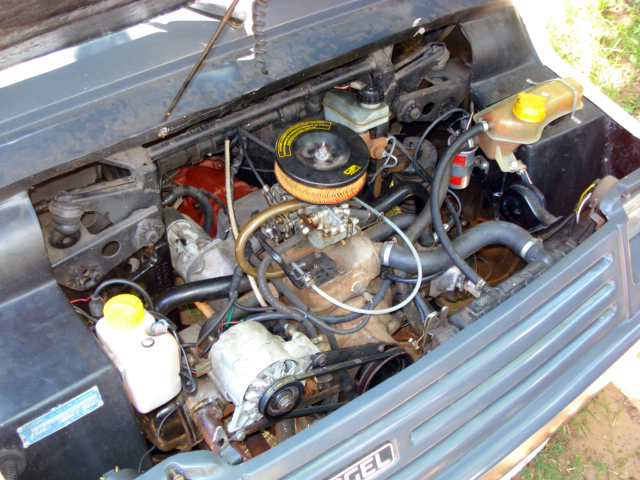
Enertron engine, installed in the very first BR800

A small, economic, and totally national car was the goal for João Gurgel for a long time. On September 7 of 1987, a day Gurgel himself called "the day of the Brazilian technological independence", the project CENA was presented. The first minicar of the brand was designed to be the cheaper and more economic car offered in the market. For this project, a tax benefit was granted, reducing the IPI to 5%, aiming at increasing competitiveness with big automakers.

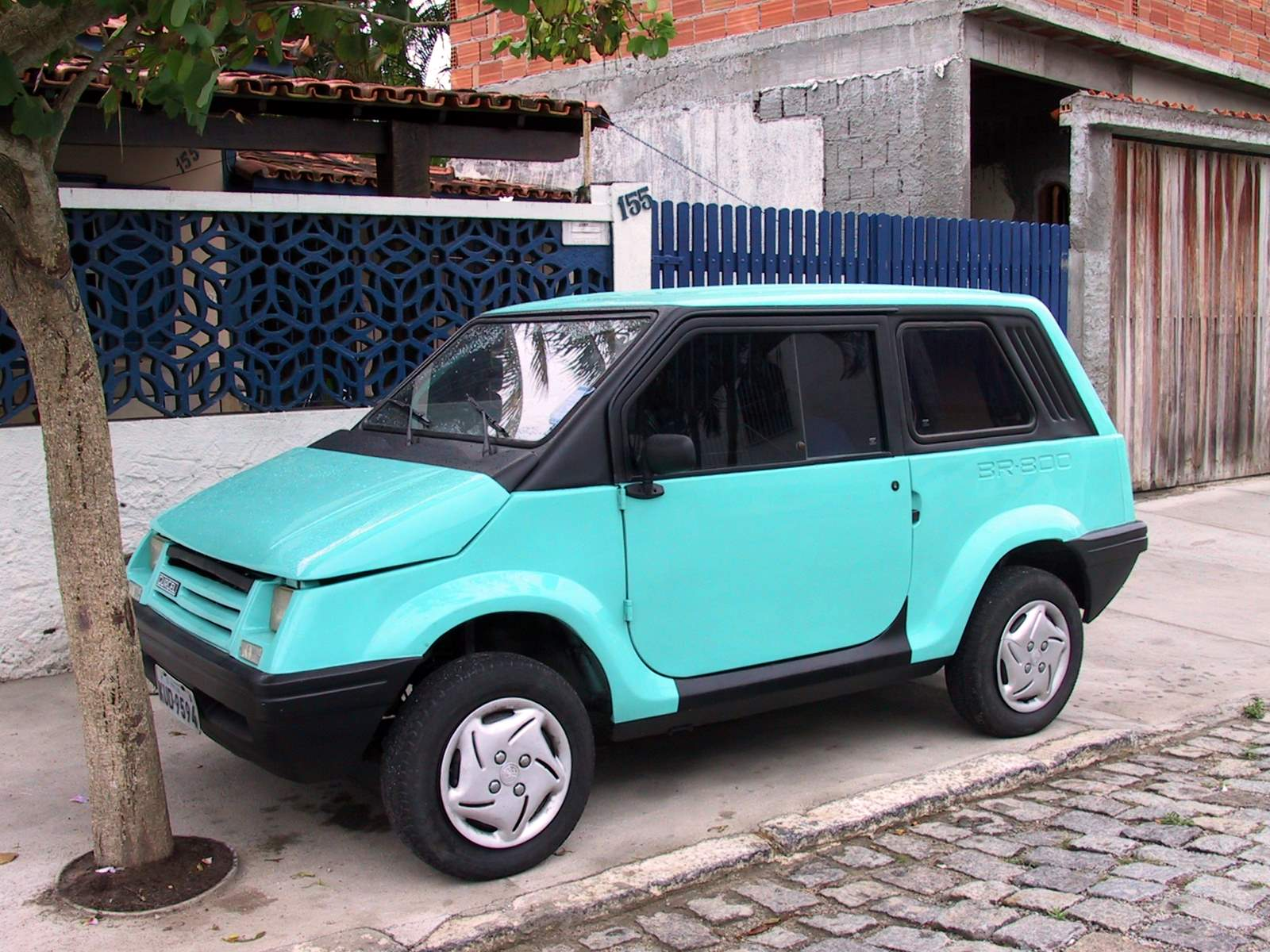
Gurgel BR-800

The car presented a big step in the national technology development: the engine, named Gurgel Enertron, was entirely designed and developed by Gurgel, low cost : it was a bi-cylindrical engine, originally with 650 cc and 800 cc options, equipped with totally electronic ignition control, using a system with two coils and no distributor. It had a good mileage, making 14 km/L on urban traffic, and could achieve 19 km/L on the road, on constant speed, even without any electronic fuel injection.

The engine was very similar to the VW Beetle boxer engine, even sharing some internal parts with it, but had many improvements: a sealed water-cooled system, better compression ratio and a different ignition system. Unlike the VW boxer, it could be taken to near 6000 rpm without any valve float.

The first model based on the original project was the BR-800, available only with the 800 cc engine option, generating 32 PS of power. It was a direct implementation of the project, with minor changes and improvements. Like other vehicles from the brand, the car had a body made using the Plasteel system, weighing only 650 kg and measuring 3.19 meters, still being the smallest car ever produced in Brazil.

It was first sold in 1988 in a system where the buyer had to acquire shares from Gurgel in order to buy the car. The car cost about US$5,000, but the buyer had to buy 750 shares for another US$5,000 in order to get a car, making it considerably more expensive than a US$7,000 Chevrolet Chevette, the then cheapest car in the Brazilian market. This system lasted until 1990, when the car was sold independently of the shares. In this same year, the federal government changed the rules to give the same reduction of the IPI to all cars below 1000 cc, thus enabling Gurgel's competitors to develop one-litre models of existing cars.

In 1992, in a response to the market, the Supermini model was created: it had a better finish, more power (36 PS), a lot of improvement in the body, including a more robust suspension, a better system for the windows and a real lid for the trunk.

=== Last projects and bankruptcy (1993–1994) ===
When president Fernando Collor went to office in March, 1990, he soon opened the Brazilian market to foreign products. Even considering the high import taxes, national industry from the time suffered from the new external competition, and things weren't different for Gurgel. The Carajás, which had been Brazil's best selling SUV, was taken out of production in early 1991 as the Lada Niva arrived in the Brazilian market.

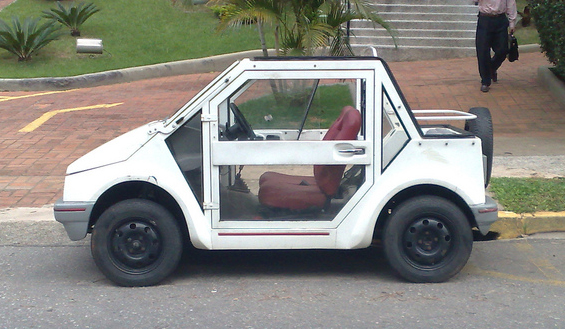
Gurgel Motomachine

The president also extended the IPI reduction of Gurgel BR-800 to all vehicles below 1,000 cc. Fiat quickly responded by launching the Uno Mille, and other automakers soon followed with their own one-litre cars. This step was considered by many Gurgelistas a kind of betrayal from the government, as the prices of these vehicles was now very similar. In 1991 Gurgel released the Motomachine, a shortened two-seater roadster based on the BR-800. Only 177 of these were built in 1991.

However, Gurgel had gained a lot of experience and feedback from the customers and investors during the BR-800 sales, and with that input in mind they started a new project called Gurgel Delta. This project was intended to be cheaper than the BR-800, aimed at the lower economic classes, being produced in a new plant near the target market: the northeast.

Governors of state of Ceará and São Paulo signed a letter of intent in December 1991, where they confirmed interest to fund Gurgel in US$30 million and US$50 million each. BNDES would also join if both states confirmed the funding, adding US$25 million. By that time, Gurgel had already bought the ground of 650000 square meters, needed for the new factory facilities, and negotiated with Citroën the purchase of machinery used for 2CV production.

However, the state of Ceará did not confirm the funding in succeeding years, leading to the loss of support from São Paulo and BNDES. The schedule for production of the new car was delayed, and in 1993 Gurgel entered a preventive bankruptcy. Gurgel still tried reaching an agreement with the federal government, presenting the Delta project to then-President Itamar Franco.

This presentation resulted in a technical note from the (now extinct) MICT (Ministério de Indústria, Comércio e Turismo, or "Ministry of Industry, Commerce and Tourism" in English) saying that "immediate actions needed to be taken", treating the matter as of "national interest". Still, no funding was produced, and on March 1, 1994, Gurgel had it first collapse. The administration appealed, but it was already too late, and at the end of 1994 the doors were finally closed and locked. Gurgel's corporate entity went bankrupt, leading João Gurgel to blame then-governor Ciro Gomes for the financial meltdown. Gomes asserted that Gurgel took a massive loan before the contract and failed to repay it, expecting the State to absorb the debt, which lead to the suspension of the deal between the company and the State of Ceara.

=== Current days (2000 and beyond) ===
The trademark Gurgel expired, was bought by another business, and is now used by a small Brazilian importer of tricycles. The current Gurgel has nothing in common with the original Gurgel company, except the name.

The vehicles produced by the original factory are still running on Brazilian roads nowadays. It is not uncommon to see X-12, Tocantins, Supermini or BR-800 models on the streets, despite the reduced number of specialized workshops and lack of specific parts for replacement.

Gurgel's founder and owner João do Amaral Gurgel was born in 1926. A few years after Gurgel's bankruptcy, João do Amaral Gurgel developed Alzheimer's disease. He died on January 30, 2009, in São Paulo, due to complications from the disease.

== Vehicles produced ==
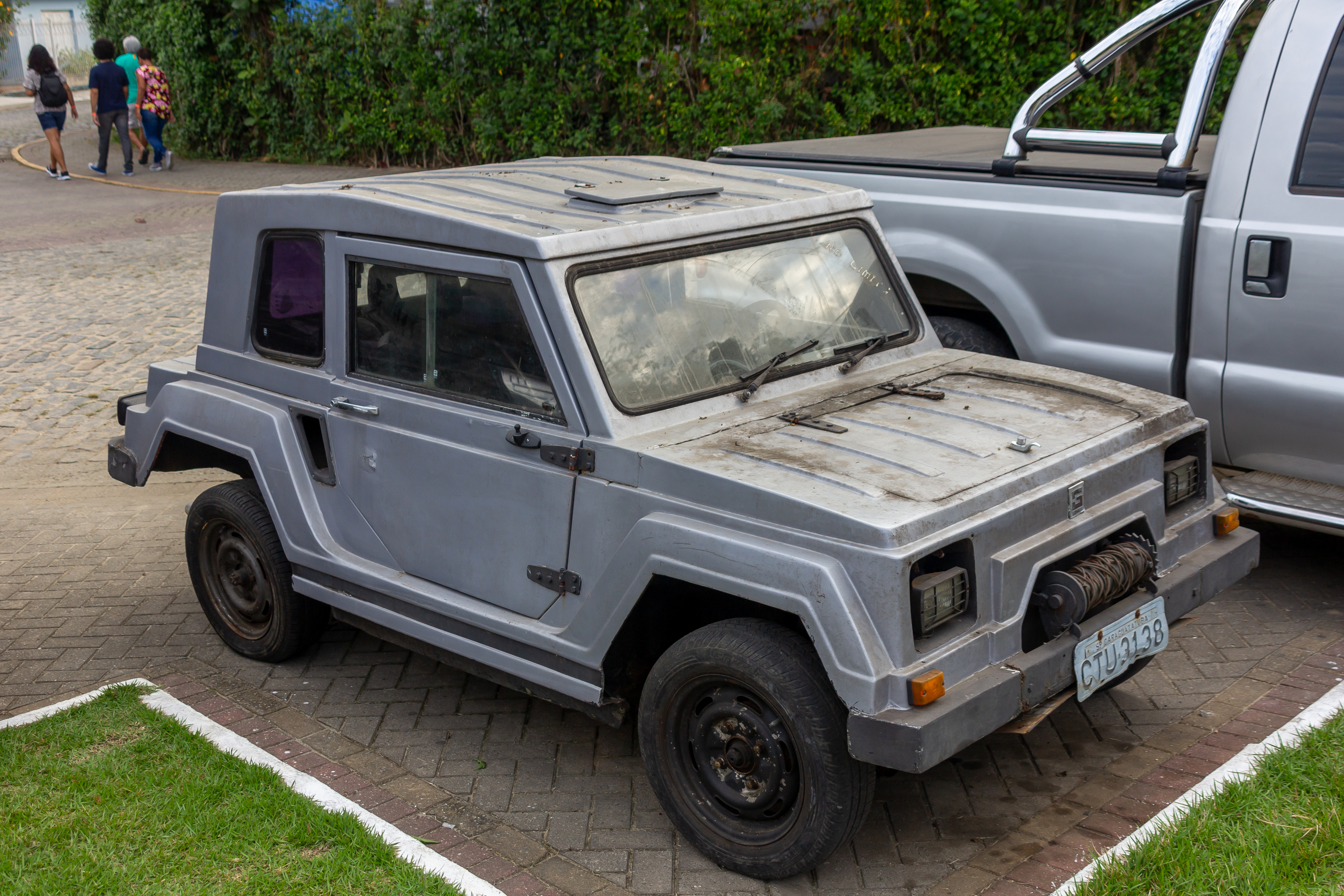
Gurgel X12

- Gurgel Moplast: A very small vehicle, with fiberglass body.
- Gurgel Ipanema: A dune buggy, bigger than Moplast, based on VW platform with fiberglass body.
- Gurgel Xavante X10: With a new chassis made of fiberglass over a steel framework and VW Beetle engine and transmission, this small off-road car showed its dune buggy roots but with a more Jeep-like styling and intended usage. Some thousands produced in 1970 decade. Early models had more rounded, dune buggy-like lines, while later ones are more square and Jeep-like.
- Gurgel Xavante X11: Similar to Xavante X10, but from late 1970 decade. Some thousands produced.
- Gurgel Xavante X12: Also similar to Xavante X10. Some thousands produced in the 1980s.
- Gurgel Itaipu: The first project for an electric car, still the only electric car ever produced in Brazilian history. First produced in 1973. Only a few of these tiny two-seater cars were produced and they were not sold since the car never developed past the prototype stage. The car was named after a huge hydro power plant on the border of Brazil and Paraguay.
- Gurgel Tocantins: An evolution of Xavante X12. Bigger motor, 4 X 2 and also with fiberglass chassis. It was a commercial success, exported to 40 countries.
- Gurgel Carajás: A large SUV powered by a 1.8 water-cooled engine from the Volkswagen Santana. The engine was mounted at the front, with rear transmission. The last Gurgel Carajás was produced in January 1991. After the Carajás, no more Gurgel SUVs were made. The rare Carajás VIP has four doors.
- Gurgel X15: A pick-up with a number of different body types, few units produced. The G15 has a longer wheelbase but is otherwise similar.
- Gurgel X20: Another pick-up, few units produced.
- Gurgel Itaipu E400/E500: An electric-powered pickup/delivery van, with few units produced.
- Gurgel G800: An internal combustion engine version of the E500, few units produced.
- Gurgel XEF: City car shaped like a saloon, powered by Volkswagen's air-cooled 1.6 engine from the original Beetle. Only one hundred Gurgel XEF were made. It had an unusual three-occupant configuration, with each occupant sitting side-by-side.
- Gurgel BR-800: City car built from 1988 to 1991. In order to buy one from the first lot, the customer had to acquire shares from the Gurgel brand, as a way to capitalize the factory. After 1990, the shares acquisition was no longer necessary. It sold reasonably well in 1989 and 1990, but sales dwindled in 1990 after IPI reduction of other cars in the segment.
- Gurgel Supermini: The BR-800 evolution, built from 1991 to 1994. More improved and with better finish that BR-800.
- Gurgel Motomachine: A smaller two-seat roadster version of the Supermini, only 177 were produced in 1991.
