= Tecnologia Automotiva Catarinense =

Tecnologia Automotiva Catarinense S/A
- Company type: Subsidiary
- Industry: Automotive
- Founded: 2004 in Joinville
- Founder: Adolfo Cesar dos Santos
- Headquarters: Sobral, Ceará, Brazil
- Area served: Brazil
- Key people: Antonio Ferreira Souza (CEO)
- Products: SUVs
- Website: www.tacmotors.com.br

The Tecnologia Automotiva Catarinense (TAC) is an automotive corporation established by Adolfo Cesar dos Santos in 2004 in Joinville, Brazil. In the financial support of BNDES, the plant was opened after four years of construction on 13 March 2008. In collaboration with the Portuguese company Datasul, TAC finally developed the SUV TAC Stark. Most vehicle parts for the vehicle are of the Marcopolo S.A. owned subsidiary MVC Soluções em Plástico Ltda.

Currently the company manufactures only the four-wheel drive TAC STARK. As of 2012, the vehicle is to be available for export and also be available in other countries. About 1200 units are produced per year.

In 2015, it was announced that Chinese automotive manufacturer Zotye Auto would buy TAC, however the deal did not go through. After three years off the market, the manufacturer returned to producing the Stark in 2018.

In 2021, a partnership was announced with a Brazilian holding company that intended to distribute Stark in Africa.
