= Troller Pantanal =

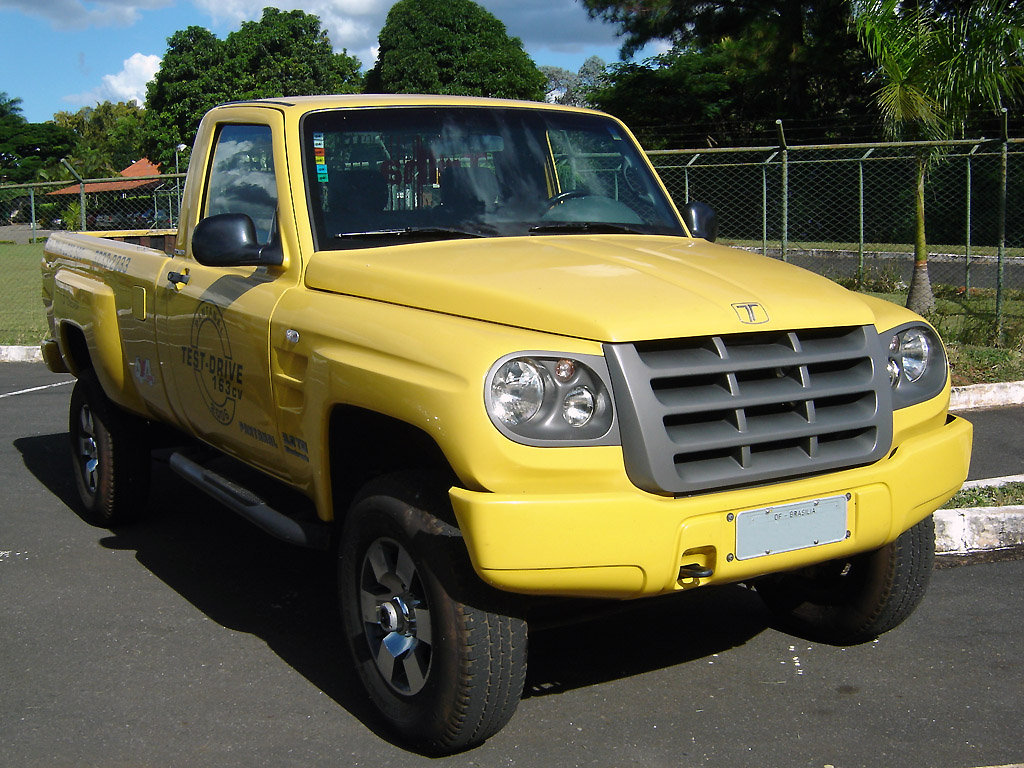

Overview
- Manufacturer: Troller
- Production: 2006-2008

Body and chassis
- Class: Mid-size pickup truck
- Body style: 2-door pickup
- Related: Troller T4

Powertrain
- Engine: 2.8 L MWM diesel 3.0 L NGD I4 turbo diesel
- Transmission: 5-speed manual

Dimensions
- Wheelbase: 131.9 in (3,350 mm)
- Length: 208.7 in (5,301 mm)
- Width: 77.2 in (1,961 mm)
- Height: 78.7 in (1,999 mm)

The Troller Pantanal is a mid-size pickup truck made by the Brazilian off-road vehicle manufacturer Troller Veículos Especiais S/A from 2006 to 2008. Only 77 Pantanal trucks were built, and all were recalled in February 2008 due to the possibility of cracks forming in the chassis. Ford, the current owner of Troller, announced that they would take back all 77 trucks, thus making the Pantanal obsolete unless an owner wished to keep their Pantanal.

== See also ==
- Troller T4
