= Gurgel BR-800 =

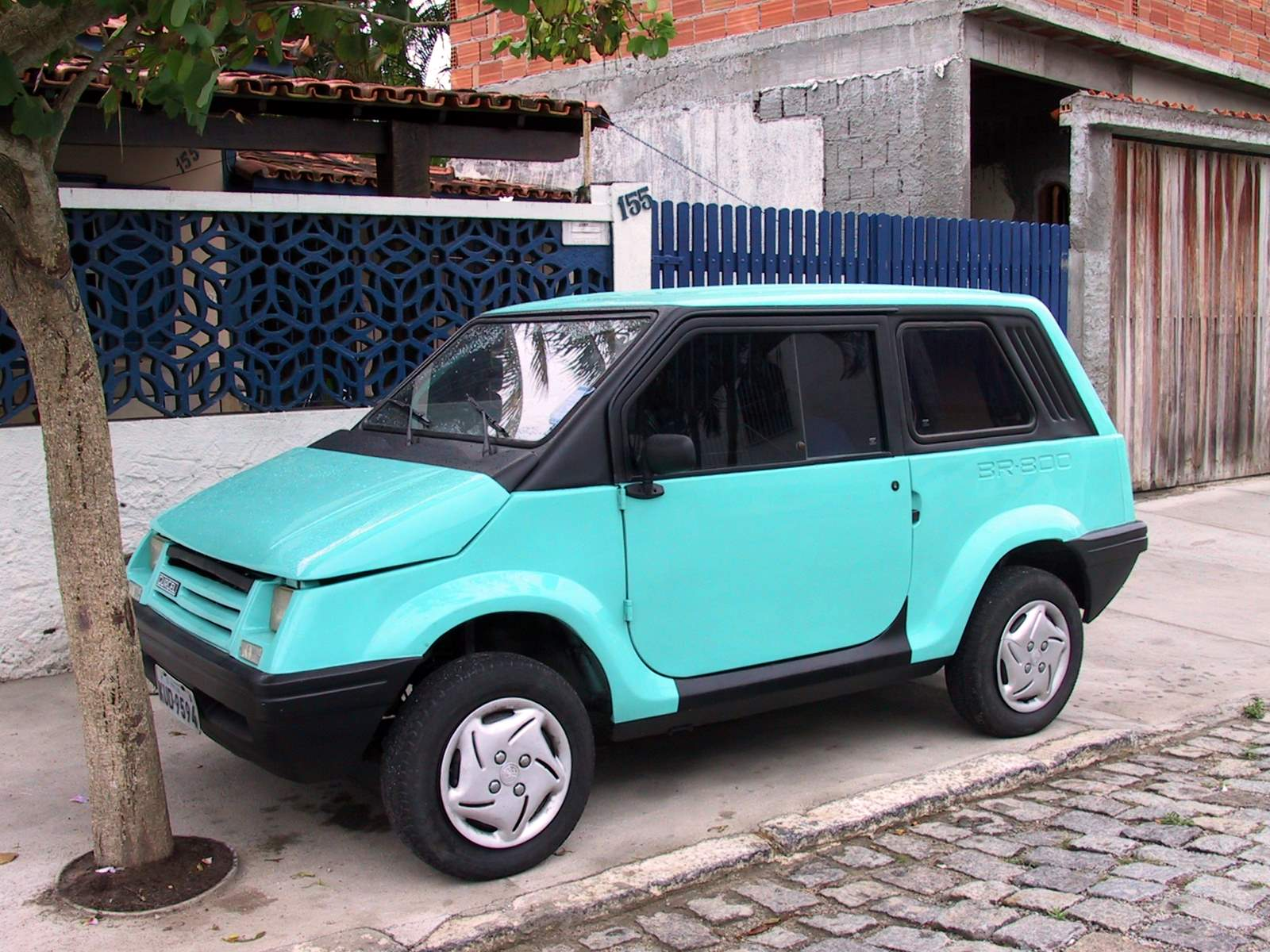

Overview
- Manufacturer: Gurgel
- Also called: Gurgel 280
- Production: 1988-1992
- Assembly: Rio Claro, São Paulo, Brazil
- Designer: João do Amaral Gurgel

Body and chassis
- Class: City car (A)
- Body style: 2–door Coupé
- Layout: front engine, rear-wheel drive
- Related: Gurgel Motomachine

Powertrain
- Engine: 792 cc Enertron H2
- Transmission: four-speed manual

Dimensions
- Wheelbase: 1,900 mm (75 in)
- Length: 3,195 mm (126 in)
- Width: 1,460 mm (57 in)
- Height: 1,460 mm (57 in)
- Curb weight: 650 kg (1,433 lb)

Chronology
- Successor: Gurgel Supermini

The Gurgel BR-800 is a Brazilian city car produced by Gurgel between 1988 and early 1992. The project started under the acronym CENA, meaning "National Economical Car" ("Carro Econômico NAcional", in Portuguese), designed to be essentially a small car for urban daily use. It received great attention and good reviews from critics, regarding the mechanic solutions, comfort, drivability and stability. When it was introduced in September 1987, the car was named the Gurgel 280 but by the time sales started it was changed to the BR-800. The car could only be purchased if the buyer also bought 750 shares in Gurgel, making it considerably more expensive than the much bigger and more capable Chevrolet Chevette, the then cheapest new car available in Brazil.

The project was favoured by Brazil's then-president, José Sarney, who ensured large unsecured loans for Gurgel's project and also allowed it to be sold at an especially low sales tax. Nonetheless, only about 40,000 were built in around four years of production.

== Mechanics ==
The engine, called the Gurgel Enertron, was developed by Gurgel themselves. This is a water-cooled flat-twin engine, essentially a halved Volkswagen flat-four engine. it was developed with either 650 cc (40 cu in) or 800 cc (49 cu in) displacements, generating 26 PS (26 hp; 19 kW) and 30 PS (30 hp; 22 kW) respectively. It had a very simple and robust design, eliminating totally the V-belt by using the crankshaft for activating the alternator, and the camshaft for water and oil pump. In a later stage of development, the V-belt was reintroduced for the alternator, so that the battery would be charged even at low engine speeds.

The car's ride also came in for heavy complaints, due to the use of Gurgel's own "Springshock" suspension. This system, made mainly from synthetic materials, was abandoned for a more conventional setup for the succeeding Supermini.

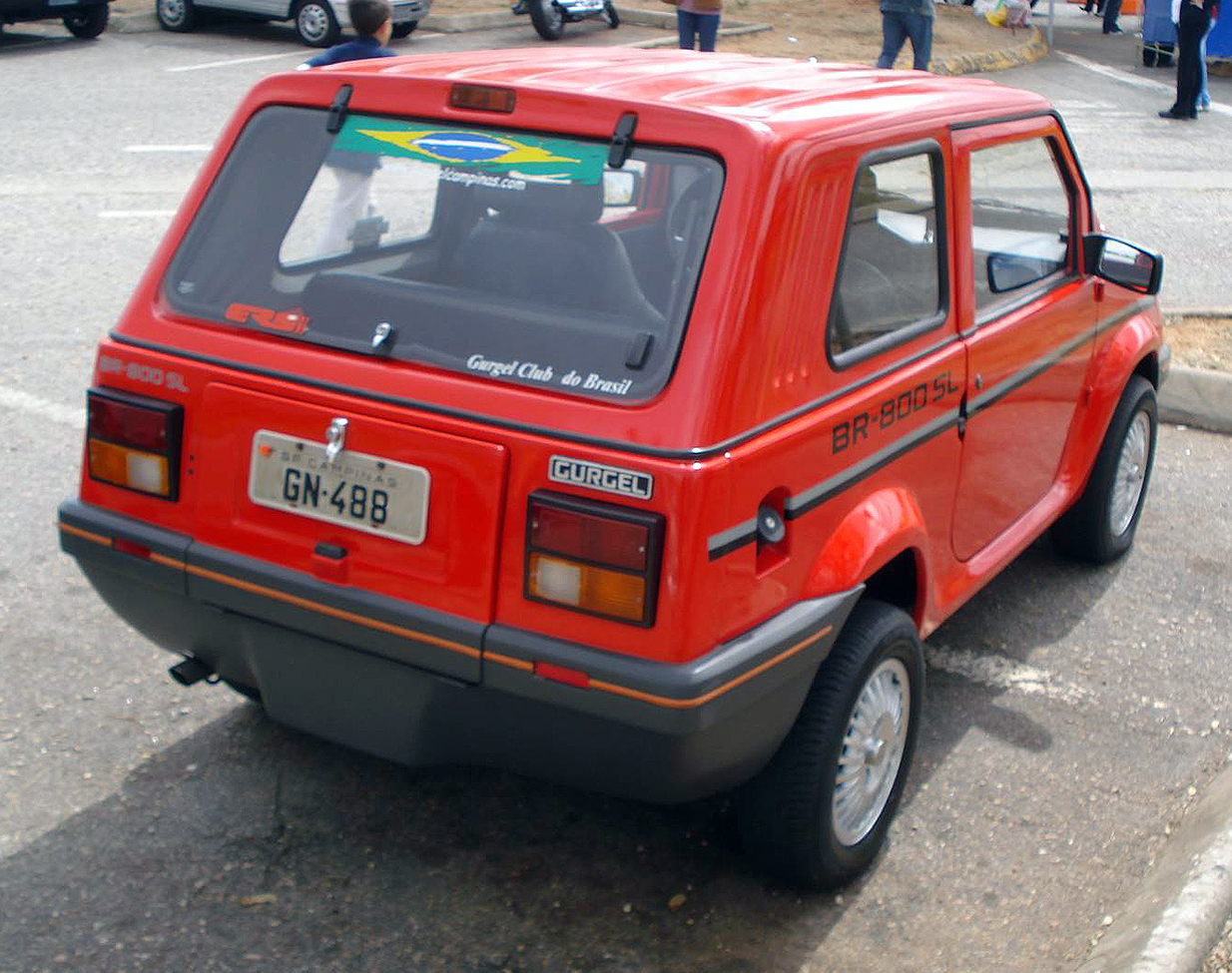
Rear view of Gurgel BR-800 SL

The body was made using Plasteel, designed for four passengers, and considered by some to have a good level of space for passengers and the driver, despite being less than 3.2 m (10 ft) in length. During development, the little 650 cc engine was set aside, and only a 32 PS version of the 800 cc engine entered production. Nonetheless, the car was considered underpowered, with a top speed of 110 km/h (68 mph). Power was increased to 36 PS (26 kW) for the later SL version. The body, in order to save costs, has flat windows.

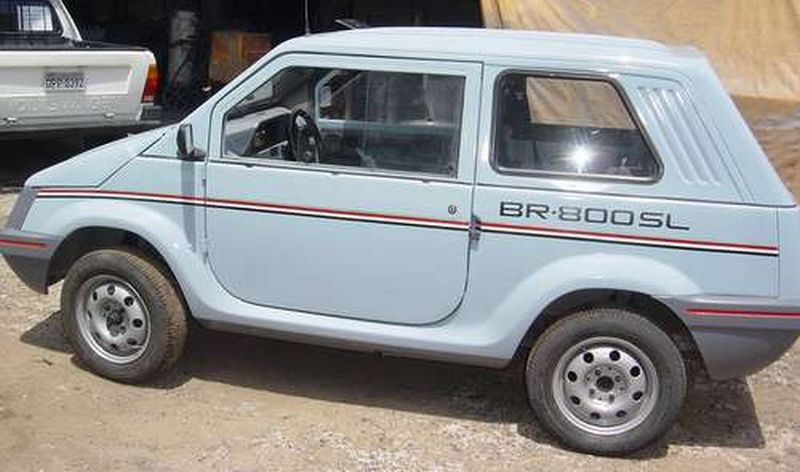
Gurgel BR-800 SL

Between 1988 and July 1990, Gurgel BR-800 had the IPI tax reduced to 7%, thus giving a great advantage for Gurgel. In July 1990, the Brazilian president Fernando Collor decided to give a similar tax cut to all cars with engines smaller than one litre, thus equating the price of the BR-800 with those of significantly larger and more usable cars, reducing the BR-800 sales to a trickle.

By the end of 1991, the BR-800 received some restyling and other improvements, it was now sold under the name BR-SL. This then received some general improvements and a more thorough restyling, evolving into the Gurgel Supermini.
