= TAC Stark =

TAC Stark 4WD Flex

Overview
- Manufacturer: Tecnologia Automotiva Catarinense
- Production: 2009 — present

Powertrain
- Engine: FPT 2.3L Turbo Diesel Intercooler Eletrônico Common Rail
- Transmission: Eaton gearbox FS2405 5 synchronized gears, four-wheel drive with reduced BorgWarner and differential lock with 44.3 Dana rear

Dimensions
- Wheelbase: 2,540 mm (8 ft 4 in)
- Length: 4,083 mm (13 ft 4.7 in)
- Width: 1,910 mm (6 ft 3 in)
- Curb weight: empty: 1650 kg/full: 2010 kg

The TAC Stark is a four-wheel drive vehicle manufactured by Tecnologia Automotiva Catarinense. This project came about through an initiative of Federação das Indústrias do Estado de Santa Catarina or FIESC (Federation of Industries of the State of Santa Catarina), on the grounds that Santa Catarina had many parts producers but no automakers.

== Powerplant ==
The Stark Flex is powered by the FTP 2.3L 16V Turbo Diesel Intercooler, one of the two standard van engines installed by Fiat and Iveco, supplied by FPT - FIAT Powertrain Technologies, the largest manufacturer of propulsion systems in Latin America. Developed and manufactured in Italy, the engine is also produced in TAG's Brazilian plant in Sete Lagoas (MG) from 2009.

== See also ==
- Troller
