= Grupo Caoa =

Brazilian automotive company

- Industry: Automotive
- Founded: 1979
- Founder: Carlos Alberto de Oliveira Andrade
- Headquarters: São Paulo, São Paulo, Brazil
- Area served: Brazil
- Key people: Carlos Alberto de Oliveira Andrade Filho (president)
- Subsidiaries: Caoa Chery; Caoa Hyundai
- Website: caoa.com.br

Grupo Caoa is a Brazilian automotive company that was established in 1979. It is the distributor of the Subaru, Hyundai and Chery brands in Brazil. It has two of its own factories in Brazil, one in the Agroindustrial District of Anápolis, where Hyundai and Chery models are assembled, as well as another in Jacareí, resulting from the acquisition of 50.7% of the company's Brazilian operations of Chery, in September 2017, forming Caoa Chery.

Caoa stands for the name of its founder, Carlos Alberto de Oliveira Andrade.

== History ==
Dr. Carlos Alberto de Oliveira Andrade of Paraíba purchased a Ford Landau in 1979, at a dealership called Vepel, in the city of Campina Grande in Paraíba, but the dealership went bankrupt before delivering the vehicle. As compensation for the undelivered car, Carlos kept the dealership. Six years later, Grupo Caoa – a name formed from the initials of its founder – reached the level of the largest Ford dealer in all of Latin America. The company's expansion in the automotive sector took place in 1992, when Brazil opened its doors to importing vehicles. In the following years, Caoa became an official importer of other brands such as Renault.

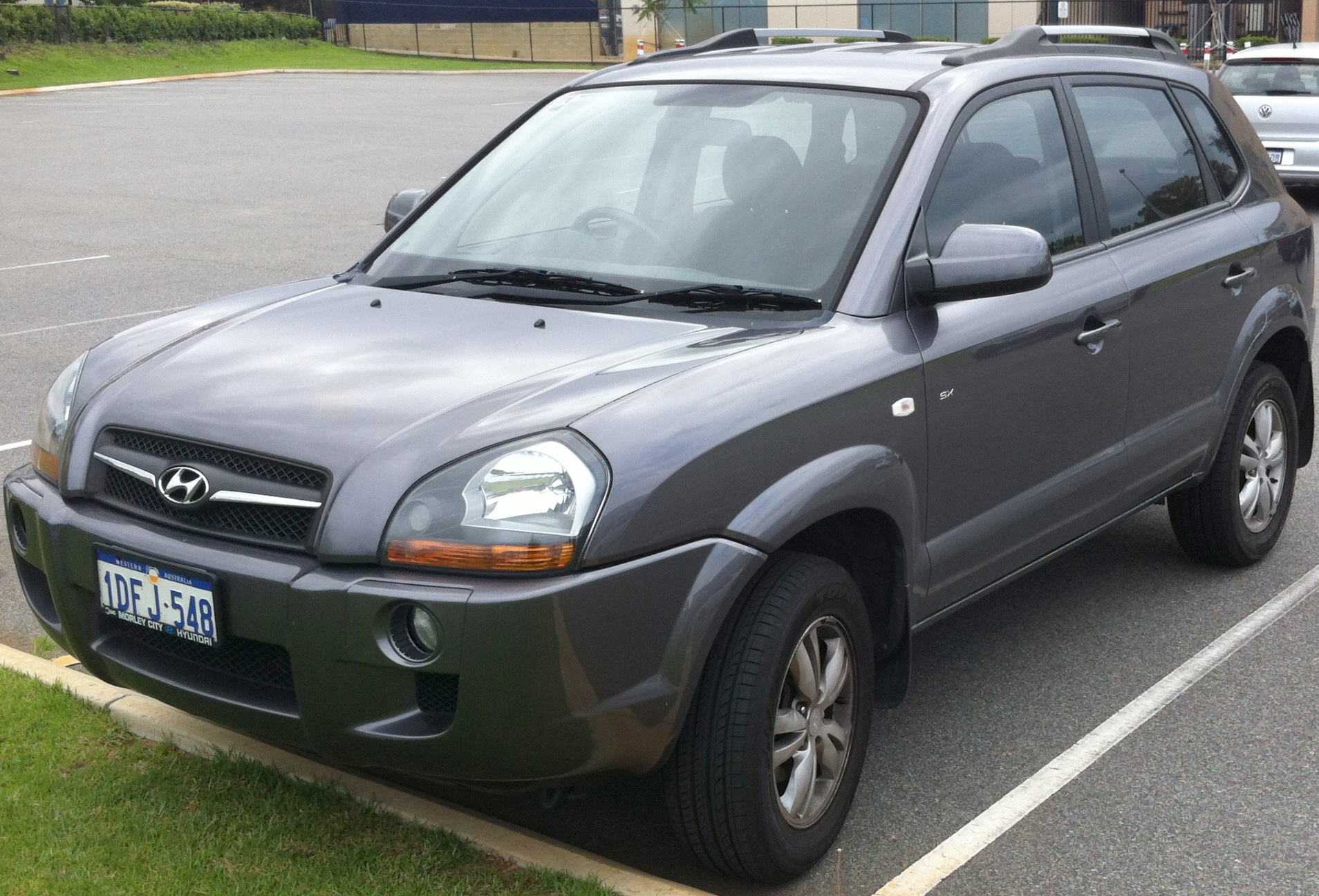
The Hyundai Tucson was the best-selling SUV in Brazil

In 1998, Caoa began representing Subaru, the automotive division of Subaru Corporation. In 1999, Hyundai also transferred its representation to Caoa in Brazil, after passing through the hands of two other distributors. In 2001, Hyundai became the leading brand in the import market and the Tucson became the best-selling SUV. In 2007, Grupo Caoa opened Caoa Montadora de Veículos, which was the result of an initial investment of R$1.2 billion, built in the Agroindustrial District of Anápolis. This resulted in earning Carlos Alberto de Oliveira Andrade the title of "Entrepreneur of the Year in Industry" by Istoé magazine.

In 2010, the Anápolis factory was recognized as a "Company for Good" by IstoÉ Dinheiro magazine, for its program of reusing waste from vehicle production and participation in reforestation in the Central-West region. In the last quarter of 2013, the Anápolis factory, which already produced the Tucson, the HR and the HD78, underwent a new investment cycle to begin production of the ix35. The investment of R$ 600 million guaranteed improvements in the assembly line with the inclusion of 10 robots, responsible for around 50% of the welding work. In May 2014, the 10,000th ix35 left the Caoa assembly line, and Grupo Caoa celebrated its 35th year. In 2017, Hyundai Caoa ranked first in the vehicle after-sales satisfaction survey, according to J.D. Power, which interviewed more than 3,700 owners who purchased new cars in the last 12 months in the country. In November of the same year, Caoa acquired 50.7% of the Brazilian operations of Chinese manufacturer Chery, becoming responsible for manufacturing and distributing the brand in Brazil.

== Controversy ==
=== False advertising ===
In 2011, the group was reported to the Public Ministry of Minas Gerais (MPMG) for possibly carrying out misleading advertising, such as declaring the model year of the Subaru Forester, safety and engine of the Hyundai ix35 and the power of the Veloster, Elantra and other models.

=== Corruption allegations ===
In 2015, Grupo Caoa, together with other automakers, was investigated for lobbying allegations for the approval of Provisional Measure 471 of 2009, under the government of then President Luiz Inácio Lula da Silva, which granted tax benefits to automotive companies.

In 2016, Grupo Caoa was accused of paying bribes to the former Minister of the Civil House and Finance Antonio Palocci, in 2010, in exchange for his work in approving Provisional Measure 512 of that year, and to the governor of Minas Gerais, Fernando Pimentel, in exchange for tax benefits. In November 2017, the Federal Public Ministry expanded investigations into Caoa's relations with Palocci, after it was found that Palocci's consulting company Projeto signed several contracts with Grupo Caoa.
