= Chevrolet Trailblazer =

Automotive nameplate by General Motors

The Chevrolet Trailblazer is an automobile nameplate used by General Motors for its Chevrolet brand since 1999 for several SUV models:

- TrailBlazer, a name of appearance package for the Chevrolet S-10 Blazer used between 1999 and 2002
- Chevrolet Trailblazer, a mid-size SUV produced since 2001 as the successor to the S-10 Blazer
- Chevrolet Trailblazer, a subcompact crossover produced since 2020
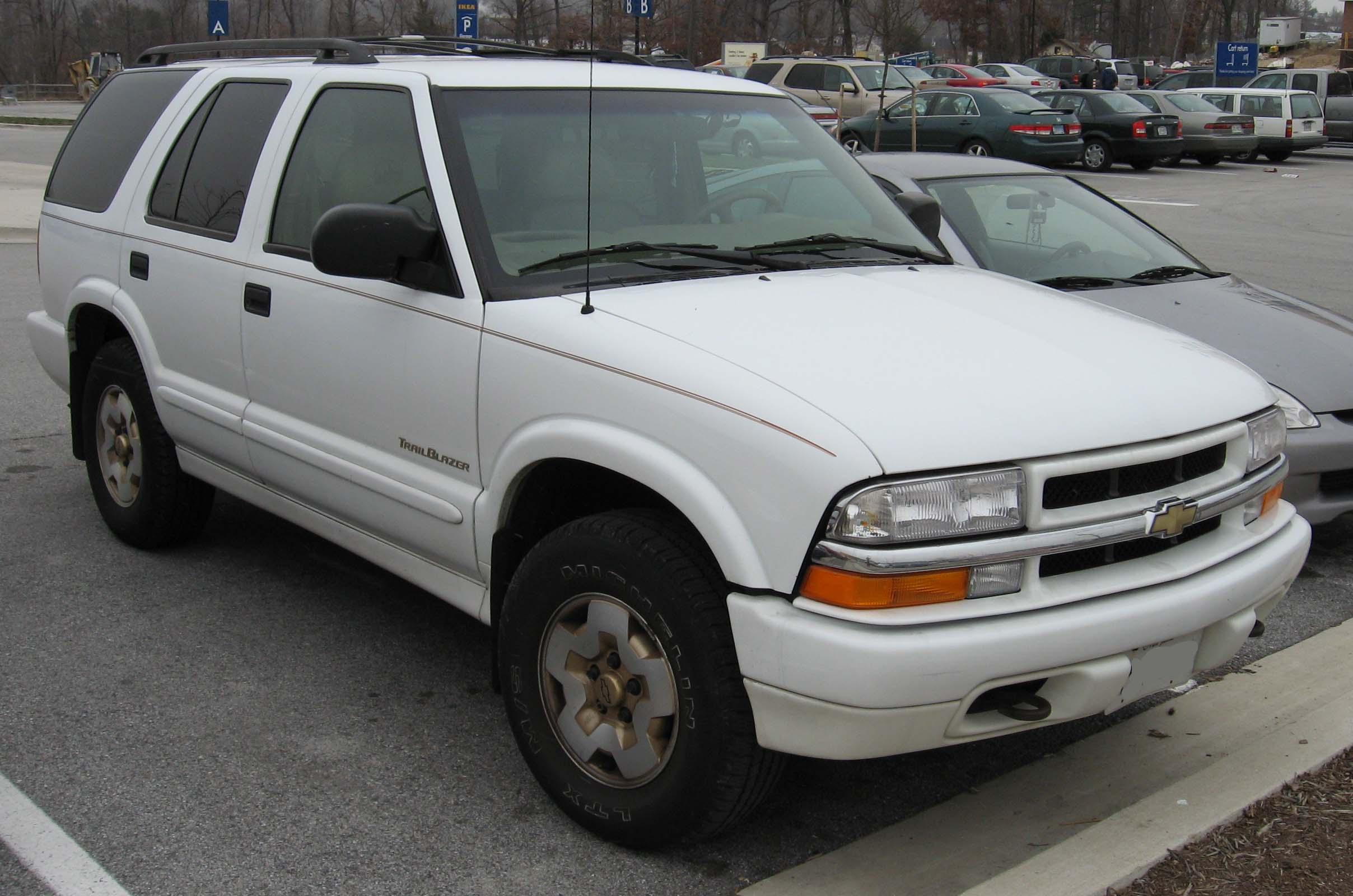
1999–2002 Chevrolet S-10 Blazer with TrailBlazer appearance package

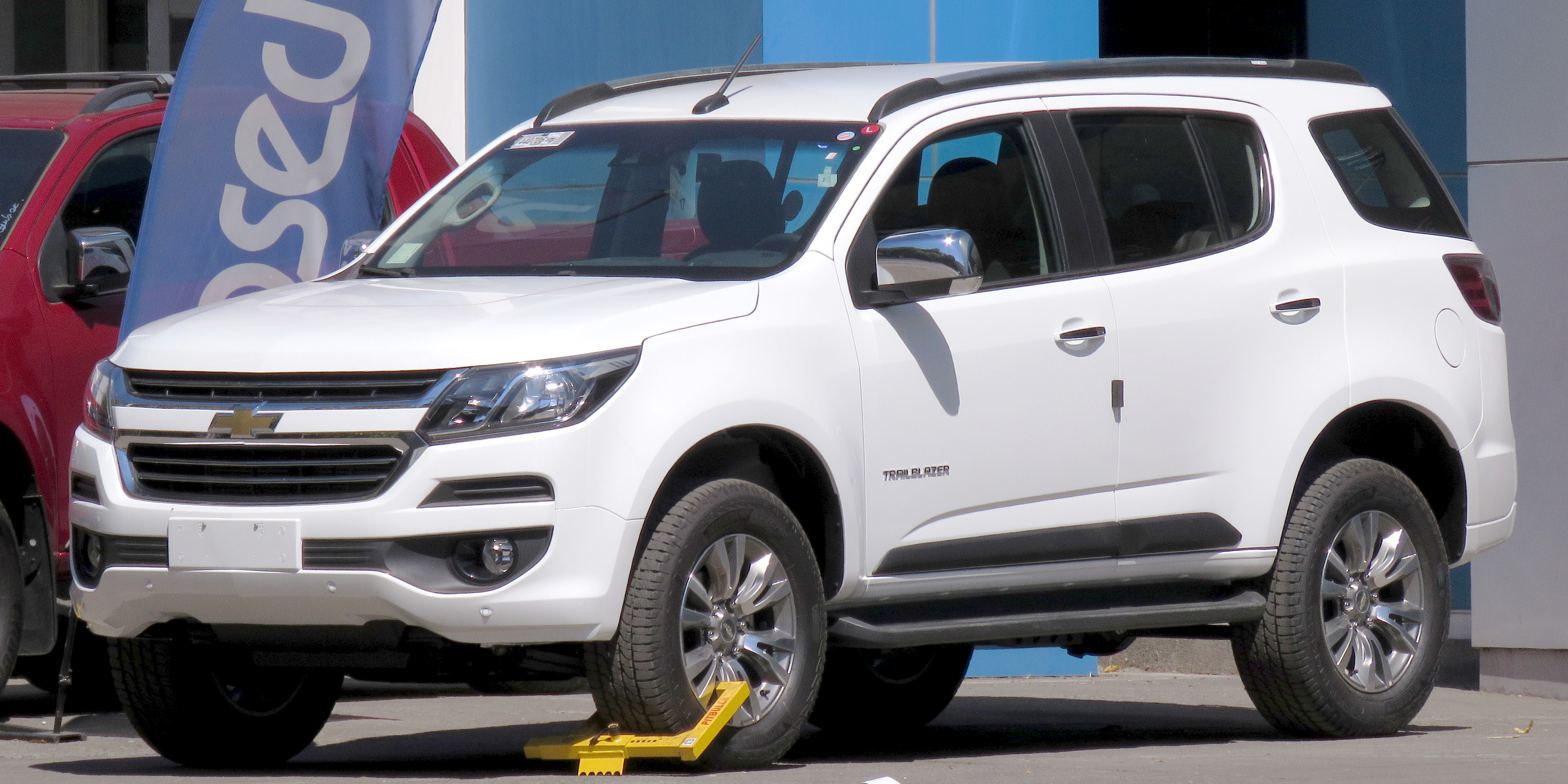
2019 Chevrolet Trailblazer (SUV)

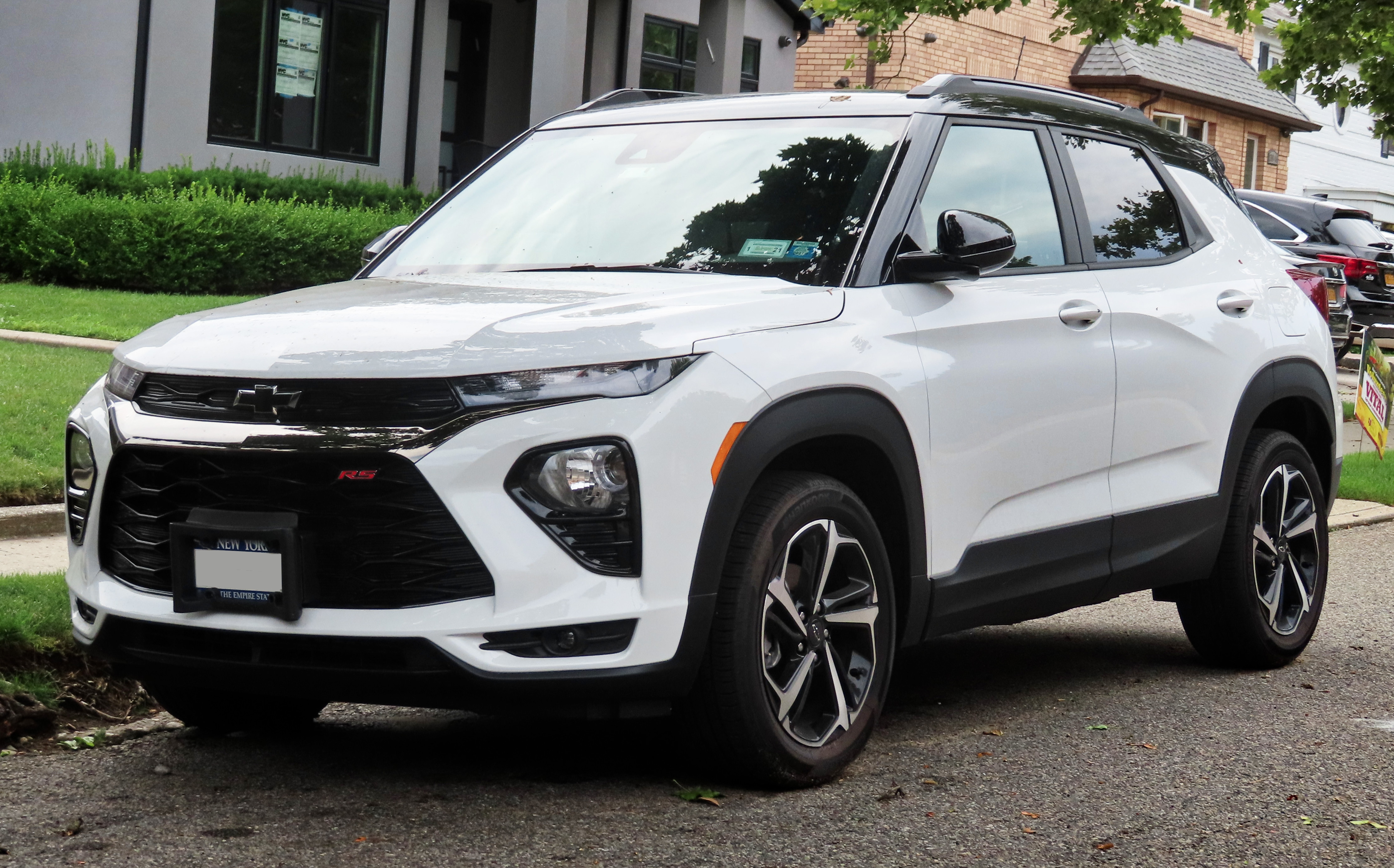
2021 Chevrolet Trailblazer (crossover)

== See also ==
- Chevrolet Blazer
