= Chevrolet Blazer =

Automotive nameplate by General Motors

The Chevrolet Blazer is an automobile nameplate used by General Motors for its Chevrolet brand since 1969 for several SUV models:

- Full-size Chevrolet K5 Blazer, based on the C/K pickup chassis and built from 1969 to 1995 (renamed Blazer in 1992 and renamed Tahoe in 1995 for the 2-door and 4-door model)
- Compact and mid-size Chevrolet S-10 Blazer, based on the S-10 pickup and built from 1983 to 2012
- Chevrolet Grand Blazer, sold in Argentina, Brazil and Ecuador from 1990 to 2000
- Chevrolet Grand Blazer, full-size sold in Venezuela under the "Grand Blazer" name from 1993 to 1999 (GMT400 platform)
- Chevrolet Grand Blazer Z71, sold in Venezuela from 2000 to 2002 (GMT820 platform)
- Chevrolet Blazer (crossover), a mid-size crossover produced since 2019
- Chevrolet Blazer EV, a battery electric mid-size crossover produced since 2023
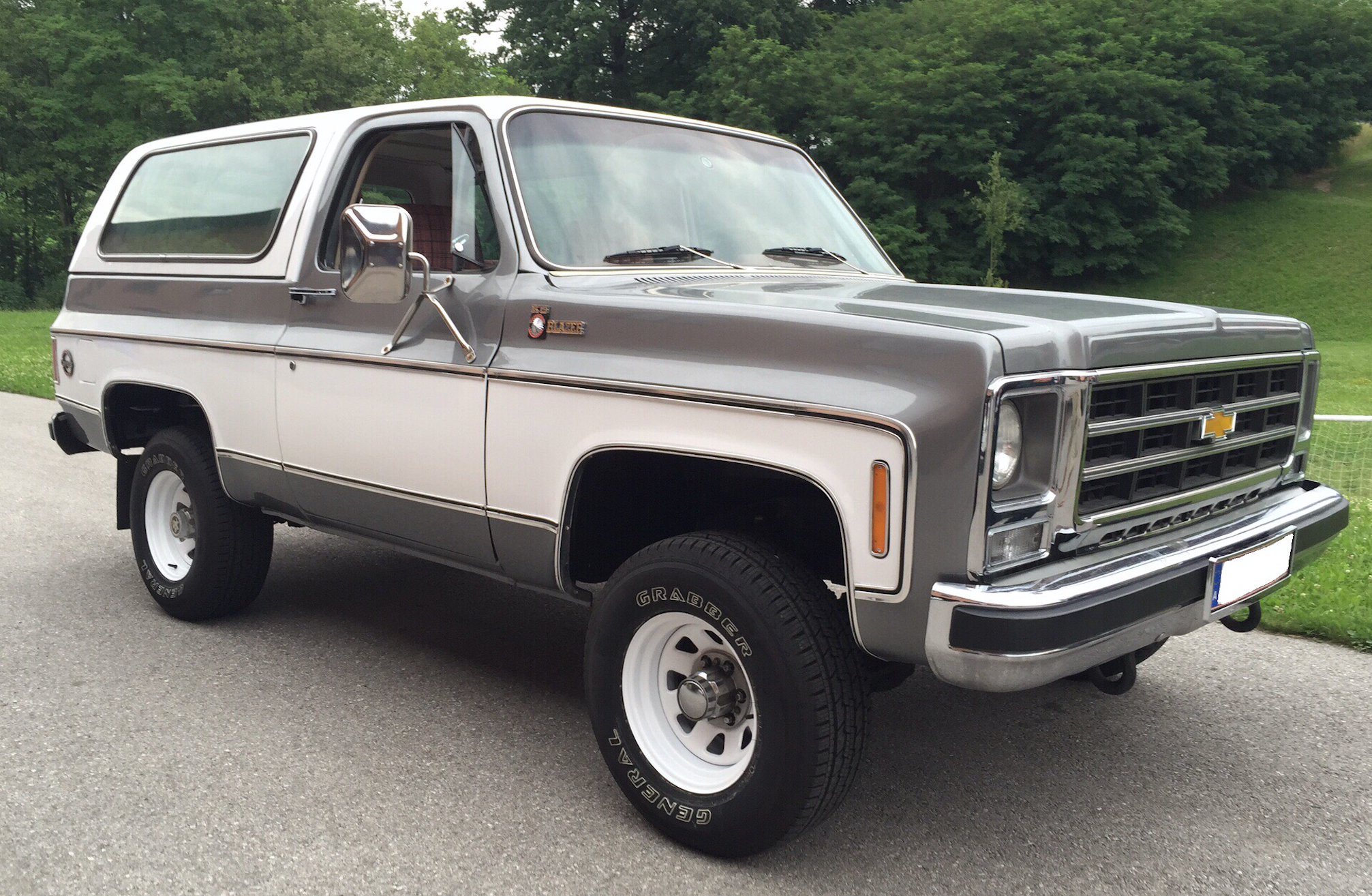
1979 Chevrolet K5 Blazer

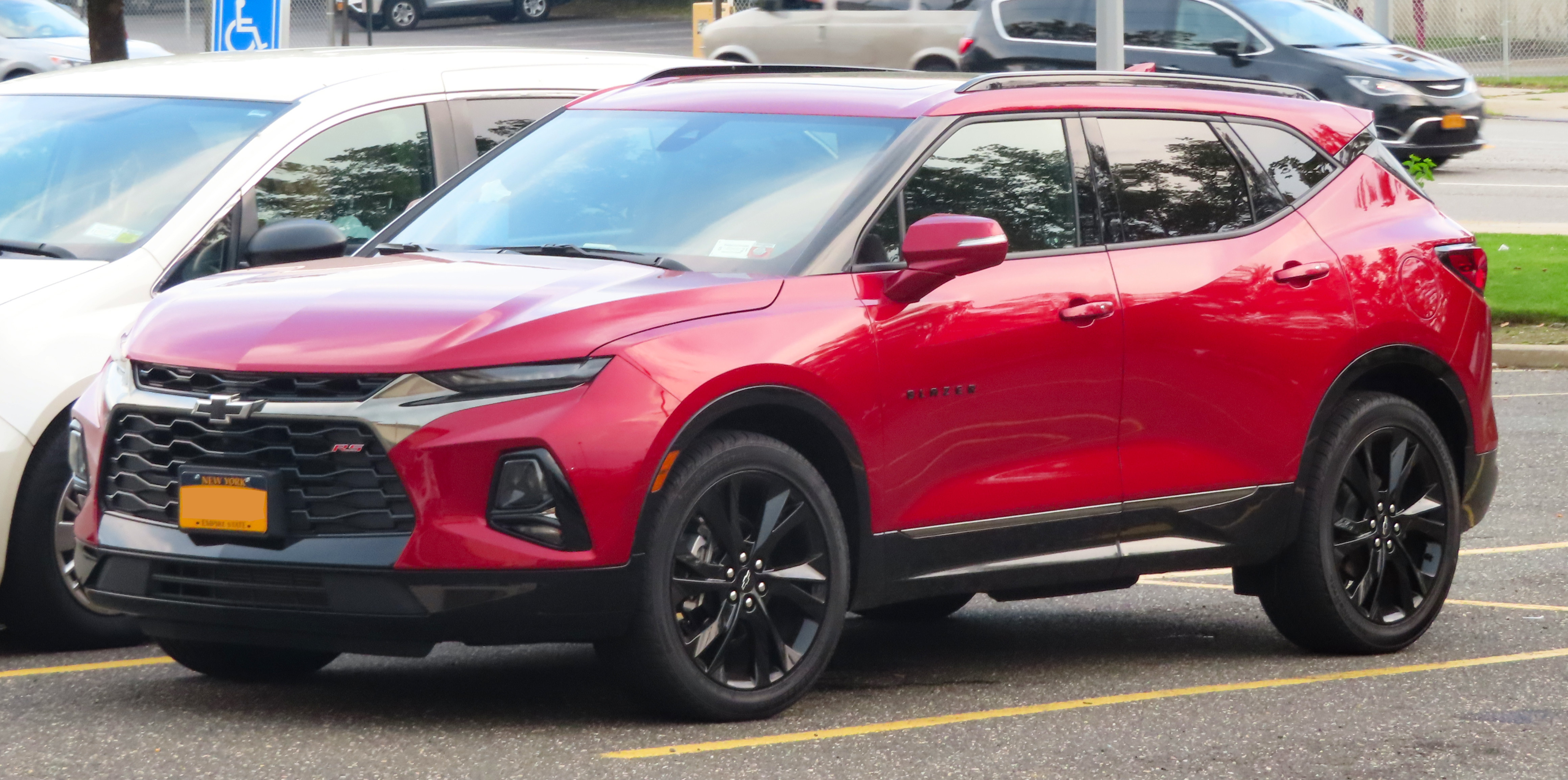
2019 Chevrolet Blazer

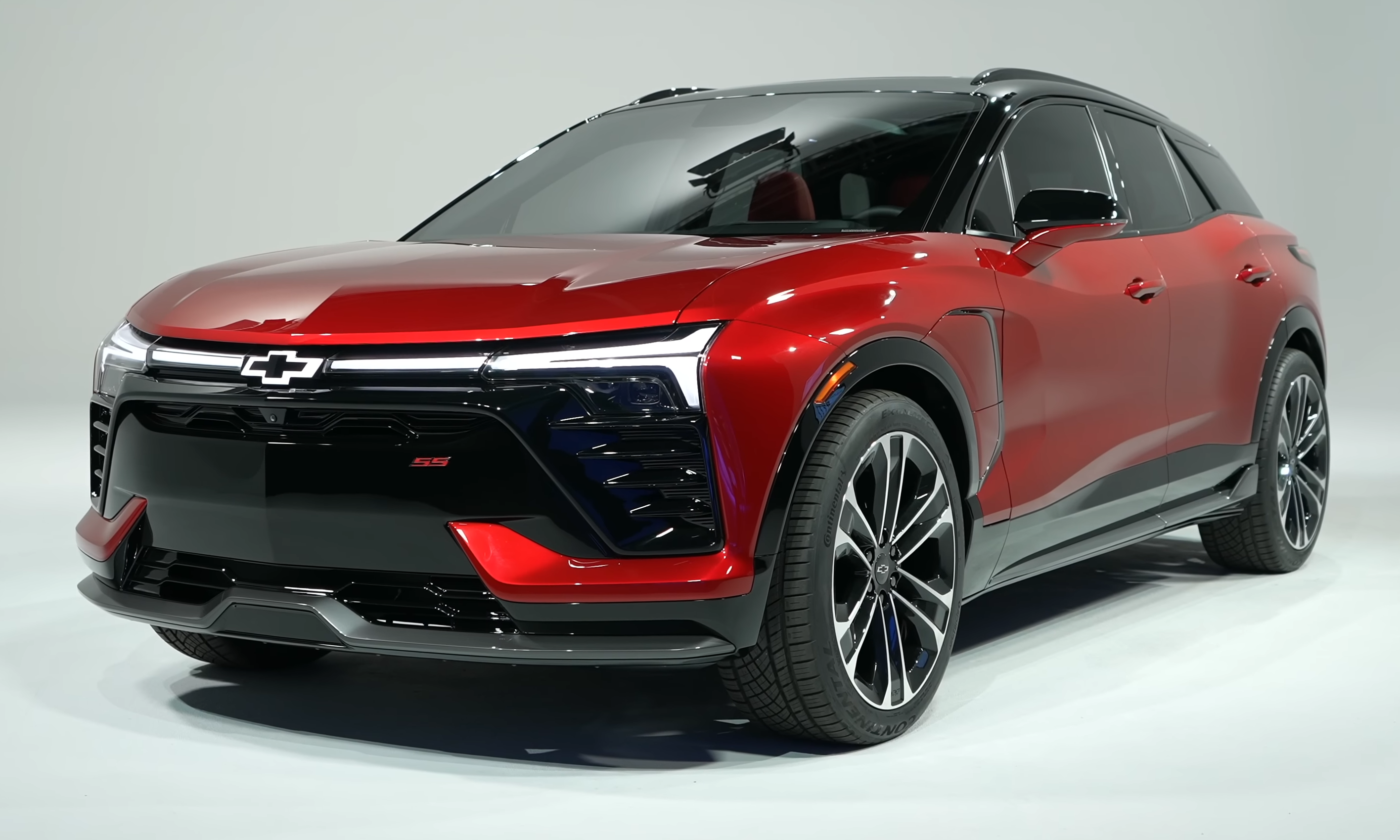
2024 Chevrolet Blazer EV

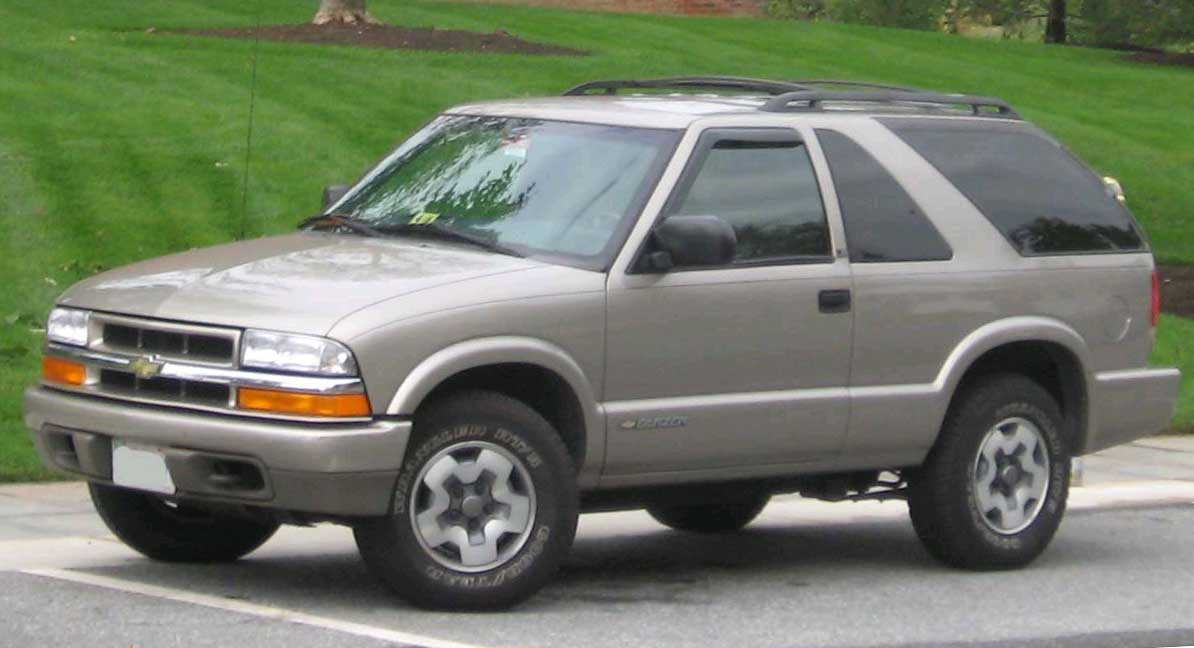
1999 S-10 Blazer

== See also ==
- Chevrolet Trailblazer
