= Troller T4 =

Brazilian vehicle

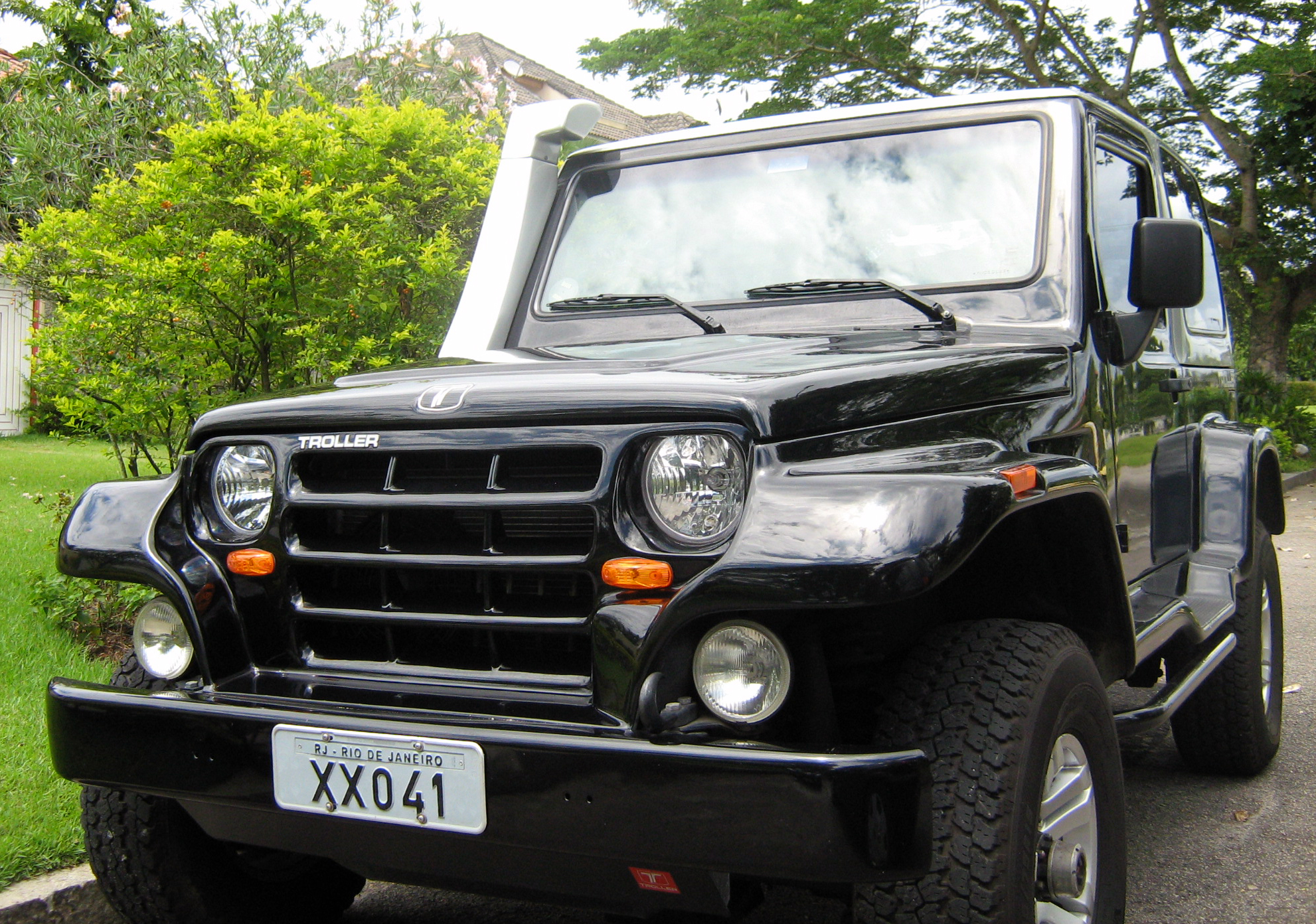
Troller T4 Hardtop (Second Generation)

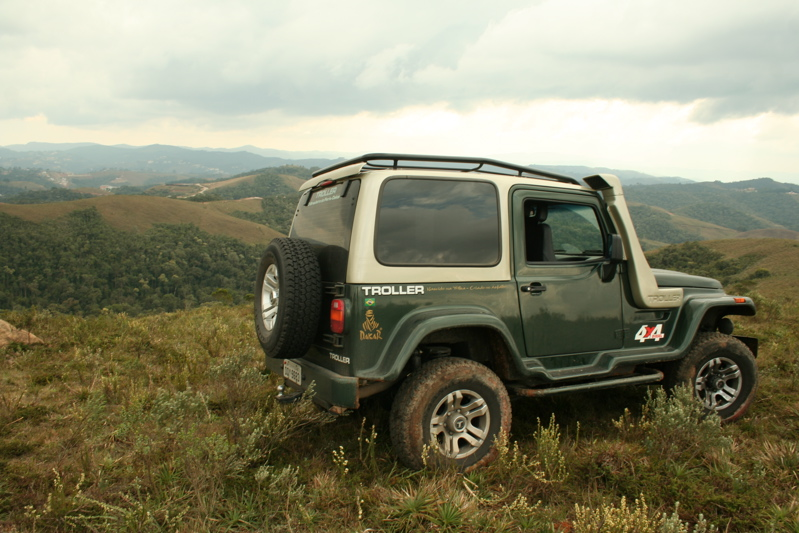
Troller T4 (Second Generation) in Campos do Jordão

The Troller T4 was a four-wheel drive Off-Road Vehicle that was made by Troller, a Ford-owned brand, founded in 1995 at Ceará State (Brazil) by Mr. Rogério Farias. It was only available as a two-door car with a fiberglass body and steel chassis, with a design initially inspired by the Jeep.

First Generation (RF-Sport) 1996-2001

In its first generation, launched in 1996, the brand was called "Troler"- with 1 L, and the model was called RF Sport (RF meaning Rogério Farias), a 4x4 vehicle with tubular chassis attached to body on fiberglass compound, in a similar process that makes dune buggys. The engine initially was Volkswagen "AP1800" - EA827 (gasoline), with carburetor and about 99cv of power. The transmission was carry over from Ford F-1000 (Clark 2615), with 5-speed manual. The axles were carry-over from Jeep Cherokee (Dana). In 1998, it received the "AP2000" engine, a Volkswagen EA827 variant with 2.0L and 115cv.

The Second Generation (T4) 2001-2014

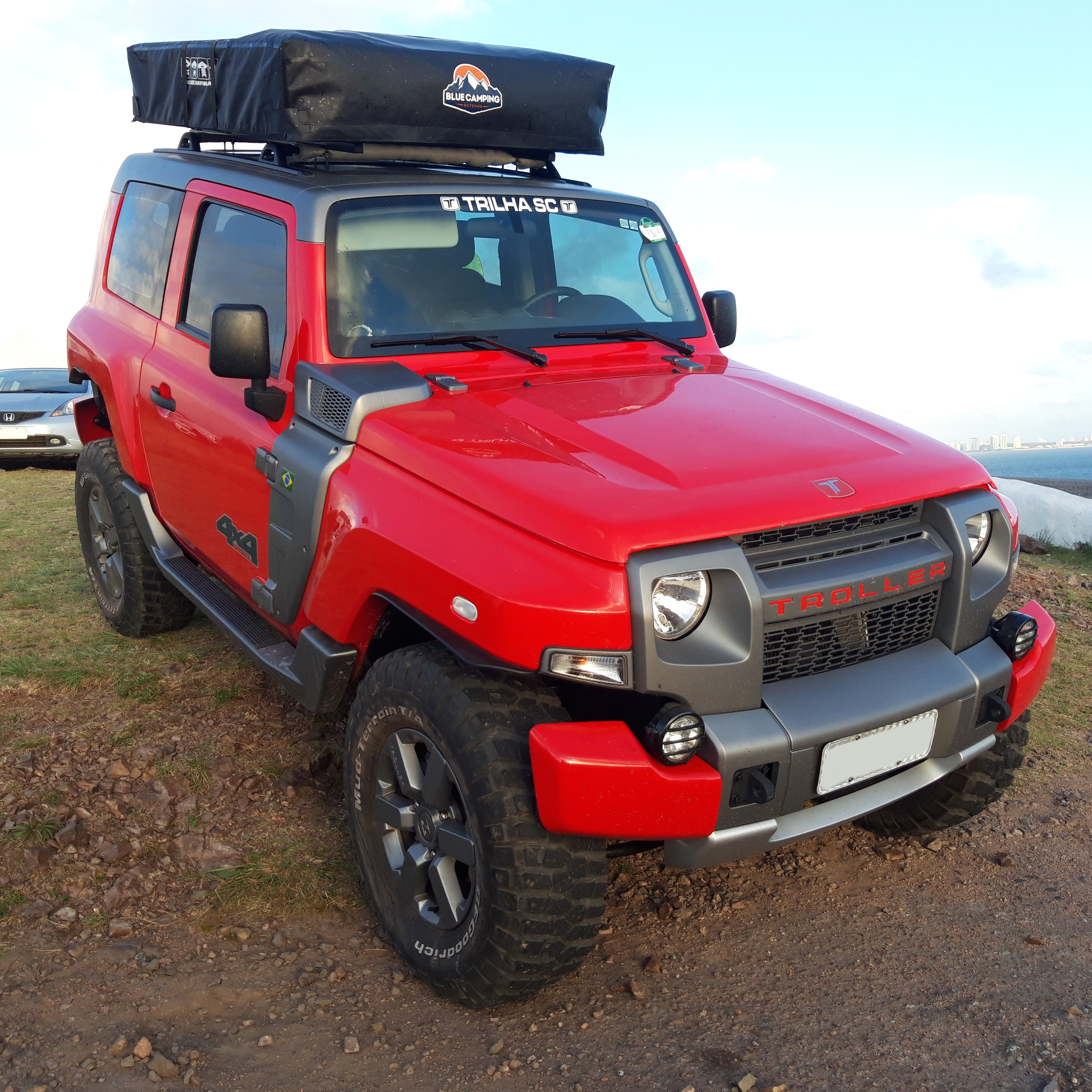
Troller T4 (Third Generation) Troller T4 (Third Generation) Troller TR-X Concept

The second generation was launched in 2001, featuring a redesigned chassis (with rectangular profile), and a classic body-on-frame arrangement, making it easier to manufacture and to increase production scale. With this generation, it was introduced the first Diesel option, 2.8L (4.07 TCA) built by MWM, delivering 115cv and 33 kgfm of torque. In the end of this year, the gasoline option was discontinued. The rigid-axles were changed for unique Troller, supplied by Dana axles, model 44, the Transfer case was Borg Warner 1352, full electronic, the bolt pattern was changed to 6 bolts per wheel and the transmission was changed to Eaton 2405, a 5-speed Manual. It was also included manual wheel hub at front wheels. The mechanical and interior parts were basically bought from Brazilian market vehicles, from several brands (mainly Volkswagen).

In 2006, the engine was changed to MWM / International Powerstroke NGD 3.0L, delivering 163cv and 38 kgfm of torque, the same offered by Ford Ranger, but the design remained the same.

In 2007, Ford Motor Company purchased the company for R$400 million (2007) (US$205.44 million);

In 2009, Troller T4 received its major change, since Troller's acquisition by Ford. All the interior was redesigned, now using only Ford-branded parts, like Fiesta's cluster, steering wheel and A/C vents, Ka's A/C controls, in a way to communize to other Ford products, improve quality and decrease costs. In exterior, the front grille was changed design, turning into removable. The underbody remained the same, and the 3.0L was still the only engine option.

In 2013, to comply with Brazilian emissions standards, the engine was changed to MWM/International Maxxforce 4-cyl, 3.2L TGV, with 165cv and 38kgfm, with more torque available at lower rpm's. This engine was used until 2014, when the vehicle was completely redesigned.

The Third Generation (T4) 2014-2021

In 2014, the T4 received a completely new generation, inspired by TR-X Concept, on a redesigned frame, based on Ford's T6 platform for the global Ranger, with a new Top Hat, now made using SMC (Sheet Molding Compound) Fiberglass. The version looked more like the modern form of the Jeep Wrangler and early Bronco models, including features like full LED backlights. The model extended the usage of Ranger carryover content. The engine offered was the Ford i5 3.2L Duratorq engine, producing 200cv and 47kgfm of torque and fitted at Getrag MT-82 6-Speed Manual transmission. The 6-Speed Automatic option (6R80) was available latter, in 2021 Model Year. The interior was completely redesigned and improved, now using mainly Ranger parts, including the dual-zone A/C controls, gear knob, traction switch, etc. The front axle was modified to eliminate the free-wheel hub and the rear axle was changed to Rangers', also supplied by Dana, with only Limited Slip Differential (LSD) option until 2021, when it was also offered with Electronic Locking Differential (ELD) at TX4 version.

In January 2021, Ford Brazil ceased its operations; On October, Troller's assembly plant was deactivated. Ford tried to sell the company, initially, but after an extended negotiation with the Ceará government, Ford Motor Company, its branch headquarters, decided to not sell the division.

== Description ==
It was a two-door vehicle and had two versions: fiberglass hardtop or canvas, both are removable (until 2024). It was powered by the following engines:

- Volkswagen EA-827 1.8/2.0: 99 hp / 115hp.
- MWM 2.8 Turbo Diesel (2001–2005): 132 hp gross (115 net hp), maximum speed of 160 km/h (99 mph).
- NGD 3.0 Turbo Diesel Electronic (2005–2012): 163 hp, top speed of 180 km/h (110 mph).
- Maxxforce i4 3.2 Turbo Diesel (2013-2014): 165 hp, top speed of 180 km/h (110 mph)
- Duratorq i5 3.2 Turbo Diesel (2014–2021): 200 hp and 470 Nm, top speed of 180 km/h (110 mph).

It was the best selling SUV in Brazil for mid-December 2008, when it had 1,104 units sold. In April 2010, Troller announced that the cumulative sales of T4 reached 10,000 units.

== See also ==
- Jeep Wrangler
- Ford Bronco (sixth generation)
- Troller Pantanal
