= Troller Veículos Especiais =

Brazilian off-road vehicles manufacturer

Troller Veículos Especiais S/A
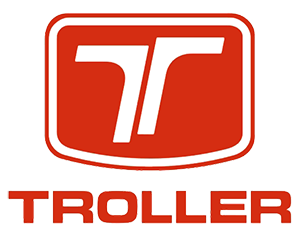
- Company type: Subsidiary
- Industry: Automotive
- Founded: 1995; 31 years ago
- Founder: Rogério Farias
- Defunct: 2021; 5 years ago
- Headquarters: Horizonte, Ceará, Brazil
- Area served: Latin America and Caribbean
- Key people: Rogério Farias, Mário Araújo Alencar Araripe; Demetrio Fleck (General Manager); Lyle Watters (president and CEO)
- Products: Troller T4
- Number of employees: 470 (January, 2021)
- Parent: Ford Brasil (2007–2021)
- Website: troller.com.br

Troller Veículos Especiais S/A (Troller) was a Brazilian off-road vehicle manufacturer. Founded in 1995 in Horizonte, Ceará, it became a subsidiary of Ford in 2007. The Troller T4 was a flagship vehicle, which had featured successfully in several rally races around the world, including the Dakar Rally.

== Etymology ==
The name Troller is a Brazilian adaptation of the English word Troll, which refers to a character of the Scandinavian legends that dwells forests and caves of Norway.

== History ==
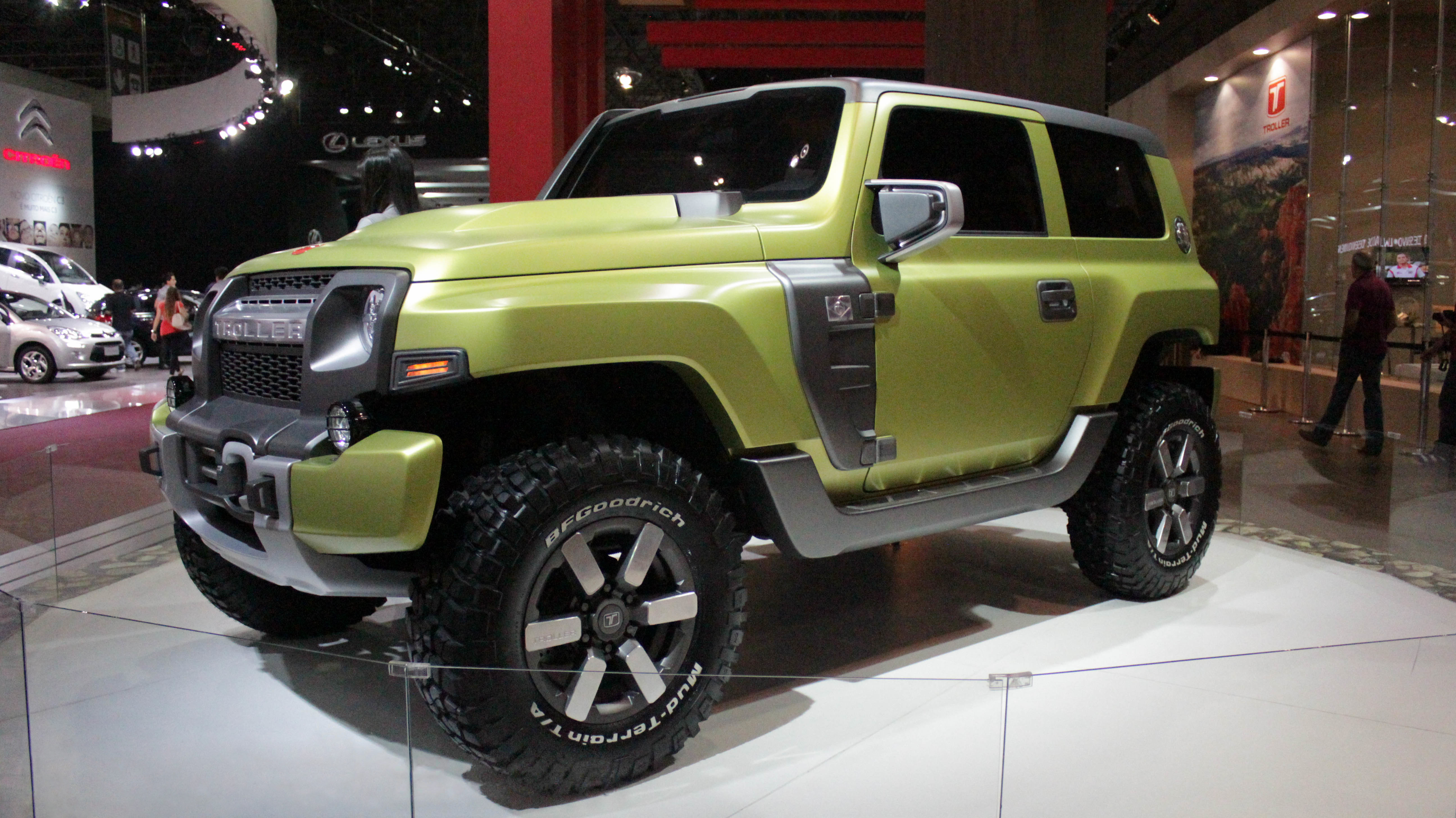
Troller Conceito TR-X exhibited in 2012

Troller started in 1995, by Rogério Farias. In April 1996, the first prototype was built.

In 1997, the company was bought by the entrepreneur Mário Araripe, who formed a partnership with Rogério Farias; the first gasoline-powered T4 was built. The mass-production of the vehicle started in 1999, when a factory was built in the municipality of Horizonte.

In 2005, a manufacturing plant opened in Angola to build the T4 for the African market. In January 2007, Ford do Brasil announced Troller's acquisition for R$400 million (2007) (US$205.44 million).

On 14 December 2009, a Troller made the news when it cleared São Paulo's flooded streets during a news broadcast, at the time, the company played along and tried to find the driver. The T4 received a redesign in 2014.

The Troller plant in Horizonte was closed by the end of 2021, with Ford ending all its production in Brazil. The brand and the Technology was not put for sale, just the industrial complex which comprises a land of 120,142 m^{2} (0.046387 sq mi) with 21,736 km^{2} (8,392 sq mi) of floor area. The special tax regime, valid until 2025, would also be linked to the factory.

The state owned company expropriated the 129,000 m² of land that was for sale and seems to re-assemble electric hybrid vehicles, six models from three brands, starting in 2025. The investment of R$ 400 million would be for the first phase 255 direct employees. The Plant where the assembly is planned in Horizonte was ceded by Adece to Comexport under a loan-for-use arrangement, where 3 years ago was ex Troller of ex Ford, meaning the forests behind with a total land of 550 000 m² is to be devasted near the water supply.

The Chevrolet Spark EUV is being assembled since 3 December 2025 in this plant.

== Models ==
- Troller Pantanal (2006–2008)
- Troller T4 3.2 Turbodiesel (2015–2021)

== See also ==
- TAC Stark - another Brazilian four-wheel drive vehicle.
