= Gurgel Carajás =

Brazilian Automobile

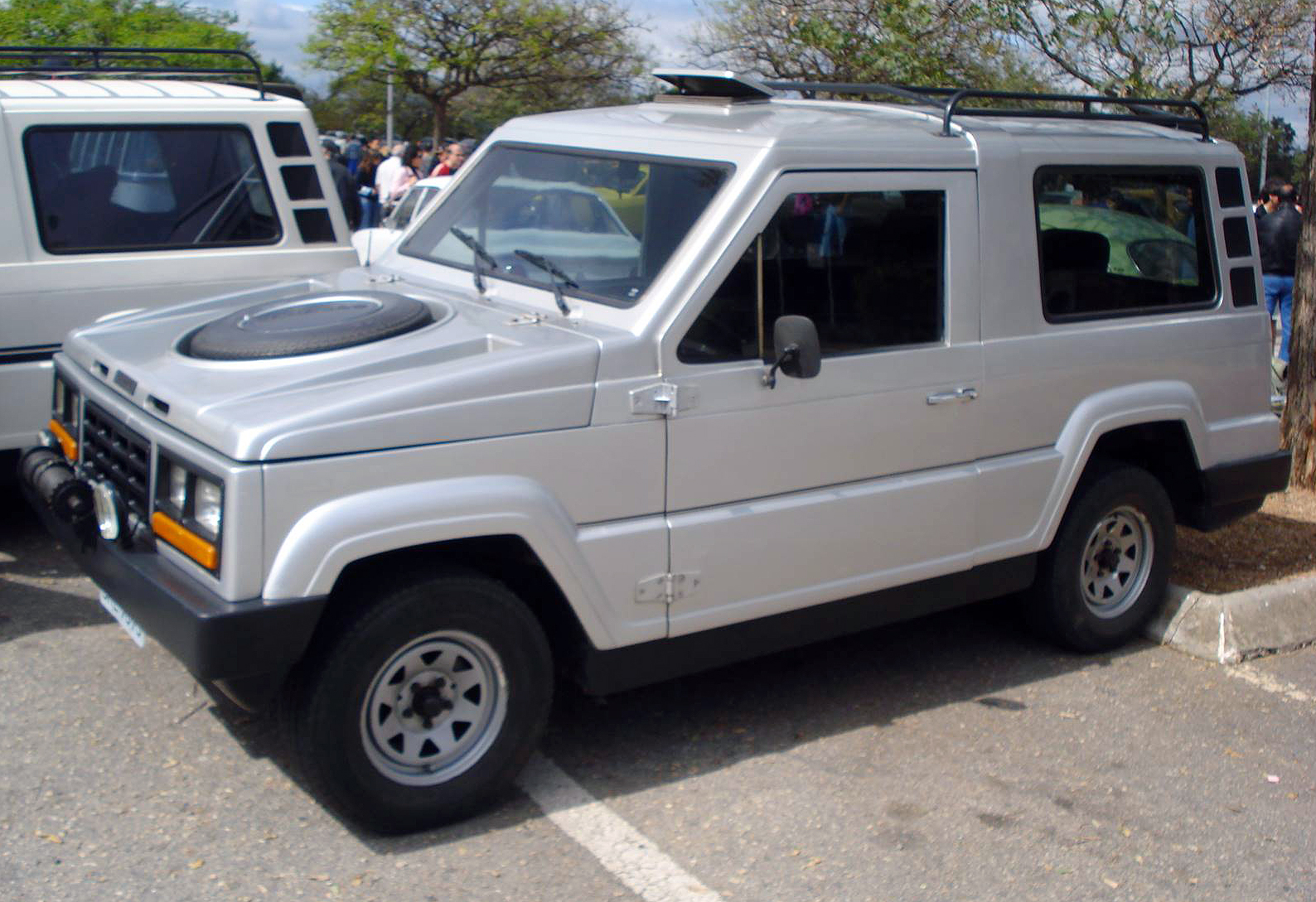
Fairly late Gurgel Carajás, with body-coloured front clip and roof

Gurgel Carajás was a Brazilian SUV produced by small manufacturer Gurgel between late 1984 and 1994. The name refers to a mountain range in western Brazil as well as to the native tribe living there. All Carajás were two-wheel drive and were produced with three engine options: gasoline and ethanol of 1800 cc displacement, and as a 1600 cc diesel. It has a front engine and a rear transmission, connecting both by the use of a transaxle system called Tork Tube System, or TTS for short. This layout added weight onto the driving rear wheels, boosting offroad abilities somewhat. Gurgel also installed "Selectraction", a system with two levers which allowed for brakes to be individually applied to either rear wheel, thus transmitting power to the other wheel.

The initial range was all two-door models, in either a base or luxo form. Four body variants were available: the TR (Teto Rígido, fixed roof) represented nearly all sales. The other three variants were TL (Teto de Lona, canvas top), RL (Rígido Lona, canvas with fixed roof and doors in front) and MM (Modelo Militar, for military use). The TL and RL models were soon removed from catalogues. In 1988 the equipment levels were renamed LE (basic) and VIP (more luxurious). In 1989 a four-door model sitting on a slightly longer wheelbase was presented; this version uses the same front doors as the ones fitted to the two-door models.

Between 1985 and 1990, it was the number one selling vehicle in its class in Brazil. In 1989, the Gurgel Carajás had a 75 percent market share in the category, while the only other locally made option - the very expensive Toyota Bandeirante - represented the remaining 25 percent. Between 1976 and 1990, new vehicle imports was not permitted in Brazil.

This success, however, ended in the second half of 1990, when the Lada Niva came to Brazil. Sales of the Gurgel Carajás fell dramatically. For Gurgel, this vehicle had been very profitable until 1990; in January 1991, regular production was halted. The Carajás remained available on order until Gurgel's 1994 bankruptcy.
