= Gurgel Itaipu =

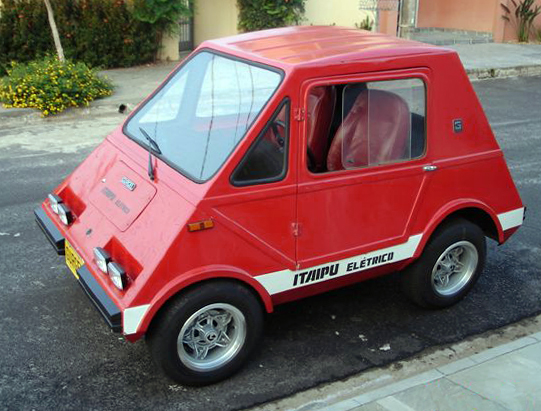
- Itaipu E150/II

Overview
- Manufacturer: Gurgel
- Production: 1975
- Assembly: Rio Claro, São Paulo, Brazil

Body and chassis
- Class: city car
- Body style: 2–door sedan

Powertrain
- Electric motor: 3,000 W (3.0 kW; 4.0 hp), 120 V
- Transmission: Single speed reduction gear
- Battery: 10 × 12V in series (lead-acid)
- Range: 60–80 km (37–50 mi)

Dimensions
- Wheelbase: 1,620 mm (63.8 in)
- Length: 2,650 mm (104.3 in)
- Width: 1,400 mm (55.1 in)
- Height: 1,450 mm (57.1 in)
- Curb weight: 780 kg (1,720 lb)

The Gurgel Itaipu E150 is an electric car, produced by the Brazilian automobile manufacturer Gurgel. The Itaipu was presented at the Salão do Automóvel in 1974, with an intended production start in December 1975. Only a few of these cars were produced and is today a collector's item. Top speed was of the first prototypes were of approximately 30 km/h (19 mph) and the latest models reached up to 60 km/h (37 mph). While about twenty pre-series cars were built, it was never commercialized. It was the first electric car built in Latin America, and, its specifications were comparable to similar models of the time (see CitiCar). The car was named after the hydro-electric dam and power plant on the border of Brazil and Paraguay.

The car's design was unique, a very compact trapezoidal two-seater. The car itself weighed a mere 460 kg (1,014 lb), with the remaining 320 kg (705 lb) consisting of batteries. The name "Itaipu" was brought back for a larger commercial vehicle in 1980, called the Itaipu E400. This was based on the Volkswagen-engined Gurgel G800.

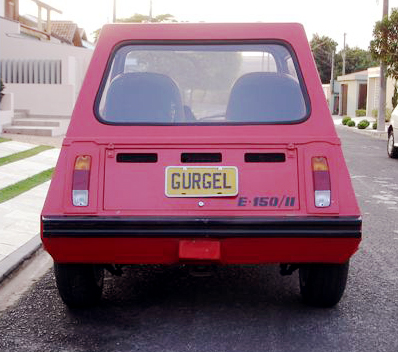
Rear view of Itaipu E150/II
