= Gurgel Supermini =

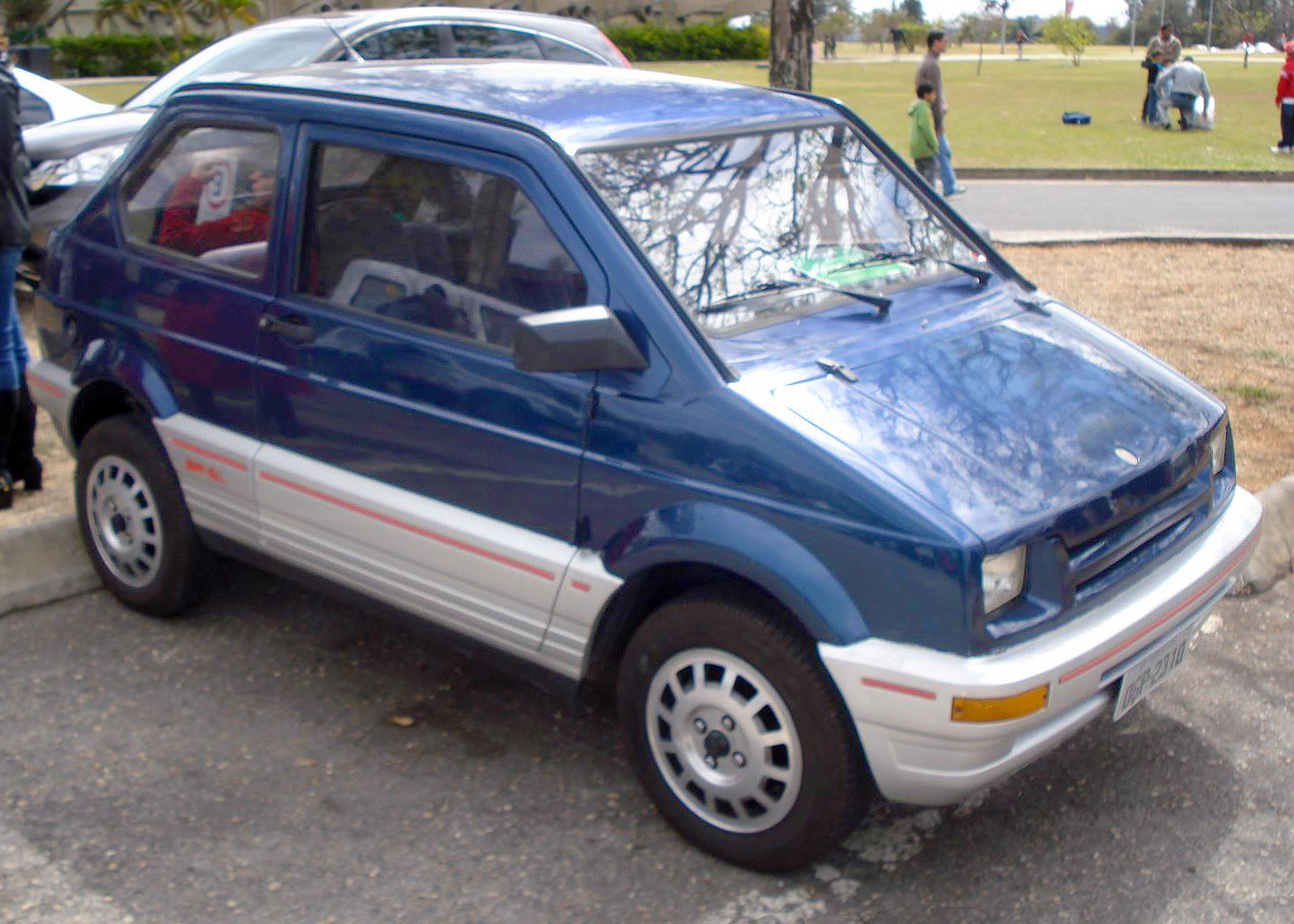
- Gurgel Supermini

Overview
- Manufacturer: Gurgel
- Production: 1992-1994
- Assembly: Brazil

Body and chassis
- Class: City car (A)
- Body style: Four-seater 3-door hatchback
- Layout: Front-engine, rear-wheel drive

Powertrain
- Engine: Naturally aspirated 792 cc (48.3 cu in) longitudinal flat-twin
- Transmission: Four-speed manual

Dimensions
- Curb weight: 645 kg (1,422 lb)

The Gurgel Supermini is a city car produced in Brazil by Gurgel from 1992 to 1994.

Compared to its predecessor Gurgel BR-800, the Supermini had a better finish, with improvements to the body and the engine. The engine was a naturally aspirated, water-cooled, 792 cc flat-twin. It was fed fuel by a single Brosol H 36 carburetor. An Alfa 1 28 carburetor was optionally available. The most powerful version of the car got larger intake valves, increasing the engine power rating by 4 horsepower - thus offering 36 hp (26 kW) at 5500 rpm. Its torque was 65 N⋅m (48 lb⋅ft) at 2500 rpm. The horizontal windows were also replaced by vertical ones.

The Supermini was very lightweight, weighing only 645 kg (1,422 lb). Its fuel tank capacity was 10.6 gallons. The Supermini had a top speed of 110 km/h (68 mph). Its longitudinal engine was in the front, despite it being rear-wheel drive. The Supermini has a four-speed manual transmission.

Despite its size, the Supermini was a four-seater. It came only in a three-door hatchback version.

Its peak of production was in its first months of 1992, before the factory went into bankruptcy. Gurgel was not able to compete in an open market.
