= Gurgel Itaipu E400 =

The Gurgel Itaipu E400 was a Brazilian electric vehicle with a plastic body. It was produced between 1981 and 1983. It was produced in two types: van and pickup. The car was essentially a rebodied Volkswagen Type 2 ("Kombi"), fitted with an electric engine and batteries. The design was similar overall, but with a rounded, bulbous nose. Its very limited range and expensive batteries resulted in it being a commercial failure. At a steady speed of 50 km/h (31 mph), a 100 km (62 mi) range was promised. Gurgel had already built the Itaipu E150 city car, which was followed by the Itaipu E400 electric van. Around 200 were produced overall, nearly entirely for Brazilian government agencies. One single example was bought by a private owner. In 1983, the weight capacity was increased to 400 kg (882 lb) and the name changed to Gurgel E500. A version retaining the Volkswagen petrol engine was also built, called the Gurgel G800.
