= List of trolleybus systems in Brazil =

This is a list of trolleybus systems in Brazil by Estado. It includes all trolleybus systems, past and present.

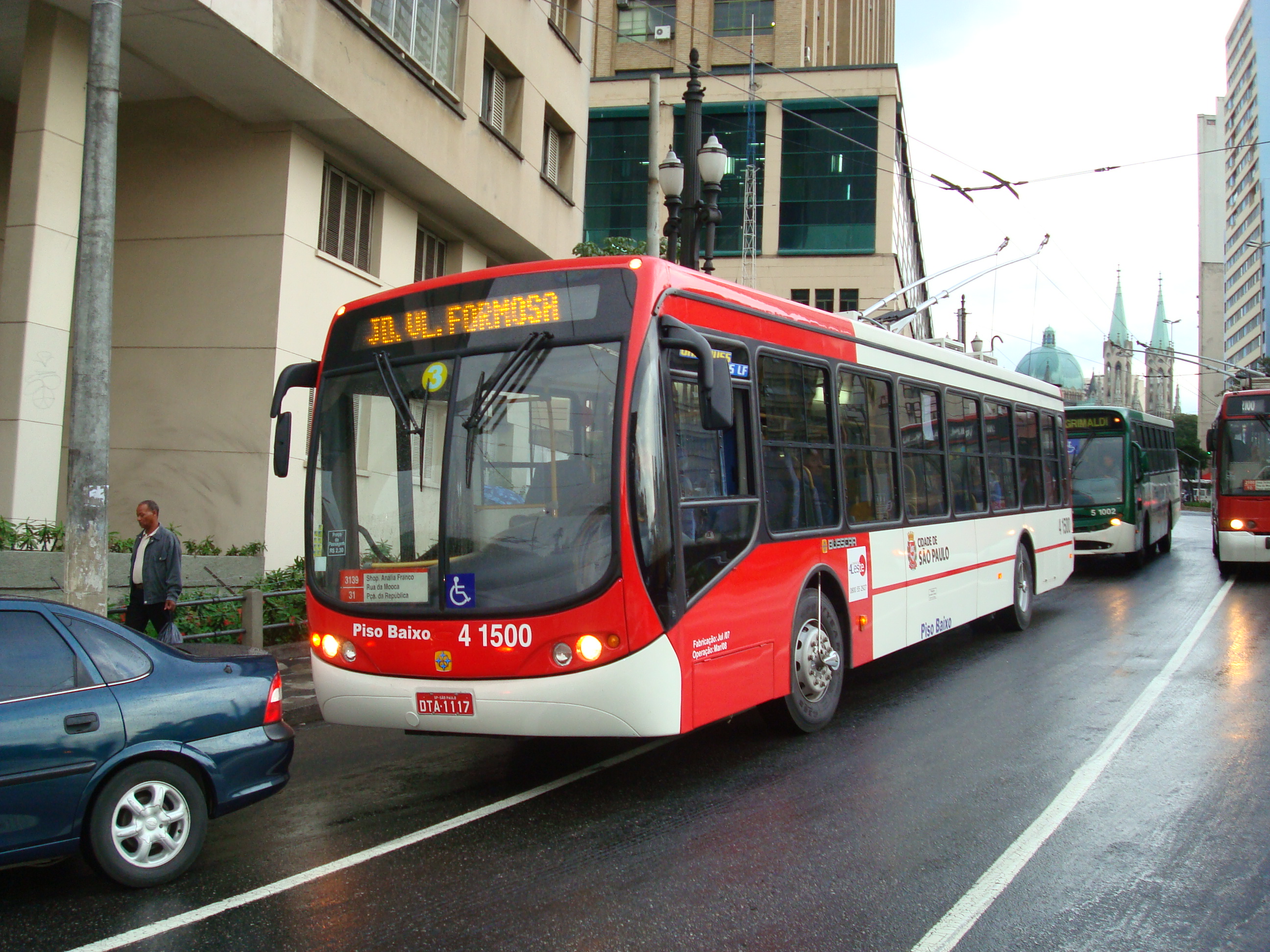
Busscar trolleybus in São Paulo, Brazil

== Bahia ==
Name of system	Location	Date (from)	Date (to)	Notes
	Salvador	9 January 1959	June 1968	

== Ceará ==
Name of system	Location	Date (from)	Date (to)	Notes
	Fortaleza	25 January 1967	February 1972	

== Minas Gerais ==
Name of system	Location	Date (from)	Date (to)	Notes
	Belo Horizonte	30 May 1953	22 January 1969	Construction of a second system was started, in the late 1980s, but never completed, and the plans were eventually cancelled.

== Pernambuco ==
Name of system	Location	Date (from)	Date (to)	Notes
	Recife	15 June 1960	24 September 2001	

== Rio de Janeiro ==
Name of system	Location	Date (from)	Date (to)	Notes
	Campos (dos Goytacazes)	29 June 1958	12 June 1967	
	Niterói	21 November 1953	10 November 1967	
	Rio de Janeiro:			
	♦ Zona Norte	April 1965	April 1971 (?)	
	♦ Zona Sul	3 September 1962	July 1968 (?)	

== Rio Grande do Sul ==
Name of system	Location	Date (from)	Date (to)	Notes
	Porto Alegre	7 December 1963	19 May 1969	

== São Paulo ==
Name of system	Location	Date (from)	Date (to)	Notes
	Araraquara	27 December 1959	20 November 2000	
	Ribeirão Preto	24 July 1982	2 July 1999	
	Rio Claro	9 May 1986	July 1993	
	Santos	12 August 1963		See also Trolleybuses in Santos.
SPTrans (urban)	São Paulo	22 April 1949		See also Trolleybuses in São Paulo.
Corredor Metropolitano São Mateus - Jabaquara - EMTU, (METRA), (Next Mobilidade)	Greater São Paulo	3 December 1988		Serves neighboring towns including Diadema, São Bernardo do Campo and Santo André. See also Trolleybuses in São Paulo and São Mateus–Jabaquara Metropolitan Corridor.

== See also ==
- List of trolleybus systems, for all other countries
- List of town tramway systems in Brazil
- List of light-rail transit systems
- List of rapid transit systems
- Trolleybus usage by country

== Sources ==
=== Books and periodicals ===
- Murray, Alan. 2000. World Trolleybus Encyclopaedia (ISBN 0-904235-18-1). Reading, Berkshire, UK: Trolleybooks.
- Peschkes, Robert. 1980. World Gazetteer of Tram, Trolleybus, and Rapid Transit Systems - Part One, Latin America (ISBN 1-898319-02-2). Exeter, UK: Quail Map Company.
- Trolleybus Magazine (ISSN 0266-7452). National Trolleybus Association (UK). Bimonthly.

=== Website ===
- Morrison, Allen (November 2007). Latin American Trolleybus Installations Retrieved on 2010-04-05.
