= Carbuss =

Brazilian bus manufacturer

Carbuss - Indústria de Carrocerias Catarinense Ltda.
- Type: Subsidiary
- Industry: Automotive
- Predecessor: Busscar
- Founded: June 13, 2017; 9 years ago
- Founder: Maurício Lourenço da Cunha
- Headquarters: Joinville, Brazil
- Area served: Brazil
- Key people: Sergio Souza
- Products: Buses
- Owner: Maurício Lourenço da Cunha
- Number of employees: 500 (2018)
- Parent: CAIO Induscar
- Website: novabusscar.com.br

Carbuss - Indústria de Carrocerias Catarinense Ltda. is a Brazilian bus manufacturer. The company is based in Joinville in the south of Brazil, where it operates industrial premises that cover 1,000,000 m^{2} (11,000,000 sq ft) of land. The premises previously belonged to another bus manufacturer, Busscar, before its bankruptcy in 2012.

== History ==
The business had its origins in a firm created upon the purchase of the Joinville factory from Busscar. A R$9.4 million cash deposit and another R$57.74 million to be paid in 52 installments with monetary correction was invested in the company. On 12 June 2017, the company received the name Carbuss.

The company planned to hire 500 employees by 2018. Following the evaluation of all property to see what could still be used, the hiring of 80 production staff commenced. Some ten thousand résumés were received, and preference was given to employees who had been laid off by the former Busscar administration.

A separate investor group acquired the Busscar brand, equipment, projects, and industrial parks. The company assumed none of the old debts. Busscar Colombia continues to operate as an independent company. Although Carbuss and Busscar are different companies, they conduct technology exchanges and use similar sales structures and logistics. Company's owner is not named Caio.

The owners stated that a complete redesign of the product line, including the commercial names of the models, was carried out, though in a similar style as prior Busscar models. Emissions standards were updated to Euro 5.

After five years of inactivity, the factory began producing buses on 2 May 2018, with investments exceeding R$100 million. Three chassis were initially produced: a Vissta Bus 360 for Viação Paraty in Araraquara Brazil, a customer who asked to receive the first chassis, a Vissta Bus 340 for Viação Osasco for use by the EMTU in Greater São Paulo, and a Vissta Bus DD demonstrative.

Ten months after the acquisition, the new owners had already hired 180 employees, with a goal of 500 to 800 employees for the end of 2018.

== Models ==
- El Buss 320 2019
- Vissta Buss 340
- Vissta Buss 360
- Vissta Buss 400 LD
- Vissta Buss DD
