= G stock =

G stock may refer to:

- London Underground G Stock
- São Paulo Metro G stock
