= Trolleybuses in Santos =

Transit system in São Paulo, Brazil

Coordinates: 23°56′S 46°20′W

Santos trolleybus system
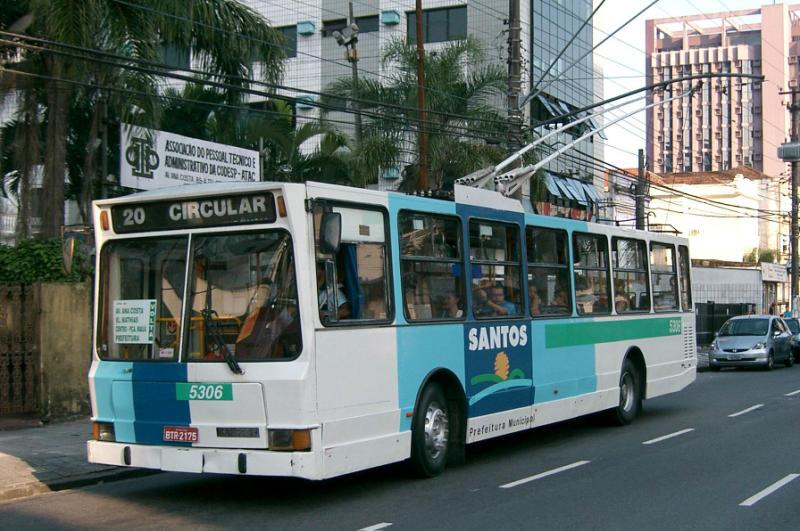
- A Mafersa/Villares trolleybus in Santos, 2005.

Operation
- Locale: Santos, São Paulo, Brazil
- Open: 1963
- Status: Indefinitely suspended (motorbuses substituted) since 2021, for reasons related to the COVID-19 pandemic
- Routes: 1
- Operators: Serviço Municipal de Transportes Coletivos (SMTC) (1963–1976); Companhia Santista de Transportes Coletivos (CSTC) (1976–1998); Viação Piracicabana (since 1998)

Statistics
- Website: http://www.santosonibus.com.br Viação Piracicabana (in Portuguese)

The Santos trolleybus system forms part of the public transport network in Santos, a municipality in the state of São Paulo, Brazil. Opened on 12 August 1963, it presently comprises only one line, and, along with the two São Paulo metropolitan area trolleybus systems, is one of only three trolleybus systems still operating in Brazil.

== History ==
=== Beginnings ===
Initially, only a few trolleybus lines were opened in Santos. They were operated by a batch of Fiat-Alfa Romeo vehicles and equipment based in the Port of Santos during the first year of operation of the service.

At that time, trams were still circulating in Santos. Due to the technical characteristics of the trolley, the then SMTC (Serviço Municipal de Transportes Coletivos) (English: Municipal Collective Transport Service) installed trolleybus lines in streets and avenues where there were no tram lines, apart from some inevitable exceptions.

Although both the trams and trolley buses were powered by direct current electricity, the voltage of the two systems was different: the trolleybuses used two overhead wires: the positive and negative, whereas the tram network used only one wire, the positive pole, with the rails as the negative pole. In many narrow streets, it was not technically feasible to operate trams and trolleybuses together, because a large amount of wiring would be necessary.

Thus, the first trolleybus lines generally covered the streets and avenues where there were no trams. However, there were some points where trolleybuses and trams operated together. These included Bartolomeu de Gusmão Avenue between Osvaldo Cruz Street and Conselheiro Nébias Avenue; Washington Luiz Avenue, between Martim Francisco Street and Dr. Carvalho de Mendonça; Praça da Independência, and several other places where there was the crossing of the overhead wires.

=== Growth ===
Santos's first trolleybus line, opened on 12 August 1963, was line 5, which linked Rua Martim Afonso with Praça Visconde de Itaboraí, via Avenida Washington Luiz. Almost a year later, on 3 August 1964, a second line, line 53, was added to the system. Nicknamed O Trólebus do Orquidário (English: The Trolleybuses of Orchids), it also followed Avenida Washington Luiz, but proceeded towards the end of the famous tourist spot, at José Menino.

On 5 March 1965, a third line was opened, line 54. Once again, it ran along Avenida Washington Luiz, but this time was bound for Ferry Boat.

On 21 October 1966, line 8 was opened. Its route included that of three tram lines (5, 8 and 15), and was bound for the Macuco, via Mercado. Shortly afterwards, on 1 December 1966, trams stopped running in Avenida Conselheiro Nébias. Following the removal of the tramway wiring, that avenue then became the central terminus of the trolleybus system, with overhead trolleybus wires, new lighting, and asphalt paving.

In early 1967, Avenida Conselheiro Nébias had its trolleybus overhead wires installed, initially to Avenida Afonso Pena. On 26 January 1967, the first line of that avenue was inaugurated: line 45 to Praça Visconde de Itaboraí (via Pena). In April 1967, with the installation of trolleybus wires along the rest of Avenida Conselheiro Nébias, came the opening of line 44 to Praia do Boqueirão (on 11 April) and line 4 (on 13 April). Upon the entry of line 4 into service, the earlier line 54 was closed.

On 6 October 1967, line 40 was added to the system. This line also followed Avenida Conselheiro Nébias, bound for Gonzaga and Praça da Independência, and was later extended to Orquidário. Also in 1967, overhead trolleybus wires were installed on Avenida Nossa Senhora de Fátima. It was planned to import over 25 trolleybus to operate under these new wires. However, the municipality then decided to purchase diesel buses instead, and so the overhead wires were never used, with no additional trolleybuses being imported. The wiring remained installed, but unused, for more than four years.

In 1970, line 44 was extended to the Praça Coração de Maria, in the Ponta da Praia. That same year, line 43 was created, to link Orquidário with Ponta da Praia. This line operated only on Sundays and holidays, and was aimed at tourists. In November 1970, the route of line 5 was changed, to pass through Praça da Independência. The city's last tram line (until the opening of a heritage tram line several years later) closed on 28 February 1971.

=== Contraction ===
By late 1970, most of the trolleybuses were out of service, because of their poor state of repair. In 1972, trolleybus no 542 was converted to diesel, as a prototype. In that form, it remained in operation for many years and, along with the other 49 Italian made vehicles, travelled the trolleybus lines.

In 1976, the Companhia Santista de Transportes Coletivos (CSTC) (English:Santista Public Transport Company) was created to operate public transport services in Santos, replacing the former SMTC. Line 45, considered surplus to requirements, was abandoned in mid-1977. The following year, lines 40 and 53 were similarly closed, this time due to traffic in the opposite direction on Avenue Marechal Floriano Peixoto. The remaining trolleybuses were used to operate a newly created line 50, a remake of the old line 54 (Washington Luiz–Ferry Boat). By then, it was clear that the fleet was diminishing, due to shortage of parts, wear and weathering.

=== Fightback ===
In 1979, a program of revitalization of the trolleybus system began. A total of 25 existing trolleybuses were renovated, other trolleybuses were gradually retired, and eight new trolleybuses were acquired. With the changes in the number of trolleybuses in circulation, some lines were shut down but later revived.

In 1980, line 44 was reactivated as a line to Orquidário, via Rua Euclides da Cunha, but not in the opposite direction. Later that year, the trolleybus line running in the opposite direction along Avenida Epitácio Pessoa was relocated to the Avenida Bartolomeu de Gusmão.

On 26 January 1988, line 20 (Praça Maua – Praça Independencia via Avenida Ana Costa), which had previously been operated by conventional bus, was converted to trolleybuses, using a combination of existing wires and about 2.5 km of new wires on Avenida Ana Costa. The same day, six new Mafersa-built trolleybuses went into operation. A new express route, line 43, was opened to link Orquidário with Ferry Boat, and line 30, which connected the city centre with Gonzaga via Avenida Washington Luiz, was operated by conventional buses supplemented by trolleybuses, which terminated in the Praça José Bonifácio.

Additionally, work began on the installation of overhead wire to create a trolleybus line to the Northwest Zone, but this work was never completed.

=== Decline ===
In early 1990, the CSTC began to experience a serious crisis, resulting in the lack of maintenance of the Fiat-Alfa Romeo trolleybuses. Gradually that part of the fleet was scrapped.

In September 1993, lines 5,8, 40 and 53 were converted to conventional bus lines.

Trolleybuses ceased running on line 4 in September 1995, and in 1996 there was an auction of remaining Fiat-Alfa Romeo trolleybuses and almost all the Marcopolo vehicles. The trolleybus fleet was reduced to only six Mafersa trolleybuses and one Marcopolo trolleybus. Just a single trolleybus line, line 20, remained.

In 1998, the Viação Piracicabana company took over mass transit in the city, including the sole remaining trolleybus line 20, and the fleet of seven trolleybuses. In 2005, the Marcopolo vehicle was withdrawn, leaving the six Mafersa trolleybuses. Line 20 has continued to be operated by the Mafersa trolleybuses and also by diesel buses.

== Current line ==
Since 1995, line 20 has been the only trolleybus line operating in Santos, operated by a fleet of six trolleybuses (seven until 2005). The line's service also used one municipal diesel bus.

Due to the expansion works on the Tourist Tram, the terminus of line 20 was shifted temporarily in September 2008 from Praça Mauá to Praça Rui Barbosa, the intended terminus of the new tram line. In October 2009, after completion of the tramway overhead lines, the terminus of trolleybus line 20 was moved back to Mauá.

Around April 2020, motorbuses took over for trolleybuses on the route, for reasons related to the COVID-19 pandemic, which brought service reductions that left only a single vehicle duty on the route, and the trolleybuses are high-floor vehicle lacking wheelchair lifts; a low-floor bus was substituted for an indefinite period. Except for an approximately two-week period in March 2021, trolleybus service has remained suspended (as of late 2024).

== Tourist line proposal ==
The city of Santos has also floated the possibility of a tourist trolleybus line. In 2008, there was a proposal for heritage trolleybuses to operate on a line supplementing the existing system of tourist trams in the city. The Mafersa trolleybuses already operating in the city could possibly be used for this proposed service, and for students.

In addition to the Mafersa trolleybuses, there is a body of an old Fiat-Alfa Romeo trolleybus on the premises of the old CSTC, and some trolleybuses from the São Paulo system, that could be renovated and incorporated into the tourist fleet.

== Fleet ==
=== Past fleet ===
The original Santos trolleybus fleet was 49 Alfa Romeo-Fiat trolleybuses with Pistoiesi bodies and Marelli electrical equipment, imported from Italy and built in 1961/62. The number ordered was 50, but one fell into the harbour while being unloaded from the ship during delivery and was not replaced. They were originally numbered 500–598, even numbers only. They had a capacity for 95 passengers (52 seated and 43 standing) each, and were similar to the imported trolleybuses used in Rio de Janeiro and Salvador, Bahia. By 1980, the number of serviceable trolleybuses had gradually declined to fewer than 25, because of a lack of spare parts.

Beginning in 1979, the revitalization of the trolleybus system began with the start of a program to refurbish 25 of the Fiat-Alfa Romeo trolleybuses. The first refurbished vehicle returned to service in November 1980, renumbered 605 (ex-502), and the number had increased to seven by the end of 1981, renumbered 605, 610, 615, 620, 625, 630, and 635. In the same period, new Marcopolo vehicles (with Scania chassis) were also acquired: a 1979 prototype, numbered 600, followed in 1982 by five production-series units, Nos. 1000, 1010, 1020, 1030, and 1040. By 1985, 24 of the Alfa Romeo-Fiat trolleybuses had been refurbished and given new fleet numbers in the range 605–720 (multiples of five only).

In 1987, six new Mafersa trolleybuses were purchased and were numbered 2005/15/25/35/45/55. By 1993, only 10 of the refurbished 1961/62 trolleybuses were still in service, and fourteen others were scrapped during that year, to provide parts. Six Alfa Romeo-Fiat trolleybuses remained in service in mid-1995: Nos. 635, 670, 675, 695, 710, and 715.

In 1996, there was an auction of the remaining Fiat-Alfa Romeo trolleybuses and almost all of the Marcopolo trolleybuses. The trolleybus fleet was reduced to only 6 Mafersa vehicles, and one Marcopolo trolleybus. The latter was No. 600, the 1979 prototype which was first trolleybus ever built by Marcopolo (using a Scania chassis), the six 1982 production-series units having been retired earlier. After the Piracicabana Company took over operation of the system, in 1998, the fleet was renumbered, with Marcopolo No. 600 becoming 5301 and Mafersas 2005/15/25/35/45/55 becoming 5302–5307. In 2005, Marcopolo trolleybus 5301 of 1979 was retired, leaving only the Mafersa trolleybuses in the fleet.

=== Current fleet ===
- Nos. 5302–5307, built in 1987 by Mafersa/Villares. Two-axle, high-floor vehicles.

== Depot ==
Santos has one trolleybus depot, at the end of Avenida Francisco Manoel, next to the Santa Casa de Santos.

== See also ==
- List of trolleybus systems in Brazil
