= E stock =

E stock may refer to:

- London Underground E Stock
- São Paulo Metro E stock
