= São Paulo Metro G stock =

Type of electric urban train

G stock
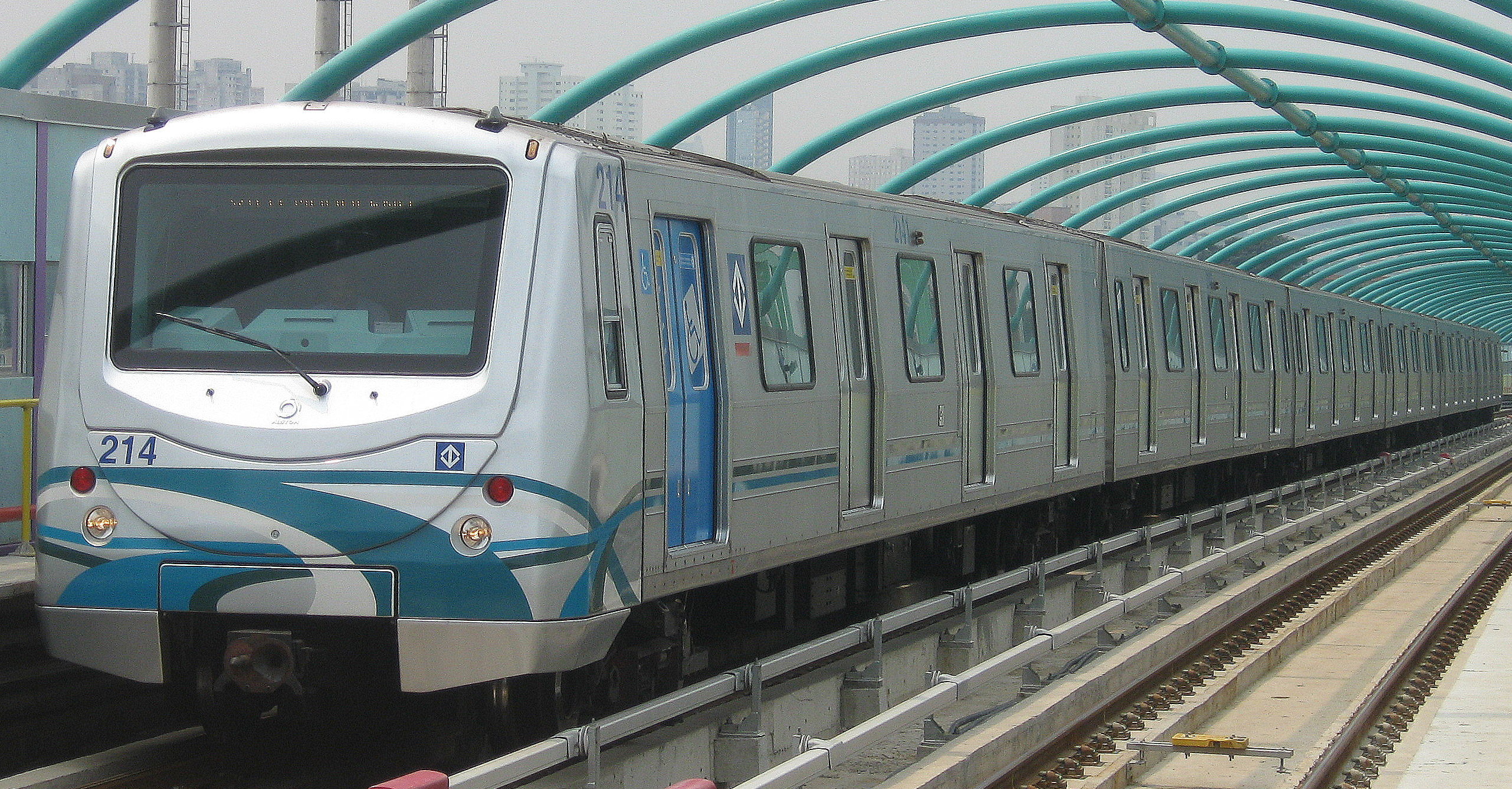
- A G14 train close to Tamanduateí station

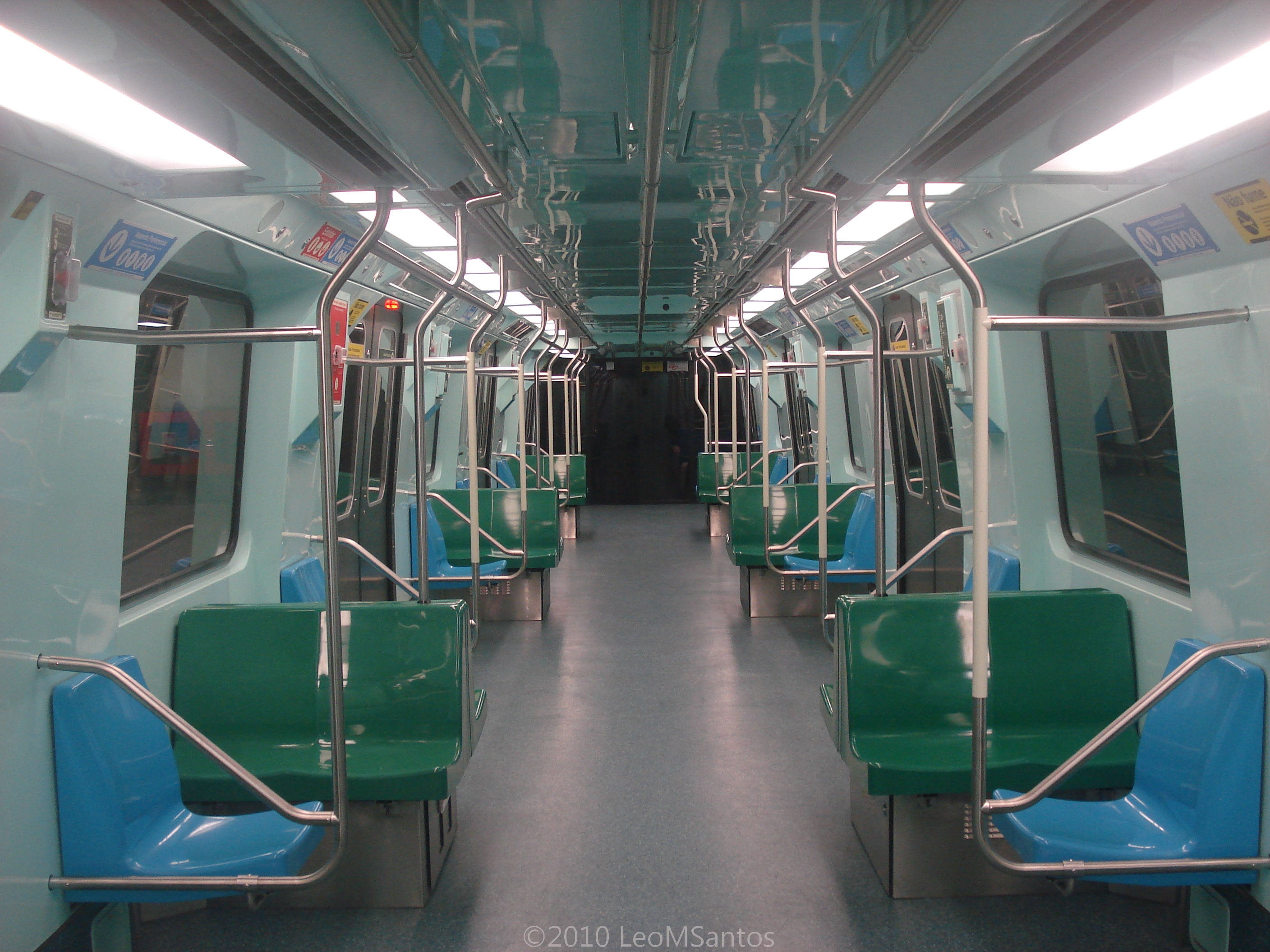
- In service: 2009–present
- Manufacturer: Alstom
- Built at: São Paulo, Brazil
- Constructed: 2007–2009
- Entered service: 2009
- Number built: 16
- Number in service: 16
- Formation: 6-car sets (A–B–B–B–B–A)
- Fleet numbers: G12–G28
- Capacity: 2,046 (if 8 passengers/m²)
- Operator: São Paulo Metro
- Depots: Itaquera; Belém; Jabaquara
- Line served: Line 3 (São Paulo Metro)

Specifications
- Car body construction: Stainless steel
- Train length: 130.5 m (428 ft 2 in)
- Width: 3.1 m (10 ft 2 in)
- Height: 3.62 m (11 ft 11 in)
- Floor height: 1,113 mm (3 ft 7.8 in)
- Entry: Level
- Doors: 8 sets of side doors per car
- Maximum speed: 90 km/h (56 mph)
- Traction system: Alstom ONIX 172 MP IGBT–VVVF
- Traction motors: 24 × Alstom 4EXA 1828 A 180 kW (240 hp) asynchronous 3-phase AC
- Power output: 4,320 kW (5,790 hp)
- Acceleration: 1.12 m/s^{2} (3.7 ft/s^{2})
- Deceleration: 1.2 m/s^{2} (3.9 ft/s^{2}) (service); 1.5 m/s^{2} (4.9 ft/s^{2}) (emergency)
- HVAC: Air conditioning
- Electric systems: 750 V DC third rail
- Current collection: Contact shoe
- UIC classification: Bo′Bo′+Bo′Bo′+Bo′Bo′+Bo′Bo′+Bo′Bo′+Bo′Bo′
- Bogies: Hard "H"
- Braking systems: Regenerative and Rheostatic (in stations); Pneumatic (friction)
- Coupling system: N2 type (A cars)
- Track gauge: 1,600 mm (5 ft 3 in)

The São Paulo Metro G stock is a class of electric multiple units built between 2007 and 2009 by Alstom to operate on Line 2-Green.

== History ==
=== Project and construction ===
With the expansion of the metro network, emerged a necessity to expand its rolling stock. In 1991, the São Paulo Metropolitan Company published the bid n° 00800310 for the acquisition of 67 trains of 6 cars each, divided as follows:

- Allotment I – 45 trains for Vila Madalena–Vila Prudente Line
- Allotment II – 22 trains, with 16 to complement the Line 3 fleet and 6 for the Itaquera–Guianases expansion

In 2007, the São Paulo Metropolitan Company made a 15% additive on the Allotment II contract. Until then, 11 trains of this contract were delivered, being name E stock. This contract change created a legal controversy. The trains were built in Alstom factory, located in the Lapa district in São Paulo and delivered in 2009. During the project phase, the adoption of air conditioning system reduced the internal height of the trains, gaining controversy in the press.

=== Service ===
The first train was delivered on 28 March 2009 in Alto do Ipiranga station. Sometime later, a failure in the wheels axles was found, which could cause an improper longitudinal movement on the axle. This movement could cause a derailment. Due to this, all of the G stock was recalled for tests and repairs. Later, it was found that IESA, Alstom's sub-supplier, pressed the wheels on the axles with a damaged hydraulic press.

== Controversies ==
To expand its fleet, the Metropolitan Company used in 2007 the 1992 contract to acquire 16 more trains (a 15% additive compared to the original contract). Therefore, new Alstom trains were acquired, being named the G stock. This legal maneuver, however, was pleaded guilty by the State Court of Accounts of São Paulo in November 2017 because, according to the court, the maximum expire date of the contracts could not be over 5 years, and this bid expired in 1997.

== See also ==
- São Paulo Metro E stock
- Line 1 (São Paulo Metro)
- Line 3 (São Paulo Metro)
- São Paulo Metro
