= Mafersa =

Brazilian bus and train manufacturer

Mafersa S.A.
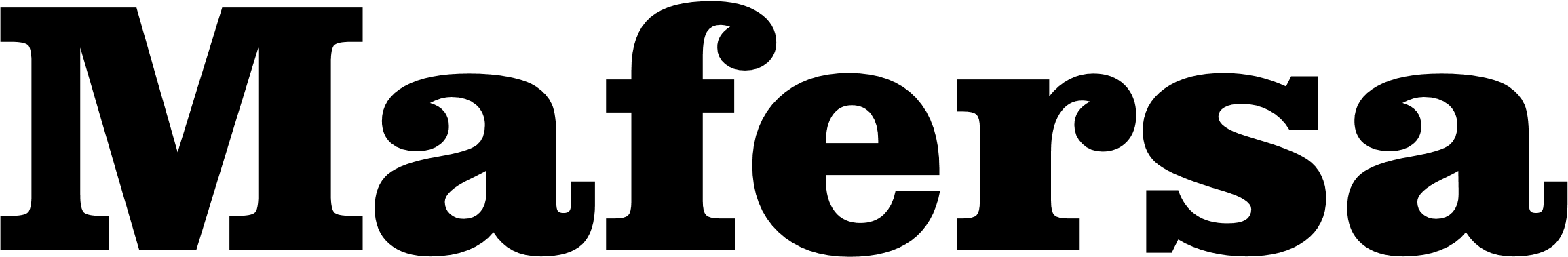

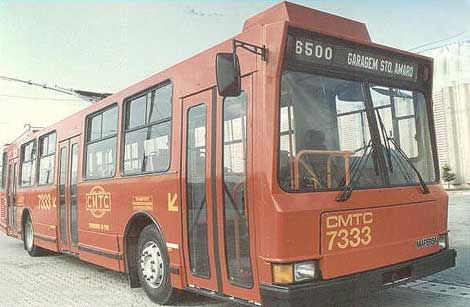
- Mafersa trolleybus that belonged to CMTC, former transportation authority of São Paulo, Brazil
- Type: Subsidiary
- Industry: Rail transport
- Founded: 1927; 99 years ago
- Fate: Acquired
- Successor: Alstom
- Headquarters: São Paulo, Brazil
- Area served: Worldwide
- Products: Locomotives; High-speed trains Intercity and commuter trains Trams; People movers Signalling systems Trolleybus; Buses
- Owner: Budd Company (1927-1997); Alstom (1997-Present)

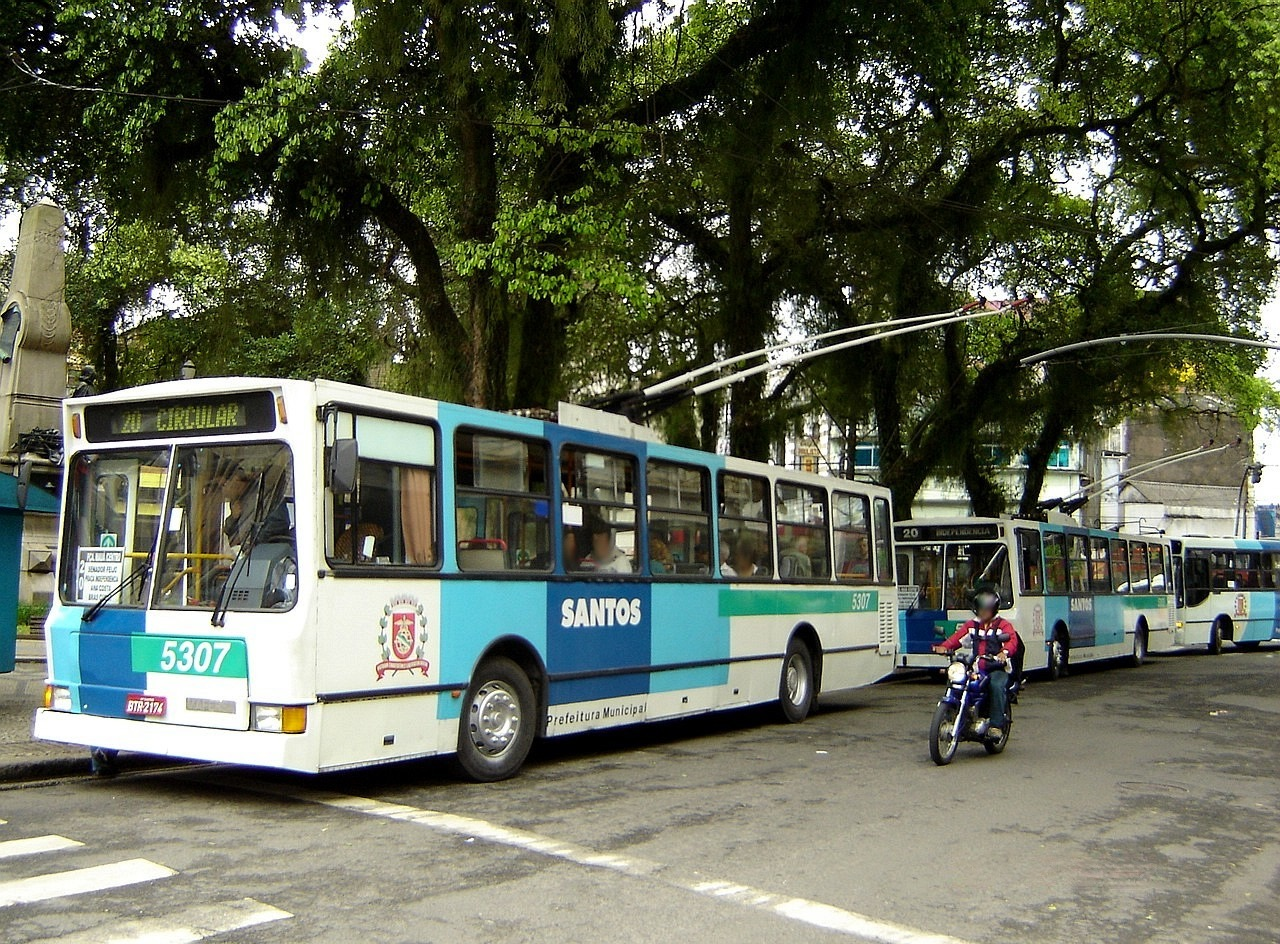
Mafersa/Villares trolleybus on route 20 in Santos, Brazil

Mafersa S.A. is a Brazilian manufacturer of passenger rail cars, buses and trolleybuses, and related components. It was founded in 1944 and was located in the city of São Paulo. At the end of 1997 it became a subsidiary of Alstom.

Most of its customers were in Brazil. However, export orders included, in 1990–92, 38 stainless-steel push-pull commuter rail cars for the Virginia Railway Express (10 control cars [cab-equipped trailers] and 28 trailers) and 256 metro-car bodyshells for the Chicago Transit Authority (as a subcontractor to Morrison-Knudsen). In the mid-1980s the company built more than 270 metro cars for Rio de Janeiro and more than 400 for São Paulo, and these were built under license from the Budd Company.

In addition to building new rail vehicles, Mafersa also carried out overhauls of existing rail cars.

In 1997, Mafersa was acquired by Alstom. A subsidiary of Alstom keeping the same name, Mafersa SA, continued producing rail vehicle components (such as wheels and axles), while manufacturing of rail cars also continued but now under the name, "Alstom Transporte do Brazil S.A." Alstom sold the technology and license of Mafersa SA to MWL Brasil Rodas & Eixos Ltda. in November 1999, and this company continued making rail-vehicle components, initially under the Mafersa name.

== Buses ==
Mafersa entered the field of bus manufacturing in 1985, with development of a bus chassis and a monocoque (or integral) trolleybus. Production of trolleybuses lasted only from 1986 until 1988 and was relatively small, totalling only 85 vehicles, of which 84 were two-axle vehicles and one was articulated. Between the start of production in 1985/86 and 1988 more than 600 diesel buses had been delivered to various cities.

== See also ==
- Trolleybuses in Santos
- Trolleybuses in São Paulo
