= São Paulo Metro E stock =

Class of electric multiple units built by Alstom

E stock
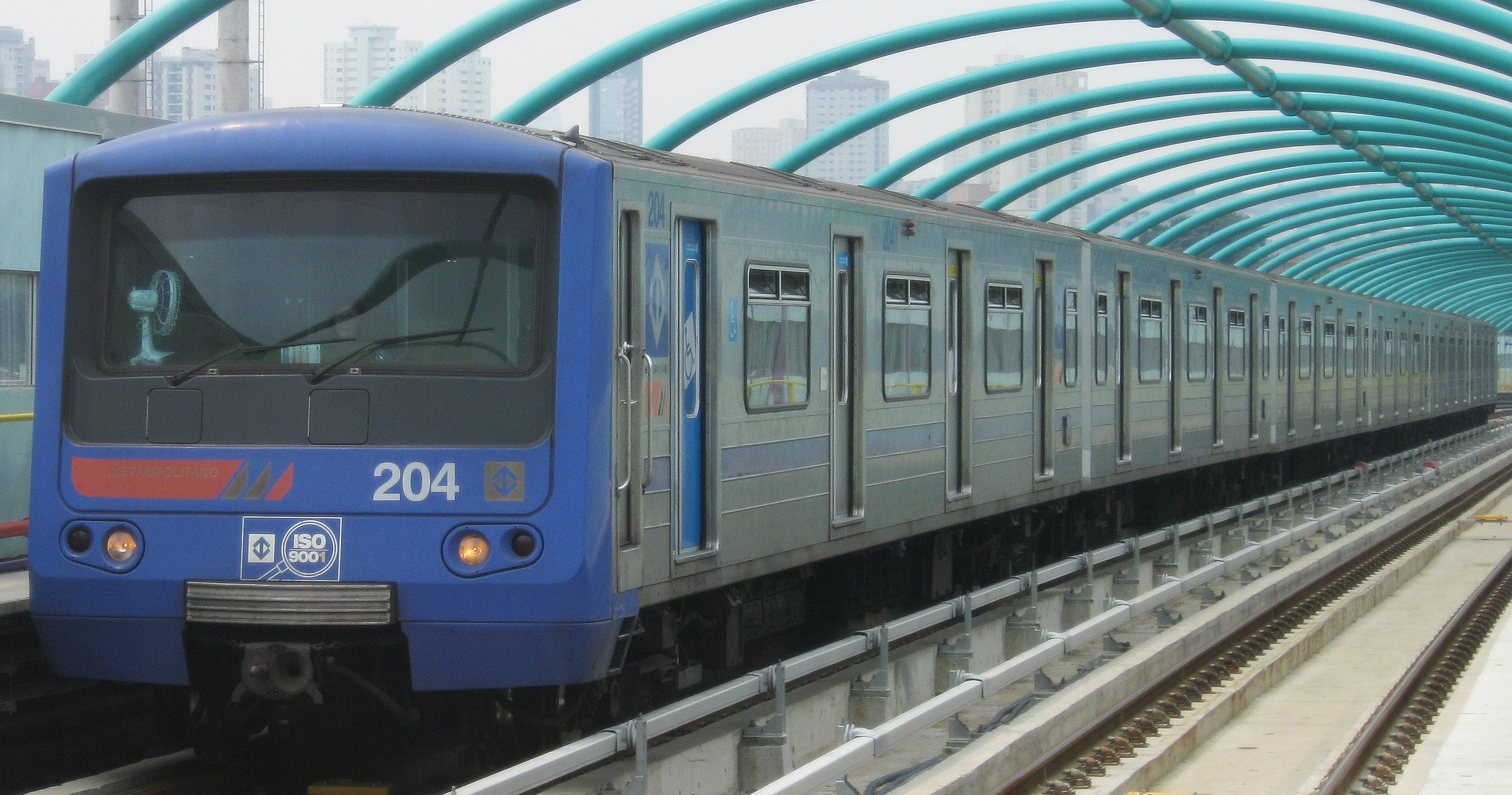
- An 204 train (E04) close to Tamanduateí station

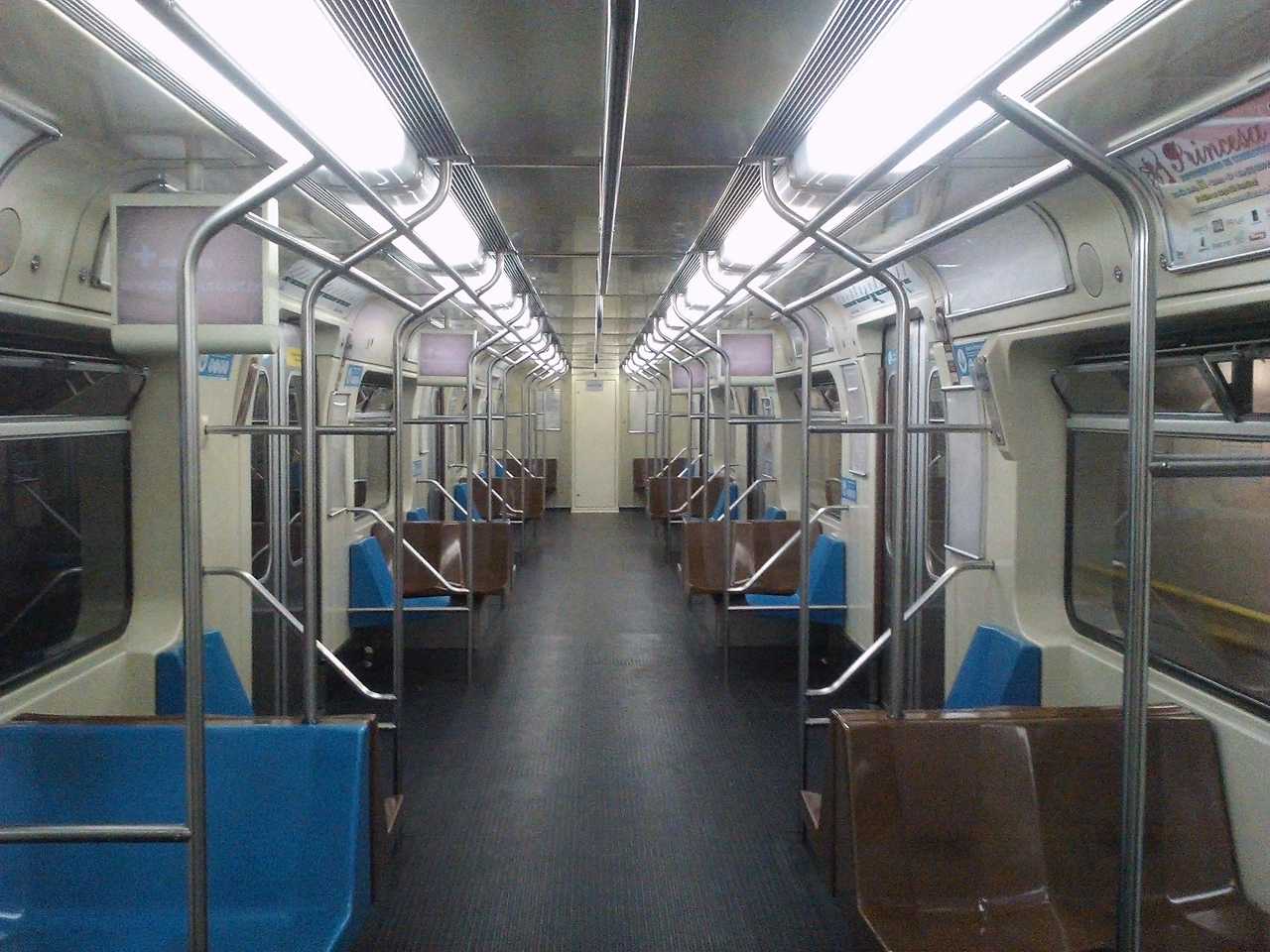
- In service: 1999–present
- Manufacturer: Alstom
- Built at: São Paulo, Brazil
- Constructed: 1996–1999
- Entered service: 1999
- Number built: 11 sets
- Number in service: 11 sets
- Formation: 6-car sets (A–B–B–B–B–A)
- Fleet numbers: E01–E11
- Capacity: 2,004 (if 8 passengers/m²)
- Operator: São Paulo Metro
- Depot: Jabaquara
- Line served: Line 1 (São Paulo Metro)

Specifications
- Car body construction: Stainless steel
- Train length: 130.5 m (428 ft 2 in)
- Car length: 21.13 m (69 ft 4 in)
- Width: 3.1 m (10 ft 2 in)
- Height: 3,571 mm (11 ft 8.6 in)
- Floor height: 1,113 mm (3 ft 7.8 in)
- Entry: Level
- Doors: 8 sets of side doors per car
- Maximum speed: 90 km/h (56 mph)
- Weight: 37,630 kg (82,960 lb) (A cars); 35,378 kg (77,995 lb) (B cars)
- Traction system: Chopper control
- Traction motors: 24 × 125 kW (168 hp) DC
- Power output: 3,000 kW (4,000 hp)
- Acceleration: 1.12 m/s^{2} (3.7 ft/s^{2})
- Deceleration: 1.2 m/s^{2} (3.9 ft/s^{2}) (service); 1.5 m/s^{2} (4.9 ft/s^{2}) (emergency)
- HVAC: Forced ventilation
- Current collection: Contact shoe
- UIC classification: Bo′Bo′+Bo′Bo′+Bo′Bo′+Bo′Bo′+Bo′Bo′+Bo′Bo′
- Bogies: Hard "H"
- Braking systems: Electric (rheostatic/regenerative) and by pneumatic discs brake
- Coupling system: N2 type (A cars); Semi-permanent (B cars)
- Track gauge: 1,600 mm (5 ft 3 in)

The São Paulo Metro E stock is a class of electric multiple units built by Alstom between 1996 and 1999.

== History ==
=== Project and construction ===
With the expansion of the metro network, there emerged a necessity to expand its rolling stock. In 1991, the São Paulo Metropolitan Company published tender #00800310 for the acquisition of 67 trains of 6 cars each, divided as follows:

- Allotment I – 45 trains for the Vila Madalena–Vila Prudente Line
- Allotment II – 22 trains, with 16 to complement the Line 3 fleet and 6 for the Itaquera–Guianases expansion

The bidding was won by Mafersa, but the company never could build the trains, as it went bankrupt in the midst of a severe economic crisis, potentialized by the lack of funds by the metro company to process such acquisition. However, part of the contract (Allotment II) was kept valid after a verdict of the State Court of Accounts of São Paulo in 1992, creating a legal controversy. The contract for Allotment II was assumed by French company Alstom.

Alstom resumed the construction of 11 trains of Allotment II in 1996, later delivered in September 1999. After that, the Metropolitan Company and Alstom staged a cultural competition to choose a new name for the new class of EMUs. The name "Milênio" (English: Millennium) was chosen, with a special logo below the train cab windshield. The winners received miniatures of the composition.

=== Service ===
Initially built to operate on Line 3-Red, the 11 trains were transferred to Line 2-Green, which did not have an own rolling stock. In 2014, this fleet had the largest number of failures among the São Paulo Metro's rolling stock, with inferior performance to the decades-old A stock, built between 1972 and 1978. According to specialists, the E stock project has errors in motorization, suspension and ventilation.

Currently, the E stock is the only fleet which lacks an air conditioning system. The E stock is slated to be retired in the coming years, replaced with the R stock, but the ultimate fate of this fleet was not confirmed. This class currently only operates on Line 1 of the São Paulo Metro.

== Controversies ==
To expand its fleet, the Metropolitan Company used in 2007 the 1992 contract to acquire 16 more trains (a 15% additive compared to the original contract). Therefore, new Alstom trains were acquired, being named the G stock. This legal maneuver, however, was judged illegal by the State Court of Accounts of São Paulo in November 2017 because, according to the court, the maximum expiry date of the contracts could not be over 5 years, and this bid expired in 1997.

== Accidents and incidents ==
- 23 December 2006 – A bomb was detonated in one of the E stock cars between Ana Rosa and Chácara Klabin stations. No one was harmed by the attack.

== See also ==
- Line 1 (São Paulo Metro)
- São Paulo Metro
