= Busscar =

Brazilian bus manufacturer

Busscar Ônibus S.A.
- Type: Sociedade anônima
- Industry: Automotive
- Founded: September 17, 1946
- Founder: Augusto Bruno Nielson; Eugênio Nielson
- Successor: Carbuss
- Headquarters: Joinville, Brazil
- Area served: Worldwide (Except Philippines)
- Products: Buses, coaches, trolleybuses
- Website: http://www.busscar.com.br

Busscar Ônibus S.A. was a Brazilian bus manufacturer that built coaches, trolleybuses, charter buses, and tour buses, founded on 17 September 1946. The company was based in Joinville in the south of Brazil, where it had industrial premises that covered 1,000,000 m^{2} (11,000,000 sq ft). Busscar went defunct on 27 September 2012.

== History ==
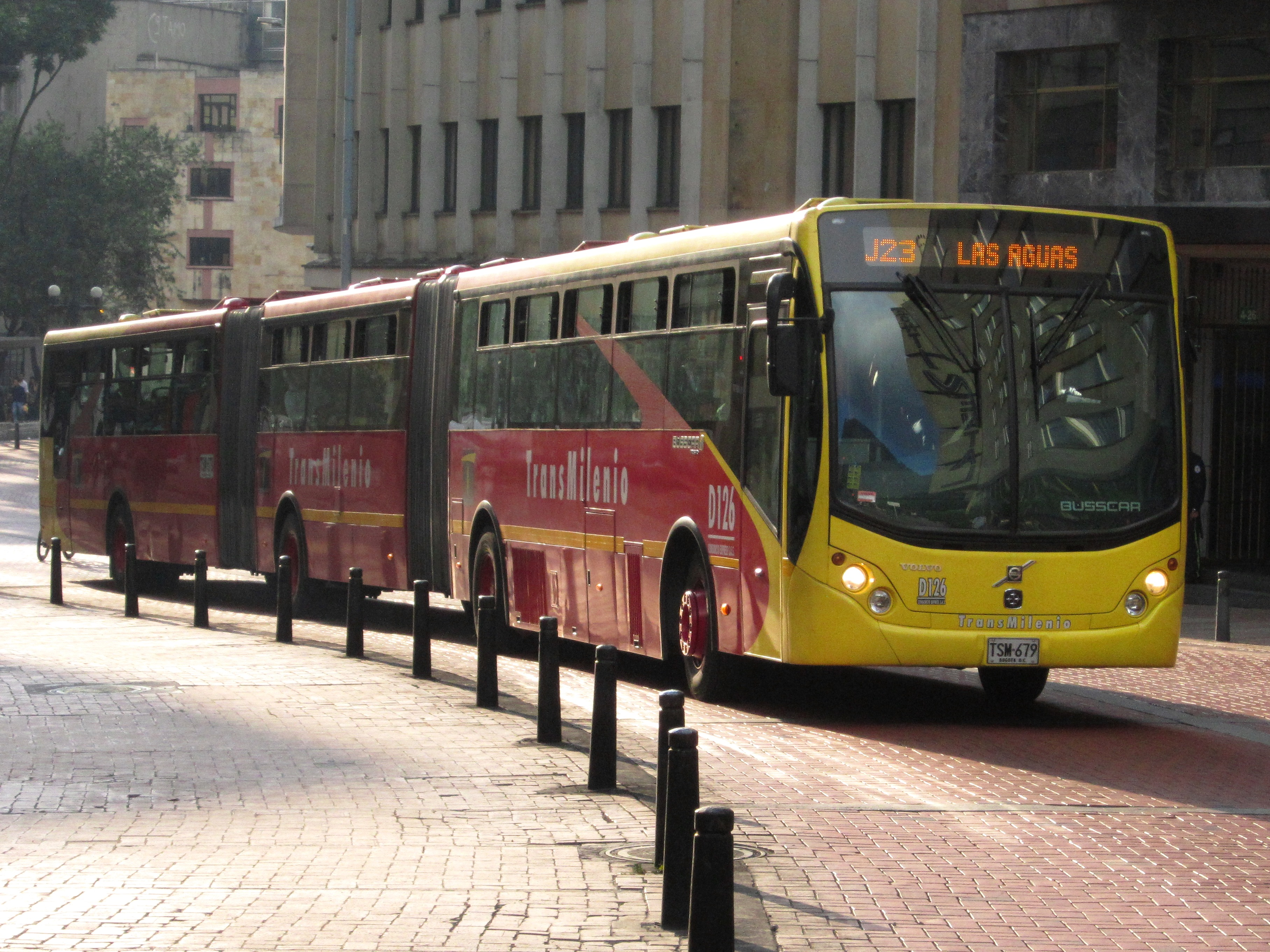
TransMilenio Urbanuss Pluss II Biarticulado bodied Volvo B12M

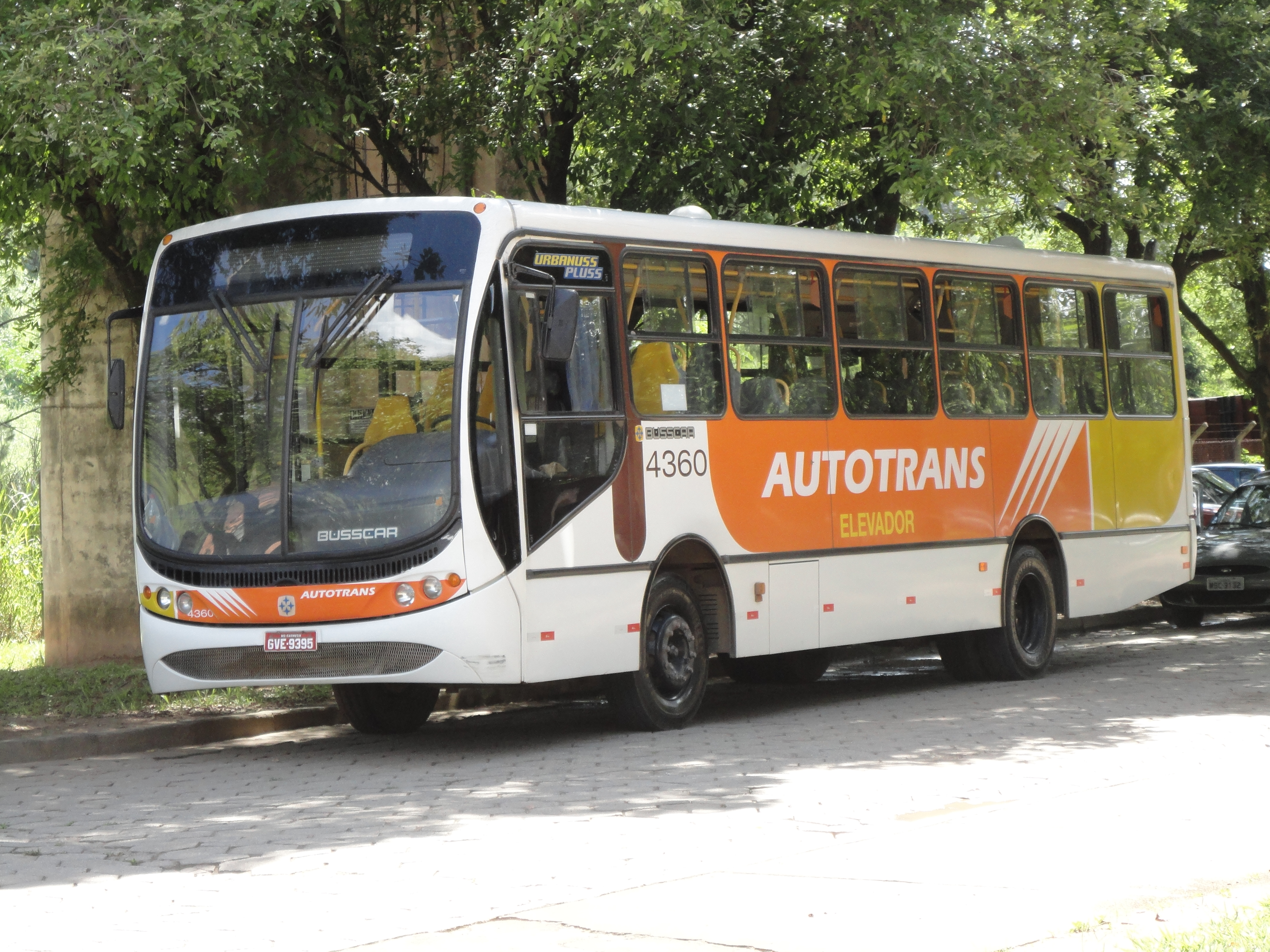
Autotrans Urbanuss Pluss bodied Mercedes Benz OF-1722M

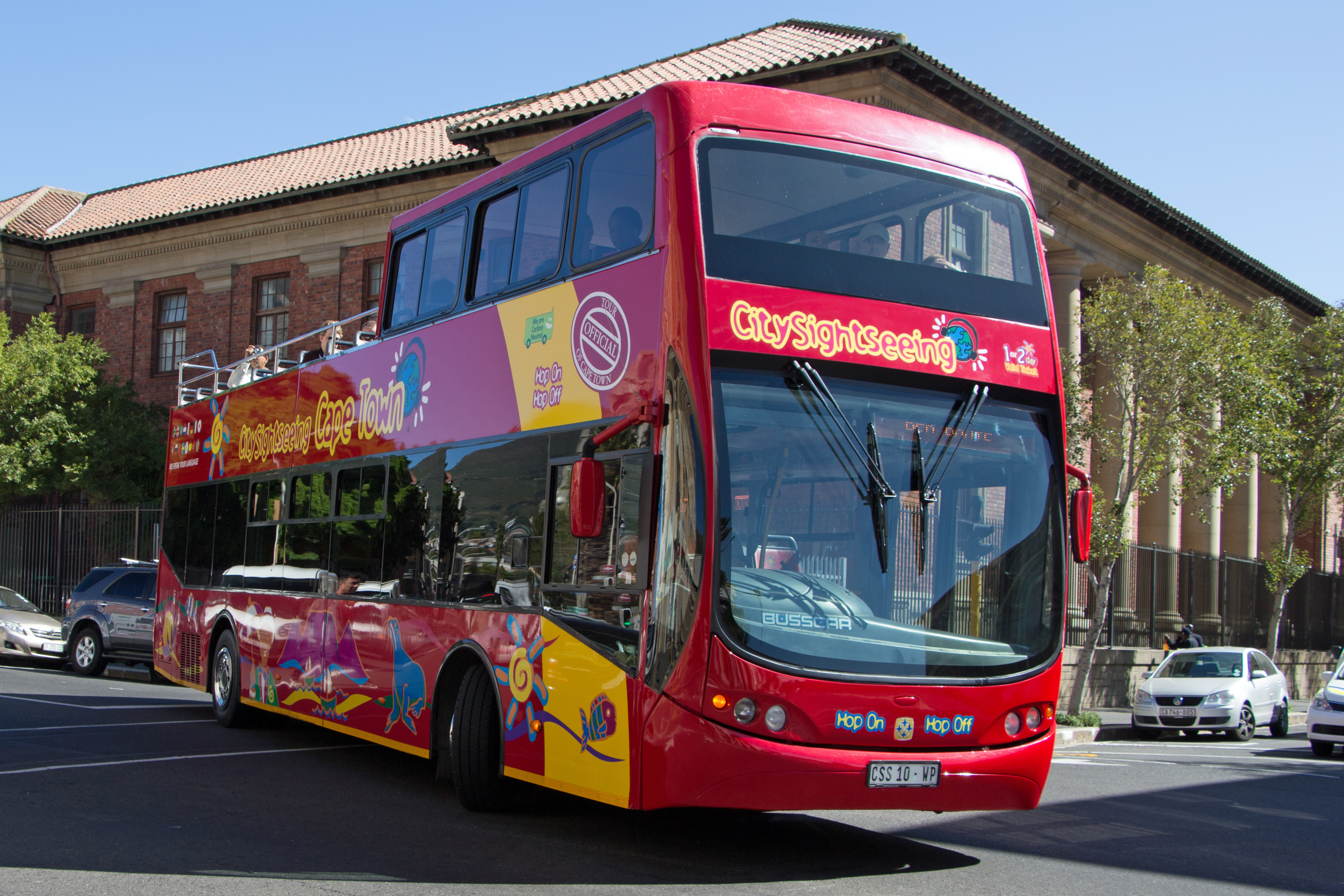
City Sightseeing Pluss Tour bodied Volvo B7TL

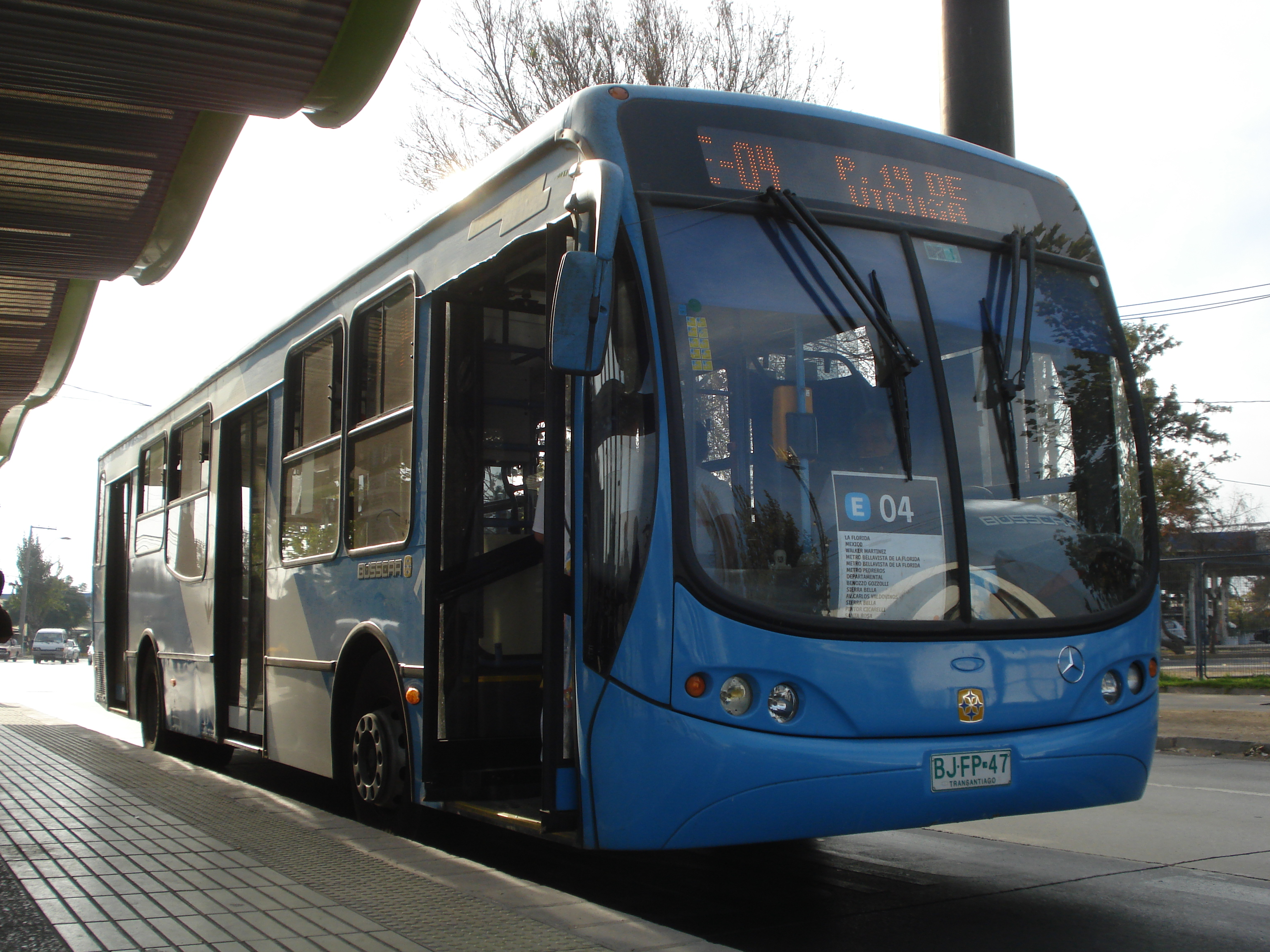
Transantiago Urbanuss Pluss in Santiago

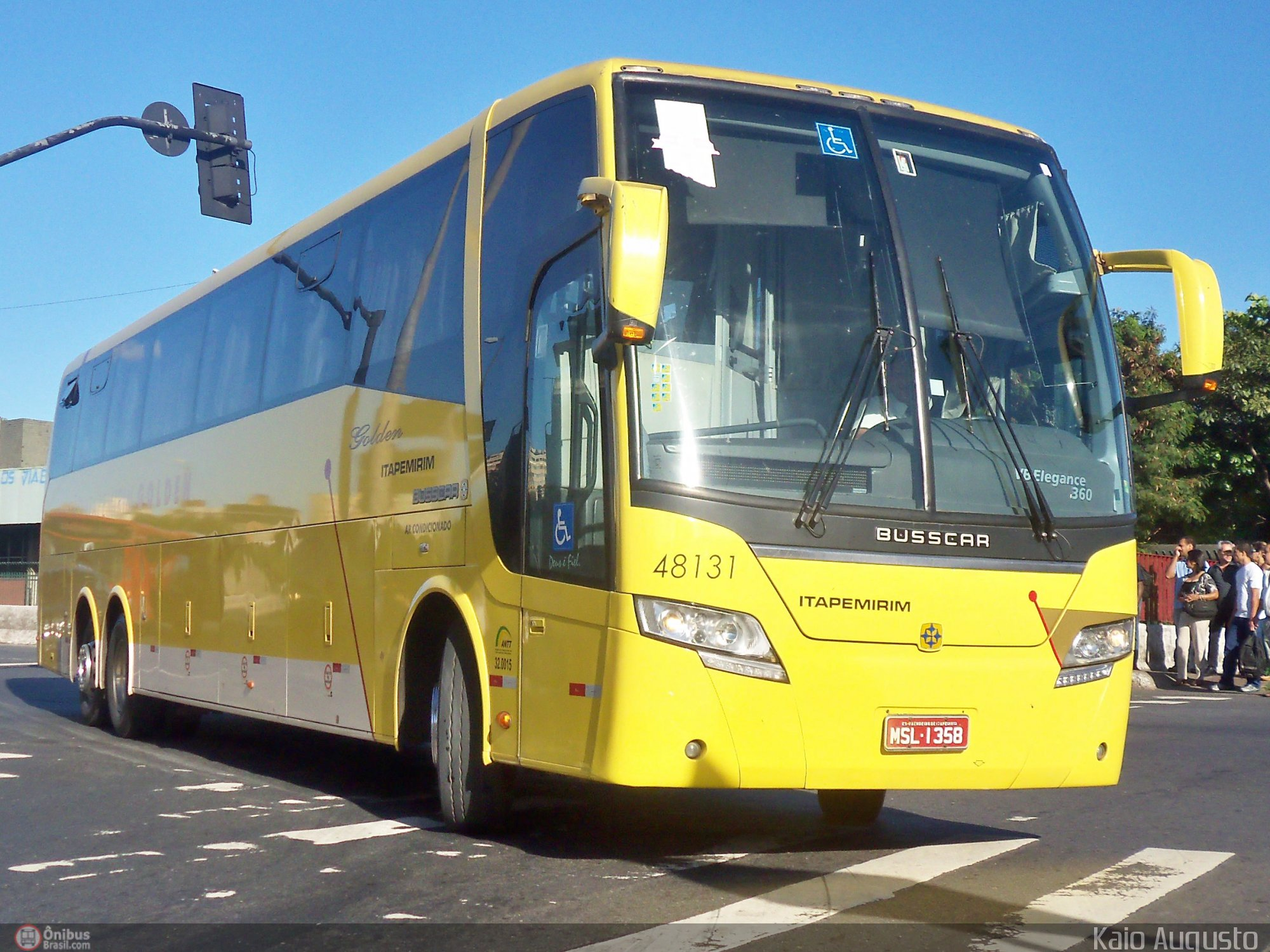
Itapemirim Elegance 360 bodied Volvo B12R

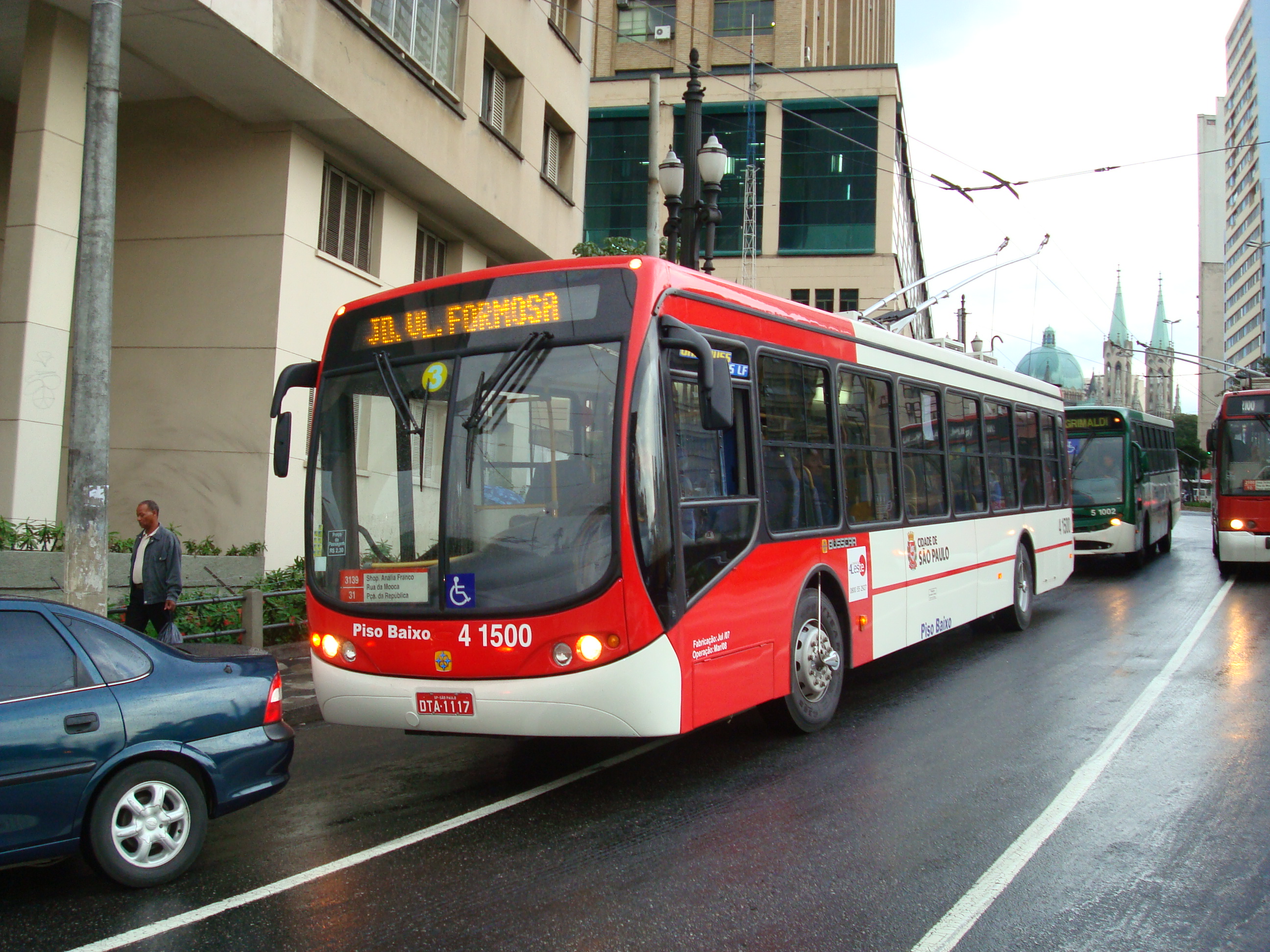
Urbanuss Pluss trolleybus in operation on the São Paulo trolleybus system

Busscar had its origins in a firm created on 17 September 1946, when two brothers of Swedish descent, Augusto Bruno Nielson and Eugênio Nielson, opened a carpentry shop in Joinville where they made wooden furniture, window frames, and desks. One year later, Nielson & Brother remodelled their first bus body. In 1949, they built a bus body entirely in wood, attached to a large Chevrolet chassis; this was the starting point of a business that would become an important bus manufacturing company in Latin America.

When Augusto's elder son Harold joined the company in 1956, it was en route to becoming the segment leader in Brazil, with innovative and successful models such as the Diplomata model in 1961, the Urbanuss in 1987, the Panorâmico DD in 1998, and others.

In 1990, the business, by then called Carrocerias Nielson, launched a new family of vehicles and changed its name to Busscar Ônibus, creating a brand that is still known internationally today despite the company's later demise.

=== Bankruptcy and successor ===
On 27 September 2012, the Brazilian judiciary of Santa Catarina declared the bankruptcy of Busscar due the 2008 financial crisis. The judge of the 5th Civil Court of Joinville, Walter Santin Júnior, approved the purchase of the Joinville factory in a final ruling on 21 March 2017, consisting of a R$9.4 million cash deposit and another R$57.74 million to be paid in 52 installments with monetary correction.

The name and activities of the new company were unknown, but in May 2017, new employment contracts became available after the end of the legal process. On 12 June 2017, Maurício Lourenço da Cunha, represented by Sergio Souza, assumed ownership of the factories, with the new company being named Carbuss.

== Former models ==
=== Transit buses ===
- Busscar Urbanuss
- Busscar Urbanuss Ecoss II
- Busscar Urbanuss Pluss
- Pluss Híbrido
- Pluss Low Floor
- Pluss Troley
- Pluss Tour
- Articulado Low Floor
- Nielson Urbanus
- Busscar Urbanus I
- Busscar Urbanus II
- Busscar Urbanus II SS

=== Coaches ===
- Panorâmico DD
- Jum Buss 400
- Jum Buss 380
- Jum Buss 360
- Vissta Buss Elegance 360
- Vissta Buss Elegance 380
- Vissta Buss HI
- Vissta Buss LO
- El Buss 340
- El Buss 320
- Interbuss
- Nielson Diplomata 2.40
- Nielson Diplomata 2.50
- Nielson Diplomata 2.60
- Nielson Diplomata 310
- Nielson Diplomata 330
- Nielson Diplomata 350
- Nielson Diplomata 380
- El Buss 320 I
- El Buss 340 I
- El Buss 360 I
- Jum Buss 340 I
- Jum Buss 360 I
- Jum Buss 380 I
- Jum Buss 340T I
- Jum Buss 360T I
- Jum Buss 380T I
- El Buss 320 II
- El Buss 340 II (Philippines and South American Markets (Except Latin America))
- Jum Buss 360 II
- Jum Buss 380 II
- Jum Buss 400 Panorâmico
- Interbus
- Vissta Buss
- Vissta Buss 320/360 (4x2 Version; Philippines and Brazil only)
