= Empresa Metropolitana de Transportes Urbanos de São Paulo =

Empresa Metropolitana de Transportes Urbanos

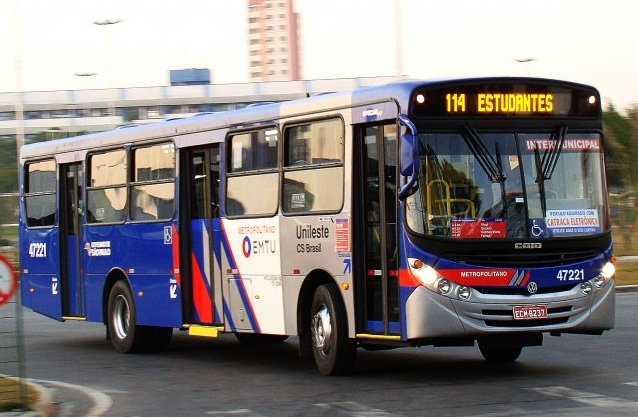
- Parent: Secretaria dos Transportes Metropolitanos
- Founded: 13 December 1977; 48 years ago
- Defunct: 20 March 2025; 16 months ago
- Locale: State of São Paulo, Brazil
- Service area: Metropolitan regions of São Paulo, Campinas and Baixada Santista
- Service type: bus service
- Routes: 931
- Fleet: 4,500 vehicles
- Operator: DCU

The Empresa Metropolitana de Transportes Urbanos de São Paulo, or EMTU, was a company owned by the Secretaria de Estado dos Transportes Metropolitanos (STM) (English: State Secretariat for Metropolitan Transports). Created on 13 December 1977, it was responsible for the transport, by bus, of 5 million people in the Greater São Paulo área. It was liquidated by decret of governor Tarcísio de Freitas on 20 March 2025.

== See also ==
- São Paulo Metro
- Companhia Paulista de Trens Metropolitanos - São Paulo's Metropolitan Train Company
- SPTrans - São Paulo Transport
- Trolleybuses in São Paulo
