= Trolleybuses in São Paulo =

Transit system in São Paulo, Brazil

Coordinates: 23°33′S 46°38′W

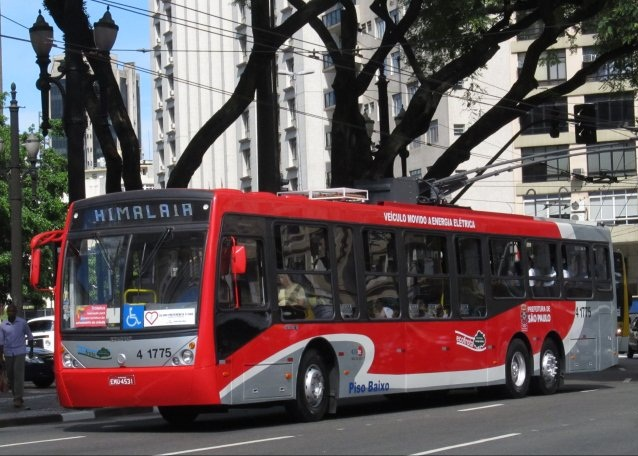
- A 2011-built CAIO/Scania AB three-axle trolleybus of the SPTrans system

Operation
- Locale: São Paulo, São Paulo, Brazil
- Open: SPTrans (ex-CMTC) system: 1949; EMTU system: 1988
- Routes: SPTrans: 12; EMTU: 10
- Owners: SPTrans, EMTU
- Operators: SPTrans system: Ambiental Transportes Urbanos S.A. (concessionaire, since 2011); EMTU system: Metra (concessionaire, since 1997)

Infrastructure
- Electrification: 615 VDC
- Stock: SPT: 199; EMTU/Metra: 79

Trolleybuses in São Paulo provide a portion of the public transport service in Greater São Paulo, in the state of São Paulo, Brazil, with two independent trolleybus systems. The SPTrans (São Paulo Transportes) system opened in 1949 and serves the city of São Paulo, while the Empresa Metropolitana de Transportes Urbanos de São Paulo (EMTU) system opened in 1988 and serves suburban areas to the southeast of the city proper. Worldwide, São Paulo is the only metropolitan area possessing two independent trolleybus systems.

== History ==
The urban network now owned by SPTrans opened on 22 April 1949, the first trolleybus system to open in Brazil. The municipally owned system was operated by the Companhia Municipal de Transportes Coletivos (Municipal Public Transport Authority) (CMTC) until 1994, when it was semi-privatized, with a new municipal authority, SPTrans, maintaining public ownership of the system but with operation contracted out to private companies through a competitive bidding. At the start of privately run operation, there were three different concessionaires for different parts of the SPTrans, ex-CMTC trolleybus network. The SPTrans network was much larger at that time.

The SPTrans system comprises 12 lines (two of them currently suspended) and is operated with 199 trolleybuses by a concessionaire, Ambiental Transportes Urbanos. SPTrans owns and maintains the infrastructure, such as overhead wires, substations, passenger terminals and depots/garages. Ambiental is responsible for purchasing new vehicles, but ownership of vehicles passes to SPTrans eight years from time of purchase. Ambiental was awarded the concession to operate the service in SPTrans Zone 4 (also known as the Eastern Zone), both trolleybus and motorbus, in 2011, after the purchase of Himalaia Transportes.

The EMTU trolleybus system opened on 3 December 1988, (sometimes given as 19 November 1988, when free public service began operating). It currently has six lines, serving the São Mateus–Jabaquara Metropolitan Corridor, which links São Paulo with the ABC Region cities of Diadema, São Bernardo do Campo, Santo Andre and Mauá in Greater São Paulo. These lines are also operated by a concessionaire, Metra, under the supervision of EMTU. Metra was awarded the contract in 1997.

== SPTrans lines ==
Line	Route
2002/10	Terminal Parque Dom Pedro II – Terminal Bandeira – Terminal Parque Dom Pedro II (circular)
2100/10	Terminal Vila Carrão – Praça da Sé – Terminal Vila Carrão (circular)
2100/21	Terminal Vila Carrão – Terminal Parque Dom Pedro II (only on Sundays)
2290/10	Terminal São Mateus – Terminal Parque Dom Pedro II
3139/31	Jardim Vila Formosa – Praça Clóvis Bevilacqua – Jardim Vila Formosa (circular)
3160/10	Terminal Vila Prudente – Terminal Parque Dom Pedro II
342M/10	Terminal São Mateus – Terminal Penha
408A/10	Machado de Assis – Cardoso de Almeida – Machado de Assis (circular)
4112/10	Santa Margarida Maria – Praça da República – Santa Margarida Maria (circular)
4113/10	Gentil de Moura – Praça da República – Gentil de Moura (circular)
2101/10	Praça Sílvio Romero – Praça da Sé
2101/41	Praça Sílvio Romero – Terminal Vila Prudente

The last two of these lines are the ones currently suspended; they are presently being operated by diesel powered buses.

The 2002/10 line is presently being operated by electric chargers powered buses.

== SPTrans current fleet ==
As at 2014, the SPTrans trolleybus fleet was as follows:

Fleet numbers	Quantity	Manufacturer (overall and body)	Chassis manufacturer	Electrical equipment	Model No.	Configuration	Low-floor or high-floor	Year built
4 1500, 4 1764 – 4 1773	11	Busscar	Busscar	WEG	Urbanuss Pluss	Conventional	LF	2007–2009
4 1501 – 4 1590, 4 1592 – 4 1600	99	CAIO Induscar LTDA.	Scania	WEG/Eletra	Millennium BRT	Three-axle rigid (15 meters)	LF	2012–2013
4 1774, 4 1776 – 4 1837, 4 1902 – 4 1917	77	CAIO Induscar LTDA.	Mercedes-Benz	WEG/Eletra	Millennium	Conventional	LF	2011–2012
4 1775	1	CAIO Induscar LTDA.	Scania	WEG/Eletra	Millennium	Three-axle rigid (15 meters)	LF	2011
4 1901	1	IBRAVA LTDA.	Tuttotrasporti	WEG	Trólebus	Conventional	LF	2009
4 1601 – 4 1610	10	CAIO Induscar LTDA.	MAN	WEG/Eletra	Millennium BRT	Conventional	LF	2013

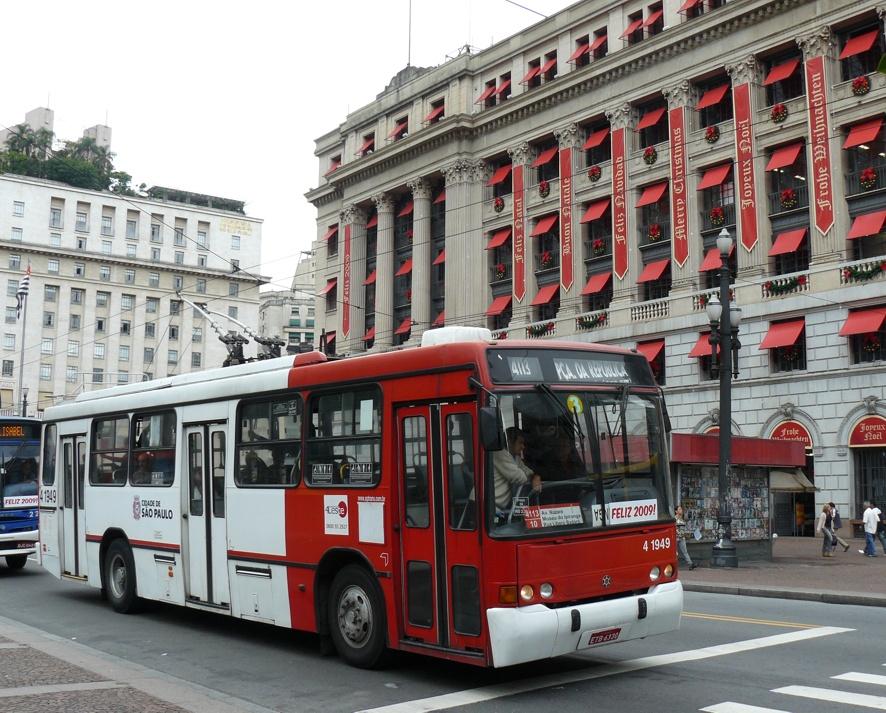
The last high-floor trolleybuses on the SPTrans system were retired in September 2013. The last such vehicles in service were Marcopolo/Volvo trolleybuses built in the 1990s.

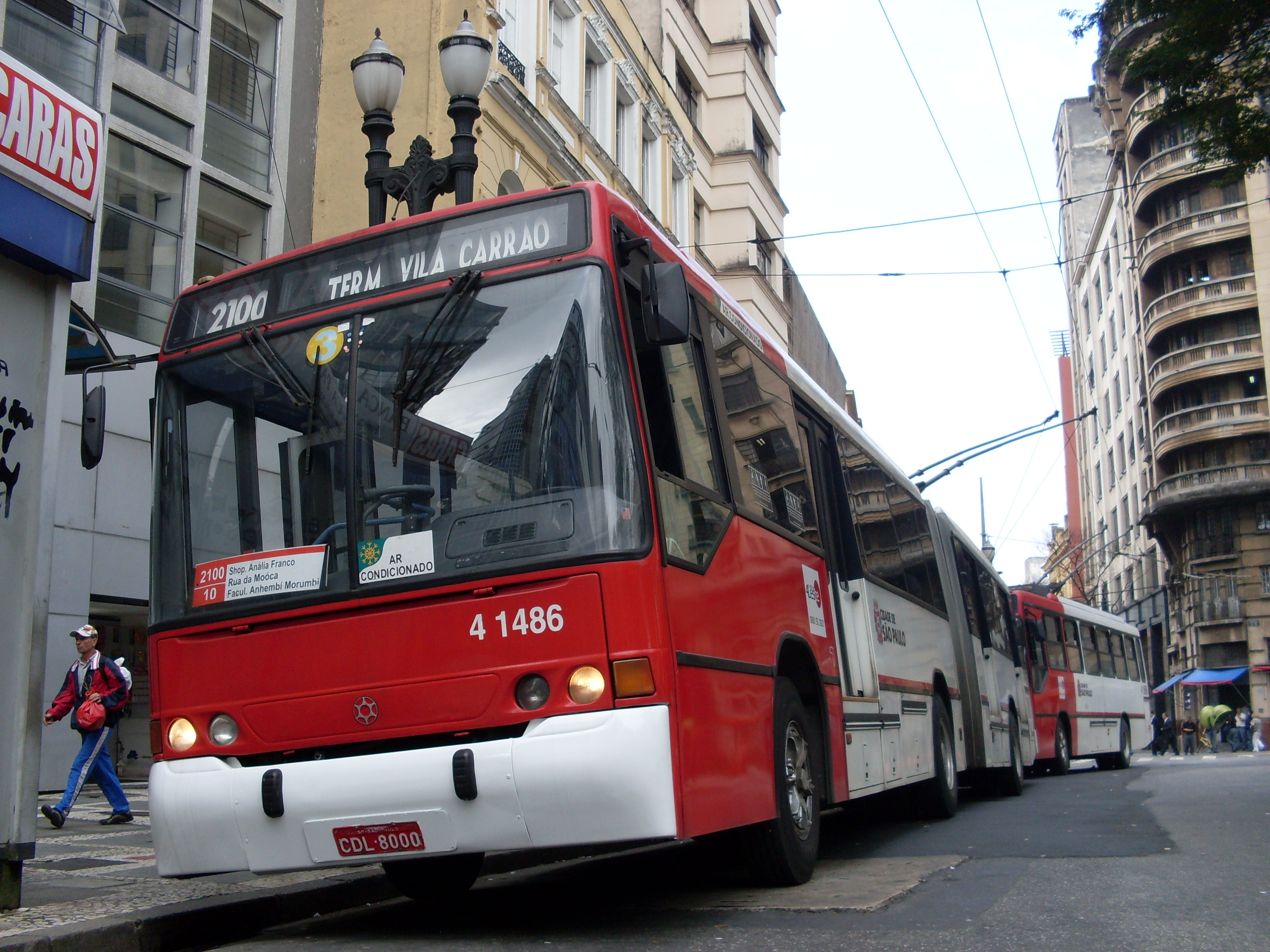
SPTrans Marcopolo/Volvo articulated trolleybus No. 1486. It originated in 1985 as a CAIO/Volvo trolleybus (No. 8000) but was rebodied in 1997 by Marcopolo. It has since been retired.

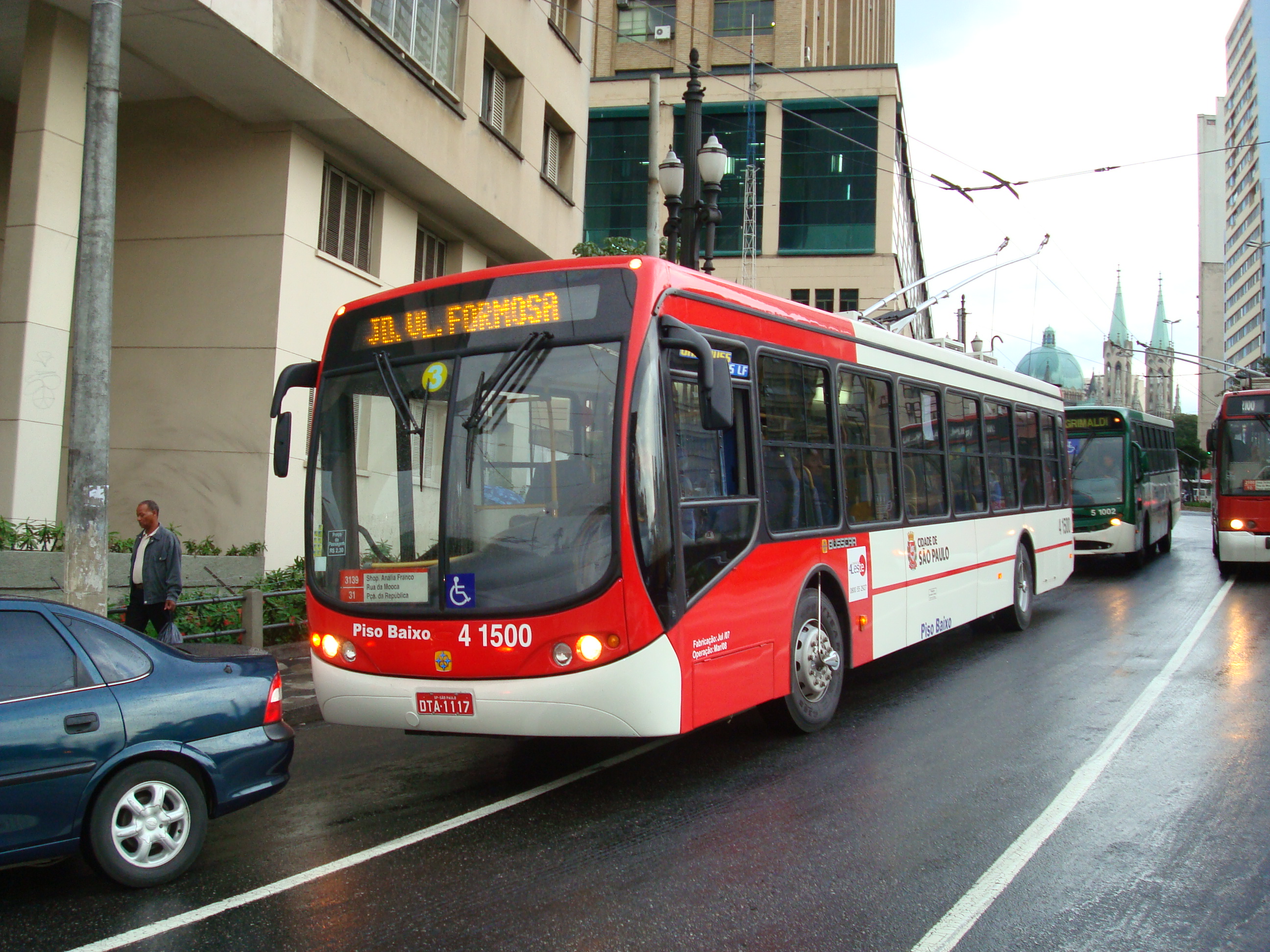
Busscar trolleybus, built in 2007, seen at Av. Rangel Pestana, near Parque Dom Pedro II. It is a low-floor model.

== EMTU lines ==
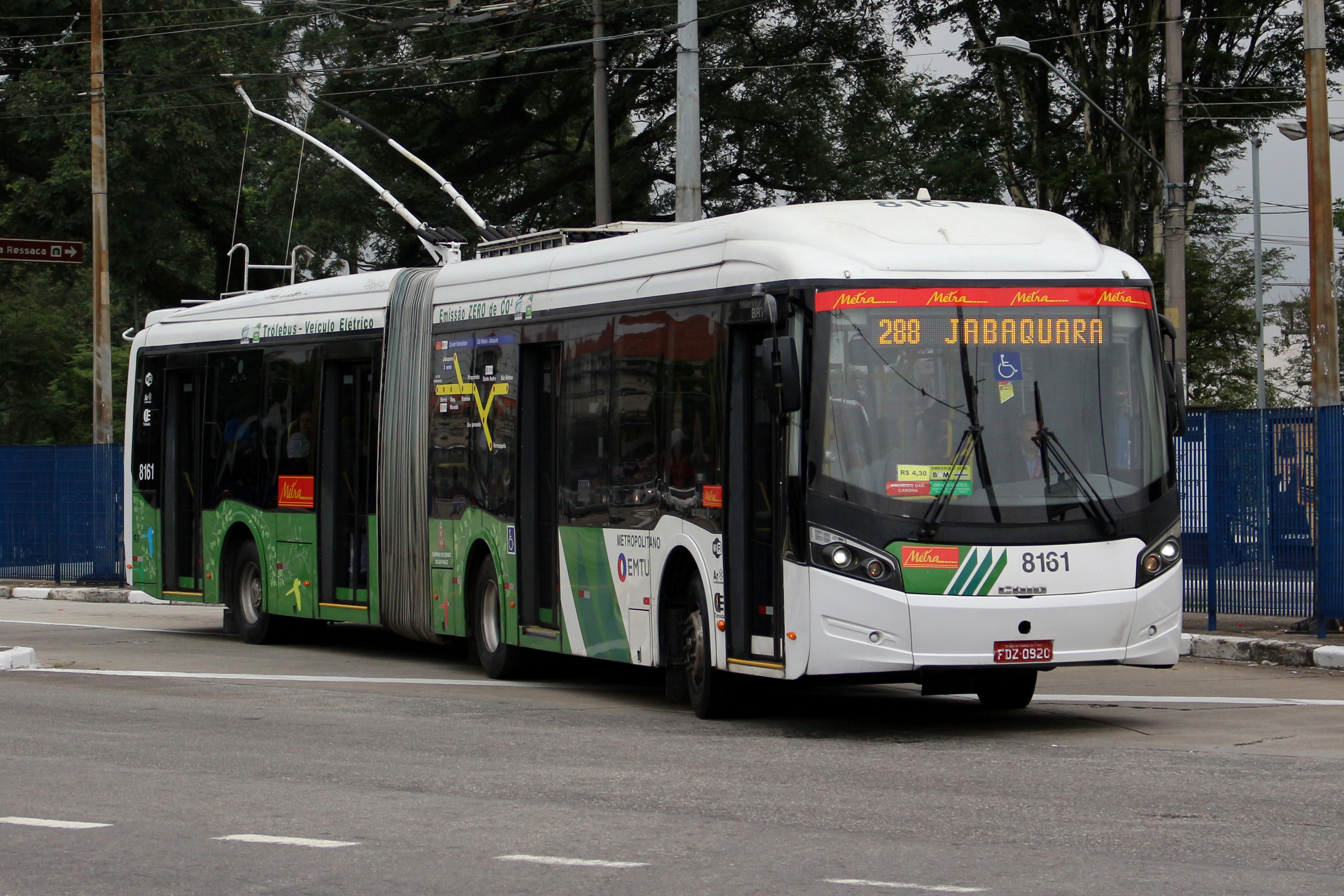
A CAIO trolleybus on route 288 in 2017

Line	Route
284	Terminal São Mateus – Terminal Santo André Oeste
284M	Terminal São Mateus – Shopping Metrópole
285	Terminal São Mateus – Terminal Ferrazópolis
286	Terminal Santo André Leste – Terminal Ferrazópolis
287P	Terminal Santo André Leste – Terminal Piraporinha
288	Terminal Ferrazópolis – Terminal Jabaquara
288P	Terminal Ferrazópolis – Terminal Piraporinha
289	Terminal Piraporinha – Terminal Jabaquara
290	Terminal Diadema – Terminal Jabaquara
487	Terminal Sônia Maria – Shopping ABC

Service on all lines is operated with a mix of trolleybuses and diesel buses.

== EMTU current fleet ==
As at 2014, the EMTU trolleybus fleet was as follows:

Fleet numbers	Quantity	Manufacturer (overall and body)	Chassis manufacturer	Electrical equipment	Model No.	Configuration	Low-floor or high-floor	Year built
5500	1	CAIO Induscar Ltda.	Scania	WEG / Eletra	Millennium	Three-axle rigid (15 meters)	LF	2011
7047 – 7068	22	Marcopolo S.A.	Volvo	GEVISA / Powertronics	Torino 1983	Conventional	HF	1987–1988
7201	1	Busscar	HVR	Engesa / Eletra	Urbanuss Pluss	Conventional	LF	2001
7202 – 7221	20	Busscar	HVR	Engesa / Eletra	Urbanuss Pluss	Conventional	LF	2002–2005
7301	1	Busscar	Mercedes-Benz	Engesa / Eletra	Urbanuss Pluss	Conventional	LF	2001
7400 – 7402	3	CAIO Induscar Ltda.	Mercedes-Benz	WEG / Eletra	Millennium	Conventional	LF	2008–2010
8101 – 8110	10	Marcopolo	Volvo	Toshiba / Powertronics	Torino GV	Articulated	HF	1998
8150 – 8155	2	Busscar	Volvo	WEG / Eletra	Urbanuss Pluss	Articulated	HF	2001 as diesel bus; converted 2011–2012
8161 – 8180	20	CAIO Induscar Ltda.	Mercedes-Benz	WEG/Eletra	Millennium BRT	Articulated	LF	2013

== See also ==
- List of trolleybus systems in Brazil
- Transport in São Paulo
