= Volkswagen Passat =

Car model series

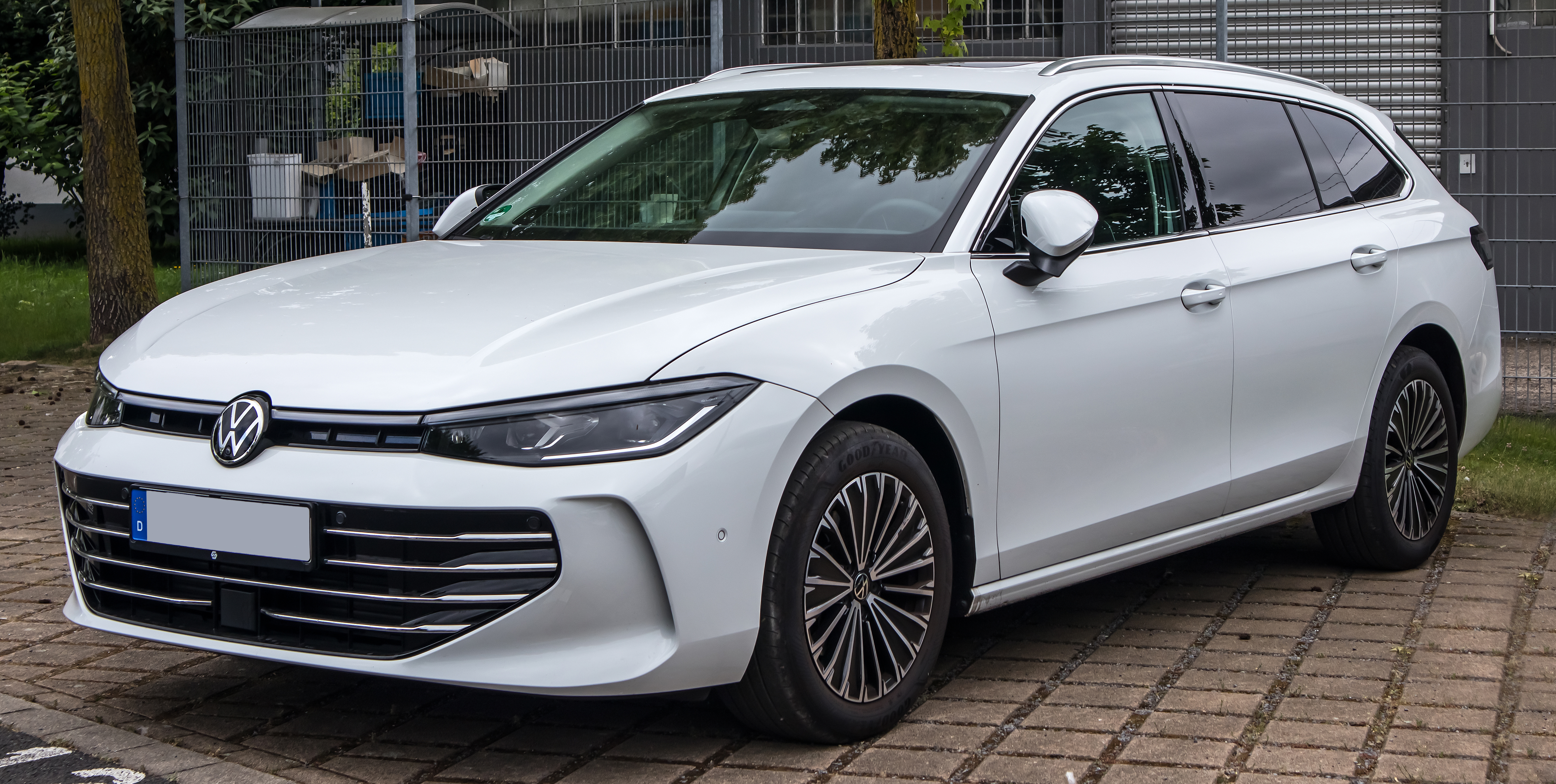
- Passat B9

Overview
- Manufacturer: Volkswagen
- Also called: Volkswagen Dasher; Volkswagen Quantum; Volkswagen Santana; Volkswagen Corsar; Volkswagen Magotan (China); Volkswagen Carat
- Production: 1973–present

Body and chassis
- Class: Mid-size car / large family car (D)
- Layout: Front-engine, front-wheel-drive or four-wheel-drive (4Motion)

Chronology
- Predecessor: Volkswagen Type 4; Volkswagen Type 3; Volkswagen K70
- Successor: Volkswagen ID.7 (saloon)

The Volkswagen Passat is a nameplate of large family cars (D-segment) manufactured and marketed by the German automobile manufacturer Volkswagen since 1973 and also marketed variously as the Dasher, Santana, Quantum, Magotan, Corsar and Carat — in saloon, estate, and hatchback body styles. With sales of 34 million units worldwide, the Passat is the fourth best-selling automobile of all time.

A "four-door coupé" variant of the Passat with a lower roof was released in the North American market in 2008 as the Passat CC, which was then renamed to Volkswagen CC. The CC was succeeded by the Arteon in 2017.

In January 2011, Volkswagen introduced a separate Passat model line, internally designated "Volkswagen New Midsize Sedan" or NMS, that was manufactured in the US at the Chattanooga assembly plant and in China at Nanjing by SAIC-Volkswagen. Developed to increase Volkswagen sales in North America, the Passat NMS is larger and costs less to produce, and is sold in North America, South Korea, China, and the Middle East. The separate B8 Passat model entered production, based on the MQB platform.

In 2019, the Passat NMS programme was split into two as the North American one continued being produced on an older platform while the Chinese Passat moved on to the MQB platform, which resulted in Volkswagen marketing three models under the Passat nameplate globally at that time. The North American Passat was discontinued after the 2022 model year.

Volkswagen ended the production of the saloon Passat for the European market in 2022. The B9 Passat, released in 2023, is only available in an estate body style. The Passat continues to be available as a saloon in China.

The "Passat" is one of several Volkswagen models named after a wind: Passat is the German word for "Trade winds".

== B1 (Type 32; 1973) ==
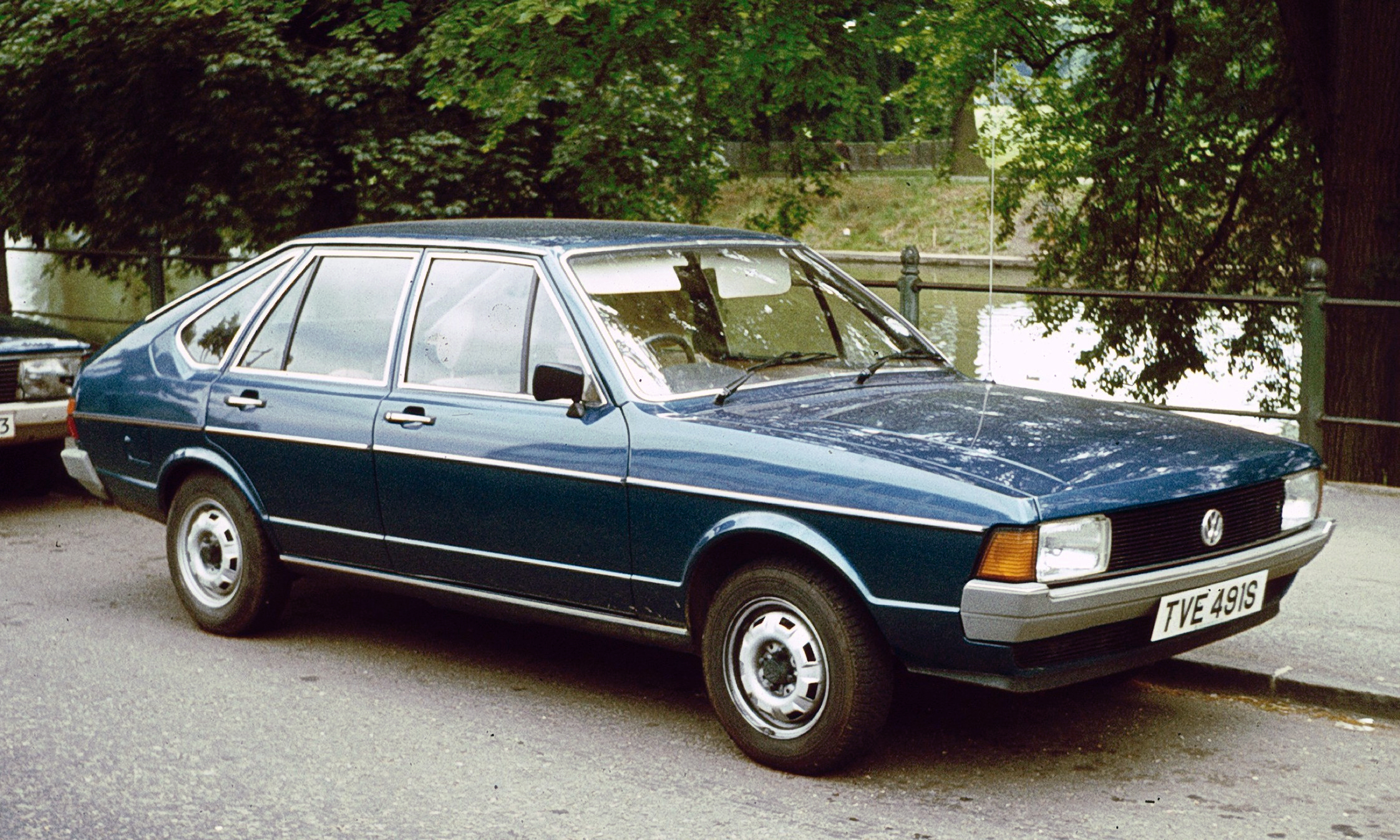
VW Passat B1 5-door (Europe)

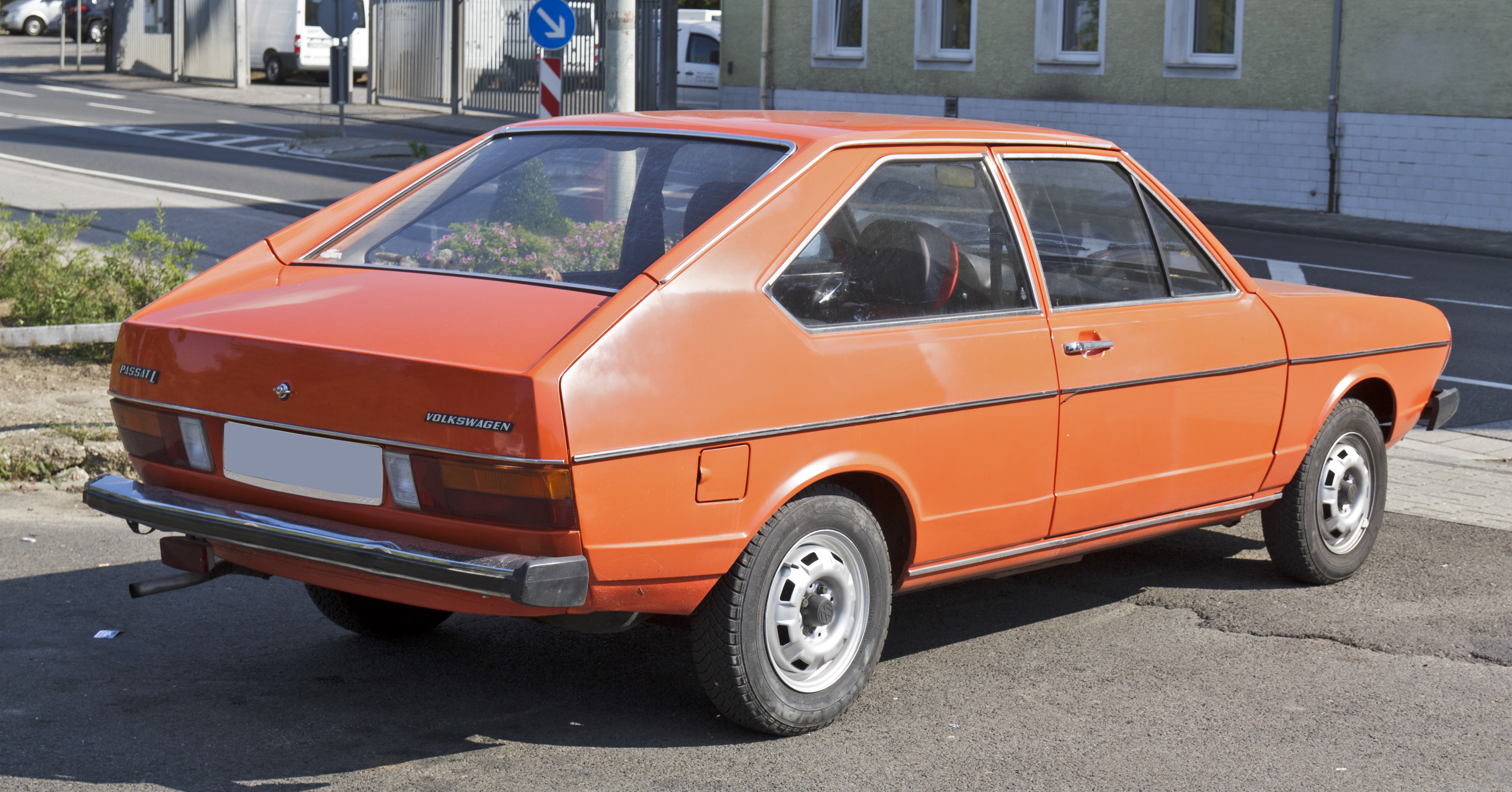
Volkswagen Passat B1 2-door (Europe)

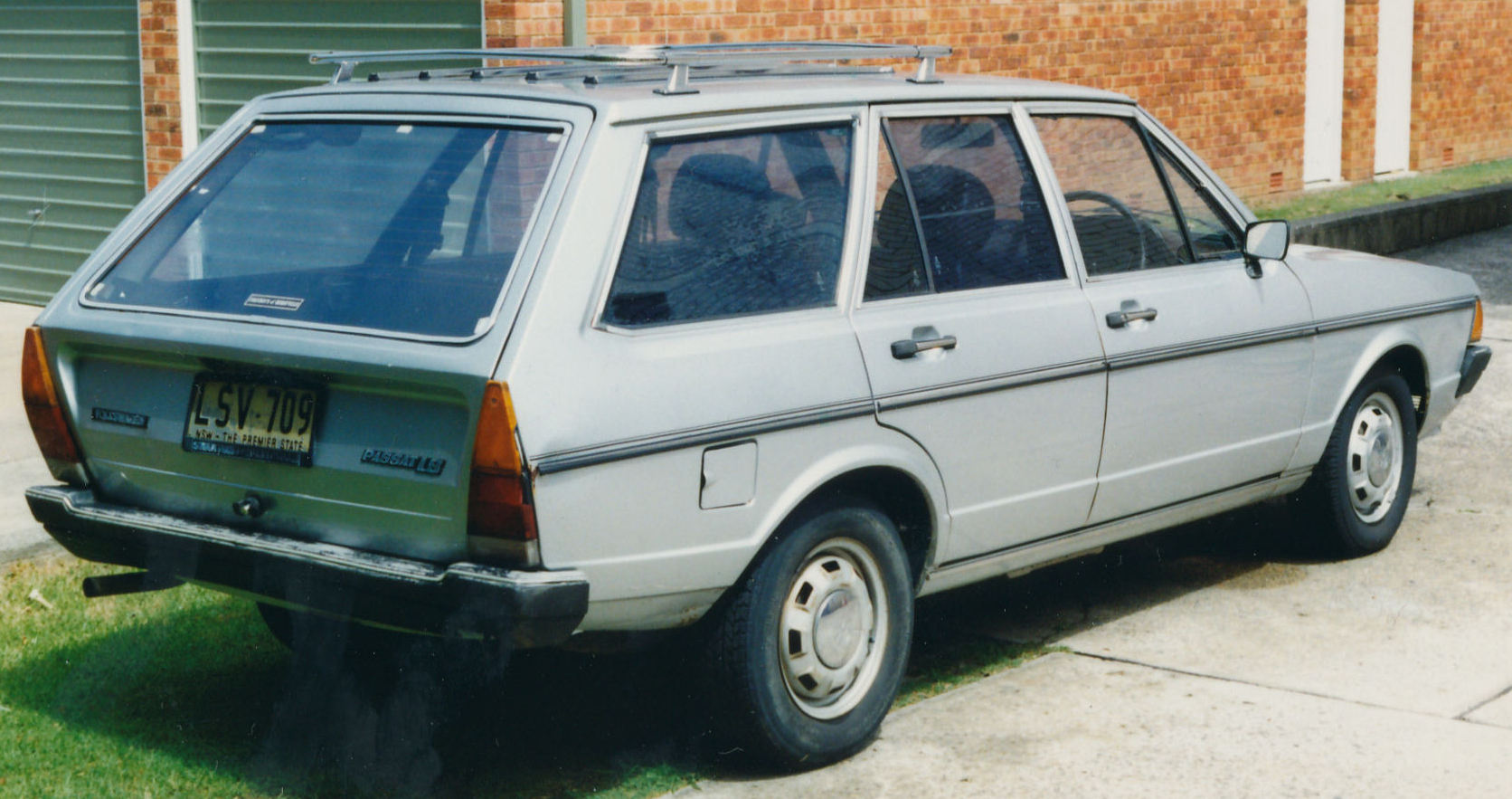
VW Passat LS Estate 1980 (Australia)

The first generation Passat launched in 1973 in two- and four-door saloon and three- and five-door versions. Externally all four shared styling by Giorgetto Giugiaro. The first generation Passat was a fastback variant of the mechanically identical Audi 80 saloon, introduced a year earlier. A five-door estate was introduced in 1974, which in North American markets was sold as an Audi Fox. In Europe, the Passat was equipped with two rectangular, two round 7-inch, or four round 5.5-inch headlamps depending on specification. The Passat was one of the most modern European family cars at the time, and was intended as a replacement for the ageing Volkswagen Type 3 and Type 4. The only other European cars of its size to feature front-wheel drive and a hatchback were the Renault 16 and Austin Maxi.

The Passat originally featured the four-cylinder OHC 1.3-litre (55 PS (40 kW; 54 hp)) and 1.5-litre (75 PS (55 kW; 74 hp)/85 PS (63 kW; 84 hp)) petrol engines also used in the Audi 80—longitudinally mounted with front-wheel drive, in Audi tradition, with either a four-speed manual transmission or three-speed automatic. It had a MacPherson strut front suspension with a solid axle/coil spring setup at the rear.

The SOHC 1.5-litre was enlarged to 1.6-litre in August 1975 with unchanged power ratings and slightly higher torque ratings. In July 1978, the Passat Diesel became available, equipped with the VW Golf's 1.5-litre diesel (50 PS (37 kW; 49 hp)), followed in February 1979 by the Passat GLI with a fuel-injected version of the 1.6-litre engine.

The range received a facelift in 1977 (launched 1978 outside Europe) with revised interior and revised exterior with repositioned indicators and depending on model, either four round or two rectangular headlamps.

In North America, the car was marketed as the Volkswagen Dasher. The three-door hatchback, four-door saloon, and an estate model launched in North America for and during the 1974 model year. The sole available engine was a carburetted 1.5-litre inline-four developing 75 hp (56 kW) (or 70 hp (52 kW) in 1975), supplanted from model year 1976 by a Bosch fuel-injected 1.6-litre four 78 hp (58 kW). North American cars were equipped with single DOT standard headlamps.

In 1978, the Dasher received a facelift along the lines of the European Passat, with quad sealed beam headlamps and big polyurethane covered bumpers. The trim was also upgraded and the ride softened. 1979 saw the introduction of the 1.5-litre diesel engine, which produced just 48 PS (35 kW) in the 1,130 kg (2,490 lb) car. 0–100 km/h time for the Diesel was 19.4 seconds, 6.2 seconds slower than the petrol engine. All petrol engines were dropped for North America in 1981, in preparation for the next generation.

In Brazil, the Passat B1 was produced from June 1974 until 1988. Since the Audi 80 was not marketed in Brazil, the Passat received the Audi's different front-end treatment after a facelift for 1979. Originally with a 1.5-litre engine, during its long life cycle many improvements from the B2 platform were later introduced, like its 1.6 and 1.8-litre engines, a Brazil-specific facelift in 1985, and a five-speed gearbox. A sports version, named Passat TS 1.6 and later Passat GTS 1.8 Pointer was also introduced.

== B2 (Type 32B; 1981) ==
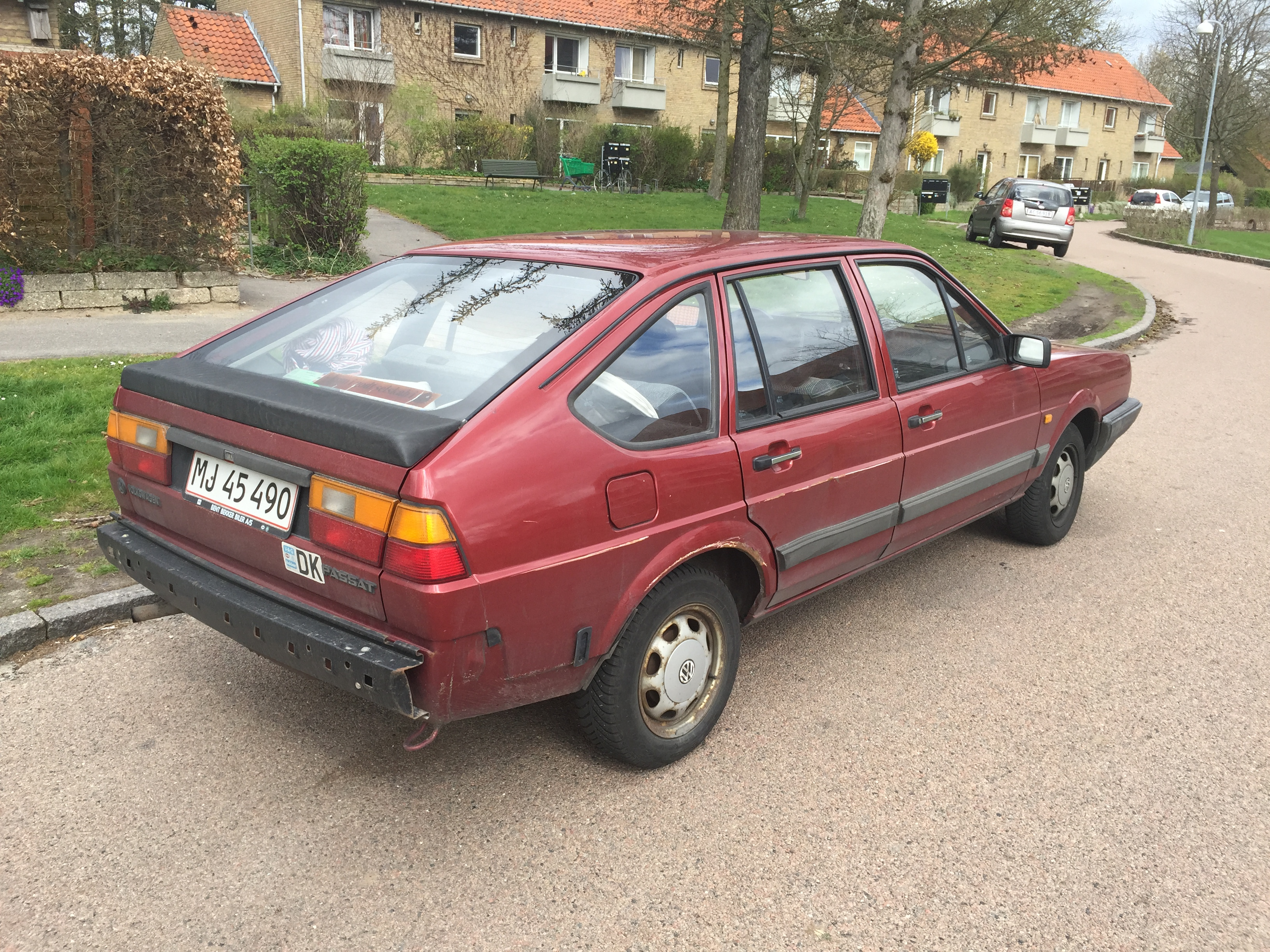
Volkswagen Passat B2 hatchback (Europe)

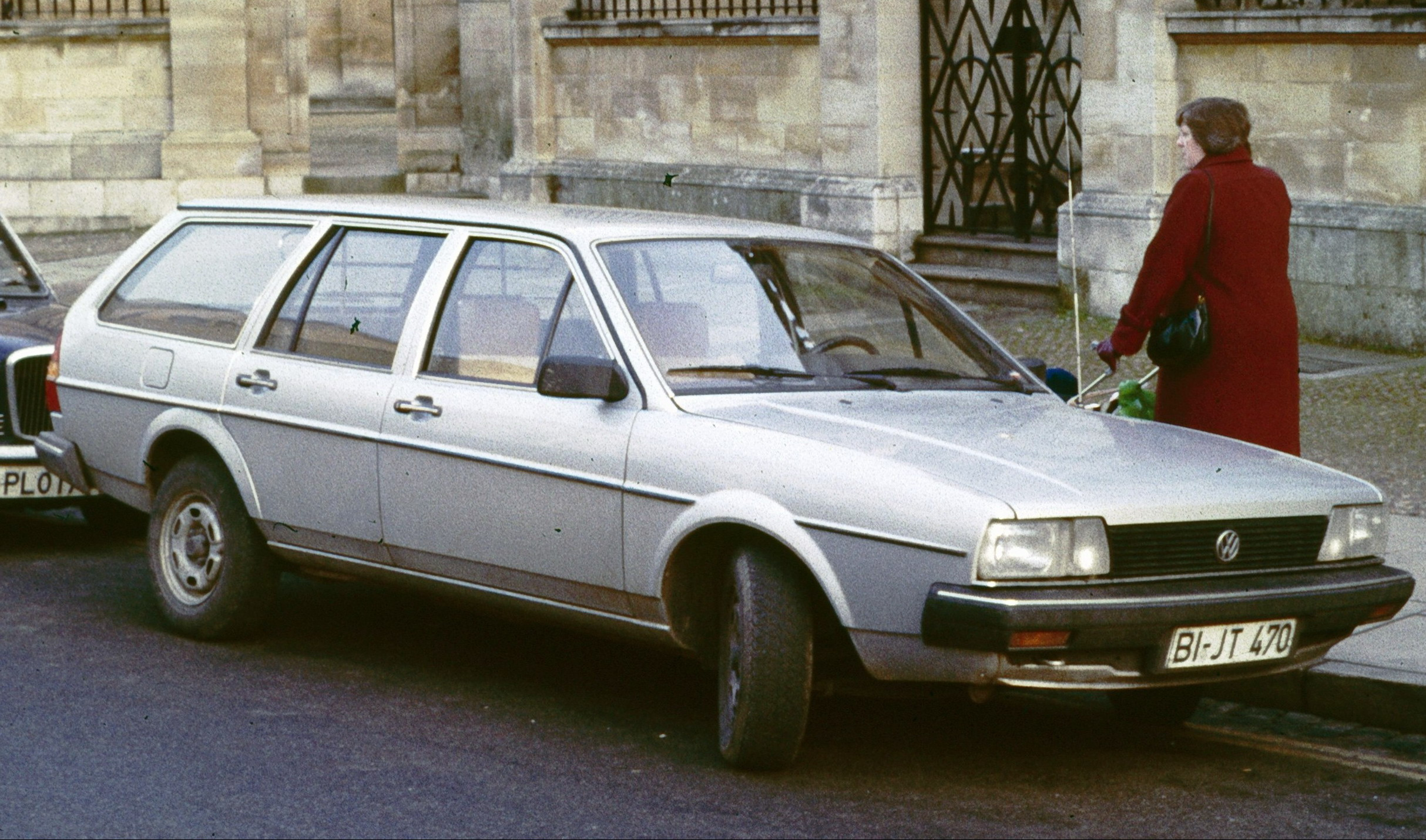
Volkswagen Passat B2 estate (Europe)

The second generation Passat launched in November 1980. The platform, named B2, was once again based on the corresponding version of the Audi 80, which had been launched in 1978. The B2 Passat was slightly longer.

In addition to the Passat hatchbacks and Variants (estate), there was also a conventional three-box saloon, which until the 1985 facelift was sold as the Volkswagen Santana in Europe. In the United States, the Passat/Santana was sold as the Volkswagen Quantum, available in three-door hatchback, four-door saloon, and an estate model, but the five-door hatchback was never sold there and the three-door hatchback was dropped after less than two years. The four-wheel drive Syncro estate version was introduced in October 1984, initially only with the more powerful five-cylinder engine.

The Passat/Santana was also produced and commercialised in China, Mexico, South America and South Africa. In Mexico, it was marketed from 1984 to 1988 as the VW Corsar and Corsar Variant (the 4-door saloon and 5-door estate, respectively). In Argentina, from 1987 to 1991 as the VW Carat. In Brazil, the estate model was badged VW Quantum. The Passat saloon and estate were produced in South Africa for the local market until 1987.

Like the previous generation, the B2 Passat was mainly sold with four-cylinder petrol and diesel engines. Unlike its predecessor, the top-of the line versions received five-cylinder Audi or VW engines of 1.9–2.2 litres. In addition to four- and five-speed manuals and three-speed automatic gearboxes, the Passat/Santana was also available with the 4+E transmission. This, also called the "Formel E" had a particularly long top gear, which combined with a freewheeling mechanism, provided better fuel economy. An automatic stop/start was also available in some markets. The four-wheel-drive system used in the Passat Variant Syncro shared the mechanics of the Audi 80 and not the Volkswagen Golf Syncro. The Syncro's bottom plate was almost entirely different, requiring a transmission tunnel, a relocated fuel tank and no spare tyre well (to make room for the complex rear axle assembly). Only the more popular estate was re-engineered.

In 1985, the range received a slight facelift, consisting of new, larger bumpers, interior retouches, a new front grille and new taillights on the hatchback versions. The three-door hatchback was discontinued, while the Santana nameplate was dropped in Europe. The saloon's front end was now the same as the hatchback and estate.

On 31 March 1988, production ended (although Syncro models continued in production until June) with 3,345,248 built in Germany. World production totalled approximately 4.5 million units.

== B3 and B4 (Typ 35i; 1988) ==
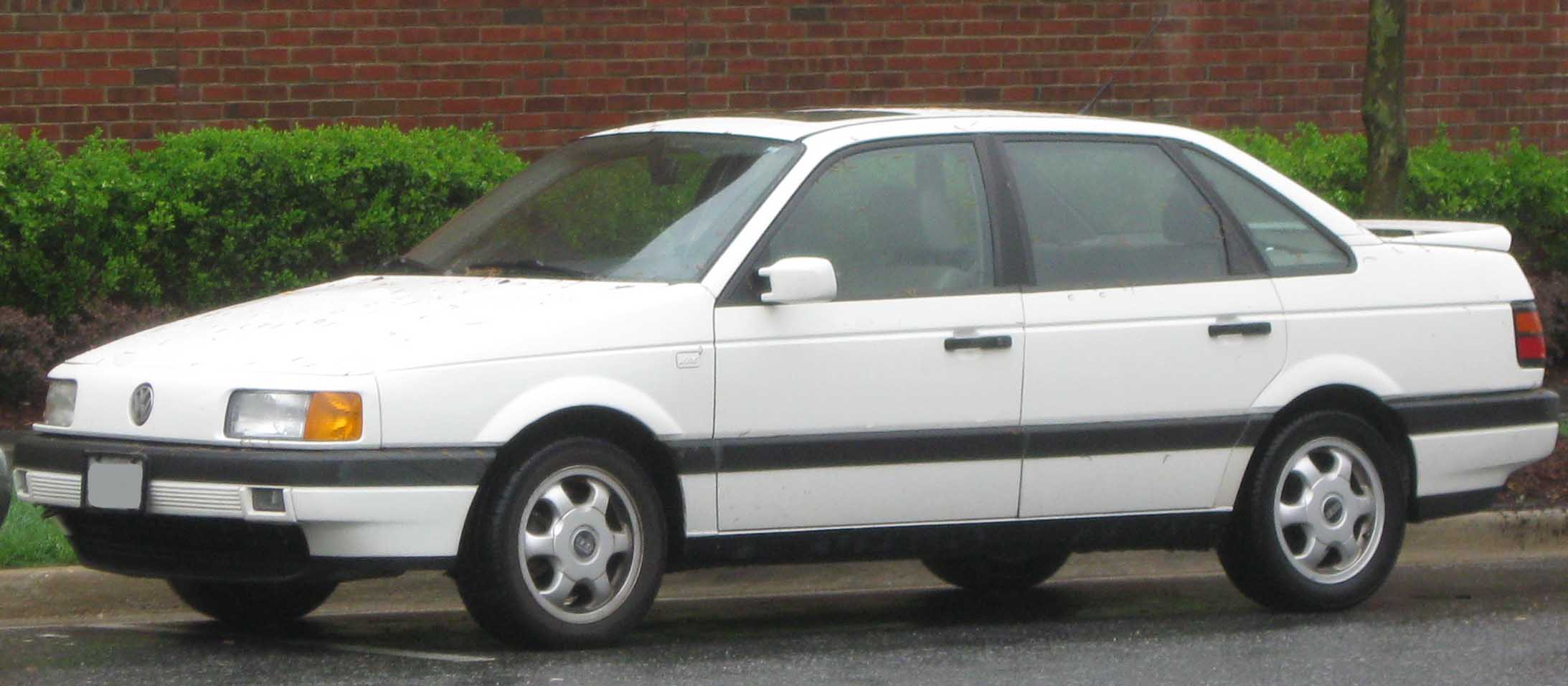
Volkswagen Passat B3 Saloon

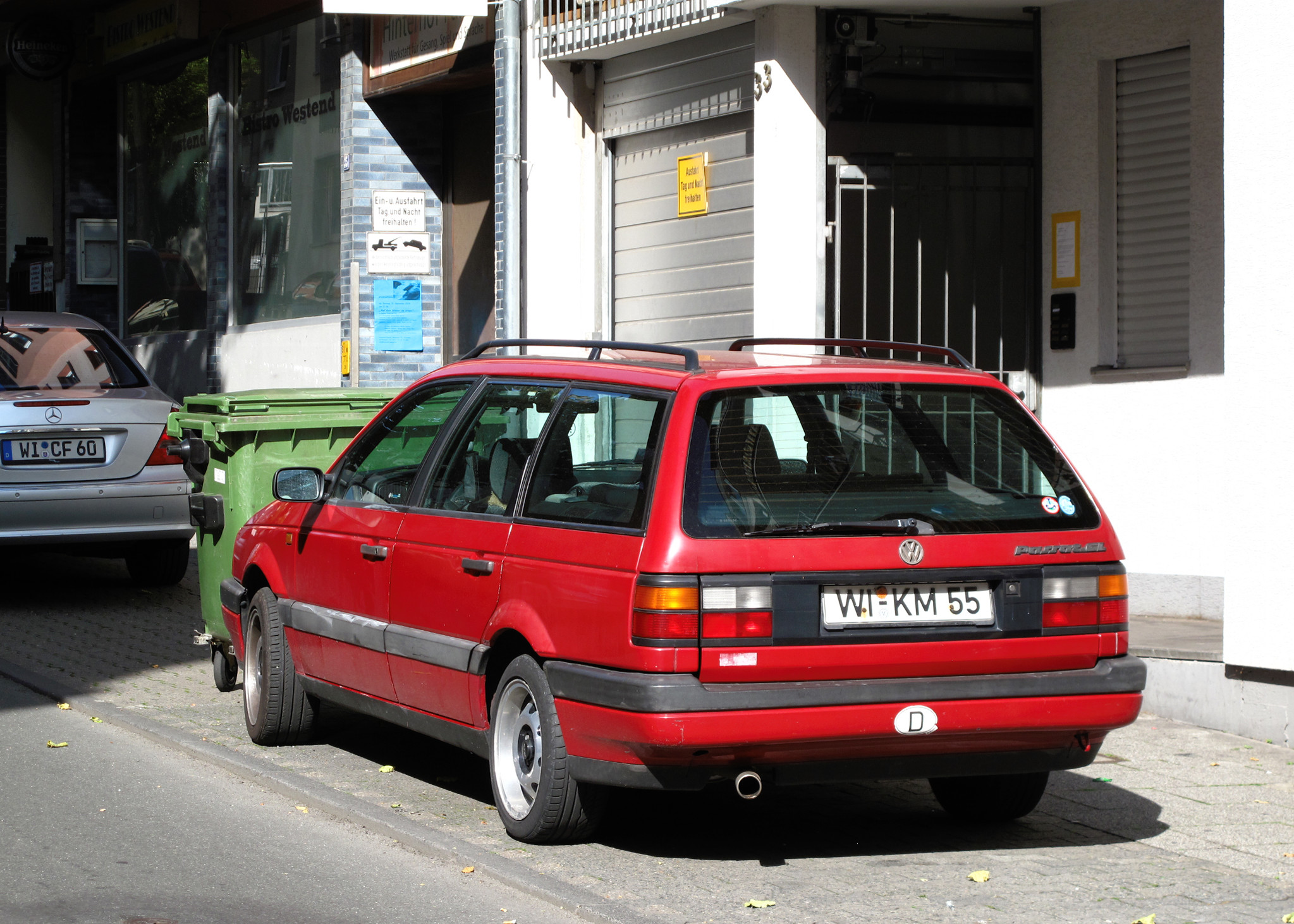
Volkswagen Passat B3 Variant

The third generation Passat was introduced in March 1988 in Europe, 1990 in North America, and 1995 in South America. The lack of a grille made the car's front end styling reminiscent of older, rear-engined Volkswagens, such as the 411, and also doubled as a modern styling trend. The styling was developed from the 1981 aerodynamic (cd 0.25) Auto 2000 concept car.

At the time, it was the first transverse engine layout Passat to be built on a Volkswagen-designed platform, rather than sharing one with an Audi saloon. The car, although designated B3 in Volkswagen's platform nomenclature, was based largely on the A platform as used for the smaller Golf model, but was stretched in all directions, and therefore had no connection with the B3 series Audi 80, launched two years earlier. Many components are shared directly between these vehicles. This generation of Passat was sold as a four-door saloon or a five-door estate, with the Passat not being sold as a hatchback from this point onwards. It was marketed under the Passat name in all markets; in North America, this was a first.

The fuel-injected petrol engines gave better performance and refinement than the carburettor units previously used. They were mounted transversely, and the floorpan was engineered to accept Volkswagen's 'Syncro' four-wheel drive system. Engine options were the 2.0-litre 16-valve engine in the GL model, 1.8-litre engine in the CL model (not available in North America, all CLs, GLs, and GLSs had the 2.0 16v), The 1.8 8v 112 bhp PB engine from the Golf GTi was also used in the Passat GT model. Volkswagen's new 2.8-litre VR6 engine (also used in the Golf and Corrado) in the GLX/GLS model (introduced in 1991 in Europe and 1992 in North America), and the G60 engine (only available on the Syncro model in Canada for the North American market). The VR6 engine gave the top-of-the-range Passat a top speed of 224 kilometres per hour (139 mph). The 1.9-litre and the 1.6-litre diesel engine were also available as options.

=== 1993 facelift (Passat B4) ===
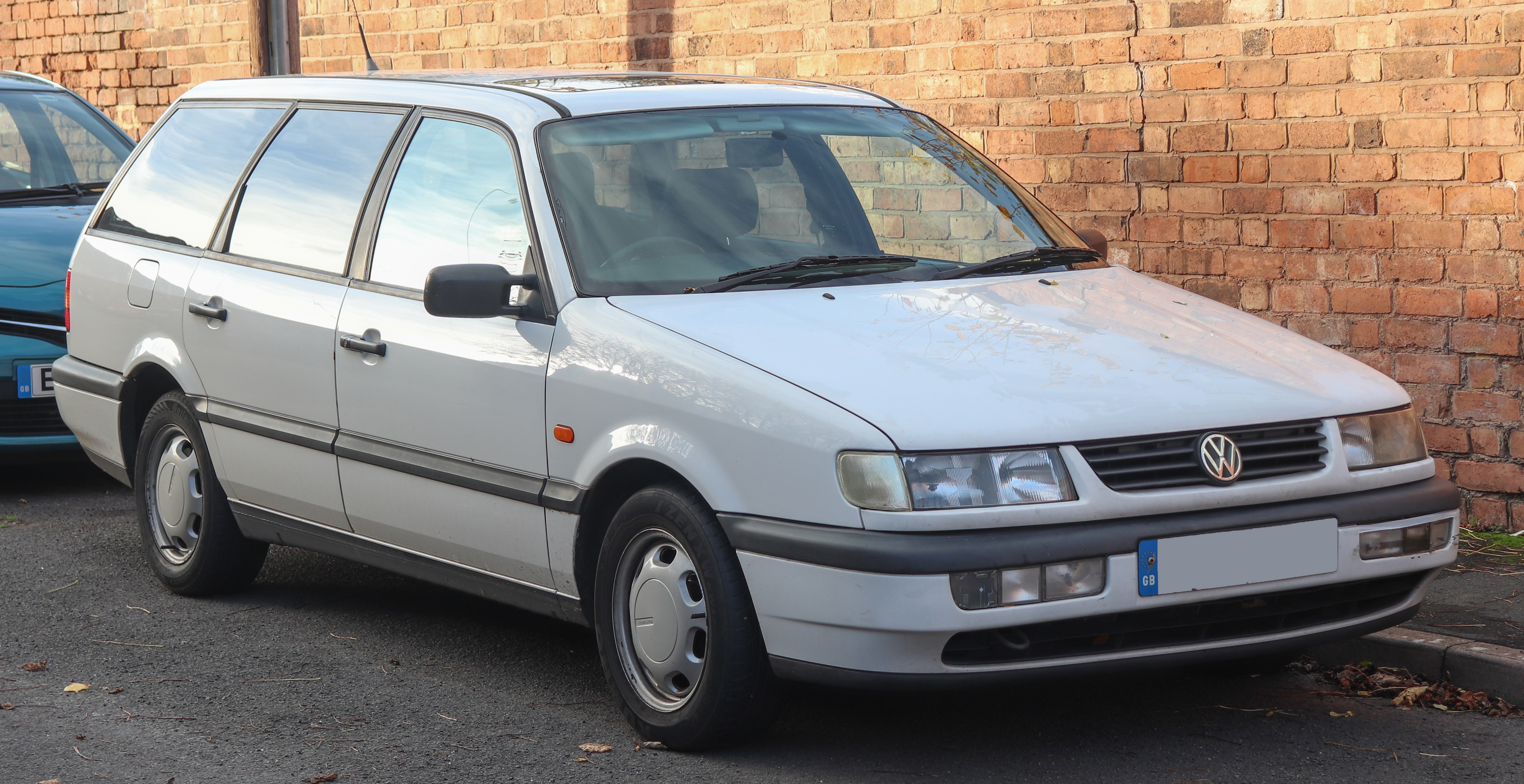
Volkswagen Passat B4 estate (United Kingdom)

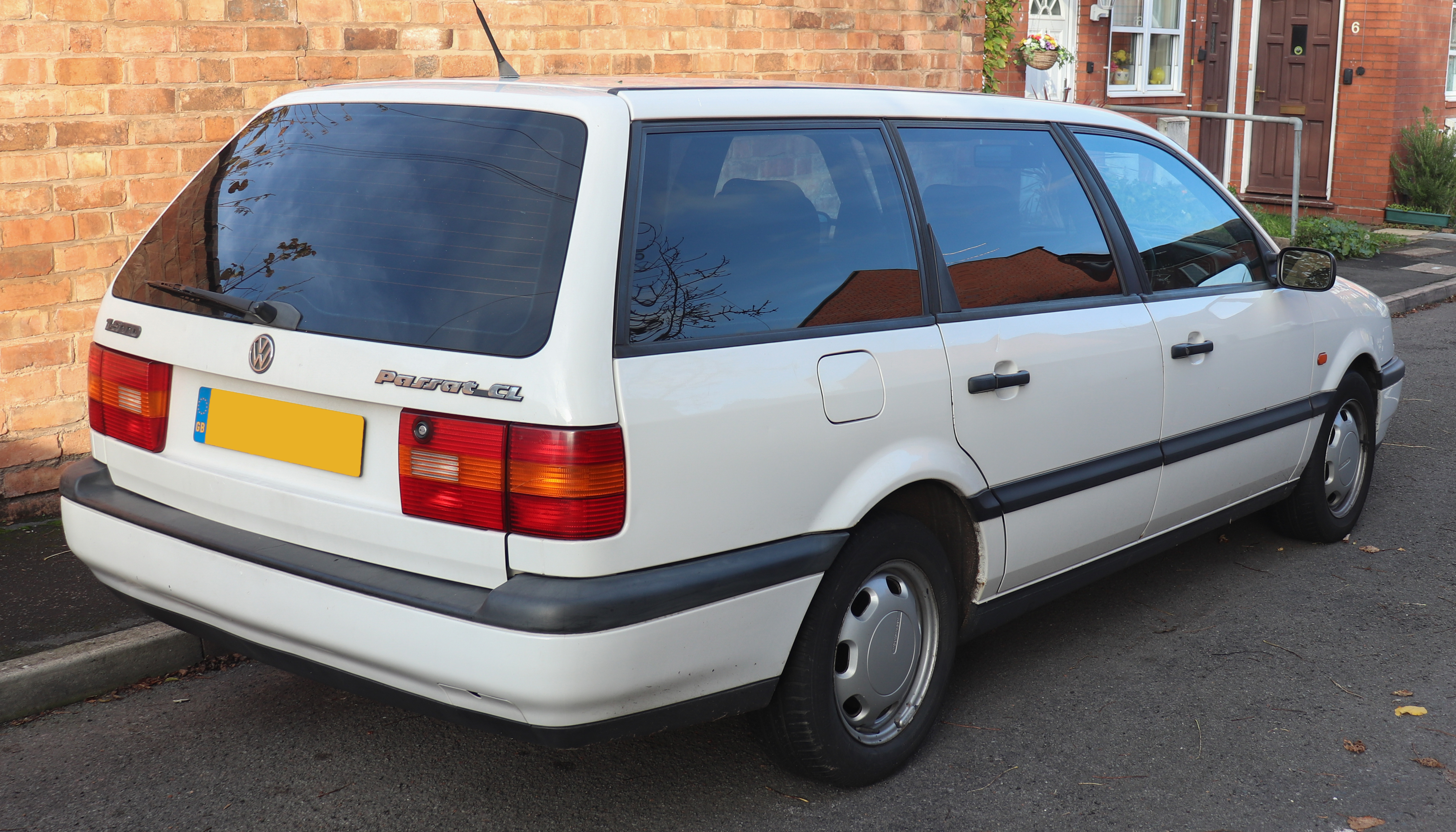
1995 Volkswagen Passat B4 Estate (United Kingdom)

The B3 Passat was heavily facelifted in 1993, and despite being designated B4, it was not an all-new model. The facelift revised external body panels except for the roof and glasshouse, with the most obvious exterior change seeing the reintroduction of a grille to match the style of the other same-generation Volkswagen models of the era, such as the Mk3 Golf and Jetta. The interior was mildly updated and included safety equipment, such as dual front airbags and seat belt pretensioners, although the basic dashboard design remained unchanged. The grille was introduced to give the front end a more aggressive appearance, as the previous model looked too 'passive'.

The car was available with a Turbocharged Direct Injection (TDI) diesel engine – an inline four-cylinder 1.9-litre turbodiesel, generating 66 kW (90 PS; 89 bhp) at 3,750 rpm and 210 N⋅m (155 lbf⋅ft) of torque at 1,900 rpm. It carried a US EPA fuel efficiency rating for the saloon of 45 miles per US gallon (5.2 L/100 km; 54 mpg_{‑imp}) highway. Combined with a 98 litres (21.6 imp gal; 25.9 US gal) 28 litres (6.2 imp gal; 7.4 US gal) reserve option fuel tank, the B4 TDI estate had an 1800+ km (1200+ mi) range on a single tank of fuel. The B4 TDI estate saw less than 1,000 sales in the US during its 1996 to 1997 lifespan.

== B5 (Typ 3B, 1996) and B5.5 (3BG; 2001) ==
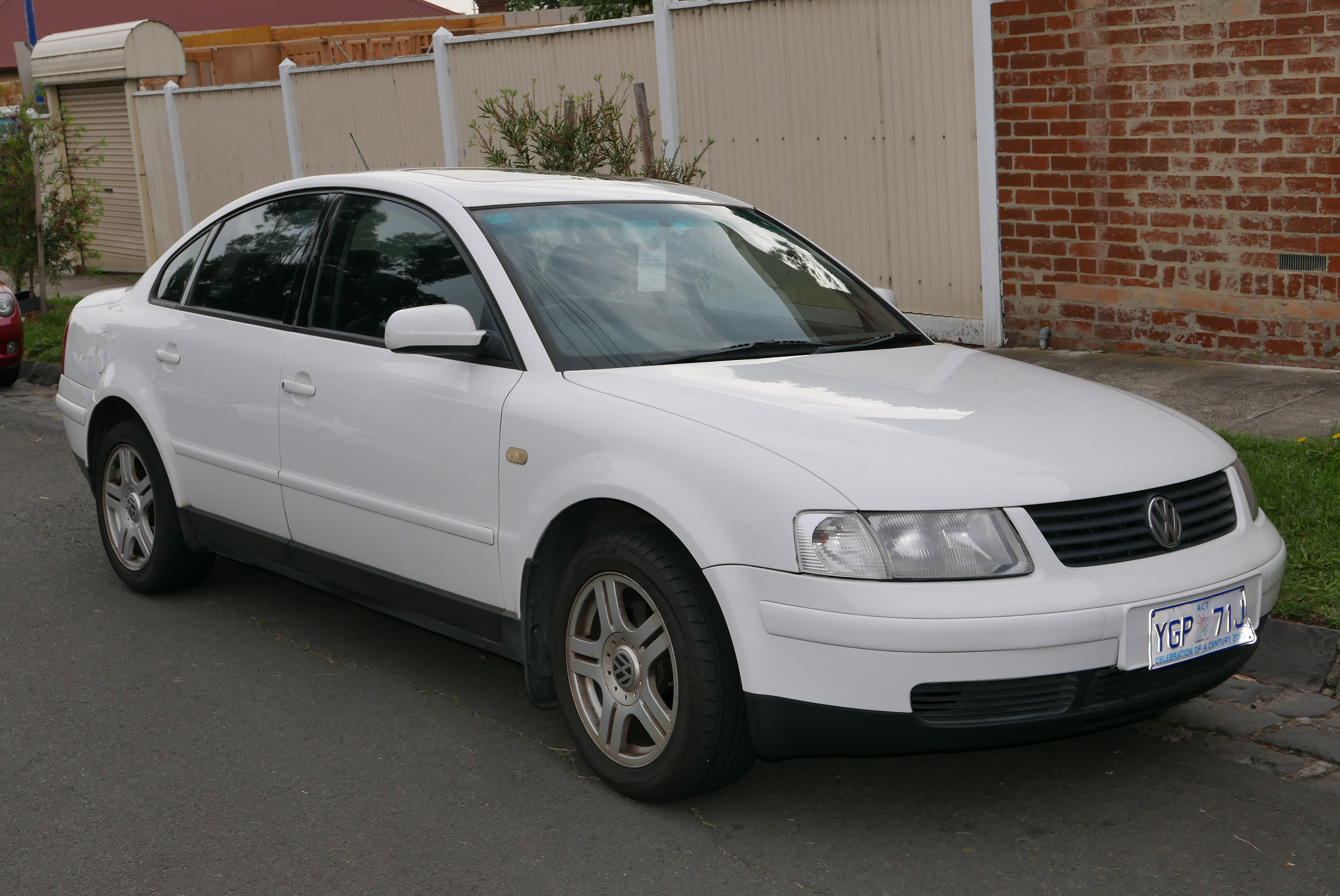
Volkswagen Passat B5 saloon (Australia)

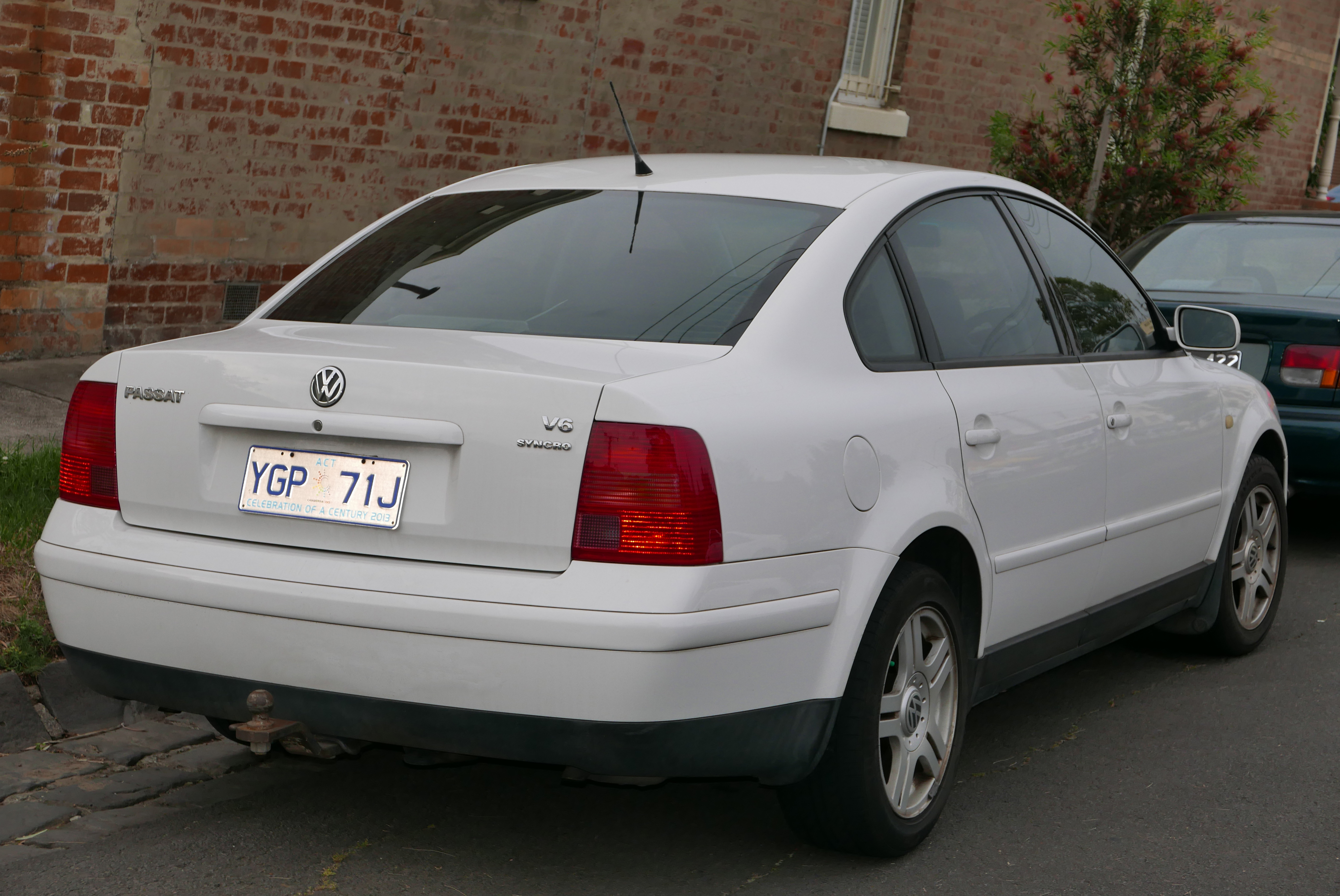
Volkswagen Passat B5 saloon (Australia)

An all-new Passat, based on the Volkswagen Group B5 platform, was first launched in Germany in the summer of 1996 and later on in February 1997 in Continental Europe and the United Kingdom, and 1998 in North America as well as Australia. Its PL45 platform was shared with the first-generation "Typ 8D" Audi A4, which was unveiled two years earlier, and saw a return to the Passat sharing its longitudinal engine layout platform with Audi's equivalent model for the first time since the second-generation (B2) Passat of 1981, which shared its platform with the second-generation "Typ 81" Audi 80/Audi 90 (the A4 is the successor to the Audi 80 line).

The Passat introduced a new design language, first seen on the Concept 1 concept car, for the latest generation of Volkswagens, such as the Mk4 Golf, Bora and Polo Mk4. Aerodynamic work gave the B5 Passat a coefficient of drag of 0.27 (saloon model).

The car featured a fully independent four-link front suspension; and a semi-independent torsion beam rear suspension for front-wheel-drive models or a fully independent suspension on the 4motion 4WD models. 4WD was introduced in 1997 as an option for the 1.8-litre, 2.8-litre V6, 1.9-litre TDI, 2.0-litre TDI and 2.5-litre V6 TDI engines, using a second-generation Torsen T-2 based 4WD system to minimise loss of traction. The 1.8-litre petrol engine in the Passat and Audi A4 has a lower oil capacity than transverse applications of the same engine (4.6 US quarts (4.4 L) in transverse, 4.3 US quarts (4.1 L) longitudinal), and may suffer from oil sludge problems as a result, if not changed at regular intervals with fully synthetic oils. Four transmission options were available: a 5-speed manual transmission, a 6-speed manual transmission (codename 01E), a 4-speed automatic transmission and a 5-speed automatic transmission with tiptronic.

The 1.6-litre petrol engine had been dropped by 1999, leaving the 1.8-litre 20-valve as the entry-level engine.

=== 2001 facelift (Passat B5.5 – Typ 3BG) ===
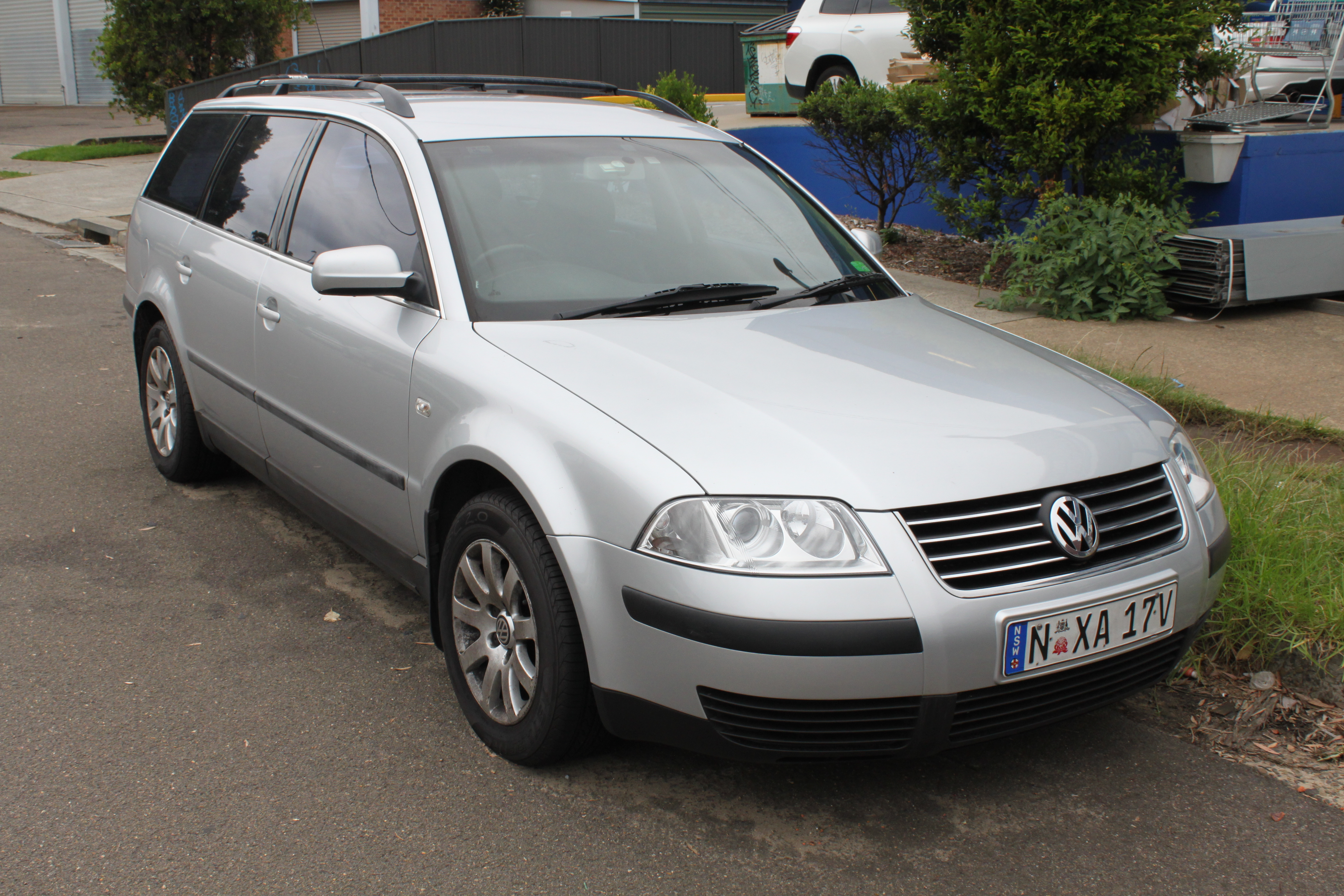

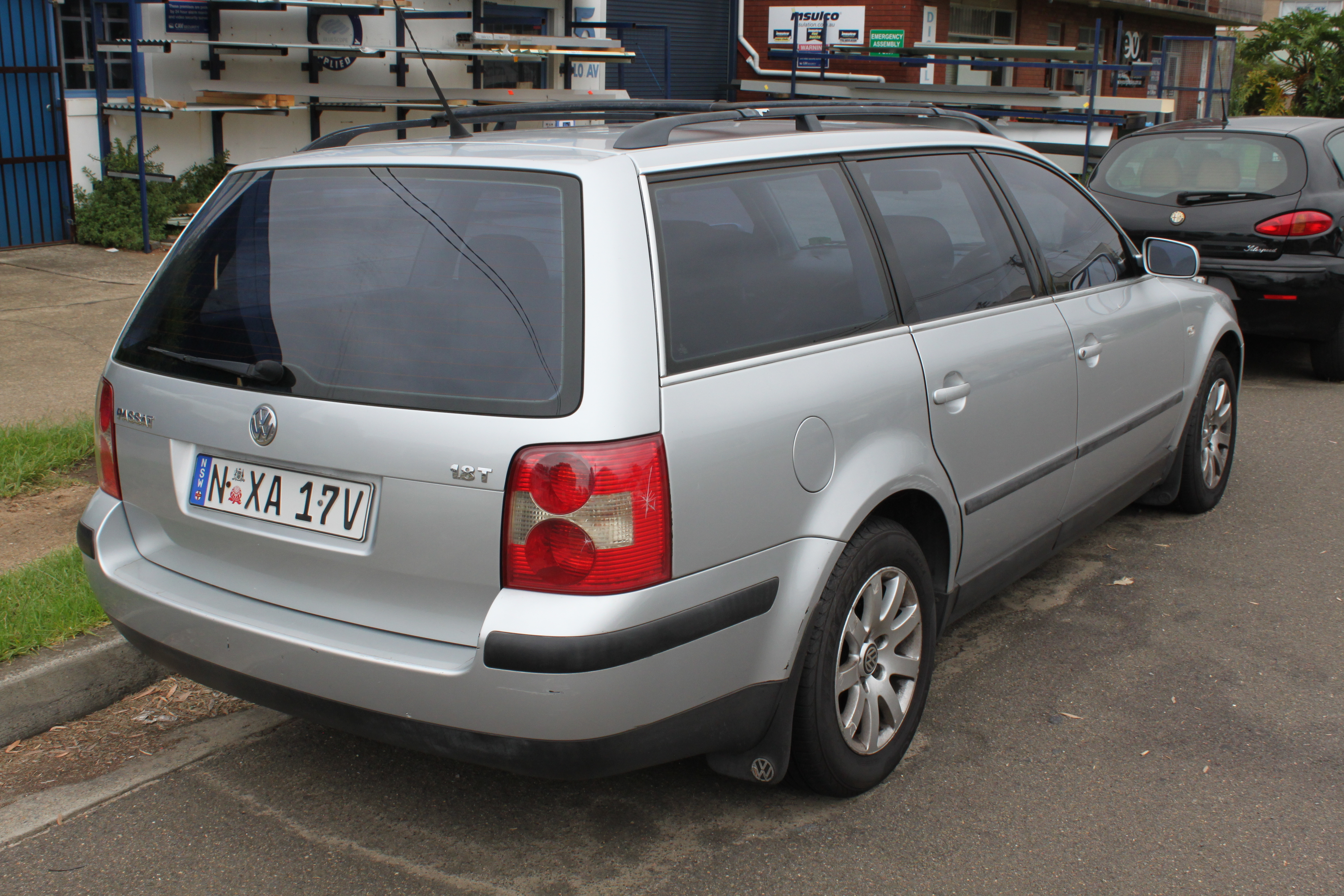
2001 Volkswagen Passat 1.8 T estate (Australia)

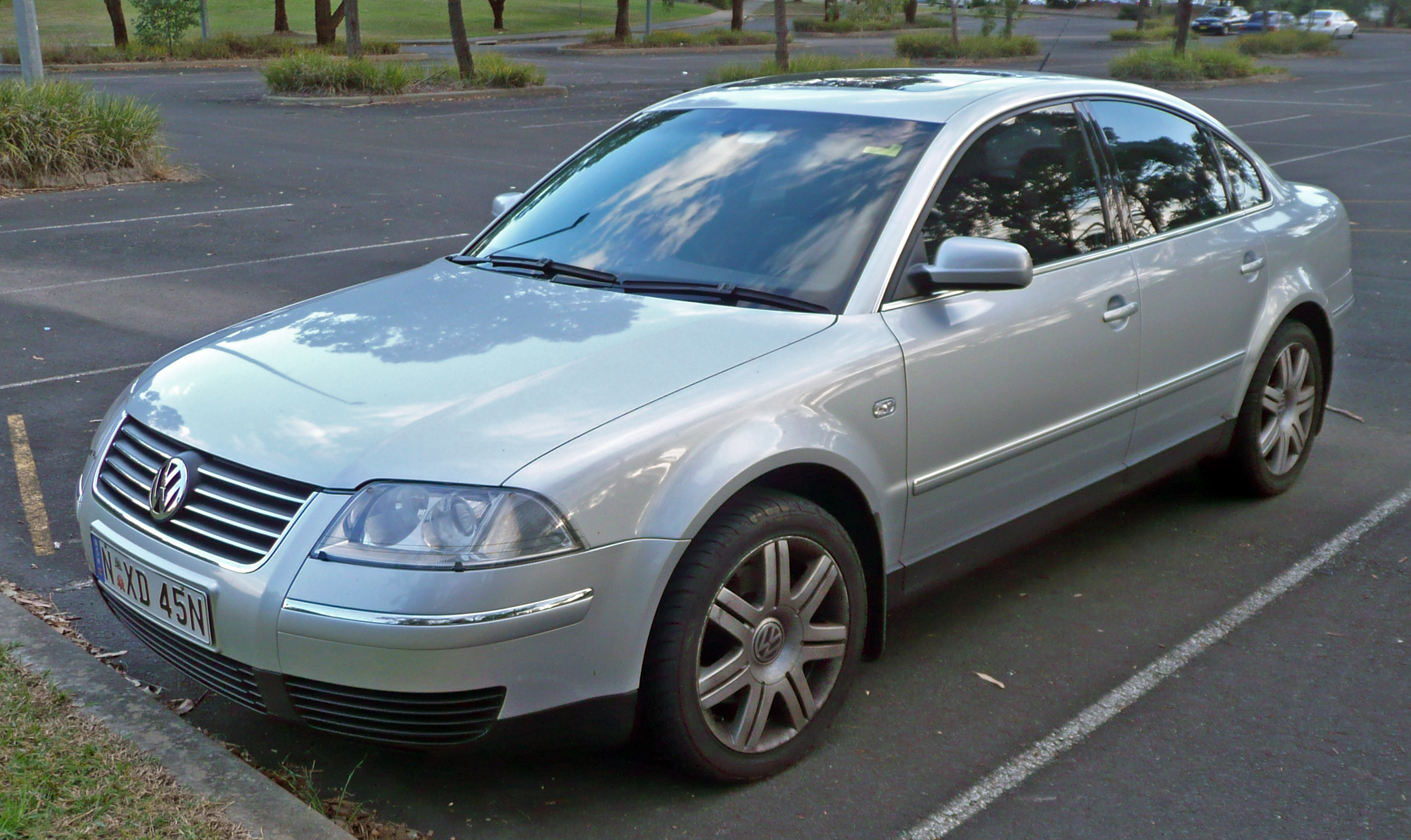

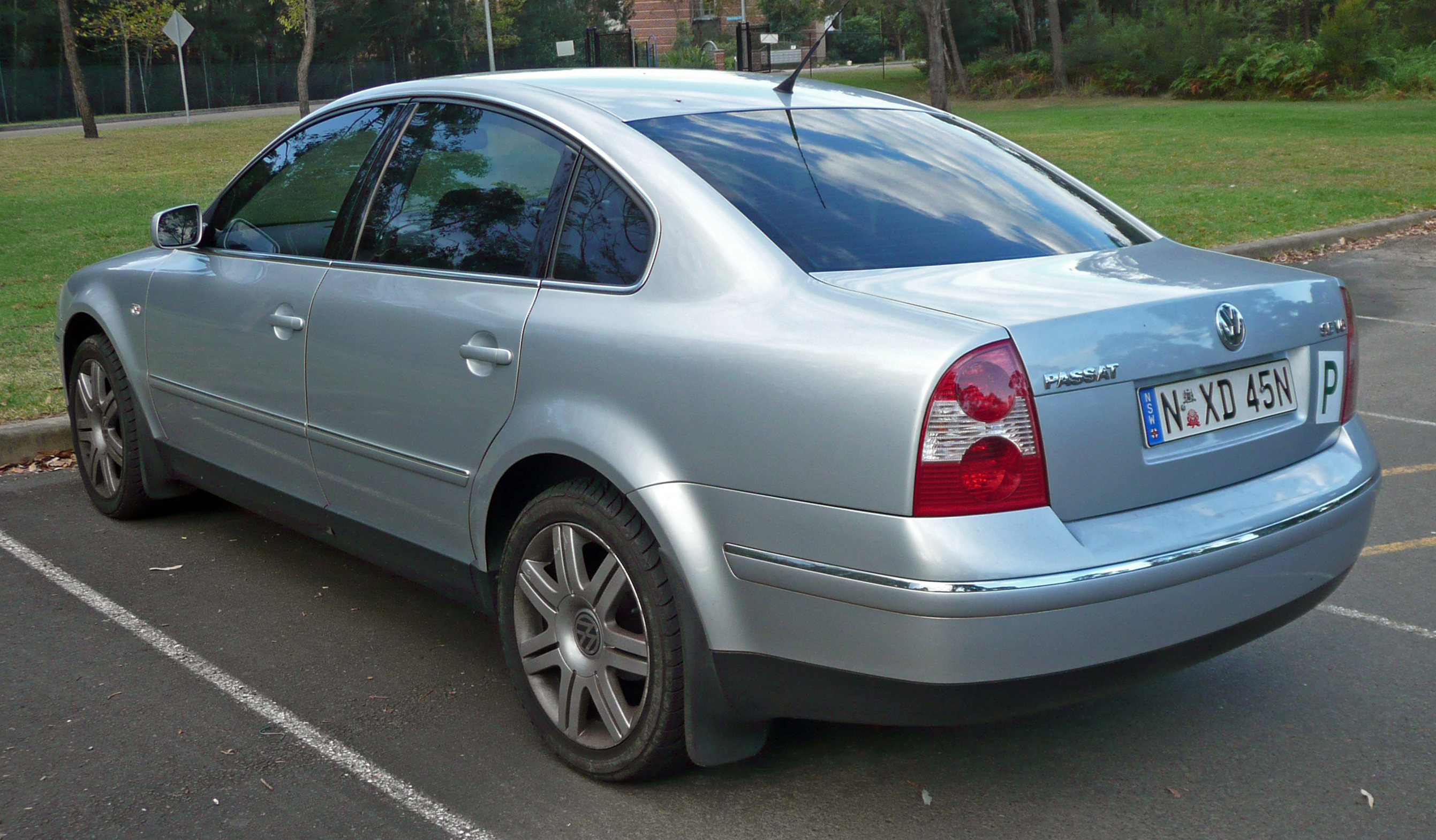
2003 Volkswagen Passat B5.5 SE V6 saloon (Australia)

The B5.5 Passat began production in late 2000, with styling and mechanical revisions, including revised projector-optic headlamps, bumpers, tail lights, and chrome trim.

A 4.0-litre W8 engine producing 275 PS (202 kW) was introduced in 2001 in a luxury version of the car that included standard 4motion all-wheel drive. This engine was intended to be a test bed for Volkswagen Group's new W engine technology, which would later make an appearance on the W12 in the Phaeton, Audi A8, and Bentley Continental GT, and the W16 engine in the Bugatti Veyron. The engine was discontinued in 2004.

== B6 (Typ 3C; 2005) and B7 (2010) ==
The B6 debuted at the Geneva Motor Show in March 2005, and launched in Europe in the summer of 2005 for the 2006 model year. Unlike its predecessor, the B6 Passat no longer shared its platform with Audi's equivalent model (the Audi A4). Based on a modified version of the Mk5 Golf's PQ35 platform (PQ46), the B6 featured a transverse rather than longitudinal engine layout of its predecessor, like the previous B3 and B4 generations, which were related to the A2 (Golf) platform. The PQ46 platform provided increased torsional rigidity.

At the Frankfurt Motor Show in September 2007, Volkswagen launched the 'R Line' R36, created by Volkswagen Individual GmbH, which uses a 3.6 litre VR6 engine rated 221 kW; 296 bhp (300 PS) and 350 N⋅m (258 lbf⋅ft) of torque.

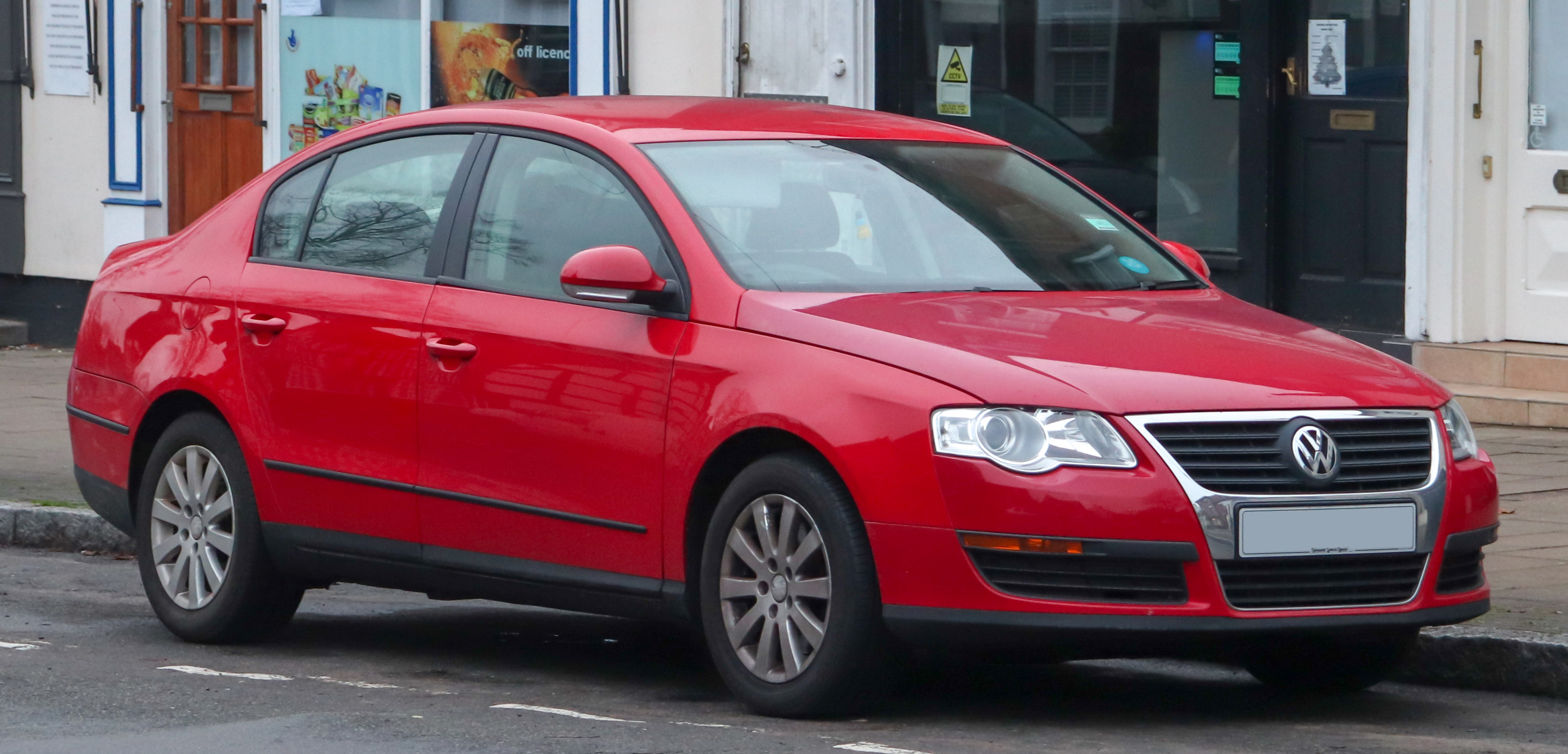
Volkswagen Passat B6 Saloon (front)

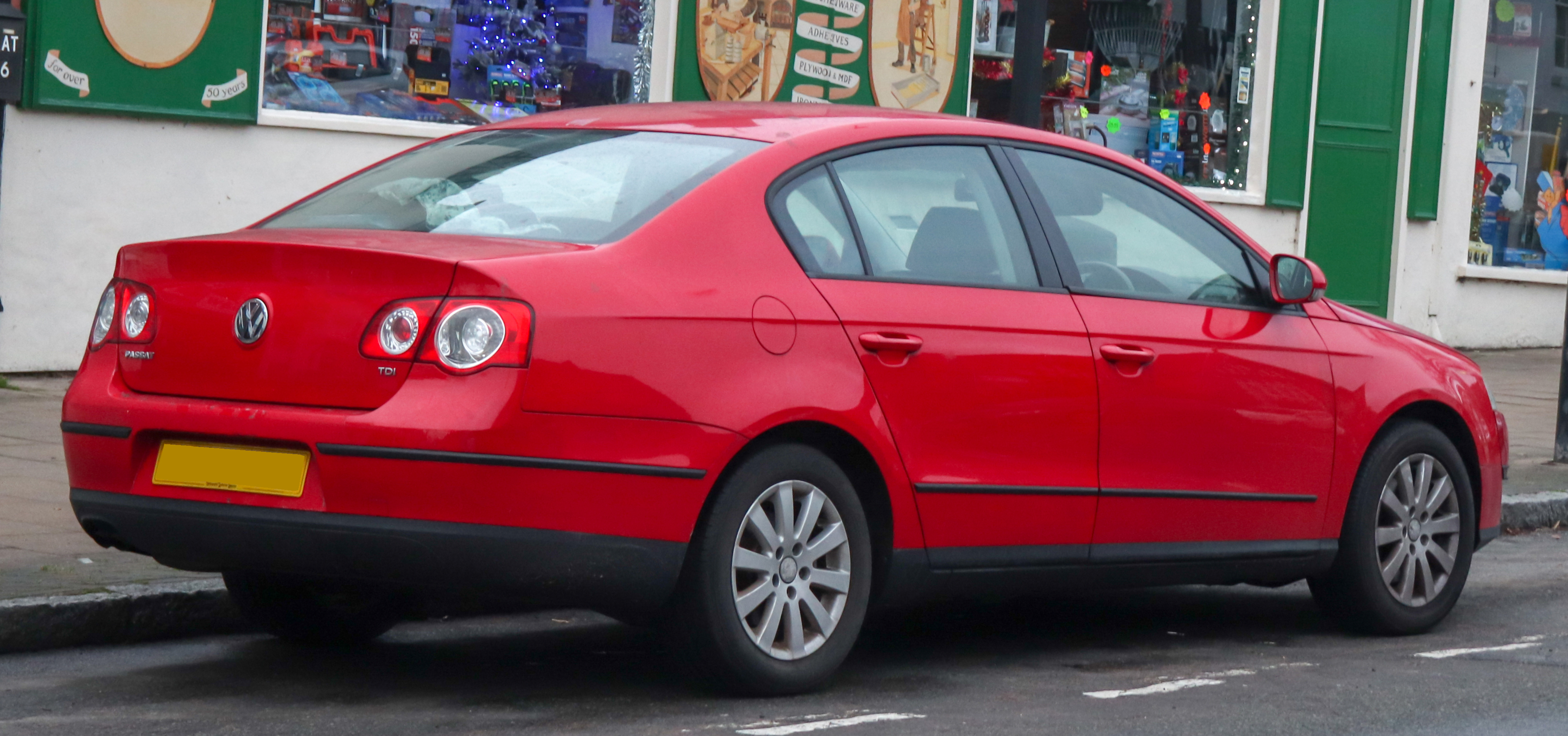
Volkswagen Passat B6 Saloon (rear)

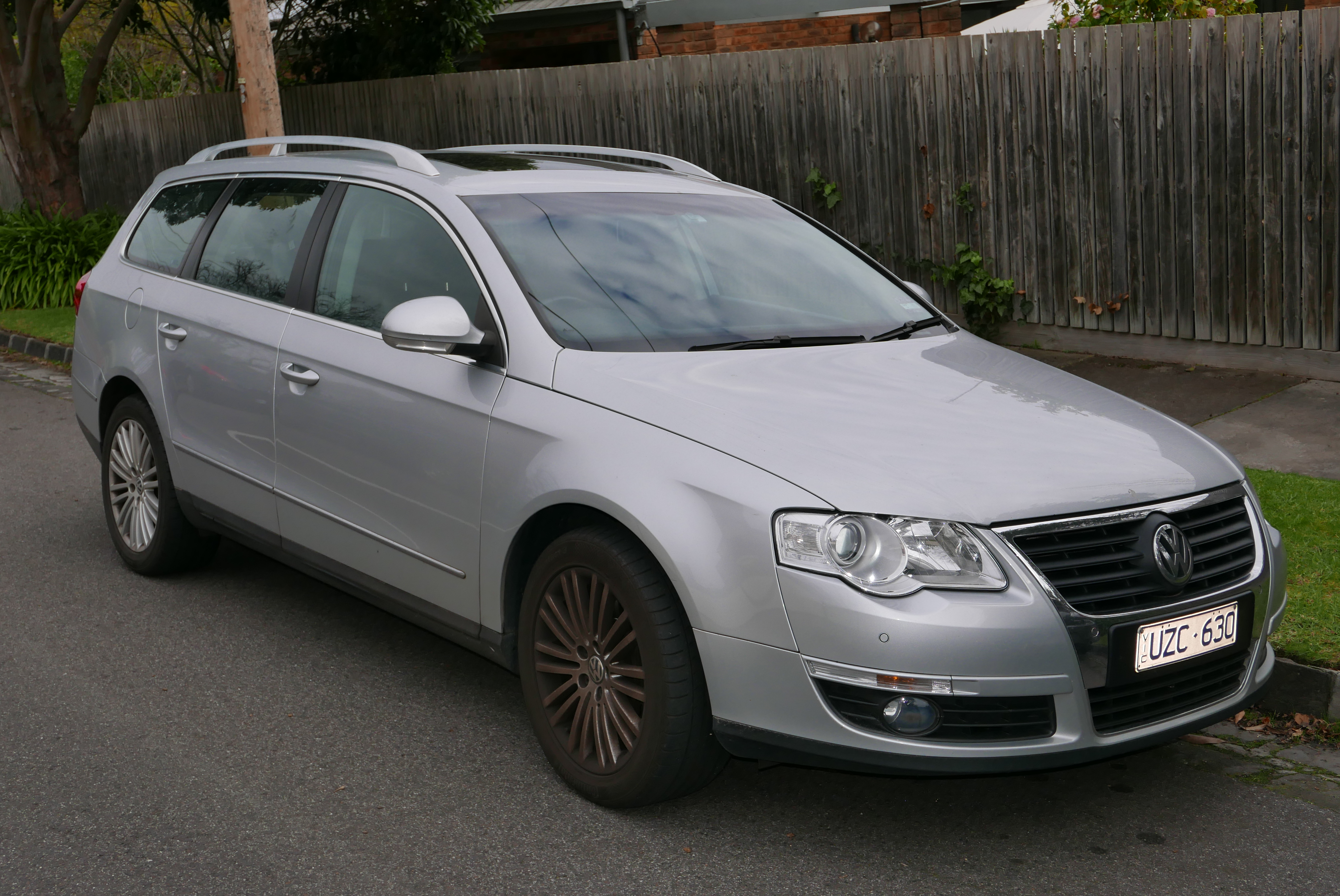
Volkswagen Passat B6 Variant (front)

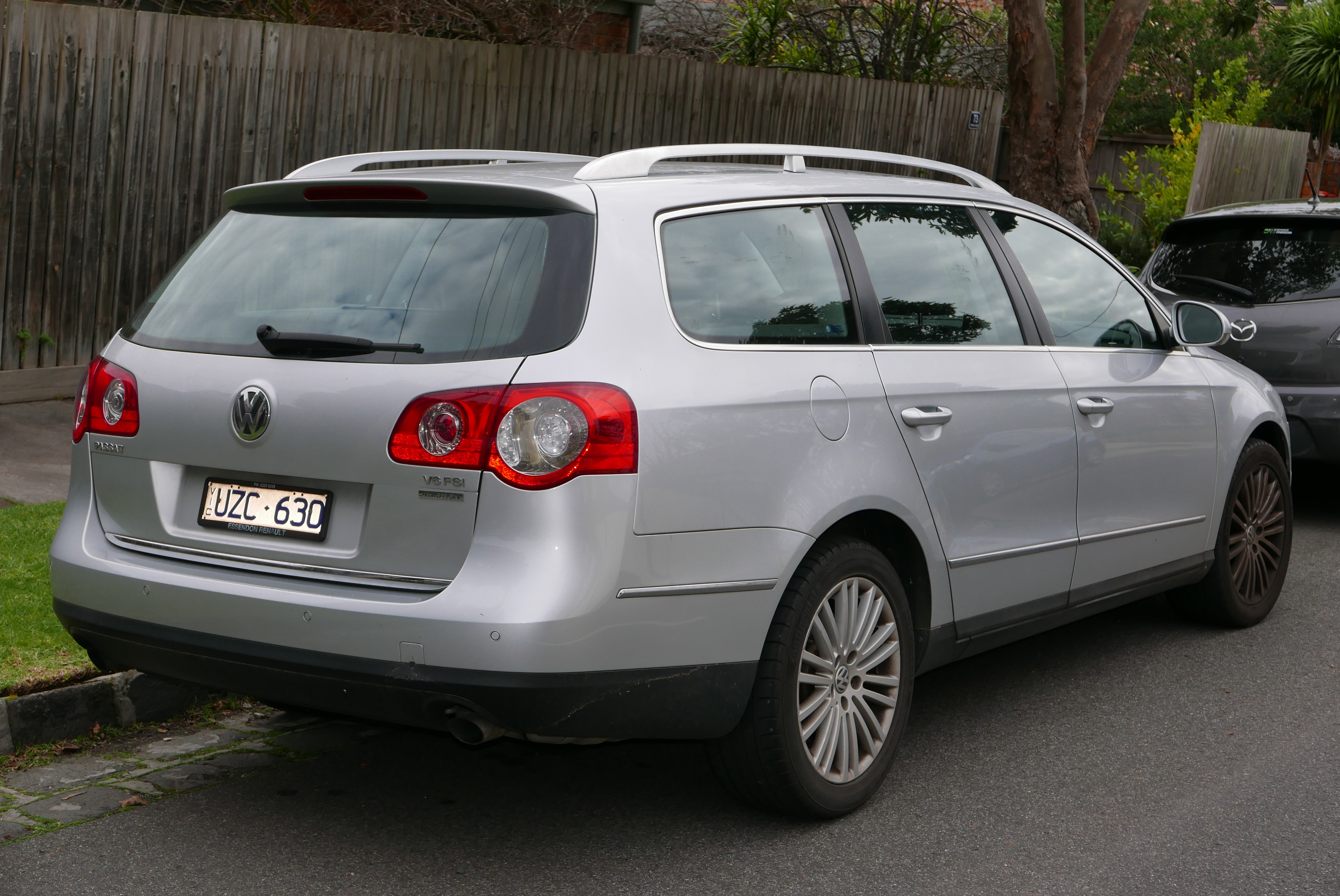
Volkswagen Passat B6 Variant (rear)

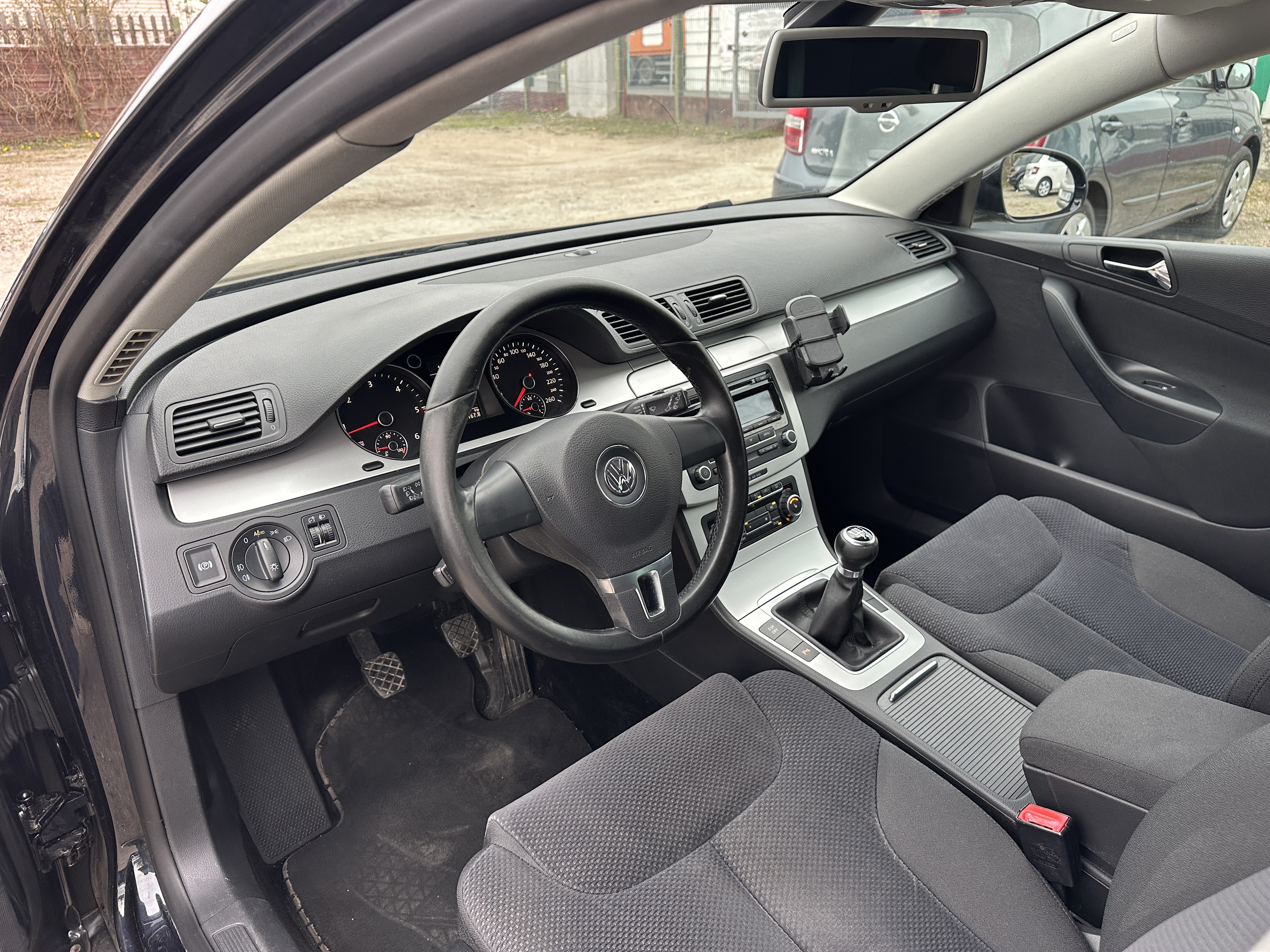
Front interior of a Volkswagen Passat Variant B6 (2010), seen from the driver side

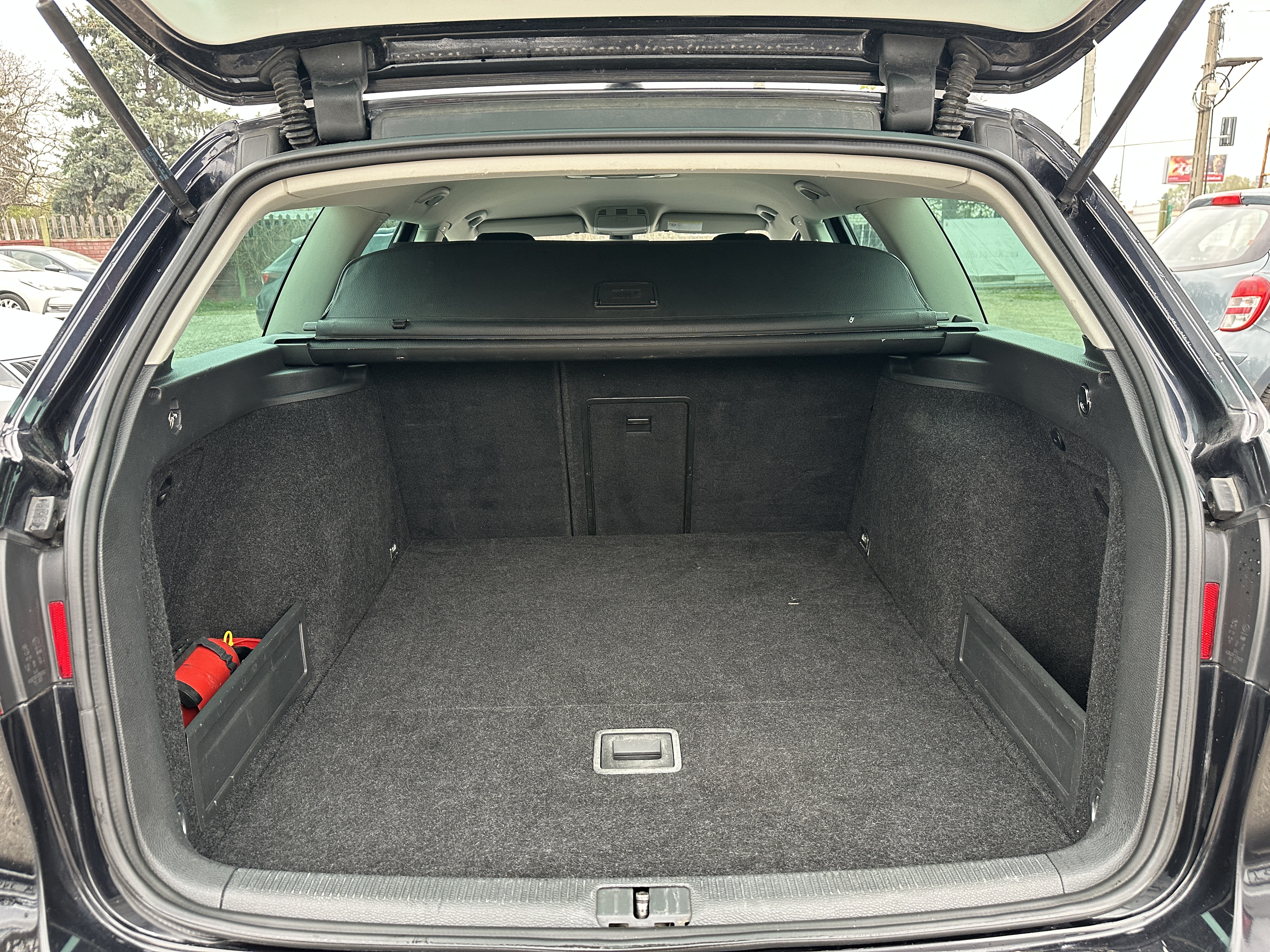
Luggage compartment of a Volkswagen Passat Variant B6 (2010)

=== Passat CC ===
The CC ("Comfort Coupé") is a 4-door coupé version of the Passat. It debuted at the 2008 North American International Auto Show in Detroit. Originally aimed at competing with the similarly styled Mercedes CLS, the Passat CC intends to be more stylish and luxurious than the previously released Passat B6. In the US, the name Passat was dropped, and the car was sold as just CC.

Volkswagen facelifted the Passat CC in late 2011 for the 2012 year, with styling updates akin to those of the larger Phaeton. For the updated model, Volkswagen has dropped the Passat name for all markets, now matching the Volkswagen CC branding used since 2008 in North America.

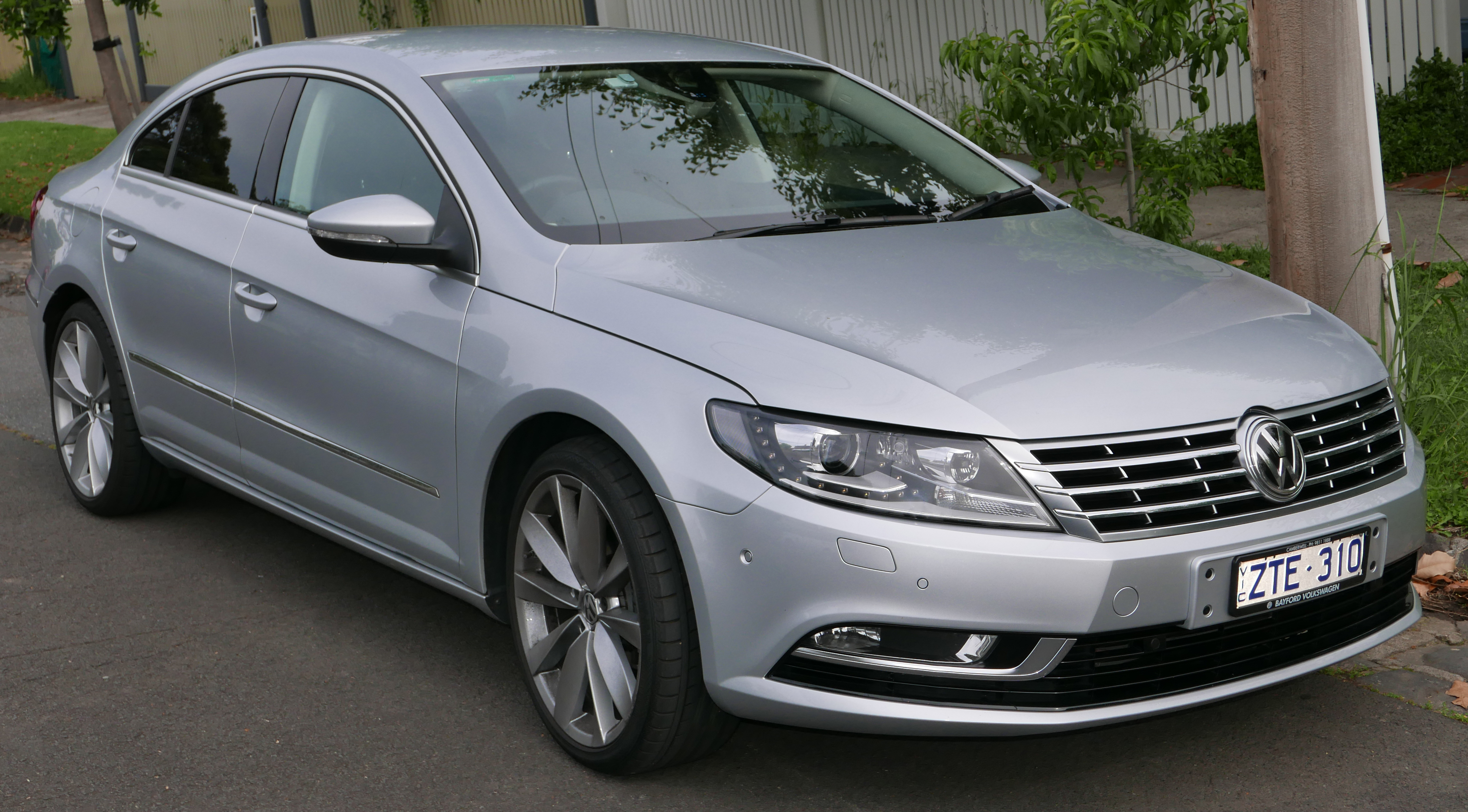
Volkswagen CC (front)

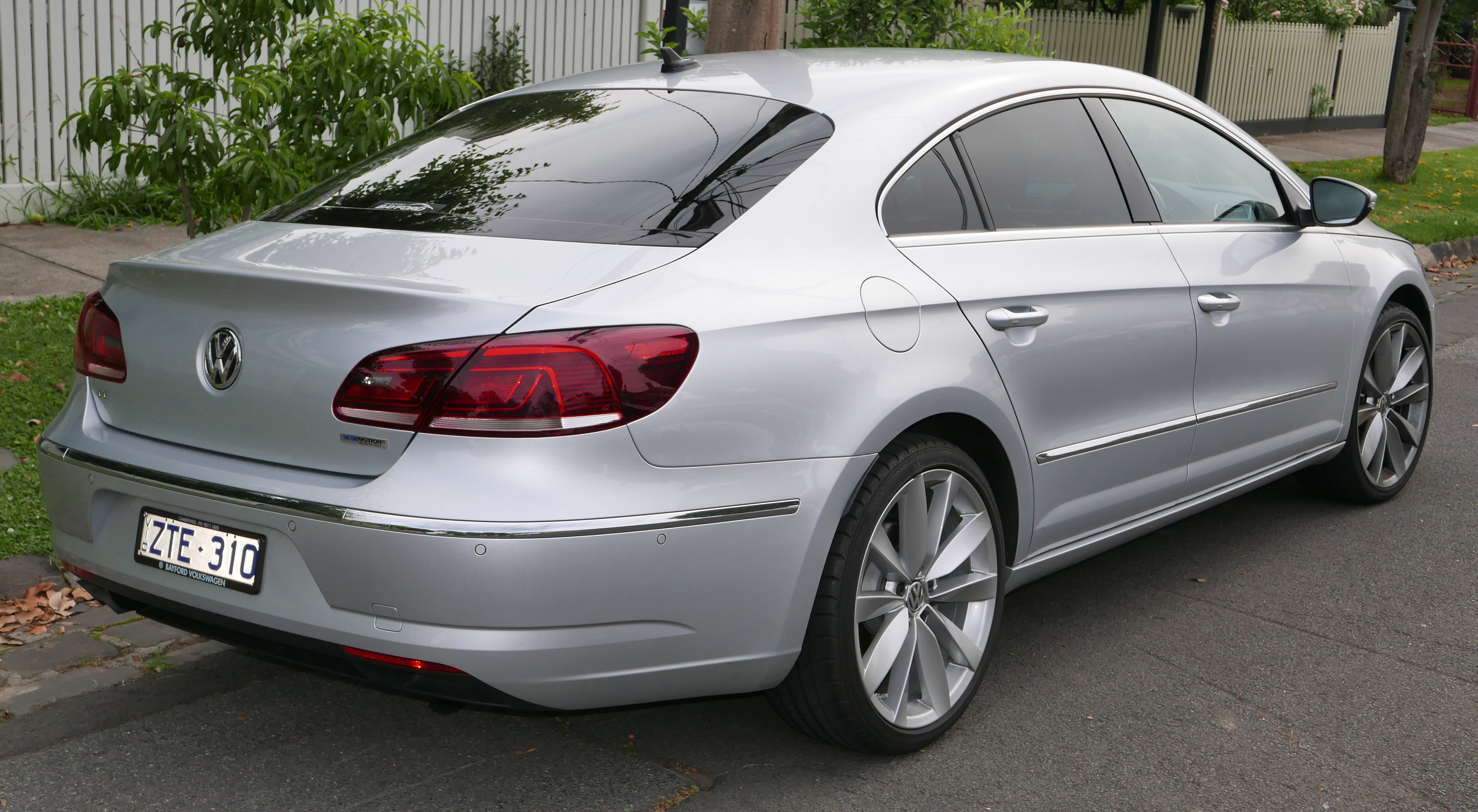
Volkswagen CC (rear)

=== 2010 facelift (Passat B7) ===
The B6 Passat was facelifted by Klaus Bischoff and Walter de Silva , unveiled at the 2010 Paris Motor Show. Although designated "B7" by VW enthusiasts, the car is not an all-new model. The facelift resulted in new external body panels except for the roof and glasshouse, with the prominent changes to the grille and headlamps, and minor changes to the interior. Overall height and width dimensions are unchanged from the B6 Passat, while length was increased by 4 mm.

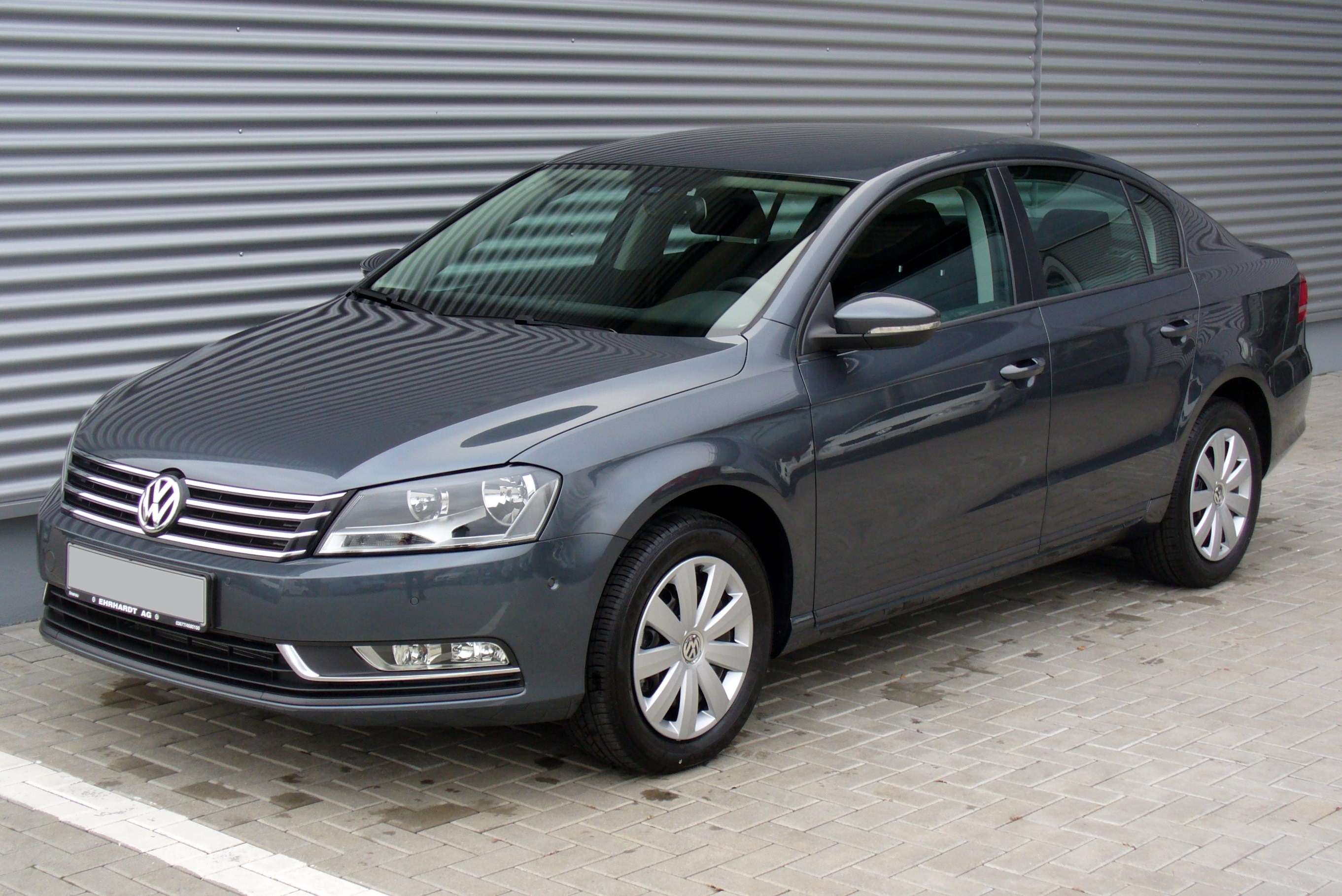
Facelifted Volkswagen Passat B7 Saloon (front)

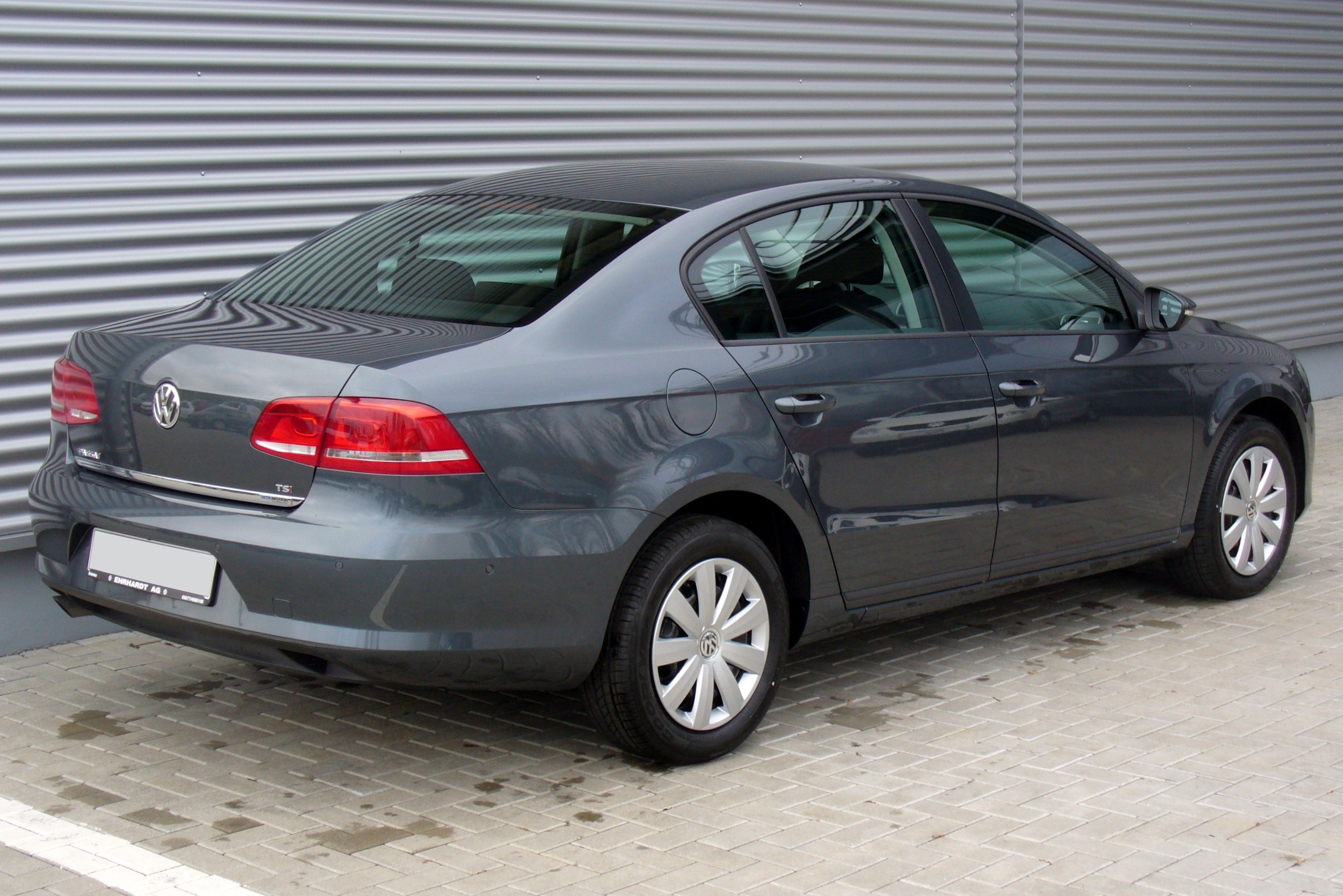
Facelifted Volkswagen Passat B7 Saloon (rear)

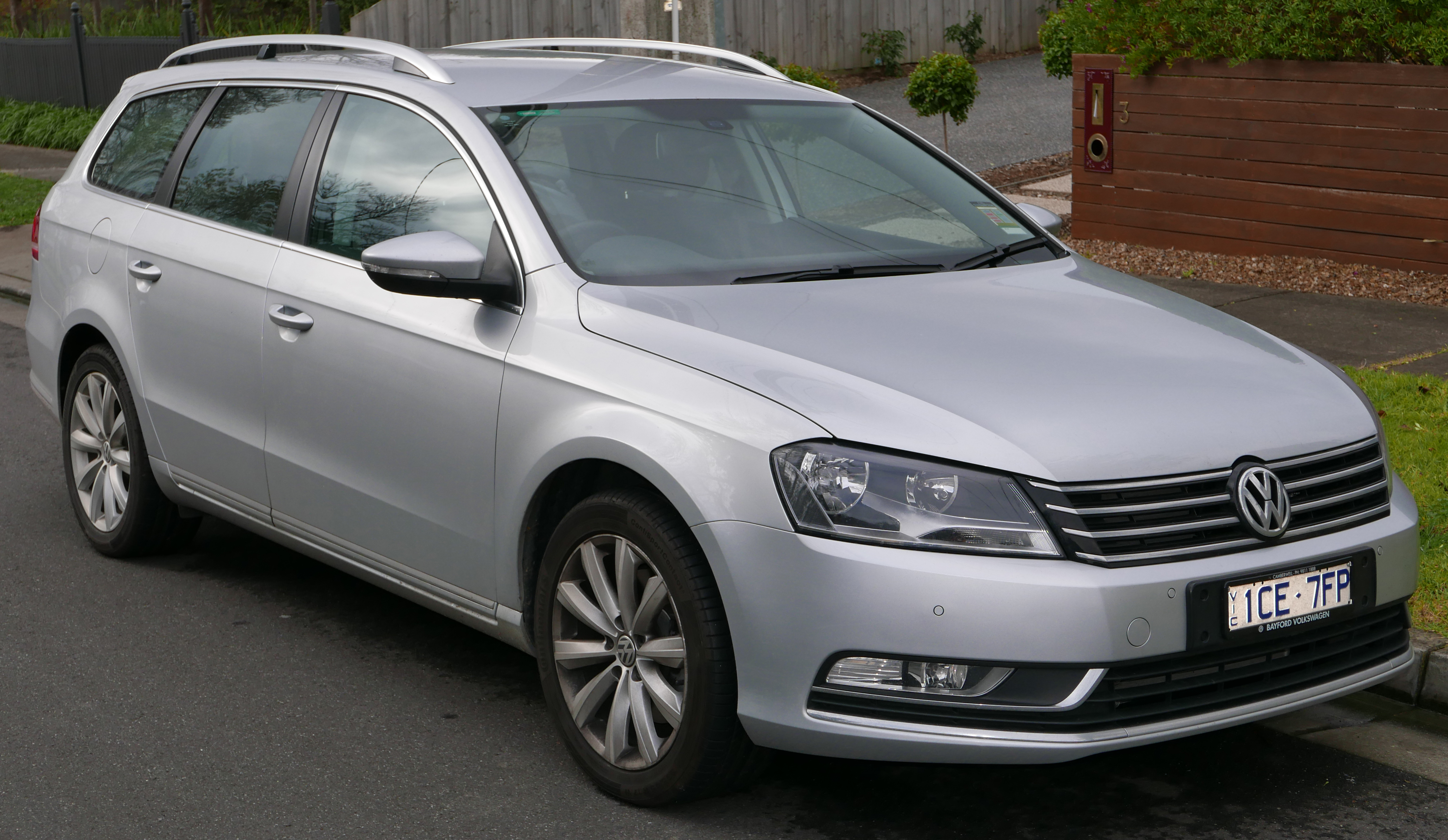
Facelifted Volkswagen Passat B7 Variant (front)

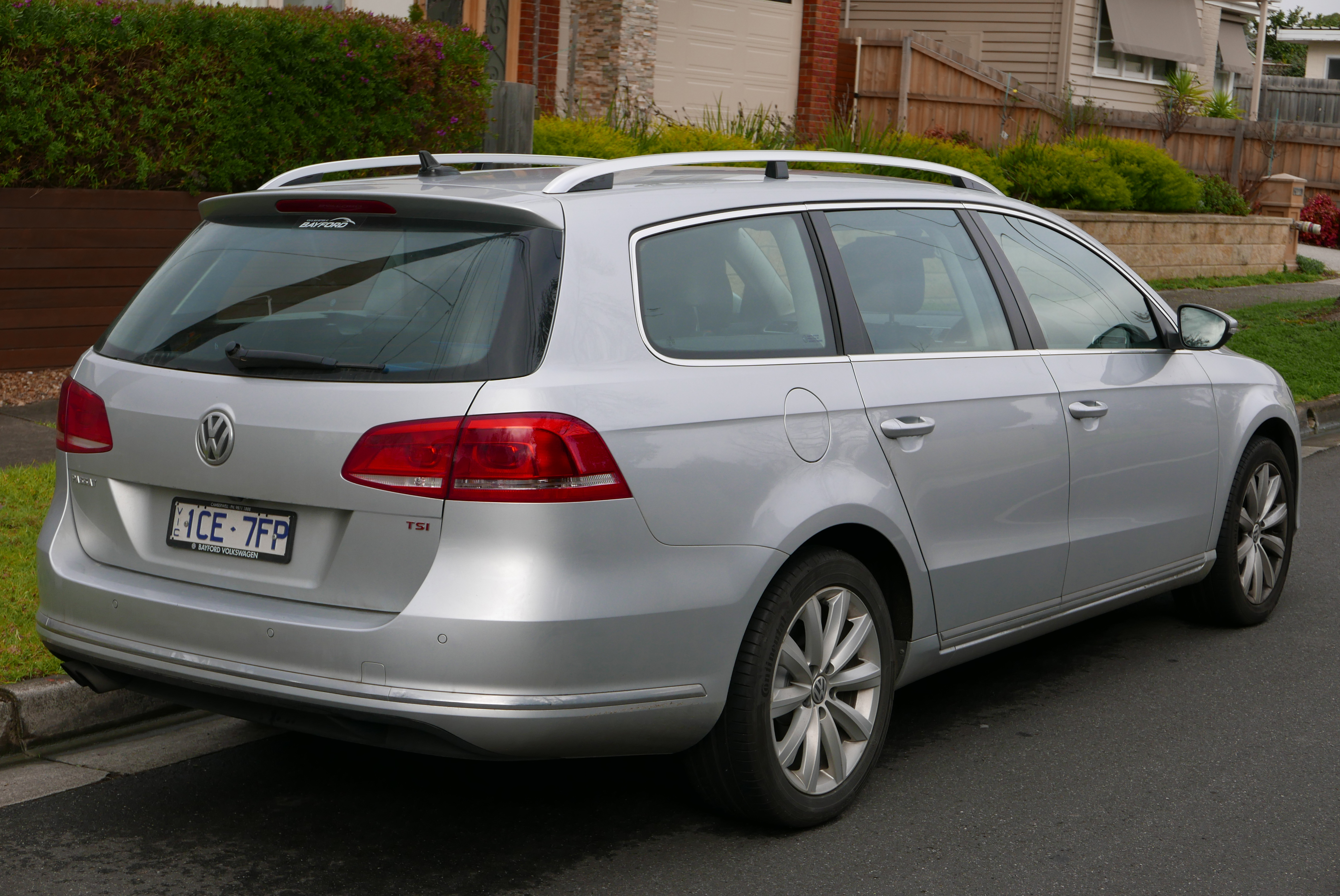
Facelifted Volkswagen Passat B7 Variant (rear)

=== Passat Alltrack ===
In October 2010, Volkswagen presented at the 2011 Tokyo Motor Show the Passat Alltrack. The Passat Alltrack bridges the gap between the passenger VW range and the SUV range comprising the Tiguan and Touareg. The Passat Alltrack was aimed at competing with the Subaru Outback, which created a new market niche; both the Alltrack and Outback bear resemblance in ride height and external body kit.

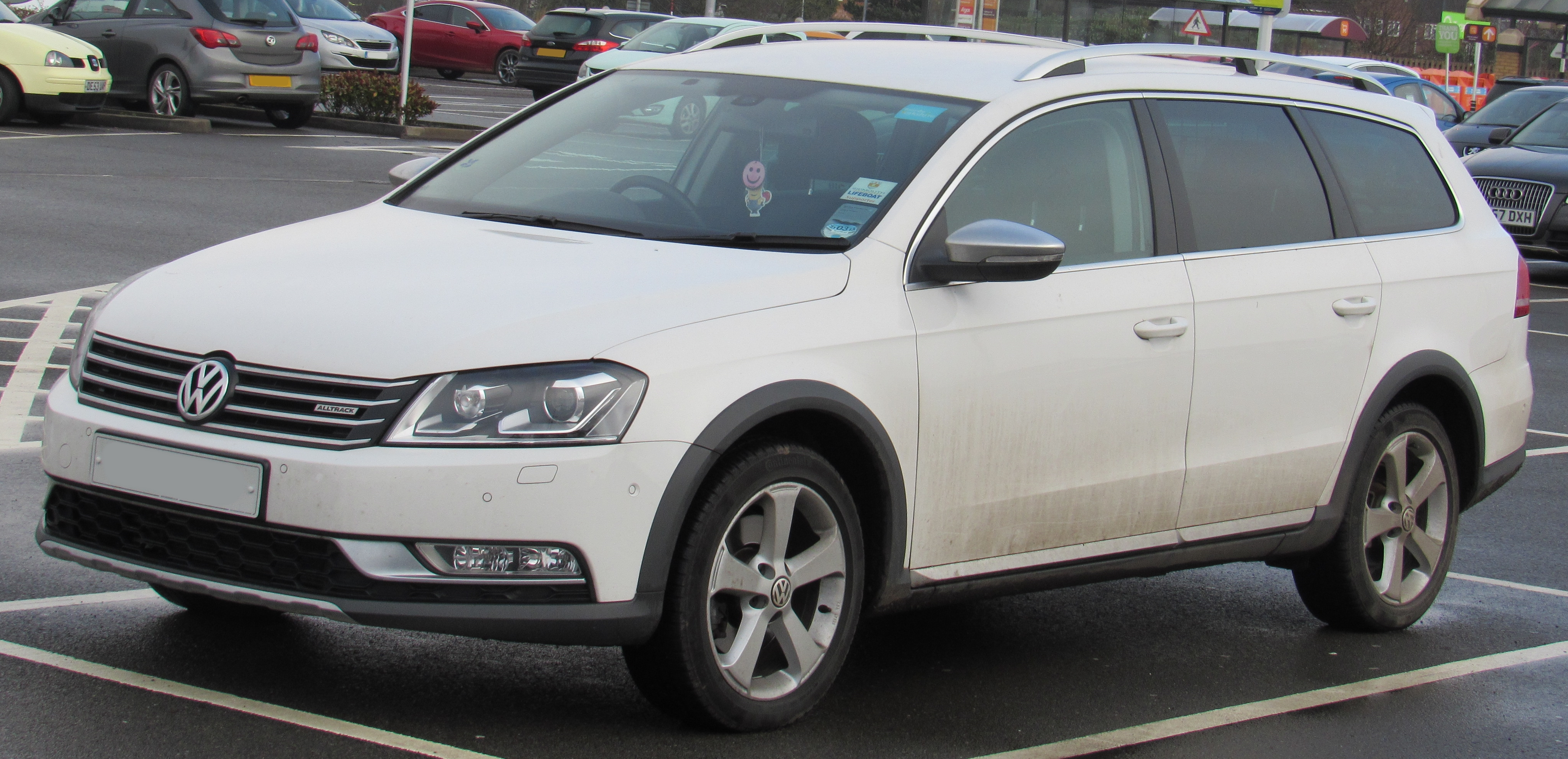
Volkswagen Passat B7 Alltrack (front)

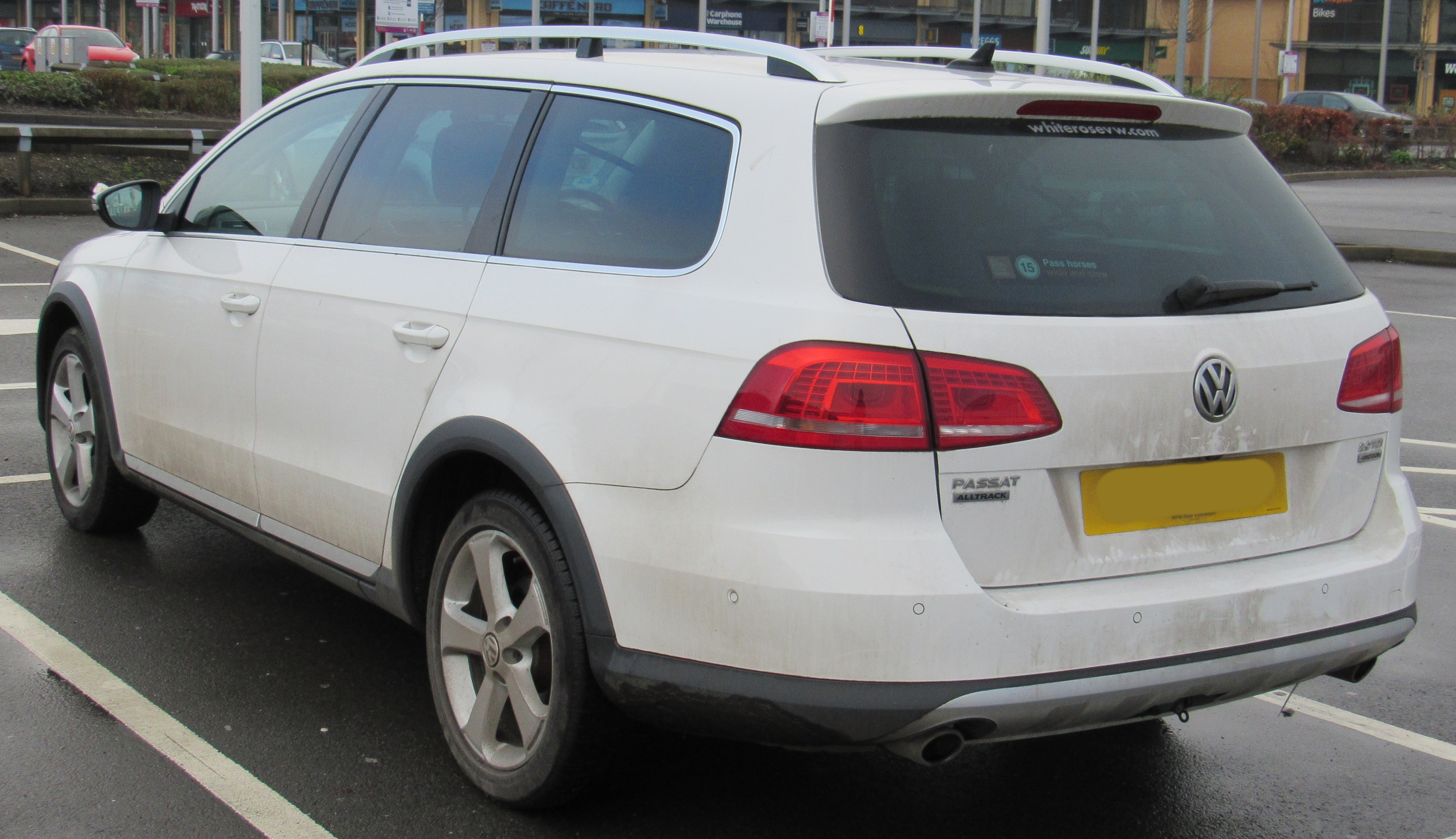
Volkswagen Passat B7 Alltrack (rear)

== B8 (Typ 3G; 2015) ==
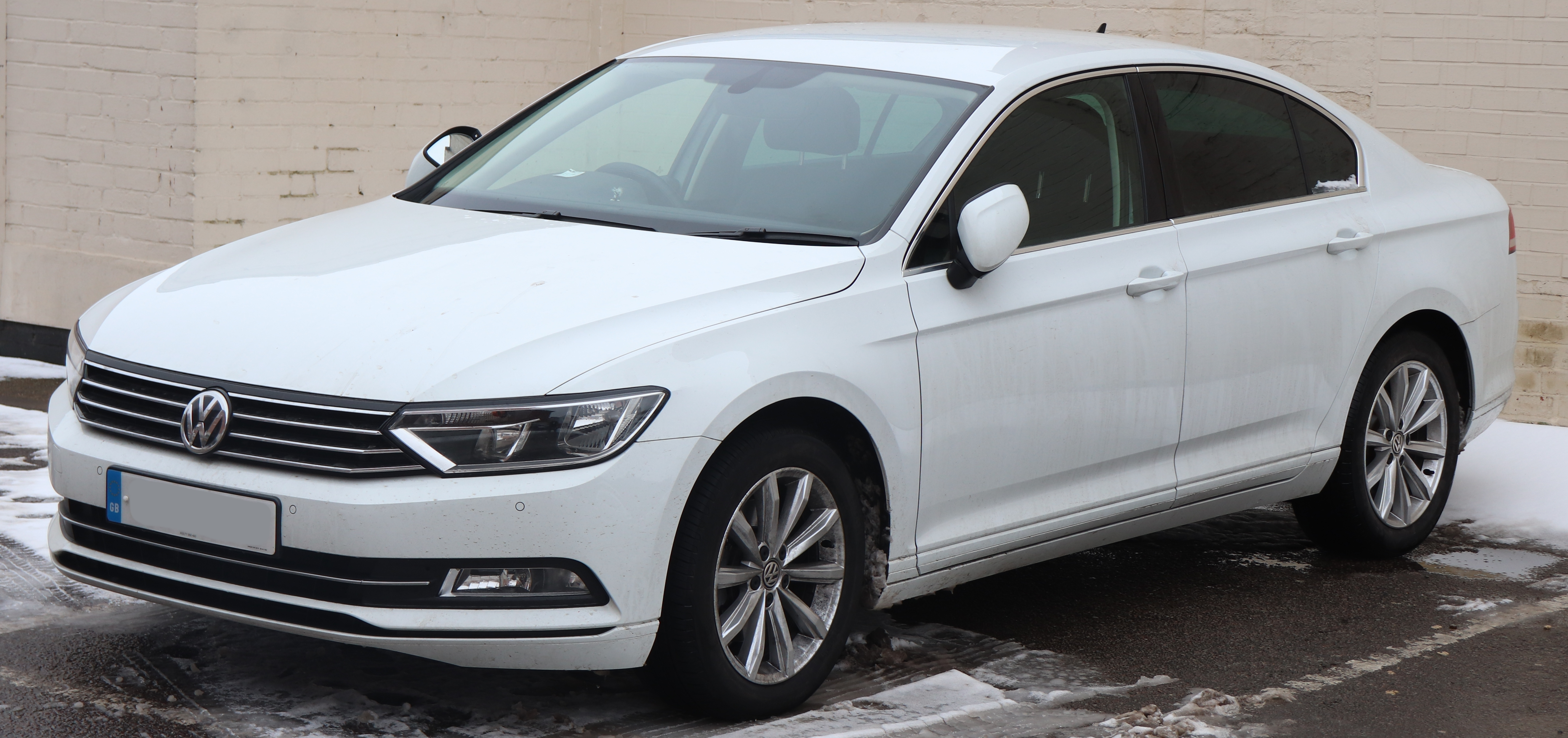
Volkswagen Passat (B8) SE Business TDi saloon

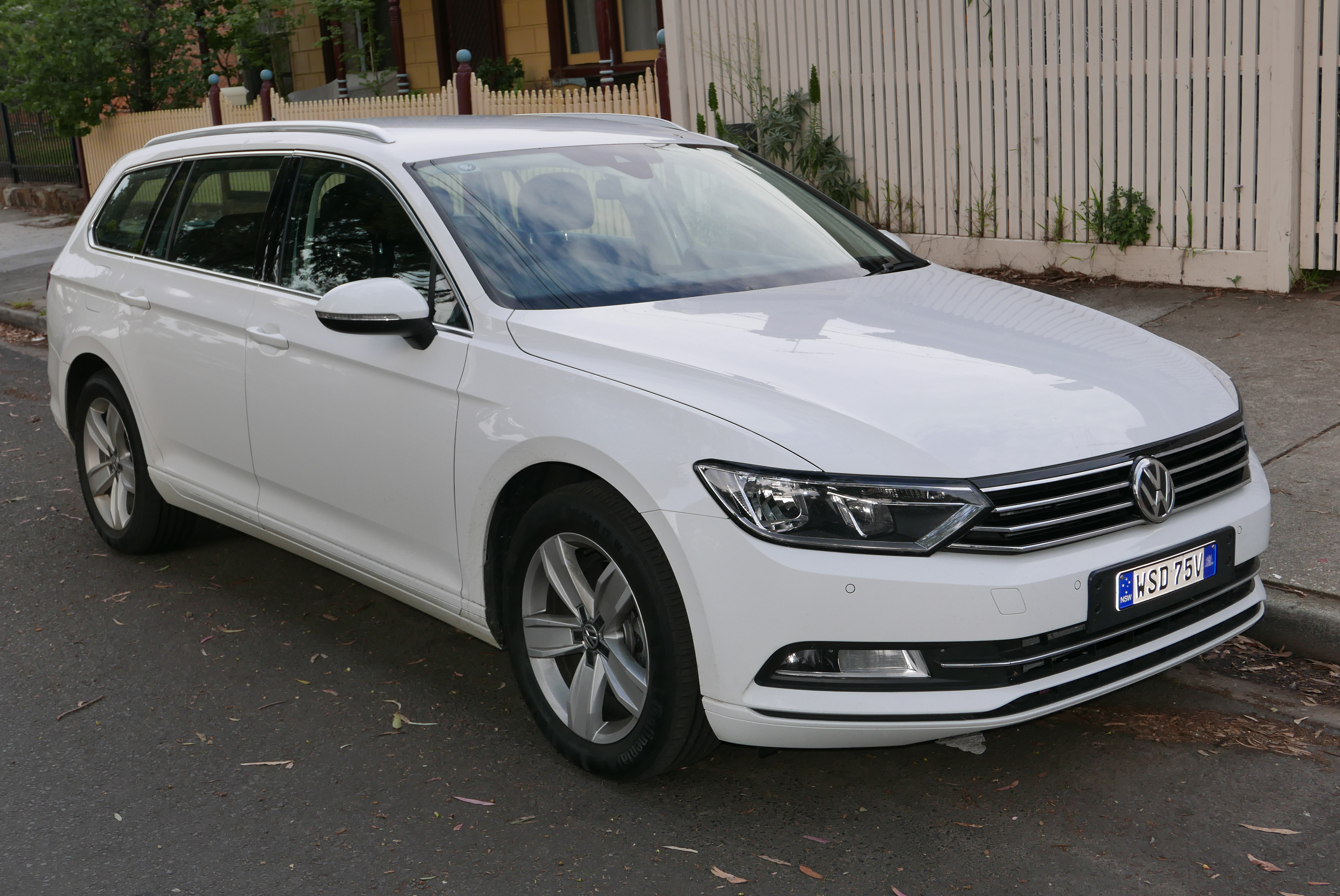
Volkswagen Passat (B8) 132 TSI estate

The eighth generation model of the Passat was unveiled on 3 July 2014, with sales commencing in November 2014 in Continental Europe and in January 2015 in the United Kingdom as a four-door saloon and estate. Following other Volkswagen Group passenger vehicles such as the Volkswagen Golf Mk7, it is based on the MQB platform, a modular automobile construction platform designed for transverse, front-engined cars.

The Passat B8 continued to be sold in China under the name Magotan; this version has an 80 mm longer wheelbase.

== B9 (Typ 3J; 2023) ==
The ninth-generation Passat is available strictly as an estate (Variant) except for China, where it is also available as a saloon. It was unveiled on 31 August 2023 and made its official debut at the 2023 Munich Motor Show; it is based on the revised version of the MQB Evo platform and is assembled in Slovakia instead of Germany alongside the Škoda Superb that it is based on.

The Magotan saloon from the FAW-Volkswagen Chinese joint venture was unveiled on 25 April 2024 at the 2024 Beijing Auto Show, being based on the same MQB Evo platform as the B9 Passat Variant sold globally.

The Passat Pro saloon from the SAIC Volkswagen Chinese joint venture is also based on the same MQB Evo platform as the B9 Passat Variant and was released in September 2024. Compared to the Magotan, the Passat Pro features a different front fascia that is borrowed from the Passat Variant and is 16 mm (1.6 cm) shorter in length.

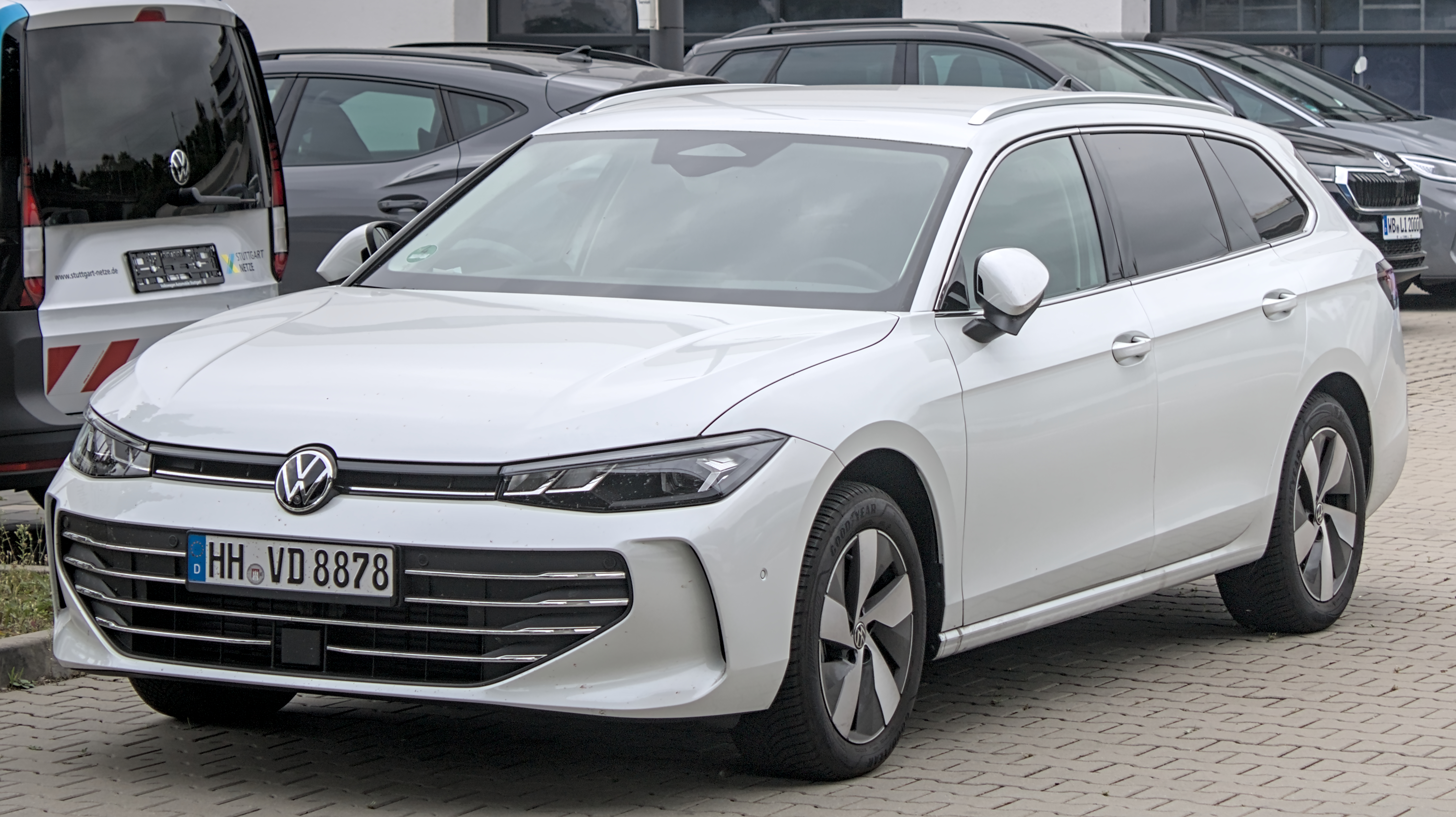
Volkswagen Passat Variant (B9)

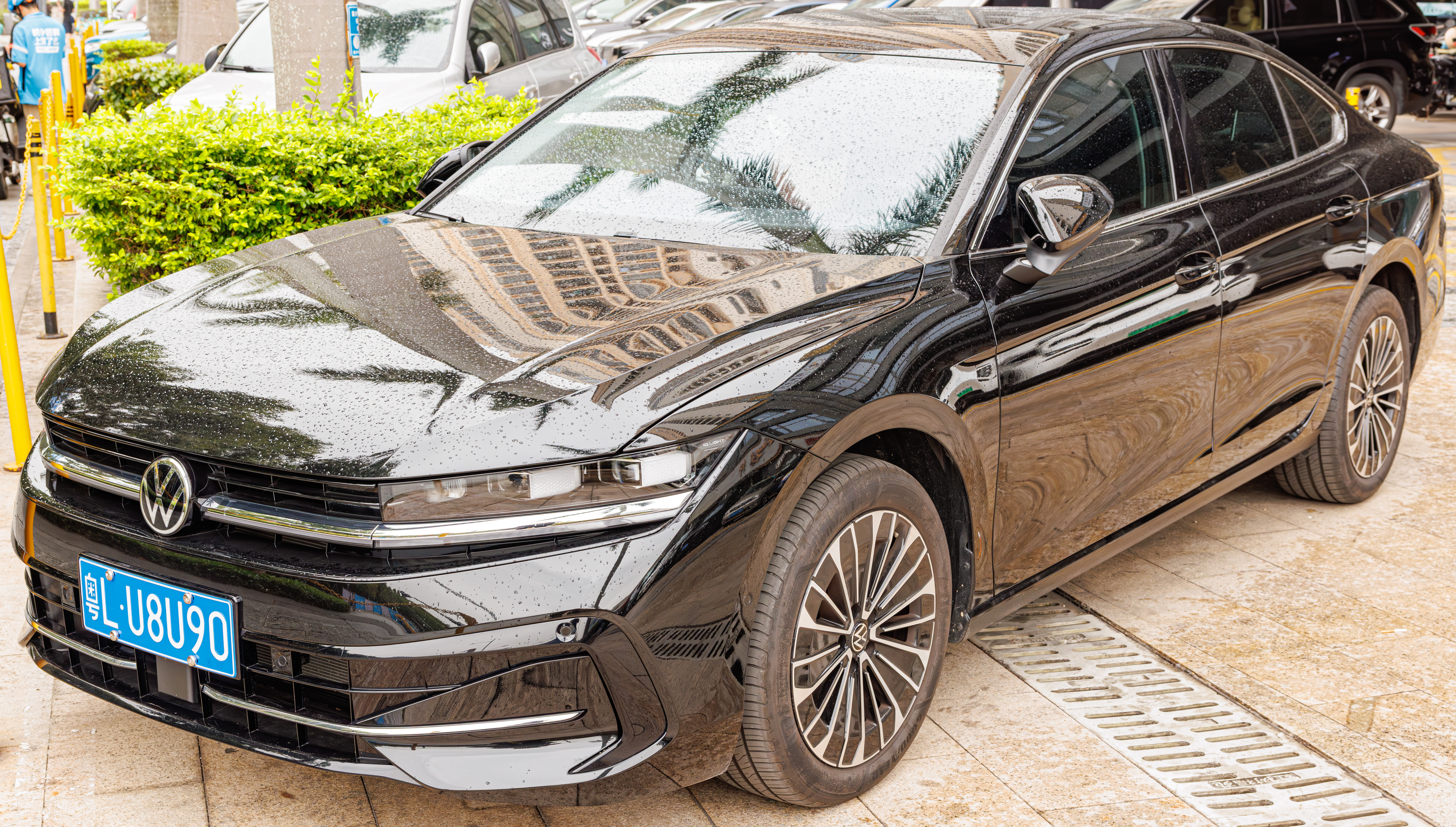
Volkswagen Magotan (B9)

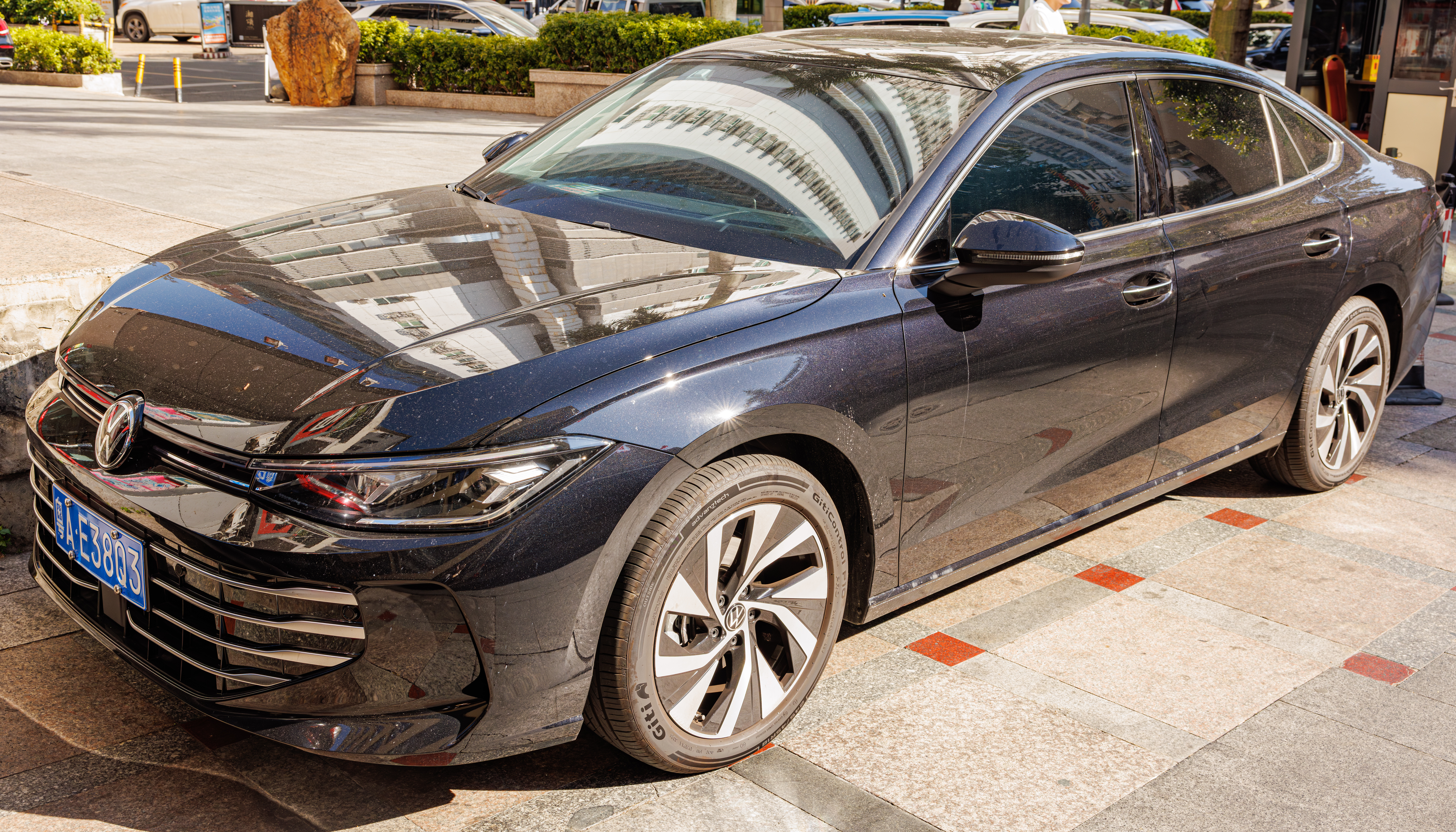
Volkswagen Passat Pro (B9)

== Other versions ==
=== Passat Lingyu (China, 2005–2011) ===
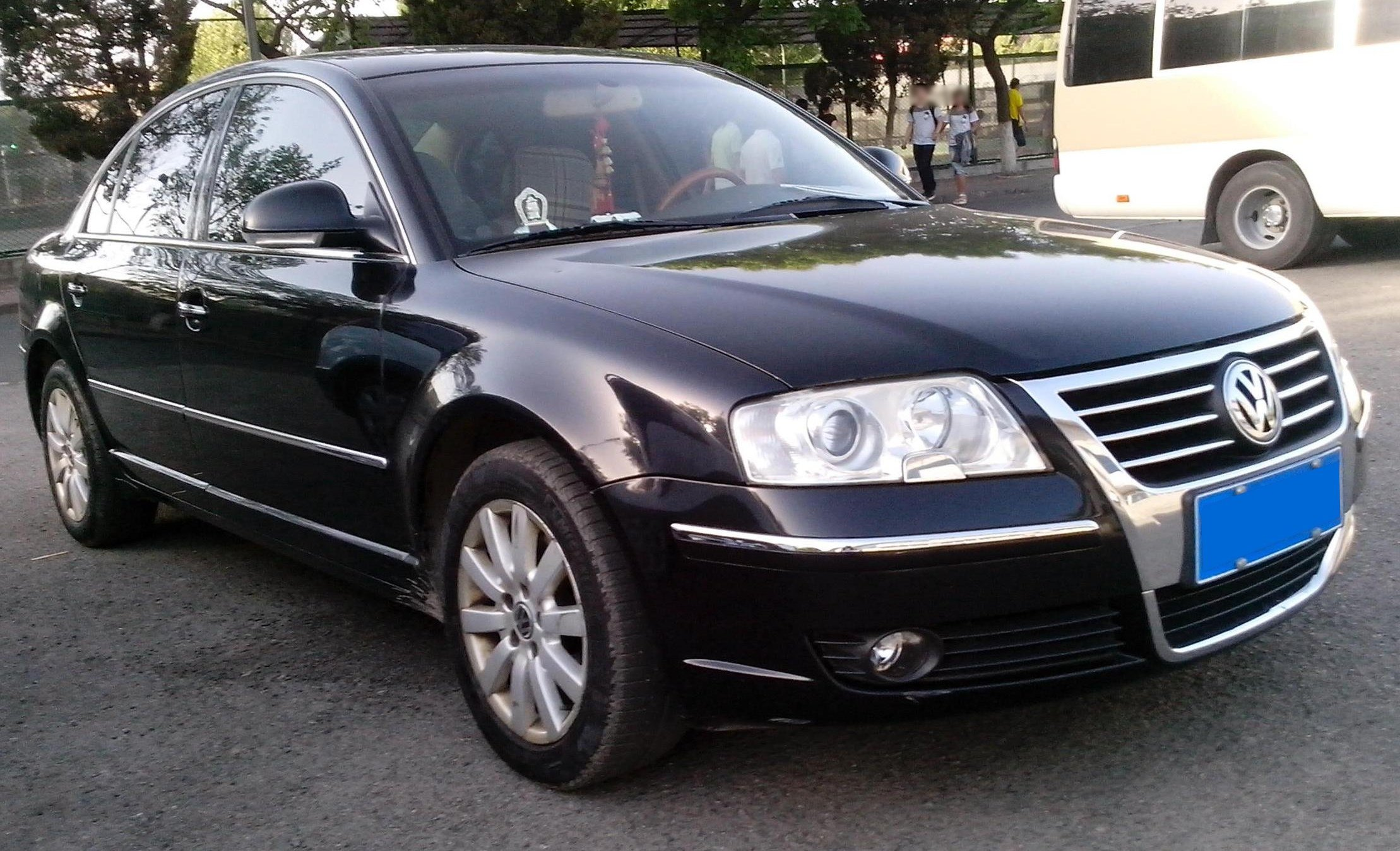
Volkswagen Passat Lingyu (pre-facelift)

The Passat Lingyu is a restyled version of the first generation Škoda Superb for the Chinese market. Manufactured by SAIC Volkswagen, the Passat Lingyu was introduced in 2005, succeeding the Passat B5. The car was designed by Istanbul-born car designer Murat Günak. In 2009, a facelifted version was introduced as the Passat New Lingyu (Xinlingyu). Production lasted until 2011 when it was replaced by the Passat NMS.

Volkswagen built 20 examples of a fuel-cell Passat Lingyu in mid-2008 to be presented at the 2008 Beijing Olympics.

=== Passat NMS (North America and China, 2011–present) ===
The Passat branched into two models starting from 2011: one marketed in Europe, right-hand drive markets, and in China as the Magotan, and the other known as the Passat NMS that is manufactured for the North American and Chinese markets. The NMS is more downscale compared to the European Passat to achieve a lower price point and penetrate the mainstream mid-size saloon market. The Passat NMS model was split again in 2019 as the Chinese version moved on to the MQB platform, while the North American model continued to use its same platform.

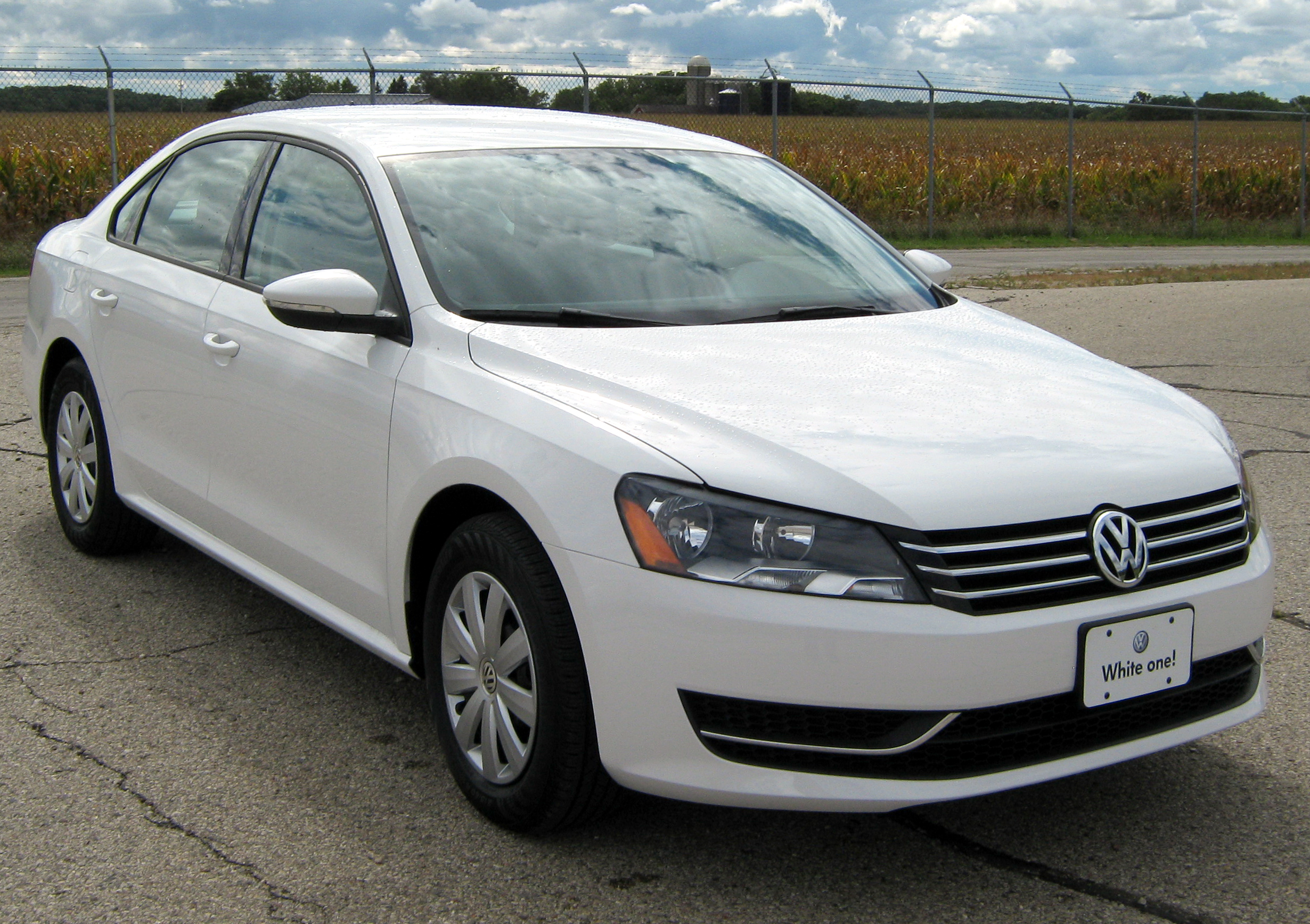
Volkswagen Passat (first generation pre-facelift, United States)

Known as the New Midsize Sedan (NMS) before its unveiling in January 2011, this model was designed for the North American market, replacing the B6 Passat saloon and estate. At its introduction, the Passat NMS was part of Volkswagen Group's strategy to sell over 800,000 vehicles per year in the North American market. The Passat NMS is marketed in North America, South Korea, the Middle East, and China, with no plans for an estate version. North American, Middle Eastern and South Korean models are manufactured at its Chattanooga Assembly Plant.

In China, the new model is built by SAIC-Volkswagen in its Nanjing factory and is marketed as a more upscale model with some interior and exterior differences to the North American model, such as a wood-trimmed steering wheel, rear air vents, and LED accented headlamps. It was sold alongside models such as the long-wheelbase version of the European Passat known as the Magotan and a B5 Passat-based Passat Lingyu.

==== Facelift (North America, 2019) ====
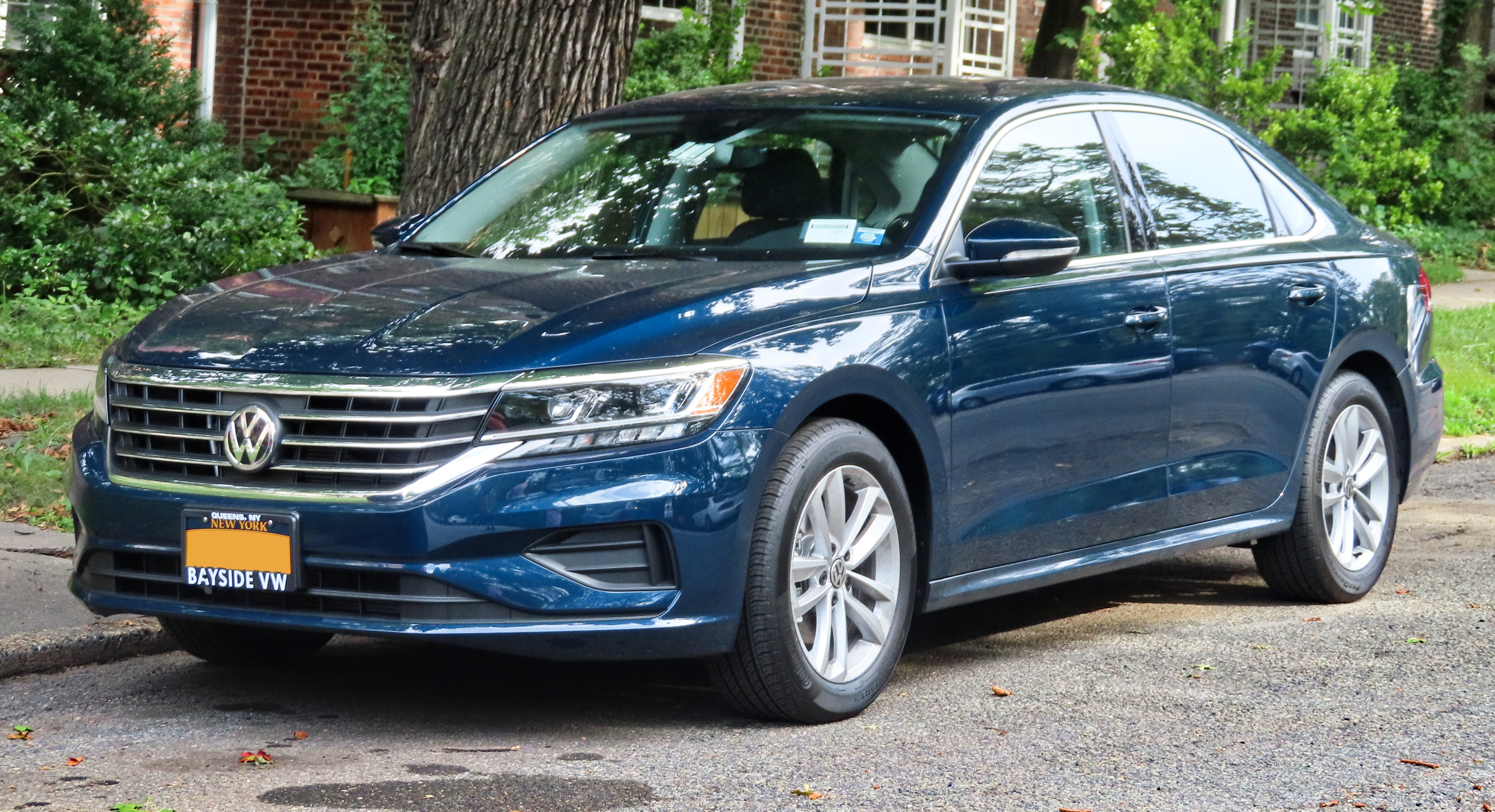
Volkswagen Passat (second generation, United States)

A revised Passat for the North American market was released in 2019 as a 2020 model. The 2020 Volkswagen Passat NMS featured revised styling and added standard safety and technology features, which include a suite of standard driver assistance technologies and a 6.33-inch glass-covered touchscreen infotainment system with next-generation VW CarNet 4G LTE in-vehicle telematics. The 2019 model features a carryover 174-horsepower, 2.0-litre TSI I4 petrol engine and six-speed automatic transmission. Following the 2022 model year, Volkswagen discontinued the Passat in North America due to slow sales.

=== Magotan (China, 2005–present) ===
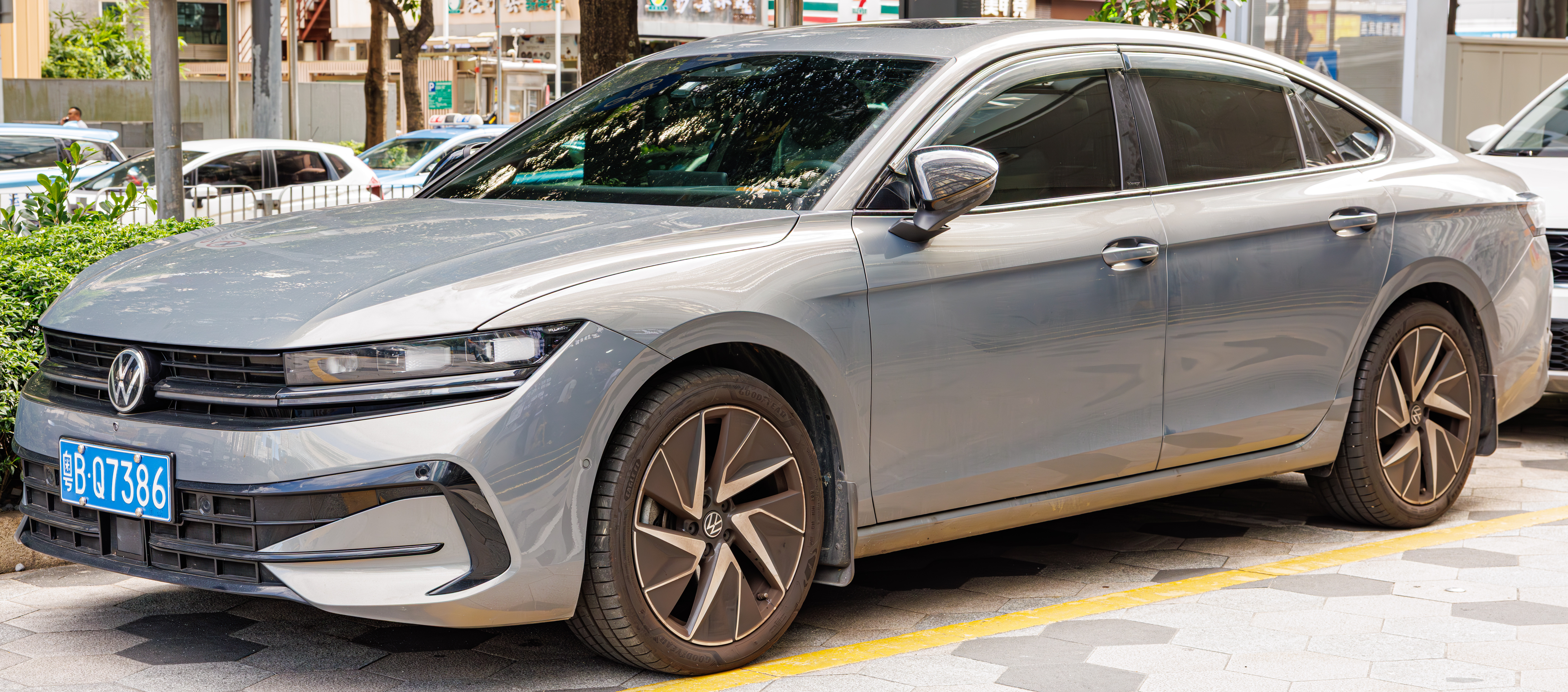
Volkswagen Magotan (2024, China)

In China, the European version of the Passat is sold as the VW Magotan from the B6 generation, produced by FAW-Volkswagen. The previous model, sold since 2024, is based on the B9 version of the European Passat, though starting in 2026, the Magotan will be sold under the Passat name in the Middle East.

=== Passat (China, 2011–present) ===
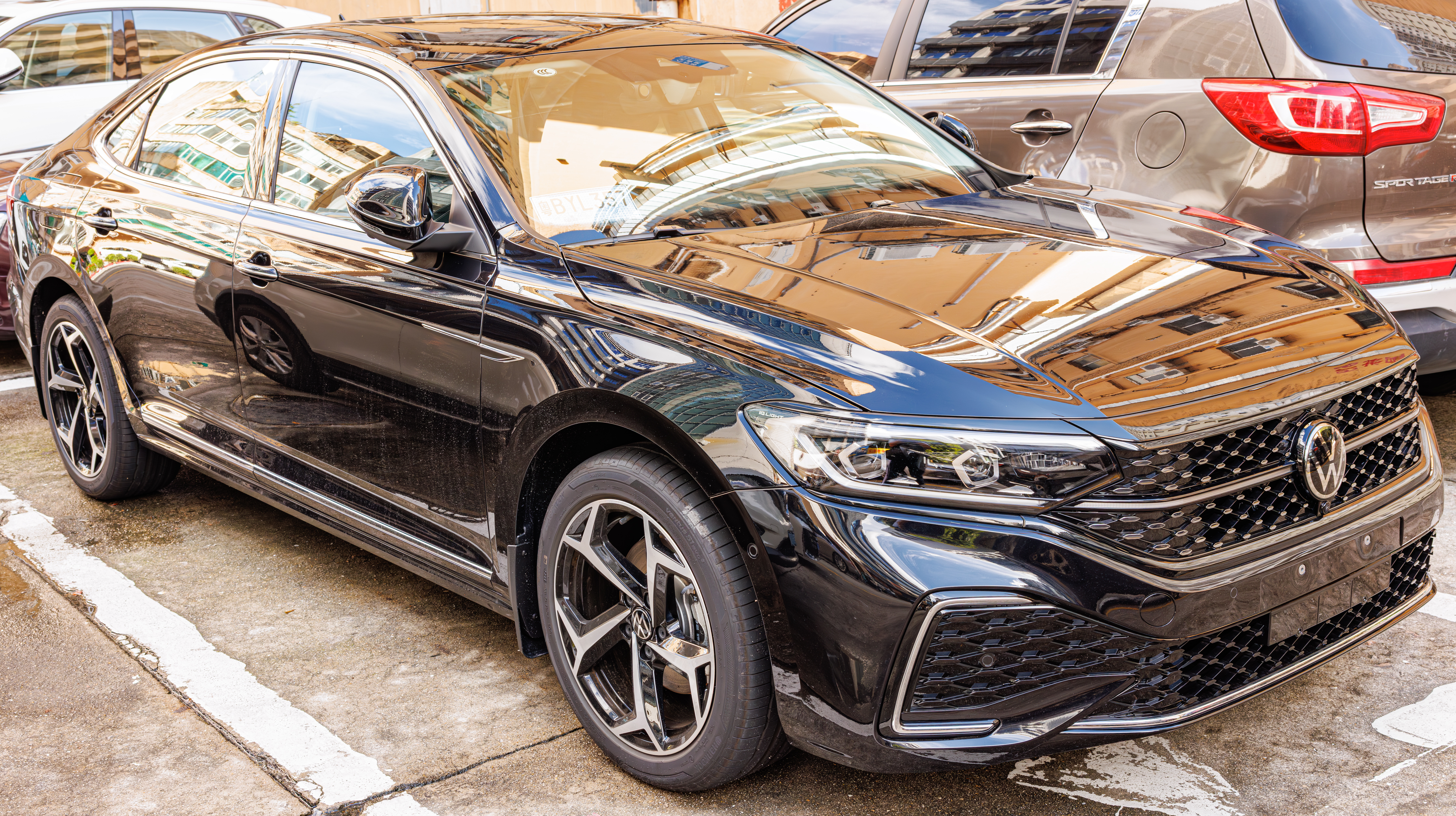
Volkswagen Passat (2019, China)

The Passat nameplate was first used in China in 2011, when SAIC Volkswagen began selling the North American Passat NMS.

In October 2018, the Chinese market 2019 Passat was unveiled, using the same Volkswagen Group MQB platform as the European Passat and VW Magotan, but it is not directly based on them. As a result, despite the high physical resemblance between the Chinese and North American Passats (and both being called Passat NMS), they have now diverged and are no longer using the same platform. The Volkswagen Magotan (China) produced by FAW-VW and Volkswagen Passat NMS (China) produced by SAIC-VW are considered to be near-equivalents, using the same MQB platform and an identical wheelbase of 2871mm, but with slightly different dimensions and different styling. The latest generation based on the B9 version of the European Passat will be launched in 2024.

Trim levels are known as the 280TSI, 330TSI and 380TSI. 280TSI models receive the 1.4-litre EA211 engine, while 330TSI and 380TSI models receive the 2.0-litre EA888 engine. All models are available with a 7-speed DSG gearbox as standard.

== Sales ==
Year	Europe	U.S.	China			
Year	Europe	U.S.	Passat	Passat PHEV	Magotan	Magotan GTE
1990		17,945				
1991		15,833				
1992		12,578				
1993		11,970				
1994		11,021				
1995		14,010				
1996		19,850				
1997	275,872					
1998	348,398	39,272				
1999	323,415	68,151				
2000	260,112	84,521	30,081			
2001	332,466	95,028	64,593			
2002	286,075	96,142	70,091			
2003	259,362	76,977	122,445			
2004	227,524	67,640	74,877			
2005	272,762	49,233	70,501			
2006	331,917	54,208	114,018			
2007	301,645	37,183	164,368		26,690	
2008	236,193	30,034	100,902		52,506	
2009	177,450	11,138	113,275		67,018	
2010	158,269	12,497	130,971		78,859	
2011	235,143	22,835	165,858		89,839	
2012	194,738	117,023	233,321		173,667	
2013	156,025	109,652	227,262		187,173	
2014	153,677	96,649	218,344		207,243	
2015	226,127	78,207	205,794		155,507	
2016	206,813	73,002	188,214		171,283	
2017	183,288	60,722	160,324		216,303	
2018	154,074	41,401	179,028		228,990	
2019	124,650	14,123	214,061		169,242	
2020	115,363	22,964	145,805		170,330	
2021	82,488	24,396	124,402		147,340	
2022	65,844	2,408				
2023			185,880	13,038	176,349	13,700
2024			245,737	6,772	190,998	5,847
2025			226,195	4,393	191,957	132
