= Dacon =

Brazilian automobile manufacturer

Dacon was a Brazilian automobile manufacturer founded by Paulo de Aguiar Goulart in São Paulo in 1964 and shuttered in 1996.

== Designs ==
Dacon began as the local Porsche distributor, but after car importation was prohibited in 1976, they chose to become a Volkswagen distributor instead. In 1982 they began work on a car of their own, namely the little rear-engined Dacon 828. The name was supposed to represent the year it was begun (82) and being Dacon's eighth project, but it was also clearly chosen to remind one of the Porsche 928. Designed by Puma designer Anísio Campos, the first eleven cars were actually built at Puma's factory rather than by Dacon themselves. The little Dacon 828 used Porsche rear lights and other parts, and looked particularly like a Porsche 928 from the rear. It was sold from 1983 until July 1994, only 47 cars being sold. It was powered by a 1.6 litre VW boxer-four engine connected to a four-speed gearbox. Its 65 PS (48 kW) was enough for a top speed of 142 km/h (88 mph), and an alcohol fueled version with three more horsepower was also available.

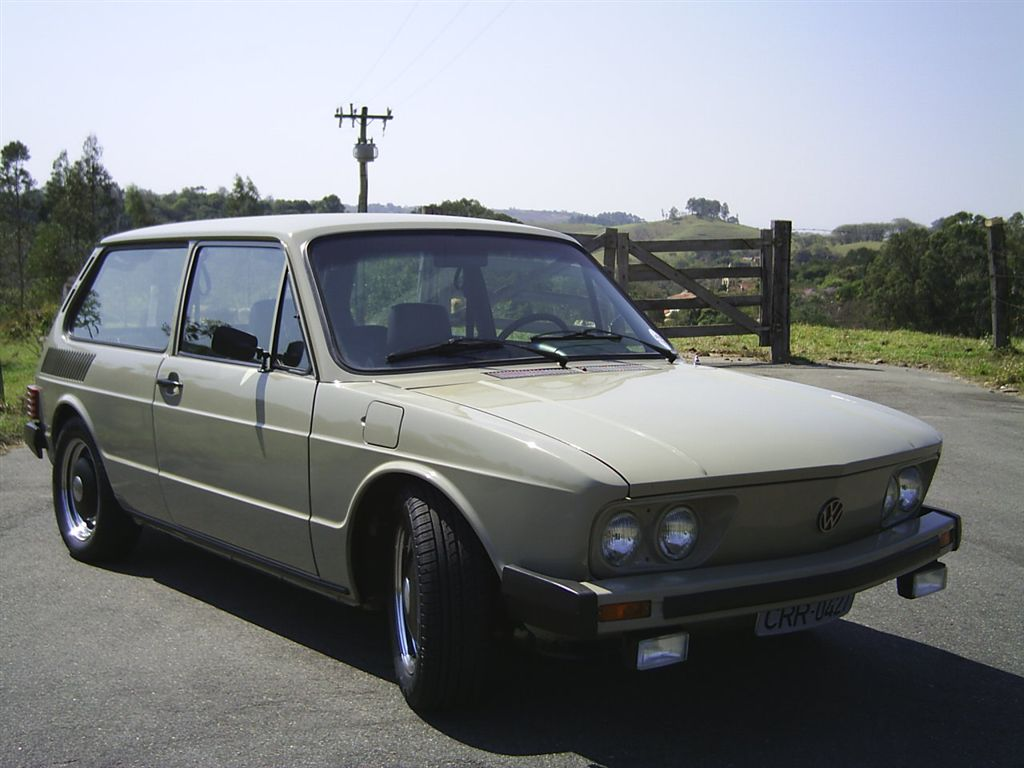
Dacon-tuned Volkswagen Brasilia

The 828 is only 2,500 mm (98 in) long, but at a width of 1,600 mm (63 in) it can easily accommodate three (rather than the two for whom it was intended). The first four cars had tiny ten-inch wheels, but after that the cars received thirteen-inch alloys similar to those used on the period Porsche 944.

Other cars built by Dacon were the 822, a targa-version of the Volkswagen Passat, as well as several cars sold under the PAG brand: the mini Nick, the Nick L, the PAG 928, and finally the PAG Chubby. Dacon also tuned various Volkswagen products such as the Brasilia, often equipping them with some Porsche parts. Inspired by a stillborn Volkswagen do Brasil project to update their Volkswagen SP2 with the water-cooled inline-four engine of the Passat TS, Dacon created such a car and called it the SP3. Due to prohibitively high costs, this experiment did not enter production, but customers could have Dacon turn their existing SP2 into an SP3. The price of the 180 km/h (112 mph) conversion alone was 100,000 cruzeiros, twenty percent more than the cost of a brand-new Puma GTE.
