= Márcio Piancastelli =

Automobile designer

- Born: September 7, 1936; Belo Horizonte, Minas Gerais, Brazil
- Died: June 18, 2015 (aged 78)
- Occupation: Automotive designer
- Notable work: Volkswagen SP2; Volkswagen Brasília

Márcio Lima Piancastelli (September 7, 1936 – June 18, 2015) was a Brazilian automobile designer known for his work at Volkswagen do Brasil, where he designed the Volkswagen SP2 and Volkswagen Brasília.

== Biography ==
Piancastelli was born in Belo Horizonte, Minas Gerais to a Catholic family of Italian descent. His father owned a furniture factory, where Márcio first showed an interest in design. He sketched cars throughout his childhood as well as futuristic cities — and later studied architecture. Piancastelli was a trained musician, and played cello, violin and double bass.

At age 26, he placed second in the Prêmio Lúcio Meira de Design Automobilístico (Lúcio Meira Award for Automotive Design) with a design for a small sports car he named the Itapuan. The judging panel included Giuseppe Farina, Brooks Stevens, Mario Fissore and Luigi Segre from Carrozzeria Ghia. He entered the same design contest again in 1966 and 1972.

Piancastelli died on June 18, 2015, at the age of 78, after a long illness. He was survived by his wife; daughter, Alessandra Iha Piancastelli Lóss; and son-in-law Marcelo Lóss.

== Career ==
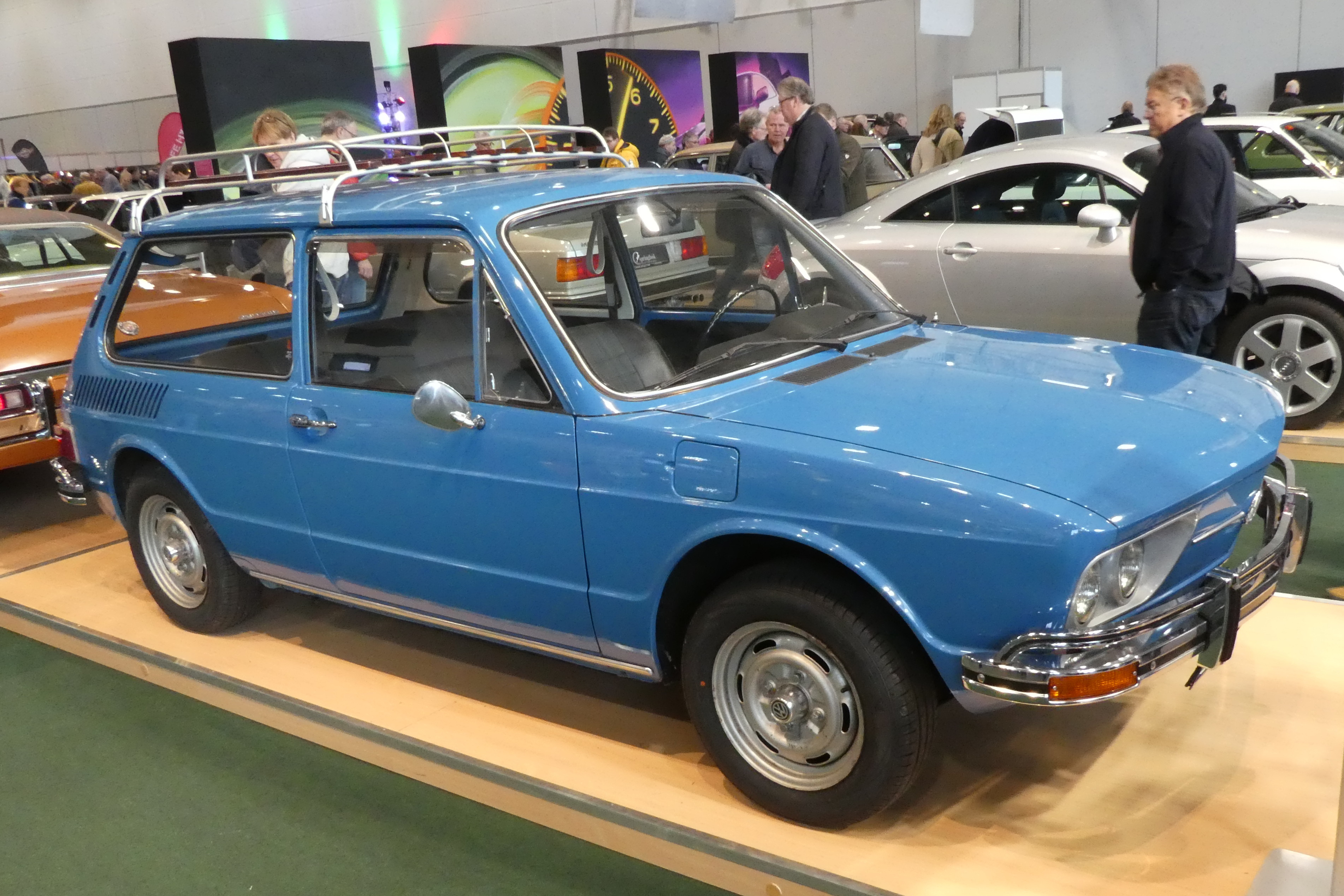
Volkswagen Brasília

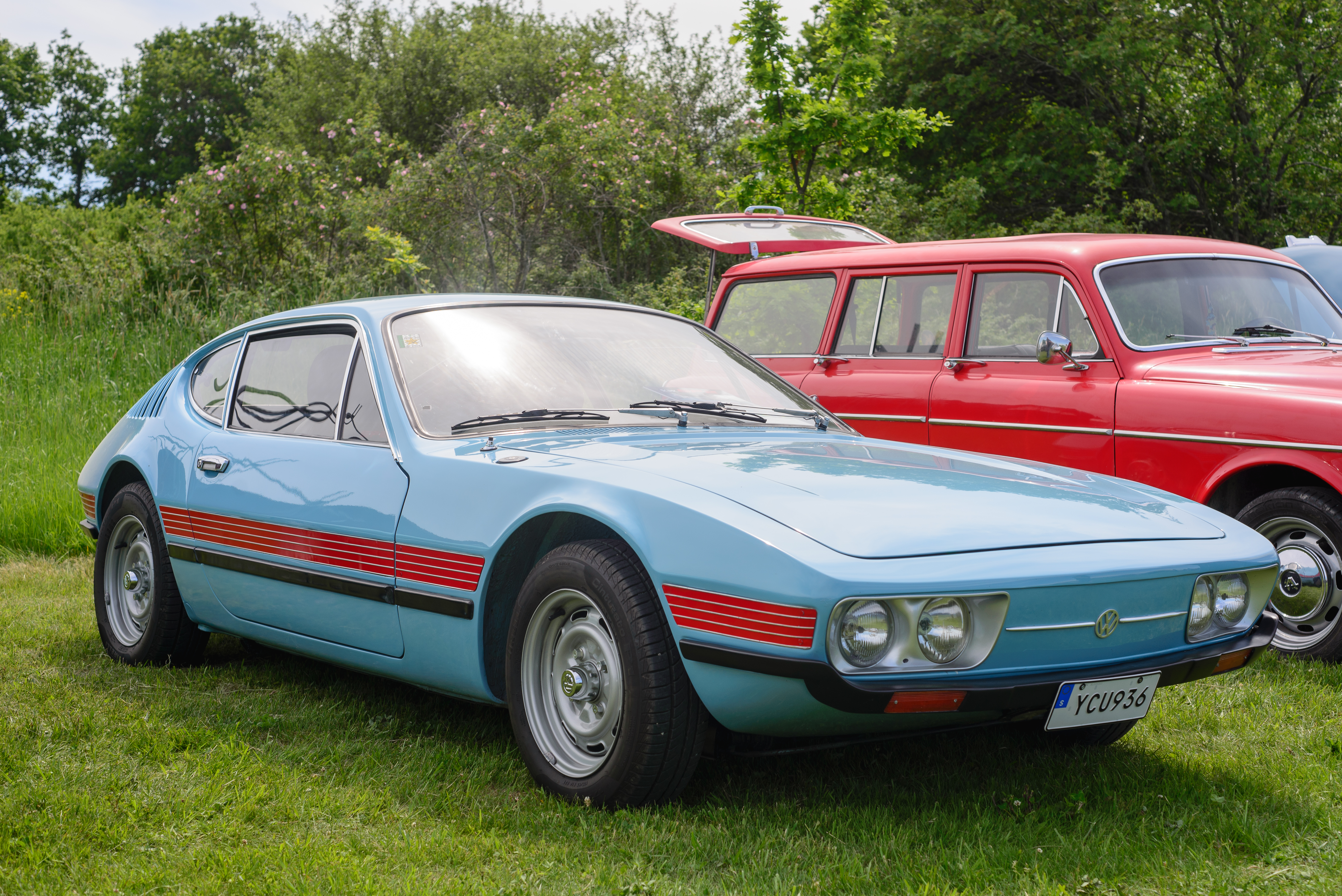
Volkswagen SP2

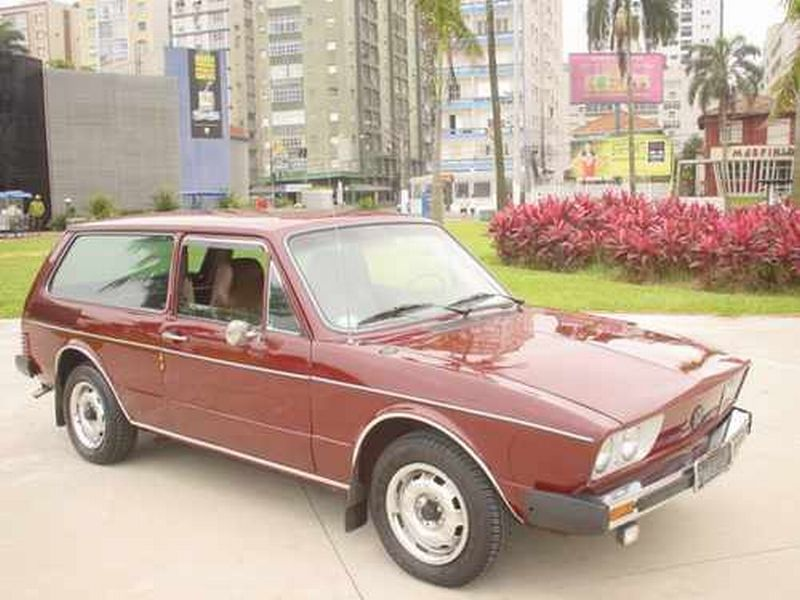
Brazilian Volkswagen Variant II

Following the Lúcio Meira design contest, Segre offered Piancastelli a one-year internship at Carrozzeria Ghia in Turin, Italy. In February 1963, Piancastelli traveled by ship to Italy.

Segre, however, died suddenly without informing his colleagues of Piancastelli's pending arrival. Piancastelli nonetheless stayed the year; learning and developing his skills; creating proposals for Ghia customers and participating in meetings with Ford, Jaguar, Borgward, Renault and Lamborghini — including one meeting with Ferruccio Lamborghini. He left at the end of 1964, after having also toured through Europe while staying with his sister in Milan.

After his internship with Ghia, Piancastelli was hired by Willys Overland Do Brasil where he worked on the development of "Project M", which became the Ford Corcel after Ford took over Willys do Brasil in 1967. Also in 1967, before Project M was finished, Piancastelli left Willys, first going to DKW-Vemag/DKW Fissori, then joining the team of the newly opened Interior department at Volkswagen when they acquired the local division of DKW.

Despite the assumption that VW do Brasil's stylists would only be refining designs from Germany, Piancastelli set out immediately to create and innovate. His first project at Volkswagen in 1969 was to facelift the Volkswagen Type 3 for the Brazilian market, earning Piancastelli a bonus from Rudolf Leiding, then head of Volkswagen do Brasil.

Under the direction of Leiding and Wilhelm Schmiemann, and working with colleagues José 'Jota' Vicente Novita Martins and Jorge Yamashita Oba, Piancastelli designed Volkswagen's answer to the Brazilian-made Puma, using Volkswagen's Brazilian Type 3 platform and a 1.6 L or 1.7 L Volkswagen engine. The results were the Volkswagen SP1 and SP2, named after the city of São Paulo. The night before the design was presented to management for final approval, Piancastelli and his colleagues reworked the model to reduce the front overhang by 10 cm (3.9 in).

Piancastelli later designed an economy car using Volkswagen Beetle mechanicals with updated bodywork. His solution, using the Karmann Ghia's widened platform and design elements from the Brooks Stevens-designed Volkswagen 412, became the Volkswagen Brasília, selling over 950,000 units in Brazil and another 180,000 internationally. The project became a favorite of Piancastelli, and he personally drove a series of Brasílias over the course of 15 years.

With the creation of Autolatina (1987-1996, a joint venture between Volkswagen do Brasil, Ford do Brasil and others), Piancastelli was able to reconnect with colleagues from Willys-Overland, as Ford had taken over the Willys-Overland business in Brazil. With the VW/Ford joint venture in place, Piancastelli created designs for VW and rebadged variants for Ford, including the VW Santana/Ford Versailles, VW Santana Quantum/Ford Royale, Ford Verona/VW Apollo.

After retiring from VW in 1992 to his home in Araçoiaba da Serra, Piancastelli continued his private design work, including home appliances. He also attended collector car events and, when requested, signed the bodywork of cars he had designed.

At the very end of his life, author Alexander Gromow arranged for a 3D renderer to meet with Piancastelli and model the Pian GT — the first design that Piancastelli had done during his internship at Carrozzeria Ghia in Turin in 1963.
