= Volkswagen SP2 =

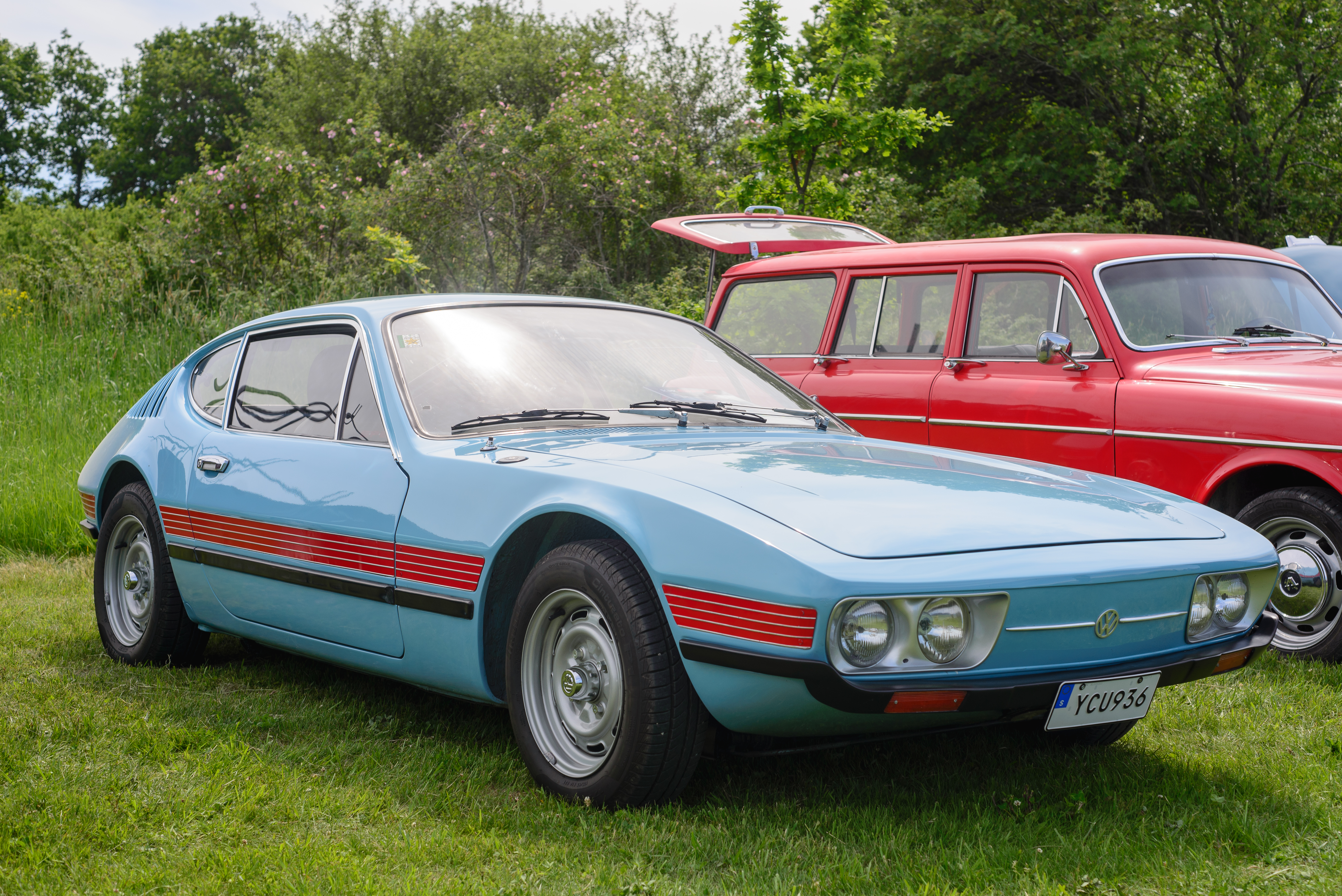

Overview
- Manufacturer: Volkswagen do Brasil
- Also called: Type 149; Volkswagen SP1
- Production: July 1972 – December 1975; 10,205 produced
- Assembly: Brazil: São Bernardo do Campo
- Designer: José Vicente Novita Martins; Márcio Piancastelli

Body and chassis
- Class: Sports car
- Body style: 2-door hatchback coupé
- Layout: Longitudinal RR
- Related: Volkswagen Variant

Powertrain
- Engine: 1.6 L air-cooled H4 (SP1); 1.7 L air-cooled H4 (SP2); 1.8 L water-cooled I4 (SP3 prototype)
- Transmission: 4-speed manual with reverse

Dimensions
- Wheelbase: 2,400 mm (94.5 in)
- Length: 4,212 mm (165.8 in)
- Width: 1,610 mm (63.4 in)
- Height: 1,158 mm (45.6 in)

Chronology
- Predecessor: Volkswagen Karmann Ghia

The Volkswagen SP2 is a sports car manufactured and marketed by Volkswagen do Brasil for the model years 1972-1975. Based on the chassis of the Brazilian market Volkswagen Type 3, its SP nameplate referred to either an initialism of São Paulo, where it was manufactured, or to sports prototype.

In 1973, German technology magazine Hobby called the SP2 the "most beautiful Volkswagen in the world".

== History ==
Beginning in August 1952, as part of efforts to spur development of an indigenous automobile industry, Brazil began enacting a series of progressively more restrictive laws that effectively closed their market to imports. The domestic manufacturers were usually divisions of larger multinational firms, and offered little in the way of sportscars, leaving local independent carmakers to fill the gap.

=== Brazilian sportscars before the SP2 ===
- From 1962 to 1966, the local division of Willys-Overland Motors produced a version of the Alpine A108 called the Willys Interlagos.
- In 1963, Italian immigrant Genaro "Rino" Malzoni unveiled his DKW GT Malzoni. In 1964, Malzoni became one of the founders of Sociedade de Automóveis Lumimari Ltda, dedicated to building increasingly refined versions of his namesake car. In 1966, the company changed its name to Puma Veículos e Motores Ltda, and unveiled their debut model, the Puma GT. While the earliest Puma GTs were powered by three cylinder, two-stroke DKW engines, Malzoni redesigned the car to use Volkswagen components when DKW announced their withdrawal from the Brazilian market. Puma went on to become Brazil's most well-known sportscar builder.
- From 1964 to 1966, Brazilian truck builder Brasinca built the 4200 GT, with an all-steel body and power from an inline six-cylinder Chevrolet engine.
- In 1966, Fábrica Nacional de Motores (FNM) released the FNM Onça, a two-door coupé designed and built by Malzoni and his company Lumimari and based on the mechanicals of the Alfa Romeo 2000 sedan. The car had a GRP body styled by designer Anísio Campos that resembled the 1964½–1966 Ford Mustang. Few were built.
- In 1968 the Adamo first appeared on a motorshow stand. Various models were built over the course of several years, with production tapering off until finally ending in 1990.
- Also in 1968 the Volkswagen-based Lorena GT was launched. Offered as a kit or assembled, only 9 bodies were completed.

The sportiest cars in Volkswagen do Brasil's lineup in the late 1960s and early 1970s were the aging, soon-to-be-retired, Volkswagen Karmann Ghia Type 14, and its Brazilian-market stable-mate, the Karmann Ghia TC.

=== Rudolf Leiding ===
Rudolf Leiding started his career with Volkswagen as a production engineer in Wolfsburg in 1945. He was later made manager of the VW plant in northern Hesse. From 1965 until 1968 he was managing director of the Auto Union plant in Ingolstadt. On 1 March 1968, Leiding took over management of Volkswagen do Brasil in São Bernardo do Campo.

=== "Projeto X" ===
It is said that Leiding became convinced that Volkswagen needed to develop a car like the SP2 when a director of the company building the Puma suggested that VW, lacking a new sportscar, feature a Puma on their stand at the 1969 Brazilian motor show.

In 1970, Leiding launched Projeto X (Project X), with the goal of developing a sportscar able to liven up Volkswagen's staid image in Brazil.

Leiding himself produced some of the earliest sketches of what became the SP2. Wanting the car to appeal to female buyers, he sought out his wife Helga's input on the design. Some consider Helga to have been the seventh member of the SP2's development team.

Designers Márcio Lima Piancastelli, José Vicente Novita Martins, and Jorge Yamashita Oba were assigned to the project. Dr. Paulo Iványi was the first lead engineer on the car, later replaced by Wilhelm Schmiemann.

The first prototype was handcrafted by Giuseppe Accasto, who had originally been sent to Brazil from Italy by Carrozzeria Fissore to handle projects for DKW-Vemag.

The resulting model study was the first Volkswagen with the "shark face" nose style, also called the "Leiding face", that appeared later on models like the German 412 and Brazilian Brasília.

The study was presented at the Feira da Indústria Alemã (German industrial fair) in São Paulo, Aréa do Parvilhão da Bienal do Parque do Ibirapuera on 24 March 1971.

Leiding returned to Germany to become head of Volkswagen's worldwide operations before the SP2 went into production.

=== Assembly ===
Two different companies and three facilities were involved in the development and production of the SP2, including:

- Volkswagen do Brasil, Factory 2 in São Paulo.
  - Design, engineering, and development of the VW SP.
  - Production-related vehicle testing on the local test track.
- Volkswagen do Brasil, Anchieta factory in São Bernardo do Campo
  - Production of all sheet metal parts.
  - Production of chassis, engines, transmissions, and axles on a dedicated production line.
  - Painting of the body shells welded at Karmann-Ghia for quality reasons.
  - Final inspection and delivery of the sports coupés for sale by Karmann-Ghia do Brasil.
- Karmann-Ghia do Brasil in São Bernardo do Campo.
  - Hand-assembly of the bodyshells from sheet metal supplied by Volkswagen on a production line shared with the Karmann Ghia TC.
  - Mounting the bodies painted at Volkswagen on the floor assemblies completed at Volkswagen, and completion of the vehicles.

=== Sales and production ===
Volkswagen's numeric designation for the SP2 is Type 149.

The first SP2 chassis made had serial number BL-000101, and was manufactured on 23 June 1972.

Both the SP1 and SP2 were officially launched on 26 June 1972. The SP2 cost 29,700 Brazilian cruzeiros, almost as much two Beetles, called the Fusca in Brazil.

Due to the car's modest engine output, a contemporary joke says that "SP" actually stood for "Sem Potência," Portuguese for "without power". Specifically, the SP2 lagged in comparison to its main domestic competitor, the Puma. Although also powered by a Volkswagen engine, it was much lighter due to its GRP body.

Volkswagen do Brasil made plans to export the SP2 to the United States, but these fell through, in part due to the car's headlamps being too low to meet US safety standards.

Despite being praised by critics for its looks, sales of the SP2 were slow. The last SP2 chassis made had serial number BL-010307, and was manufactured on 16 December 1975.

In total, 10,205 cars were built. 681 were exported, 155 of which went to Nigeria. A limited number were also exported to other countries in Latin America, the Caribbean, and the Middle East. The price of a well-preserved example today is considerably higher than other VW models of its age. The car is now a sought-after collector's item.

== Features ==
=== Body and chassis ===
The production SP2 is based on the chassis of the Brazilian VW Type 3 Variant. This is a steel backbone chassis with attached floor pans. The SP2's bodywork is also steel.

The overall shape is that of a long-nosed, two door hatchback coupé. It was the lowest car built in Brazil to that date. The SP has two trunks; a 140 L (4.9 cu ft) space under the front hood, and a 205 L (7.2 cu ft) compartment in the rear, accessible via a large hatch.

The body includes a "collision belt" that consists of the front and rear bumpers and bands of collision-resistant material down each side capped with rubber. The original design of the SP2 included energy-absorbing bumpers mounted on spring-steel "claws", a feature that was not implemented on the production cars.

The headlamps in the SP2 are quartz-halogen units.

=== Powertrain ===
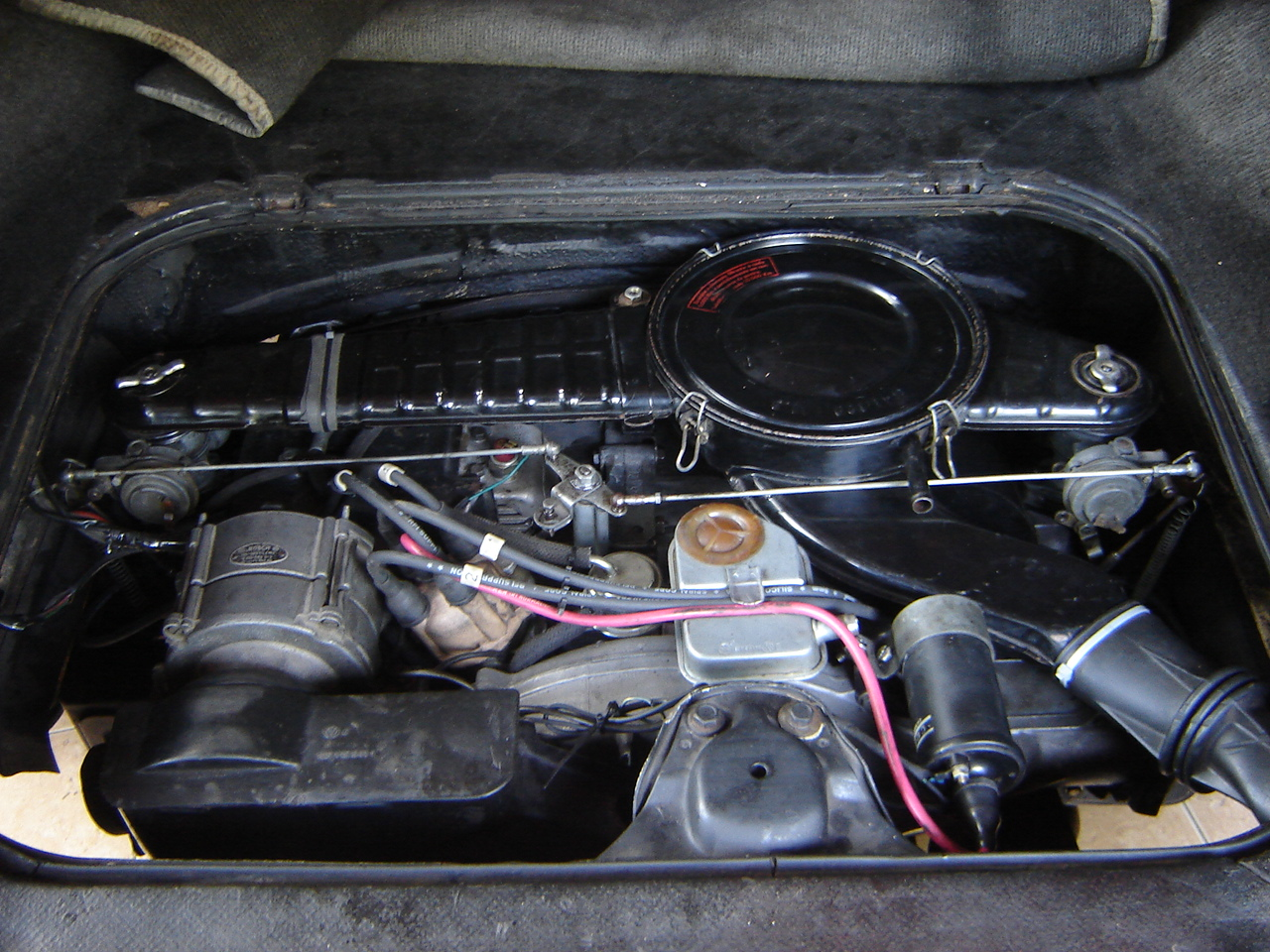
Engine compartment

Powering the SP2 is a "BL" code four-cylinder Volkswagen air-cooled engine displacing 1.7 L. This version of VW's boxer four is called the "suitcase" or "pancake" engine, and has its cooling fan on the end of the crankshaft, reducing engine height. It makes 65 (DIN) hp and gives the SP2 a top speed of 161 km/h (100 mph). The SP2 takes 17.4 seconds to accelerate to 100 km/h (62 mph).

The transaxle is a fully synchronized four-speed manual with reverse. It has the same gear ratios as the Brazilian Type 3, but a higher final drive ratio (lower numerically) to compensate for its smaller 14 in (356 mm) diameter wheels.

=== Running gear ===
The suspension fitted to the early Brazilian Type 3 chassis underpinning the SP2 differed in some significant ways from its German counterpart, and has been said to more closely resemble that of VW's EA97 series of concept cars.

The SP2's front suspension comprises upper and lower trailing arms and stabilizer bar, but in a departure from the German Type 3, the SP2's Brazilian Variant system retains the laminated transverse torsion leaf system of the Fusca, instead of the tubular torsion bars used on the German Type 3. The rear suspension is a swing axle system with transverse torsion bars, trailing arms, and a "Z bar" transverse auxiliary spring, rather than the independent rear suspension (IRS) and semi-trailing arms found on the German Type 3.

Brakes are discs in front, and drums in back. The braking system uses a dual-circuit hydraulic system.

=== Interior trim ===
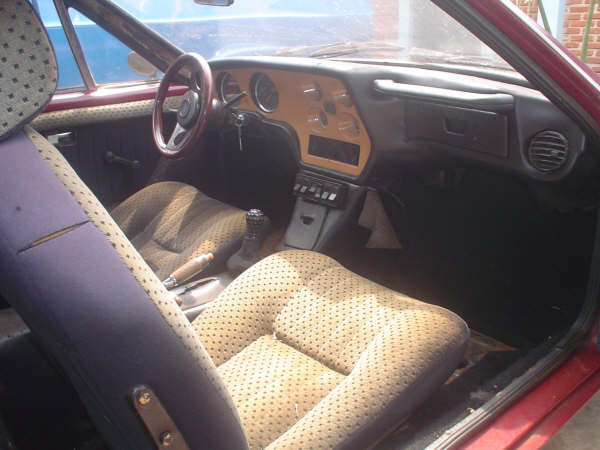
Interior

The SP2's instrumentation includes a large tachometer and a speedometer with odometer directly ahead of the driver. To the right are a fuel gauge, oil temperature gauge, ammeter and a clock.

The interior of the SP2 features a center console, map lights for driver and passenger, and 3-point non-retracting seatbelts, the first Brazilian car to include that safety feature. The seats feature adjustable headrests and backrests, and both seats and door panels could be ordered upholstered in leather. The floor behind the seats is carpeted, and includes hold-down straps for luggage.

== SP1 ==
Alongside the SP2, a less powerful, more sparsely equipped version was offered, marketed as the SP1. Fitted with a 1.6 L "BV" code boxer engine producing 40 kW (54 hp), it has a top speed of 149 km/h (93 mph). The SP1 was discontinued in July 1974 after 88 units were built.

The interior of the SP1 is more spartan than that of the SP2, with simpler seats, no leather option, and without the center console, reading lights, passenger handle, or oil temperature gauge and clock offered in the SP2.

The SP1 also makes do with sealed beam headlamps rather than the quartz-halogen units on the SP2.

== Technical data ==
| | VW SP1: | VW SP2: |
|---|---|---|
| Engine: | 4-cylinder boxer engine | |
| Displacement: | 1,585 cc (96.7 cu in) | 1,679 cc (102.5 cu in) |
| Bore × Stroke: | 85.5 mm × 69 mm (3.4 in × 2.7 in) | 88 mm × 69 mm (3.5 in × 2.7 in) |
| Maximum power: | 40 kW (53.6 hp) at 4200 rpm | 48 kW (64.4 hp) at 4600 rpm |
| Maximum torque: | 110 N⋅m (81.1 lb⋅ft) at 2600 rpm | 121 N⋅m (89.2 lb⋅ft) at 3000 rpm |
| Compression ratio: | 7.2:1 | 7.5:1 |
| Induction: | 2 downdraft Solex 32 PDSIT | 2 downdraft Solex 34 PDSIT |
| Valvetrain: | Gear-driven cam-in-block, pushrods, rocker arms, two valves per cylinder | |
| Cooling: | Air cooled (fan) | |
| Transmission: | 4-speed manual transmission with reverse | |
| Front suspension: | Upper and lower trailing arms, stabilizer bar, transverse torsion leaf springs, telescopic dampers | |
| Rear suspension: | Swing axle, trailing arms, "Z bar" transverse auxiliary spring, transverse torsion bars, telescopic dampers | |
| Brakes F/R: | 278 mm (10.9 in) disc brakes / drum brakes | |
| Steering: | Worm and roller | |
| Body: | Steel body on steel backbone chassis | |
| Track F/R: | 1,342 / 1,380 mm (52.8 / 54.3 in) | |
| Wheelbase: | 2,400 mm (94.5 in) | |
| Length: Width: Height: | 4,212 mm (165.8 in); 1,610 mm (63.4 in); 1,158 mm (45.6 in) | |
| Curb weight: | 890 kg (1,962 lb) | |
| Top speed: | 149 km/h (93 mph) | 161 km/h (100 mph) |
| 0–100 km/h (62 mph): | 16.0 seconds | 15.0 seconds |
| Fuel consumption: | 8.0 l/100 km (35.3 mpg_{‑imp}; 29.4 mpg_{‑US}) | 8.3 l/100 km (34.0 mpg_{‑imp}; 28.3 mpg_{‑US}) |

== Legacy ==
It has been suggested that the SP2 influenced the design of the Philippine DMG-VW Toro.

The SP2 is also generally believed to have been the conceptual predecessor of Volkswagen's EA425 project, which was eventually launched as the Porsche 924.

A 1973 example repainted by Volkswagen do Brasil from Astral Blue metallic to Lotus White is part of the collection of the Volkswagen AutoMuseum Foundation in Wolfsburg, and may be seen in the AutoMuseum Volkswagen.

The fortieth anniversary of the launch of the SP2 was held on December 10 and 11, 2011, in Barra Bonita. Its fiftieth anniversary was held on 26 June 2022 at the Haras Tuiuti race track in São Paulo.

== Proposed successors ==
=== Volkswagen SP3 ===
Volkswagen do Brasil did two design studies of possible SP2 successors.

One of VW's SP3 prototypes kept the same chassis and general mechanical layout of the SP2, but replaced the air-cooled engine with a rear-mounted Passat TS engine. This water-cooled 1.6 L in-line four-cylinder engine, with a compression ratio of 7.5:1 and dual carburetors, developed 85 SAE horsepower. Testing of this SP3 progressed to the point that Volkswagen planned to unveil it at the Motor Show in November 1976, but the plan was cancelled before it was shown.

VW's other concept was for a car that followed the outward appearance of the SP2 closely, but was to be built on a front-wheel drive (FWD) Volkswagen unibody platform and use a water-cooled engine. Volkswagen designer Luiz Alberto Veiga designed a new car based on the Golf platform. It progressed to the stage where quarter scale models were produced, but did not go further due to disappointing sales of the similar Scirocco in Europe.

=== Dacon SP3 ===
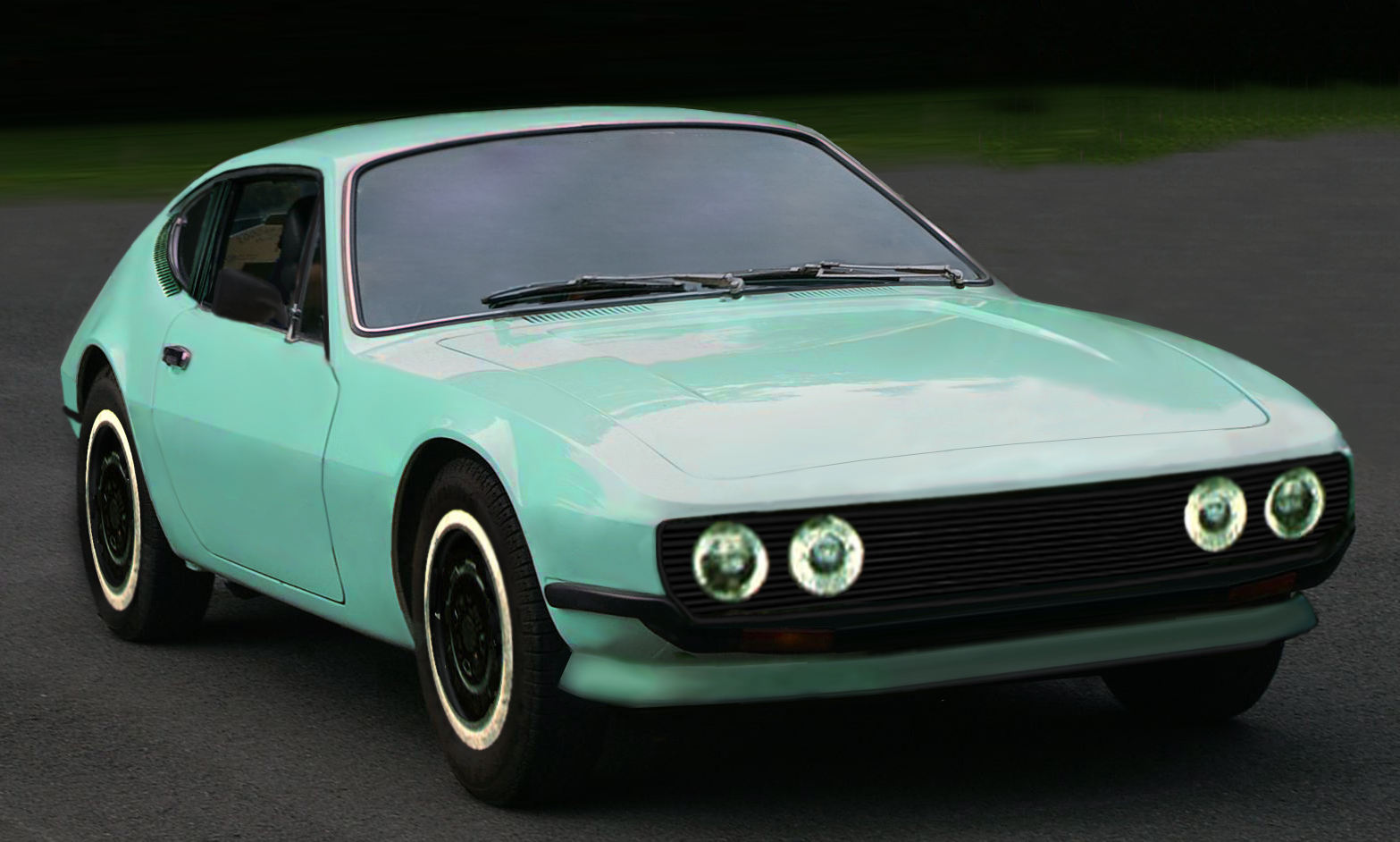
Dacon SP3 concept

The task of creating a successor to the SP2 was taken up by vehicle manufacturer Dacon S.A. in São Paulo. Dacon based its SP3 on the floor pan of the SP2, and borrowed VW's idea of using a water-cooled inline engine. Externally, the Dacon SP3 differed from the SP2 by having smooth sides without the red, wraparound side trim and black rubber protection, and by its 6J×13 rims from the VW Passat. The SP2's characteristic air intakes gave way to discrete slots on the rear side windows, and a wide black grille sat above the front bumper. The 1.8 L engine produced 100 SAE hp and remained in the rear; along with the car's air conditioning compressor, while a new radiator was mounted in the front. The interior featured leather-trimmed Porsche seats (Dacon was also a Porsche dealer until imports were banned). The transmission, suspension and brakes were the same as the SP2, but parts were adapted and reinforced to handle the new engine's greater power. The prototype reached a top speed of 180 km/h (112 mph) and was manufactured at Karmann-Ghia do Brasil. When production of the VW SP2 ended in February 1976, this also cut off the supply of chassis for Dacon's SP3 conversions. Converting a VW SP2 to a Dacon SP3 cost 20% more than a brand-new Puma GTE, and the high price severely limited demand.

=== Rosa concept ===
In 2008, designer Marcelo Rosa presented a design concept for a revived SP2 that could have been based on the contemporary Scirocco.

=== FEI College/FAAP College concept ===
In the late 2010s, a group of mechanical engineering students at Fundação Educacional Inaciana (Educational Foundation of Ignatius, or FEI College) decided to base their major project on a re-imagined SP2. The students' professor of vehicular dynamics and suspension, Ricardo Bock, was also teaching a course on automobile design at Fundação Armando Alvares Penteado (Armando Alvares Penteado Foundation, or FAAP College), and he decided to bring the two groups together on the project. The result was a design with a tubular steel chassis, unequal-length A-arm suspension at all four corners, and a mid-mounted 2.0 L turbocharged Volkswagen EA113 TFSI engine producing 195 kW (261 hp) at 6400 rpm and 475 N⋅m (350 lb⋅ft) of torque at 3500 rpm.

=== Ropond concept ===
In October 2020, Brazilian designer Diogo Ropond produced a plan for another SP2 successor. This low-slung concept was conceptually based on the Volkswagen ID. series battery electric vehicle platform.

== Gallery ==
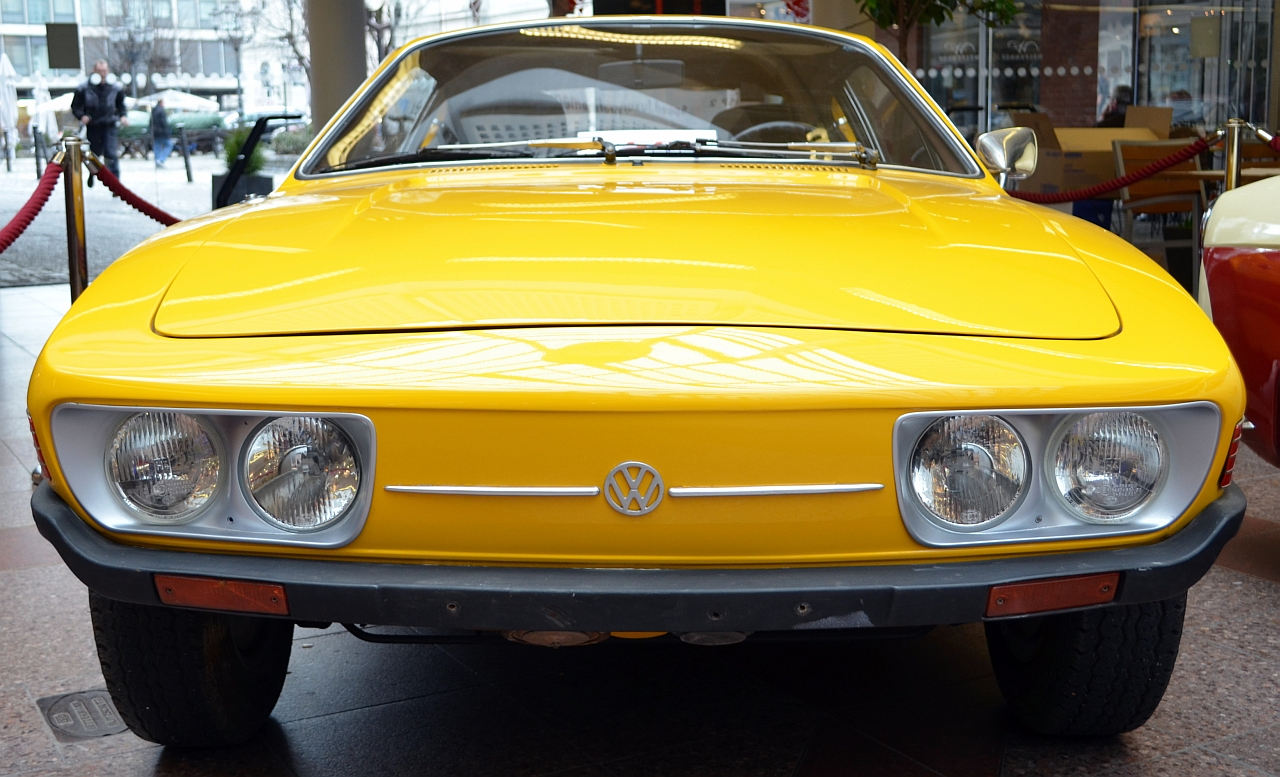
Front

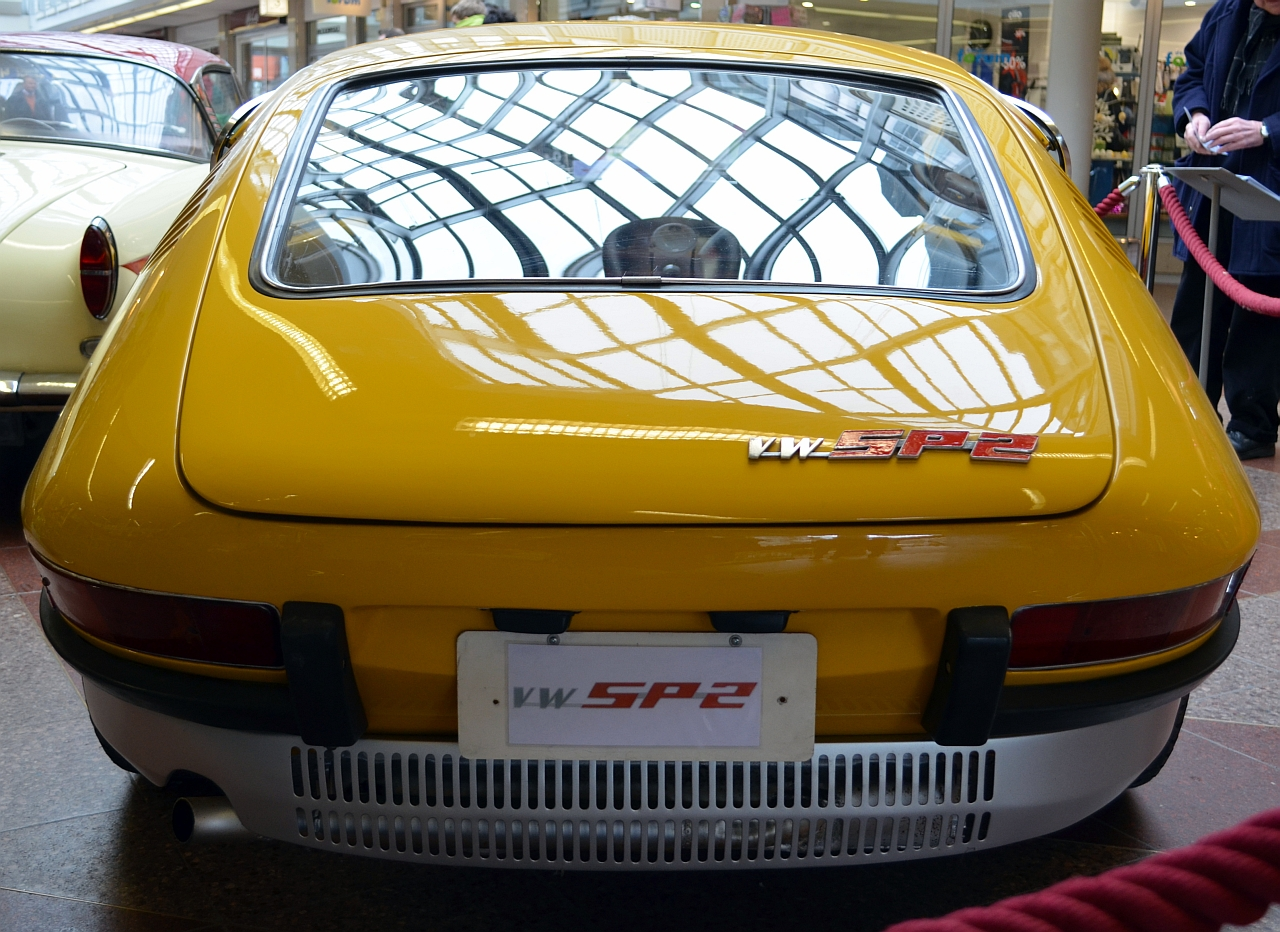
Rear

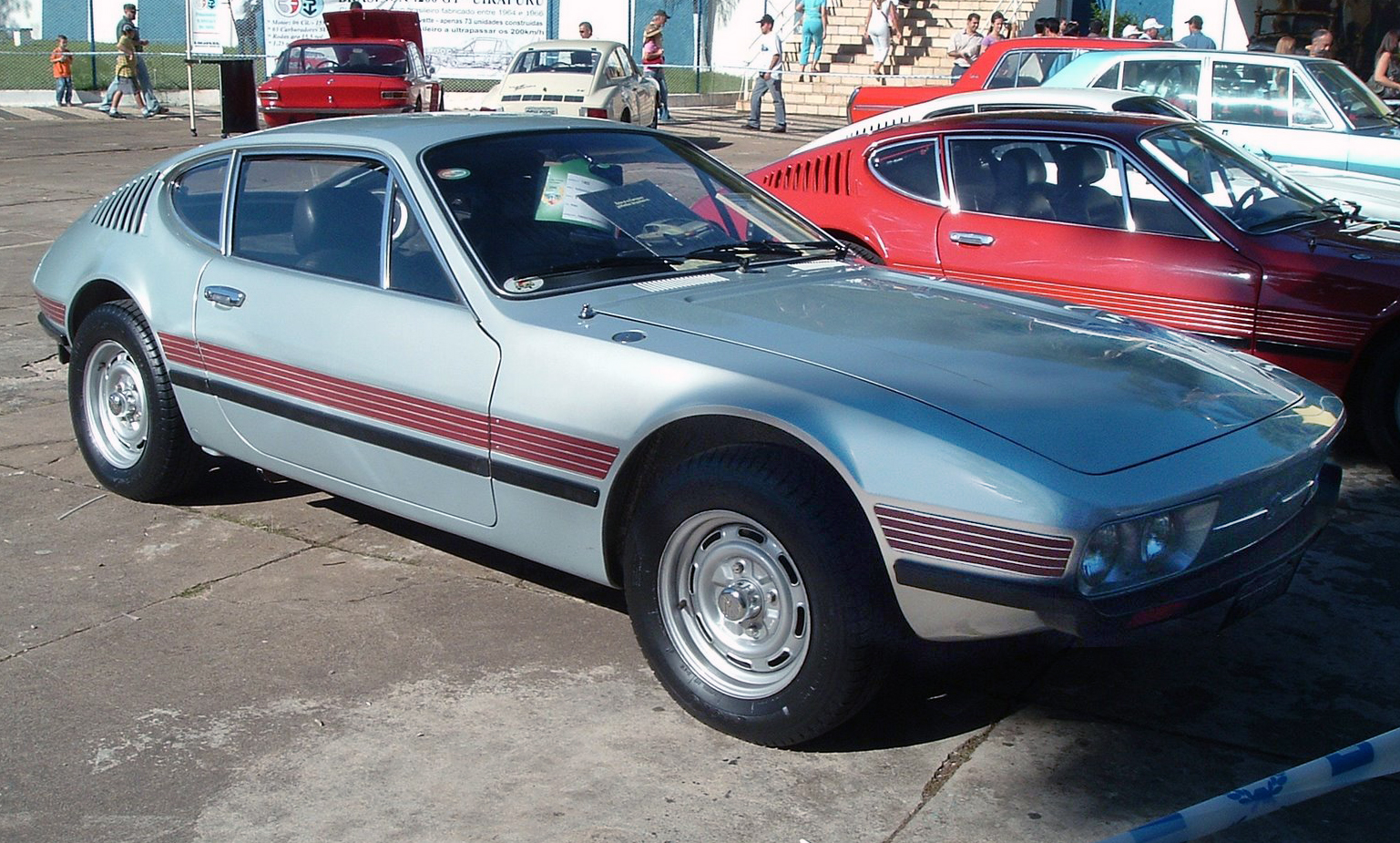
Front three-quarters

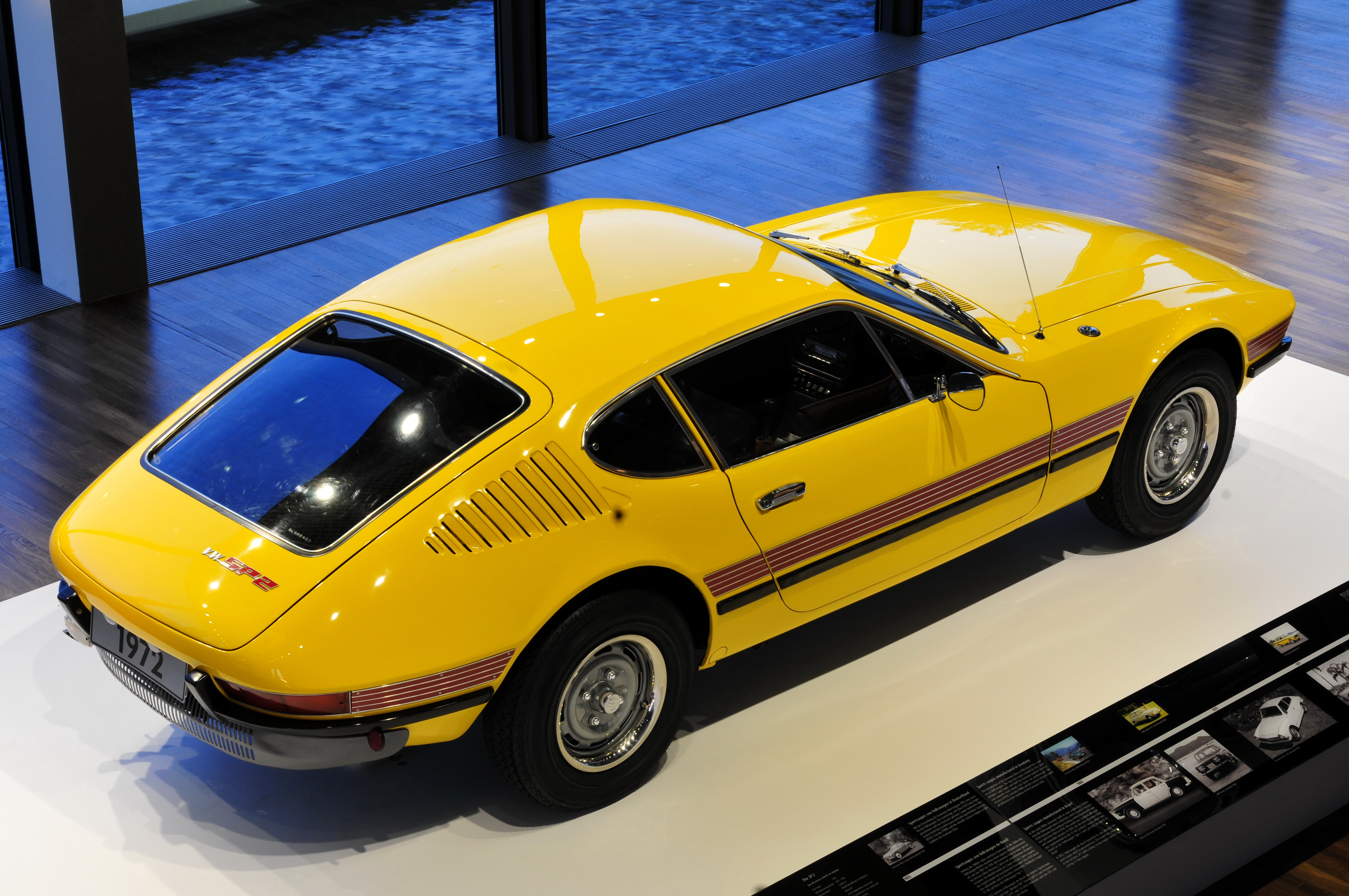
Rear three-quarters

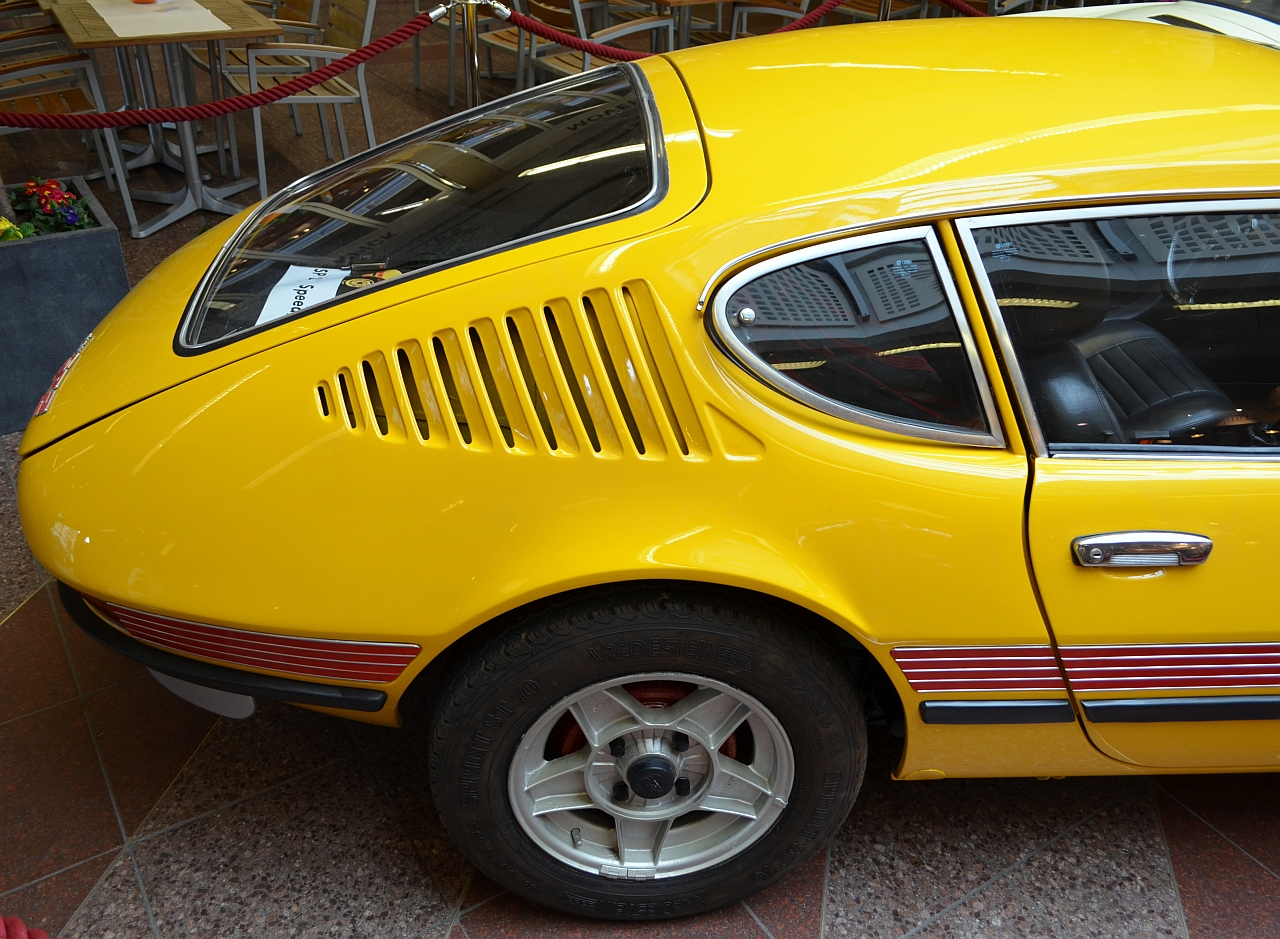
Rear side
