= PAG Automóveis =

Brazilian automobile company

PAG
- Native name: Projets d'AvantGarde Ltda
- Industry: Automotive
- Founded: São Paulo, Brazil, 1988
- Founder: Paulo de Aguiar Goulart
- Defunct: 1991
- Headquarters: São Paulo, Brazil
- Products: Car, Automotive parts

A PAG (Projets d'AvantGarde Ltda) was a small Brazilian automobile company founded by Paulo de Aguiar Goulart, owner of a famous Volkswagen concessionaire in São Paulo. The company built cars between 1988 and 1991. Its biggest hit was a car named Nick, a sport compact hatchback based on the first generation Volkswagen Gol GTi.

== Models ==
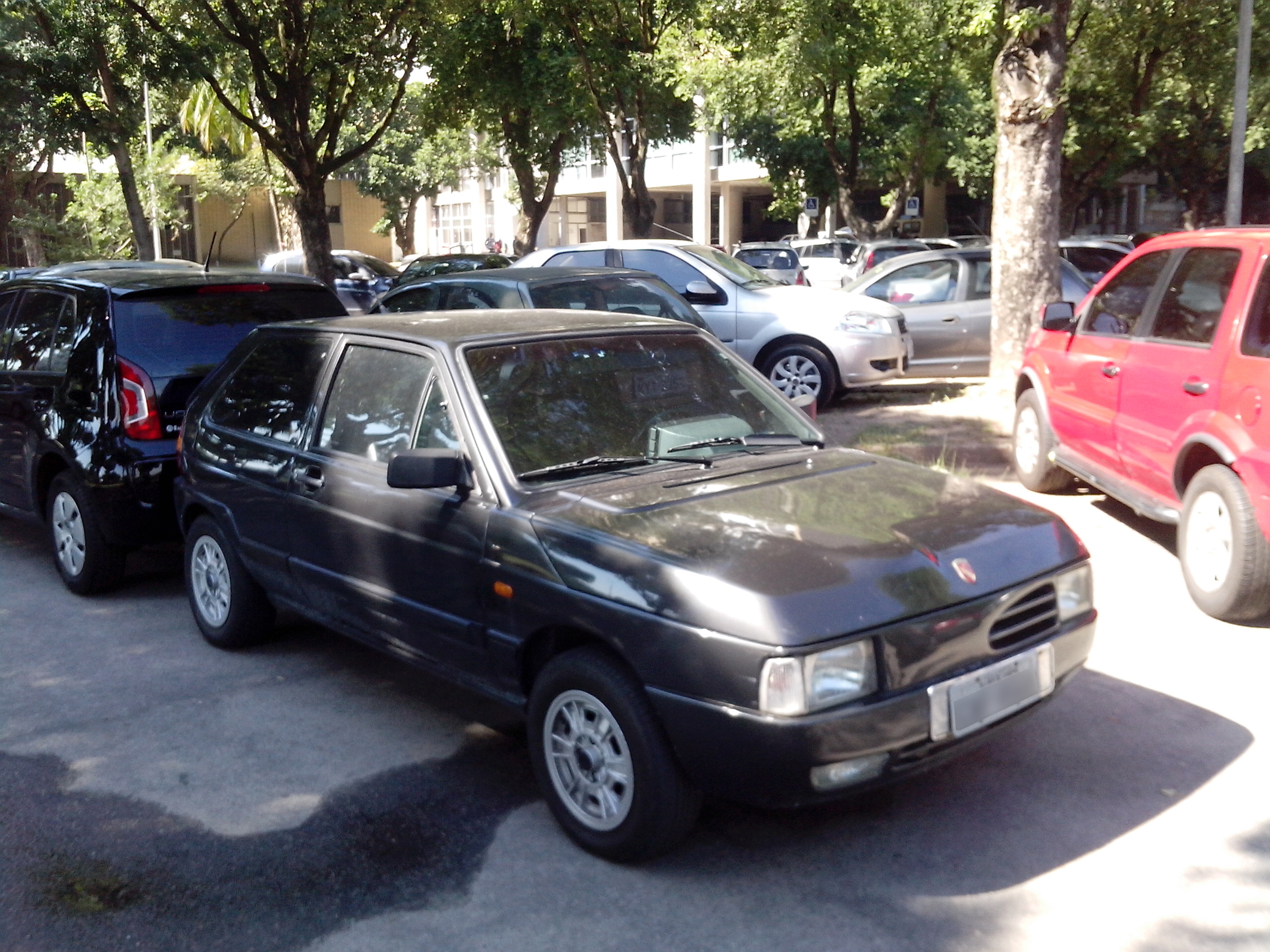
PAG Nick L

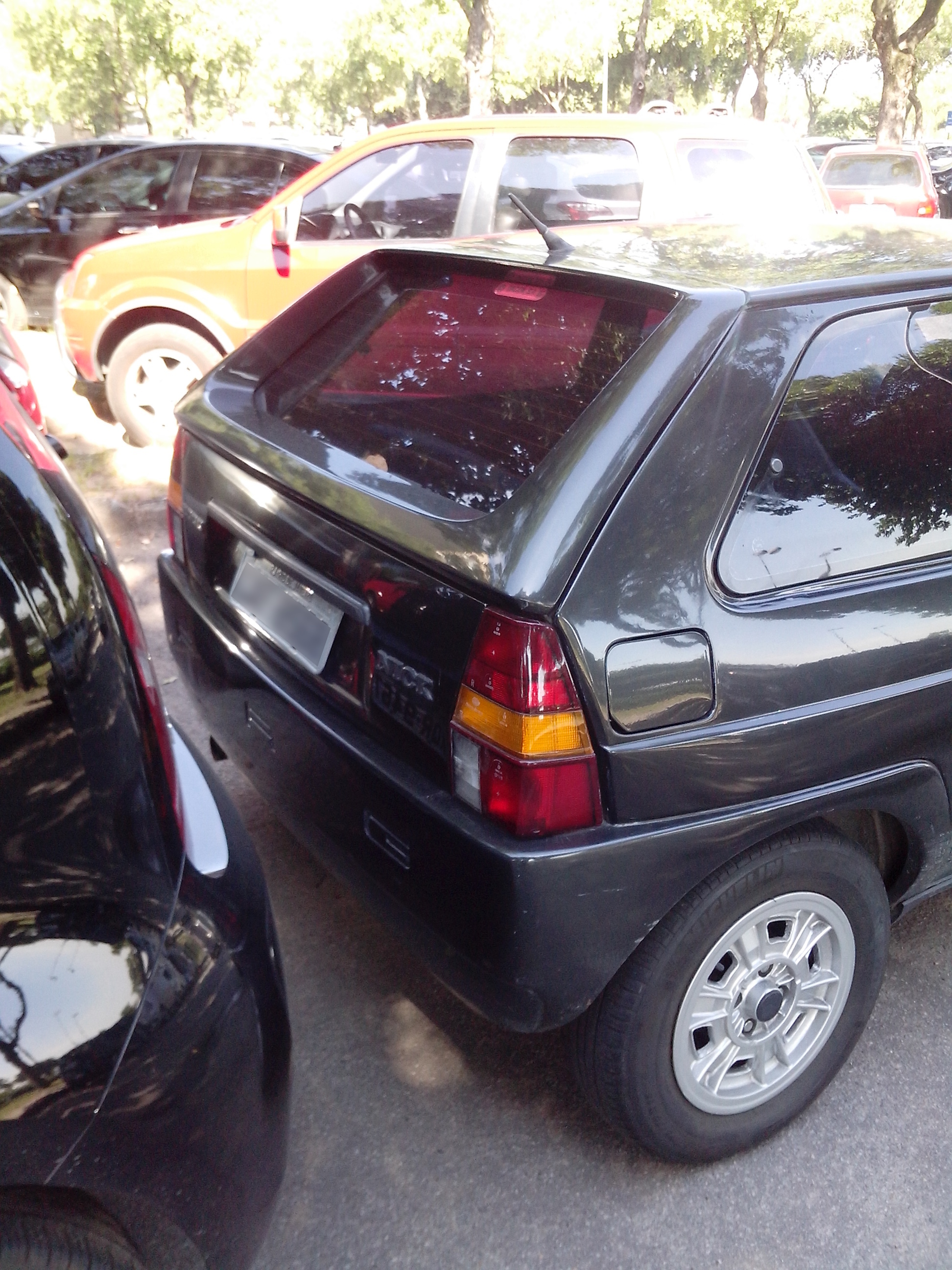
PAG Nick L rear

- PAG Nick
- PAG Nick L
- PAG 928
- PAG Chubby
