= Volkswagen do Brasil =

Brazilian subsidiary of Volkswagen Group

Volkswagen do Brasil Ltda.
- Type: Subsidiary
- Industry: Automotive
- Founded: 1953; 73 years ago
- Headquarters: São Bernardo do Campo, Brazil
- Area served: South America
- Products: Automobiles, pickup trucks, vans
- Number of employees: 22,500 (2013)
- Parent: Volkswagen Group
- Website: vw.com.br

Volkswagen do Brasil Ltda. is a subsidiary arm of Volkswagen Group, established in 1953 with local assembly of the Volkswagen Type 1, from parts imported from Germany. It produced over 20 million vehicles in Brazil having been market leader for the majority of their more-than-sixty-years in existence. Beginning in 1958, the Type 1 ("Fuscas") had a 24-year run as the number one in sales in Brazil. From 1987 until 2012, the Gol was first place in sales.

== History ==
The Volkswagen assembly plant in Brazil was established after the Brazilian government prohibited the import of fully built-up vehicles in 1953. Its first president was Friedrich Schultz-Wenk who had emigrated to Brazil in 1950 after a brief stint as a prisoner of war, followed by some time in Wolfsburg. Their first plant was in Ipiranga, São Paulo and was a strict knock-down kit operation. In two years 2268 Fuscas and 552 Kombis were assembled there by hand. After Juscelino Kubitschek's import substitution programs began taking effect as Volkswagen was compelled to open a proper factory in São Bernardo do Campo. Work on the factory began in mid-1957. Originally only the Kombi was built locally from September 1957, but from January 1959 the 1200 cc "Fusca" also entered local production, with ever-growing local parts content. In 1959, VW started production at the plant near São Paulo. Nazi war criminal and commandant of the Sobibor and Treblinka extermination camps, Franz Stangl, openly worked at the Volkswagen do Brasil São Paulo plant under his real name for 16 years following his escape to Brazil in 1951, before eventually being arrested in 1967 and sentenced to life in prison.

Since the 1970s, workers have been accusing Volkswagen do Brasil of spying on them during Brazil's military dictatorship from 1964 to 1985. The former employees put accusations on the firm of allowing its workers to be detained and tortured under Brazil's military rule. VW's security personnel informed the political police on eventual oppositional activities. In 1976, mass arrests occurred and some VW employees were tortured. In 1979, Brazilian VW workers traveled to Wolfsburg to inform the CEO in person.

In 2014, the "truth commission" convened by Brazilian President Dilma Rousseff found documents that "dozens of companies, including Volkswagen and other foreign automakers, helped the military identify union activists", including Luiz Inácio Lula da Silva. In subsequent meetings before the São Paulo state commission, VW legal counsel have denied accusations and contested there was no document proving VW had violated human rights.

In 2015, activists and former VW employees in Brazil spoke out in public, accusing the company's silence about the persecution of its workers.

In November 2016, VW commissioned a second expert review of the situation by historian Christopher Kopper of Bielefeld University, which is due end of 2017 after its "chief historian Manfred Grieger quit around the same time as Kopper was appointed." Grieger had recommended to donate a memorial for those whose human rights were violated. In the July 2017 ARD interview, former VW CEO Carl Hahn denied ever having known of security police activities. The Brazilian attorney general has been investigating. The further investigations concentrated on assumed slavery work at a so-called "Fazenda Volkswagen", a Volkswagen owned cattle farm in rural Amazonia.

== Models ==
=== Current models ===
- Volkswagen Polo Track
- Volkswagen Virtus
- Volkswagen Nivus
- Volkswagen T-Cross
- Volkswagen Taos
- Volkswagen Tera
- Volkswagen Jetta GLI
- Volkswagen Saveiro
- Volkswagen Amarok
- Volkswagen Tiguan Allspace

== Brazilian developed Volkswagens ==
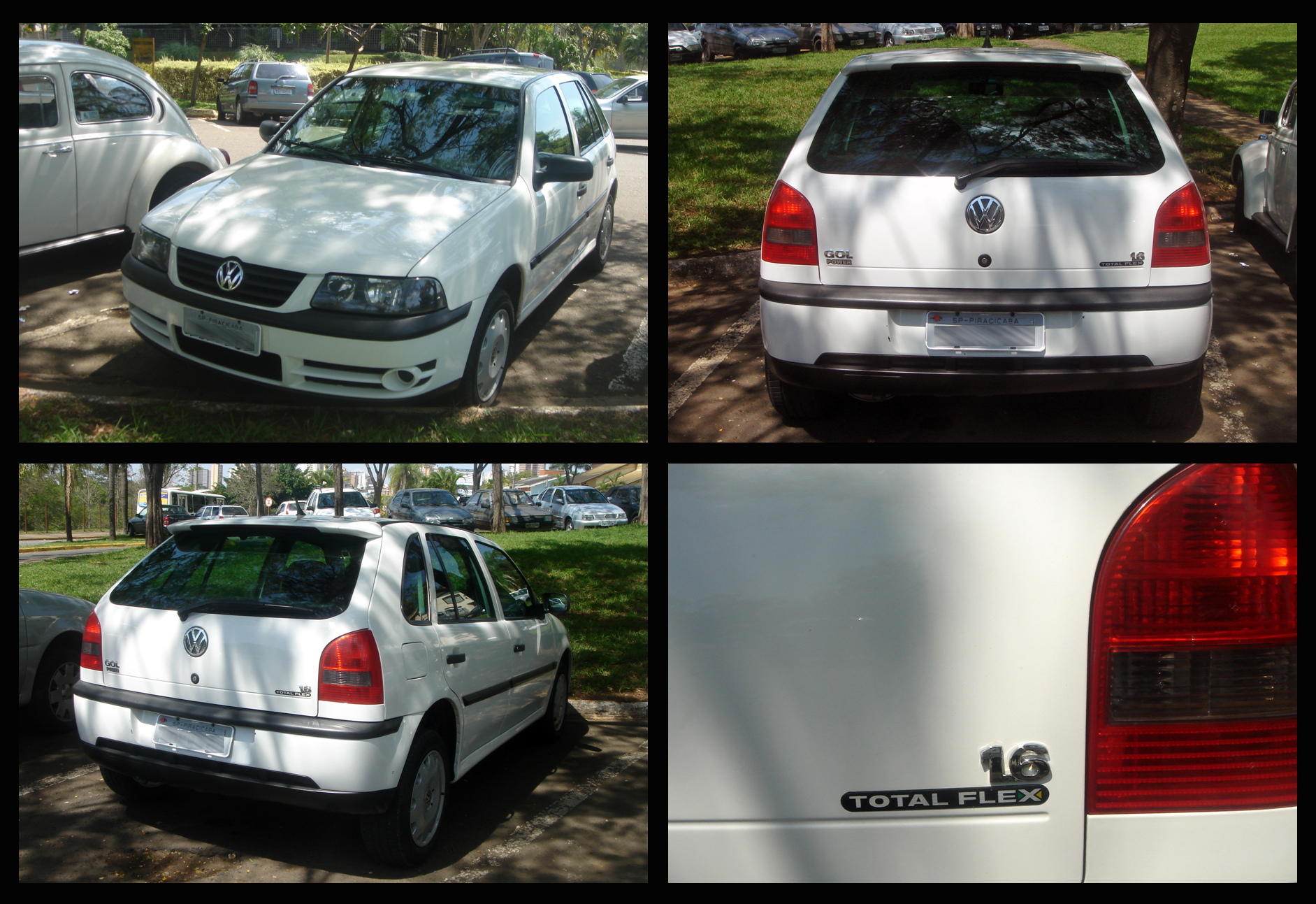
The 2003 VW Gol 1.6 Total Flex was the first full flexible-fuel vehicle launched in Brazil, capable of running on any blend of gasoline and ethanol (E100).

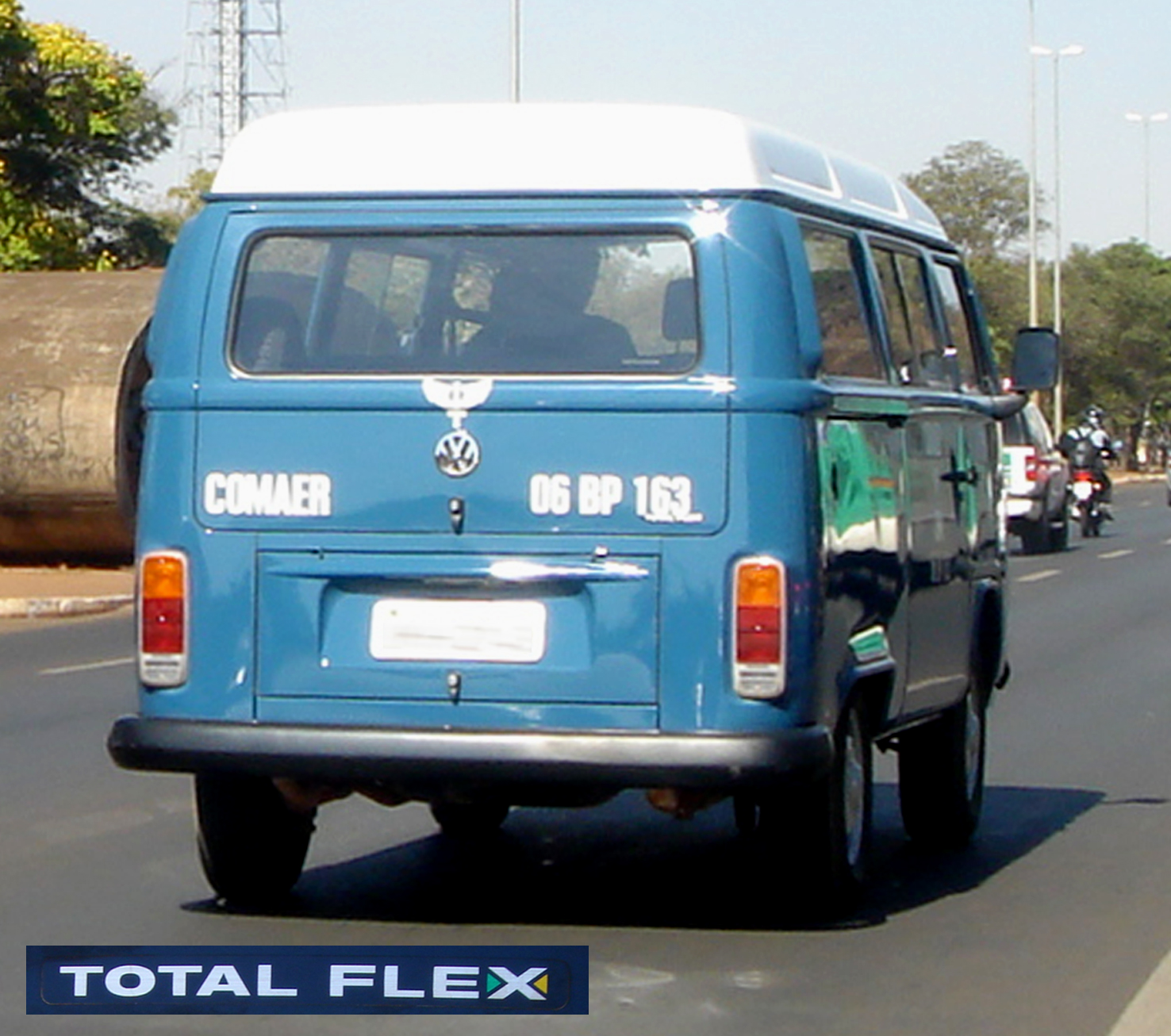
VW Type 2 TotalFlex (known as "Kombi")

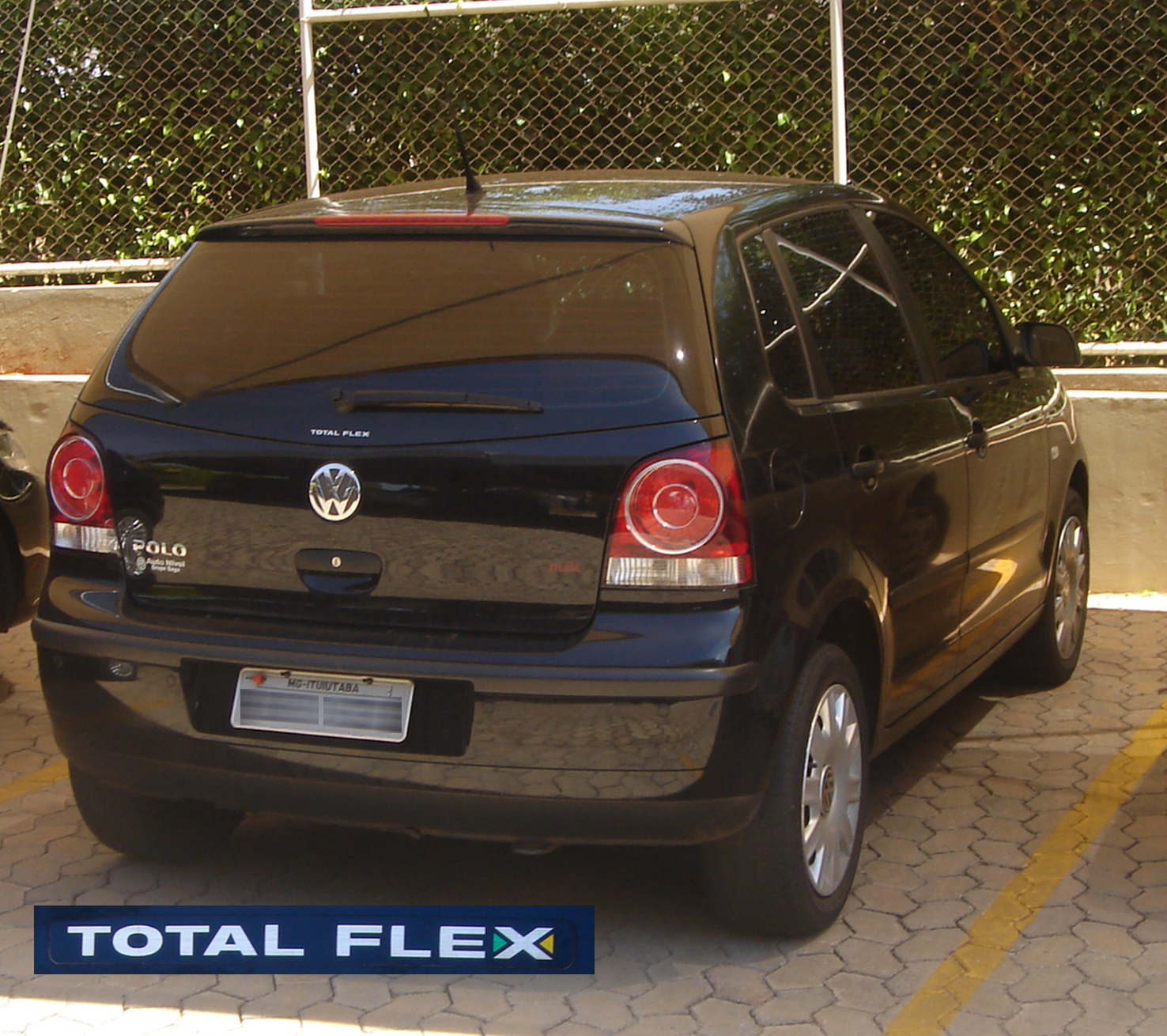
VW Polo 2 TotalFlex

By 1961, Volkswagen had surpassed Willys-Overland to become the biggest producer of vehicles in Brazil. Many models were designed especially for Brazil:

- Brasília
- SP1 & SP2
- 1500/Variant/Variant II
- Karmann Ghia TC
- Gol
- Voyage - a Gol sedan, sold as the Volkswagen Fox in North America
- Parati - a Voyage/Fox station wagon derivative
- Saveiro - a Gol pickup truck
- Fox/CrossFox/SpaceFox

From 1971 to 1975 approximately 250 Brazil "kombi" buses were produced with Special Editions, these buses had +8 sky windows, mouldings, timer clock. These buses are called "de luxe," the German name is "Samba."

After 1997 Volkswagen has been the only manufacturer to continue manufacturing ethanol powered vehicles after others withdrew.

In 2012, Volkswagen built 852,086 units (including CKD kits), making them the biggest producer in the country and second in sales. Volkswagen operates four plants, in São Bernardo do Campo, Taubaté, São José dos Pinhais, and São Carlos. The São Carlos plant only makes engines.

From 1987 to 1995, Volkswagen do Brasil's history was affected by the AutoLatina arrangement between Ford Motor Company and Volkswagen Group.

=== Trucks and buses ===
From 1979 until 1999, Volkswagen do Brasil created and developed Volkswagen Caminhões Ltda, (the Volkswagen Trucks and Buses division), after which the operation was taken over by Volkswagen Commercial Vehicles. In December 2008, it was announced that Volkswagen Trucks and Buses was to be sold to MAN.

In 1986, Volkswagen entered a deal with Paccar to sell their trucks with Peterbilt or Kenworth badging in the United States. This would allow Paccar's dealers to offer Class 7 trucks without having to go the competition. Volkswagen's Latin American trucks had always been built much heavier than elsewhere in the world, where this sector has mainly been the responsibility of MAN. The Peterbilt-Volkswagen 200 was affectionately known as "Peter Rabbit."

== Facilities ==
Volkswagen do Brasil operates four factories:

| Location | Opened | Current products |
|---|---|---|
| São Bernardo do Campo | November 18, 1959; 66 years ago | Nivus, Virtus, Saveiro |
| São Carlos | October 12, 1996; 30 years ago | Engines |
| Taubaté | January 14, 1976; 50 years ago | Polo Track, Tera |
| São José dos Pinhais | January 18, 1999; 27 years ago | T-Cross |

== CEOs ==
- Friedrich Schulz-Wenk (1953–1969)
- Rudolf Leiding (1969–1973)
- Wolfgang Sauer (1973–1993)
- Herbert Demel (1997–2002)
- Paul S. Fleming (2002–2003)
- Hans-Christian Maergner (2004–2007)
- Thomas Schmall (2007–2015)
- David Powels (2015 - 2017)
- Pablo Di Si (2017 - 2022)
- Ciro Possobom (2022 - Present)

== See also ==
- List of German cars
- Volkswagen Group of America
- Volkswagen Group China
