= Volkswagen Type 4 =

Volkswagen 411; Volkswagen 412
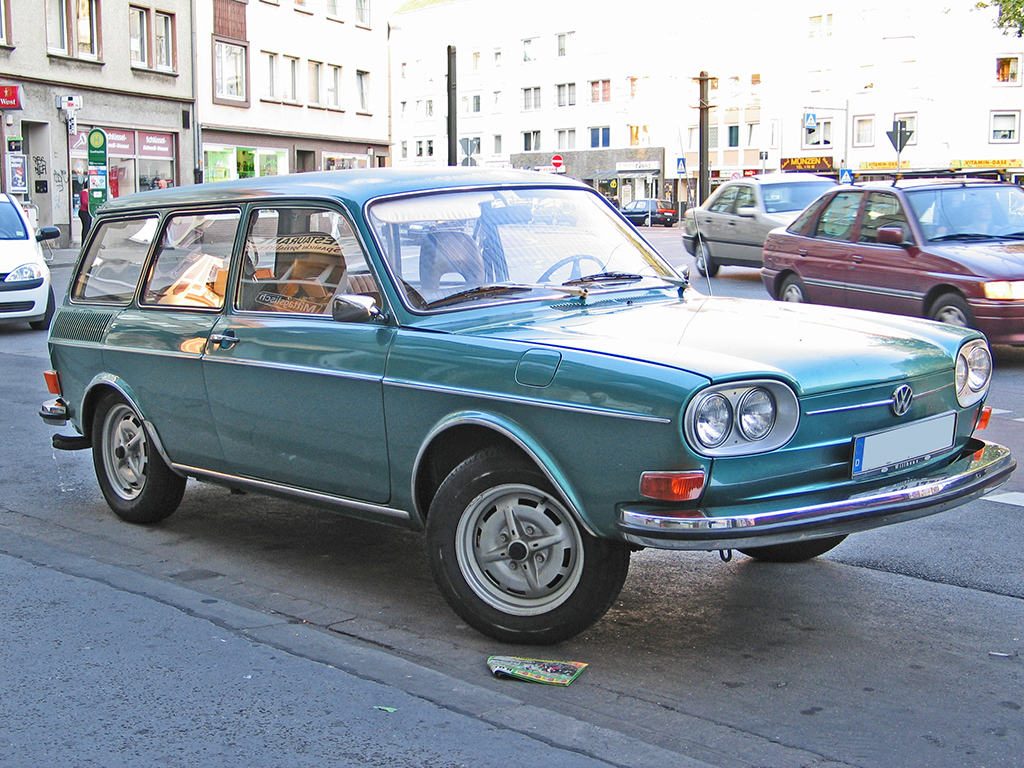
- Volkswagen 411 LE Variant

Overview
- Manufacturer: Volkswagen AG
- Production: 411: August 1968 – July 1972; 412: August 1972 – July 1974
- Assembly: Germany: Wolfsburg (1968–1973); Germany: Salzgitter (1973–1974); South Africa: Uitenhage (1969–1974)
- Designer: Pininfarina; Brooks Stevens (412)

Body and chassis
- Class: Compact / mid-size (D-class) family car
- Body style: 2-door fastback; 4-door fastback saloon; 3-door estate
- Layout: RR layout
- Related: Volkswagen Type 3

Powertrain
- Engine: 1679 cc Flat-4 (1968–1973); 1795 cc Flat-4 (1973–1974)
- Transmission: 4-speed manual; 3-speed automatic (optional)

Dimensions
- Wheelbase: 2,500 mm (98.4 in)
- Length: 4,553 mm (179.3 in) (411); 4,583 mm (180.4 in) (412)
- Width: 1,675 mm (65.9 in)
- Height: 1,475 mm (58.1 in)
- Curb weight: 1,020 kg (2,249 lb) 2-door 411; 1,120 kg (2,470 lb) Variant

Chronology
- Successor: Volkswagen Passat

The Volkswagen Type 4 is a compact / midsize family car, manufactured and marketed by Volkswagen of Germany as a D‑segment car from 1968 to 1974 in two-door and four-door sedan as well as two-door station wagon body styles. The Type 4 evolved through two generations, the 411 (1968–1972) and 412 series (1972–1974).

Designed under the direction of Heinrich Nordhoff and introduced at the Paris Motor Show in October 1968, the 411 was Volkswagen's largest passenger vehicle with the company's largest engine – with styling credited to Carrozzeria Pininfarina, who at the time had an advisory contract with Volkswagen. The cars retained VW's trademark air-cooled, rear placement, rear-wheel drive, boxer engine with a front/rear weight distribution of 45/55% and a forward cargo storage 400 L (14.1 ft^{3}) — while also introducing design and engineering departures for the company – including a completely flat passenger area floor and suspension using control arms and MacPherson struts. Volkswagen had prototyped a notchback sedan and convertible versions of the 411, without introducing them to production.

Over six-years, Type 4 production reached 367,728, compared to 210,082 of the subsequent Volkswagen K70 over four model years. Sales reached 119,627 in the United States (1971-1974); 119,094 in Germany; 34,452 in South Africa and 13,367 in the United Kingdom.

Volkswagen's last air-cooled sedans and wagons, (aside from the Brasília which carried on until 1982) the Type 4 models were succeeded by the first generation Passat.

== Features ==
As Volkswagen's first 4-door saloon, the Type 4 also introduced unibody construction, coil springs, trailing wishbone rear suspension, hydraulic clutch manual transmission – as well as MacPherson strut front suspension: the 411's front suspension layout was subsequently adopted for the VW Type 1 1302/1303 ("Super Beetle").

When the Type 4 was discontinued in 1974, its engine carried on as the power plant for the larger-engined Volkswagen Type 2 models, produced from 1972 to 1979, and for the later Volkswagen Type 2 (T3) bus from 1980 until 1983.

== 411 ==
At launch, the 411 featured a 1679 cc engine with twin carburetors, subsequently modified in 1969 with Bosch D-Jetronic electronic fuel injection and with claimed power output increased from 68 to 80 PS (50 to 59 kW). This fuel-injected engine was shared with the mid-engined Porsche 914, also launched in 1969. European 411 nomenclature highlighted the fuel injection with the suffix 'E' (for Einspritzung). Revisions in 1969 also included replacement of the single oval headlights with twin round headlights.

The Type 4's battery was located under the front passenger seat. All models featured ventless driver and front passenger windows, notched on their leading edge to provide draught-free ventilation, no cost metallic paint, radial ply tires, full carpeting, clock, electric rear window demister, flow-through ventilation, undercoating, and a thermostatically controlled auxiliary heating system, specifically, a gasoline-operated heater model BA4 by Eberspächer, fired by a spark plug, accessible from a hidden rear window deck plate.

The 411 was also assembled in South Africa beginning in 1969, in two- or four-door configurations. The four-door only came as a DeLuxe and was available with an optional automatic transmission, while the two-door was available either as a Standard or a DeLuxe.

In 1968, Karmann presented a 411-based cabriolet prototype which did not enter production.

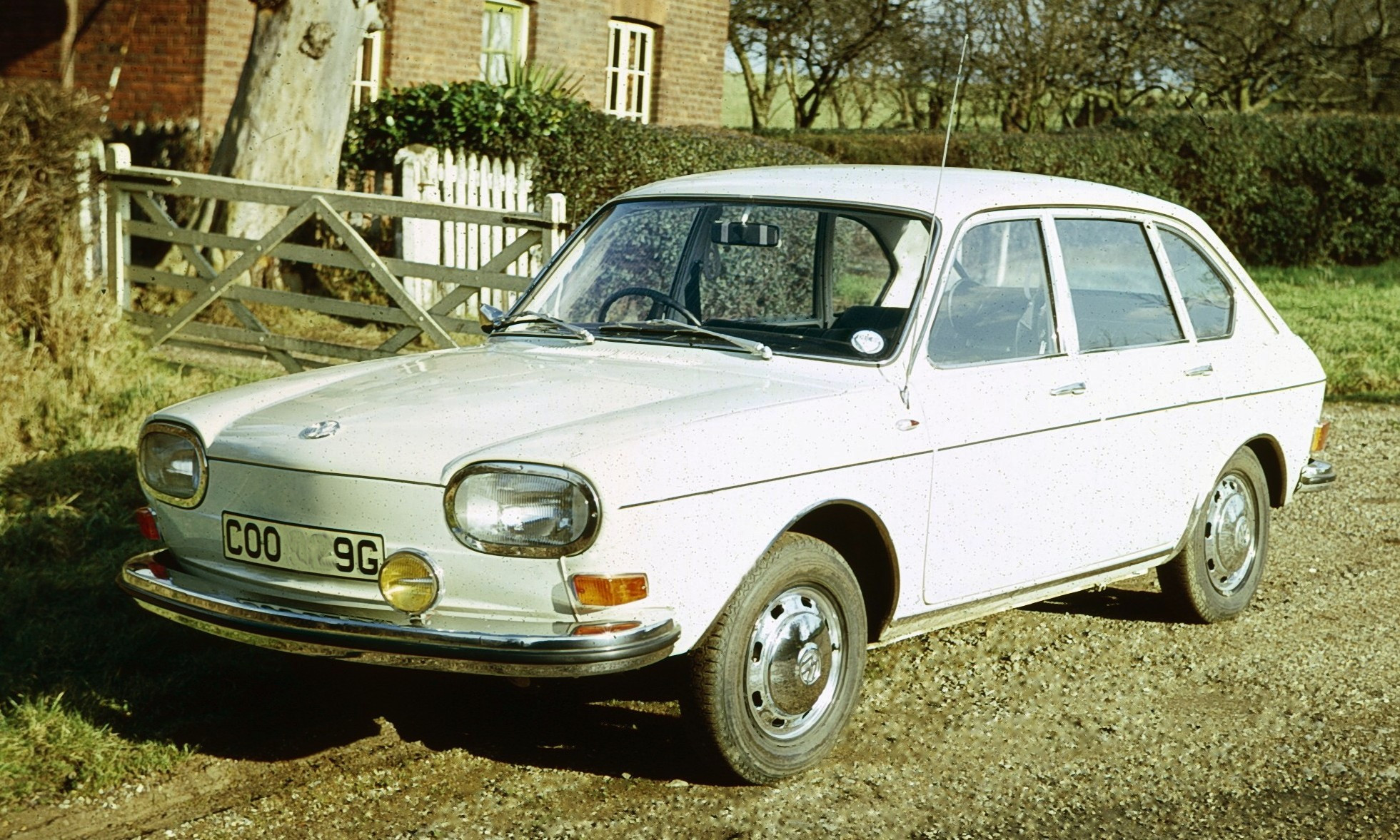
1968 Volkswagen 411L 4-door saloon. 1968 models are distinguished by their single oblong covered headlamps.

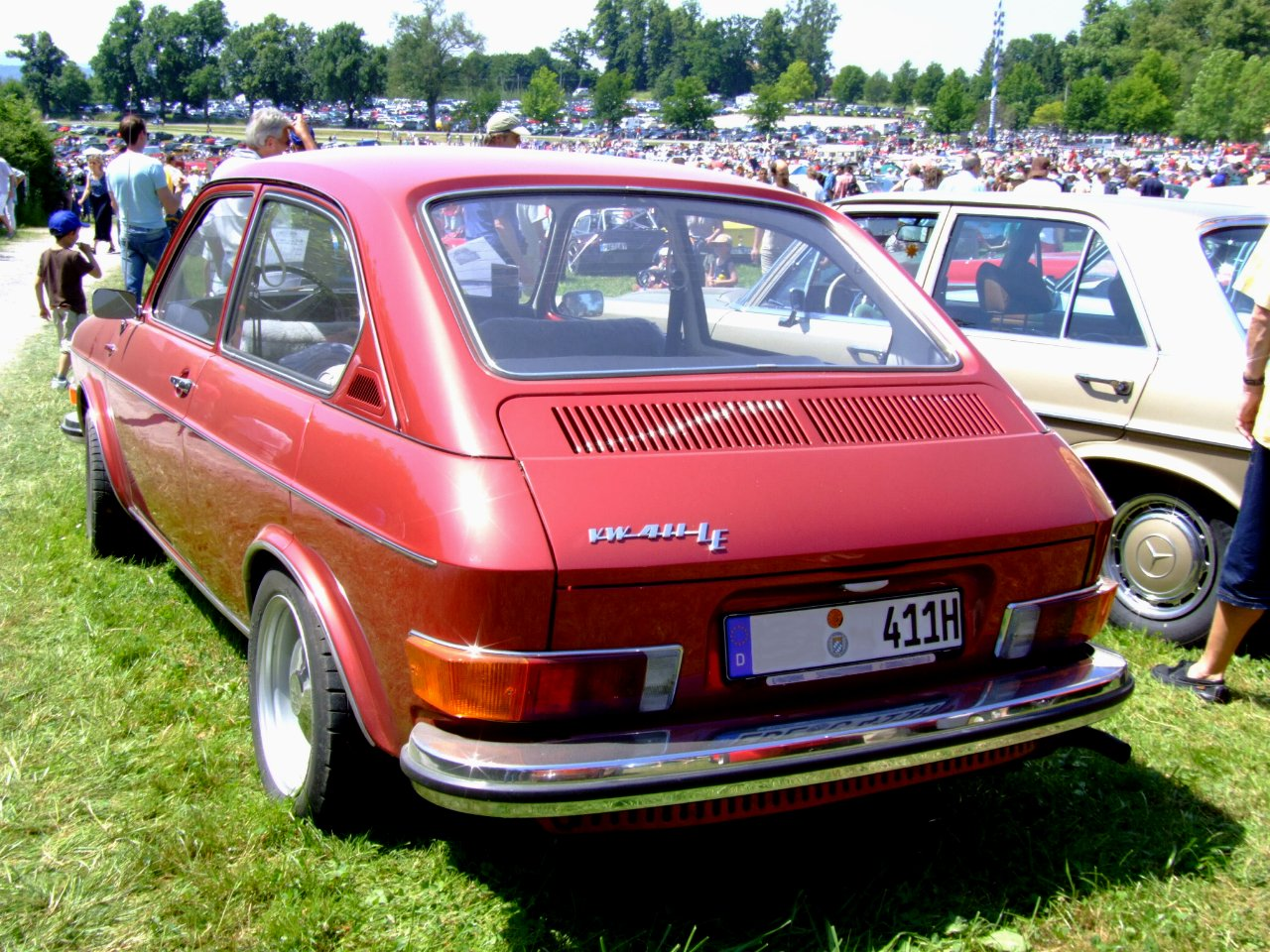
1971 Volkswagen 411 LE

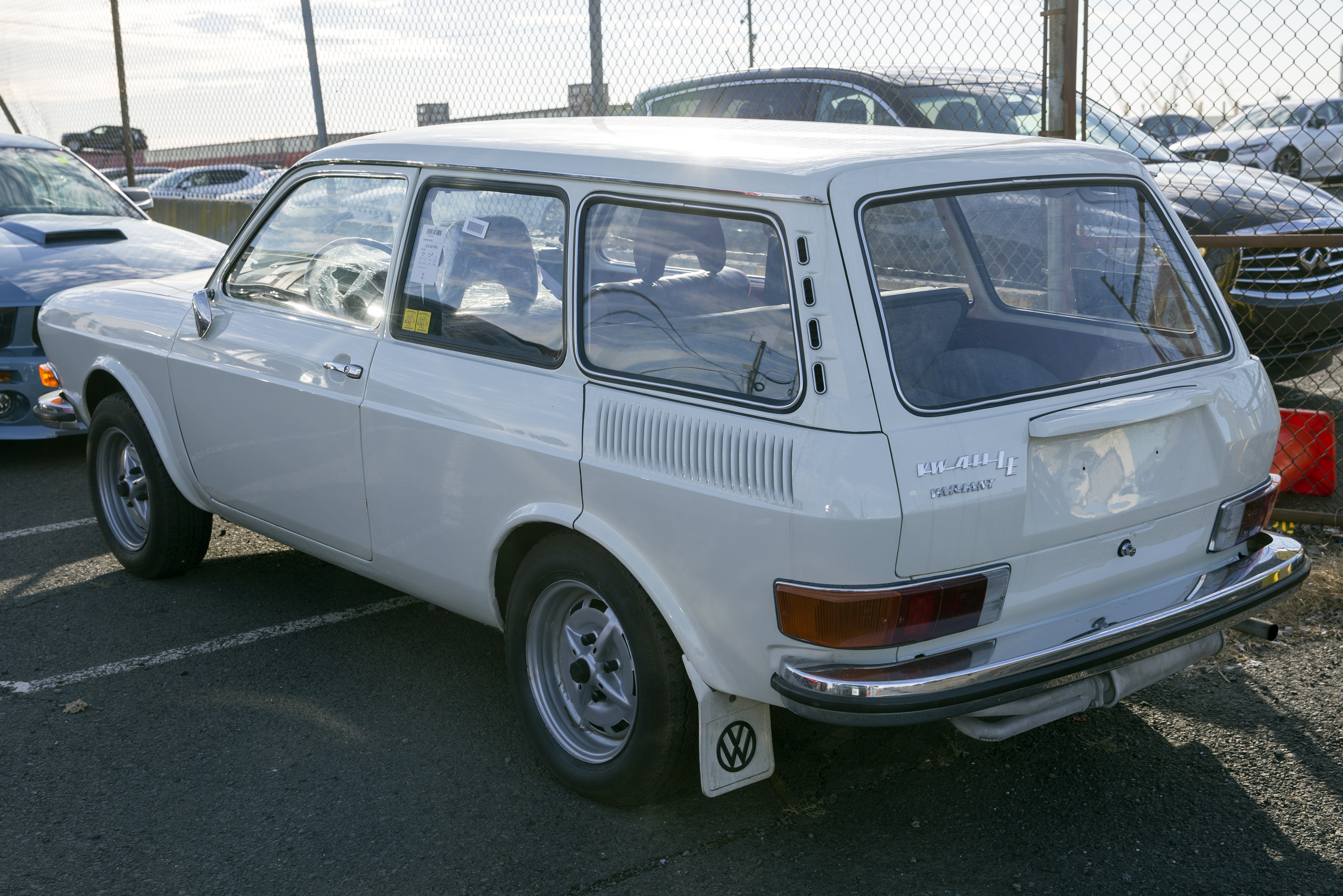
1972 Volkswagen 411 LE Variant, rear view

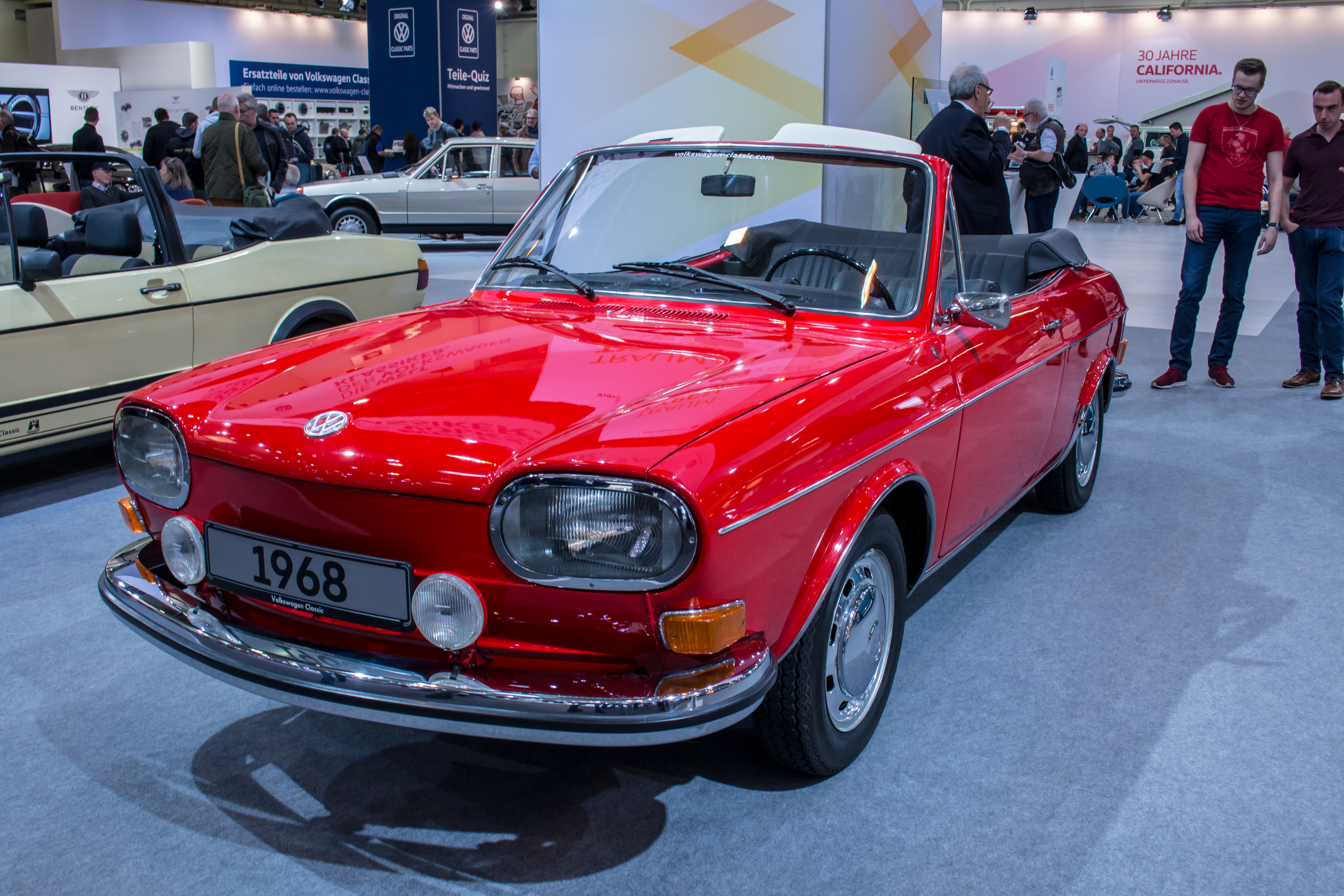
411 convertible concept

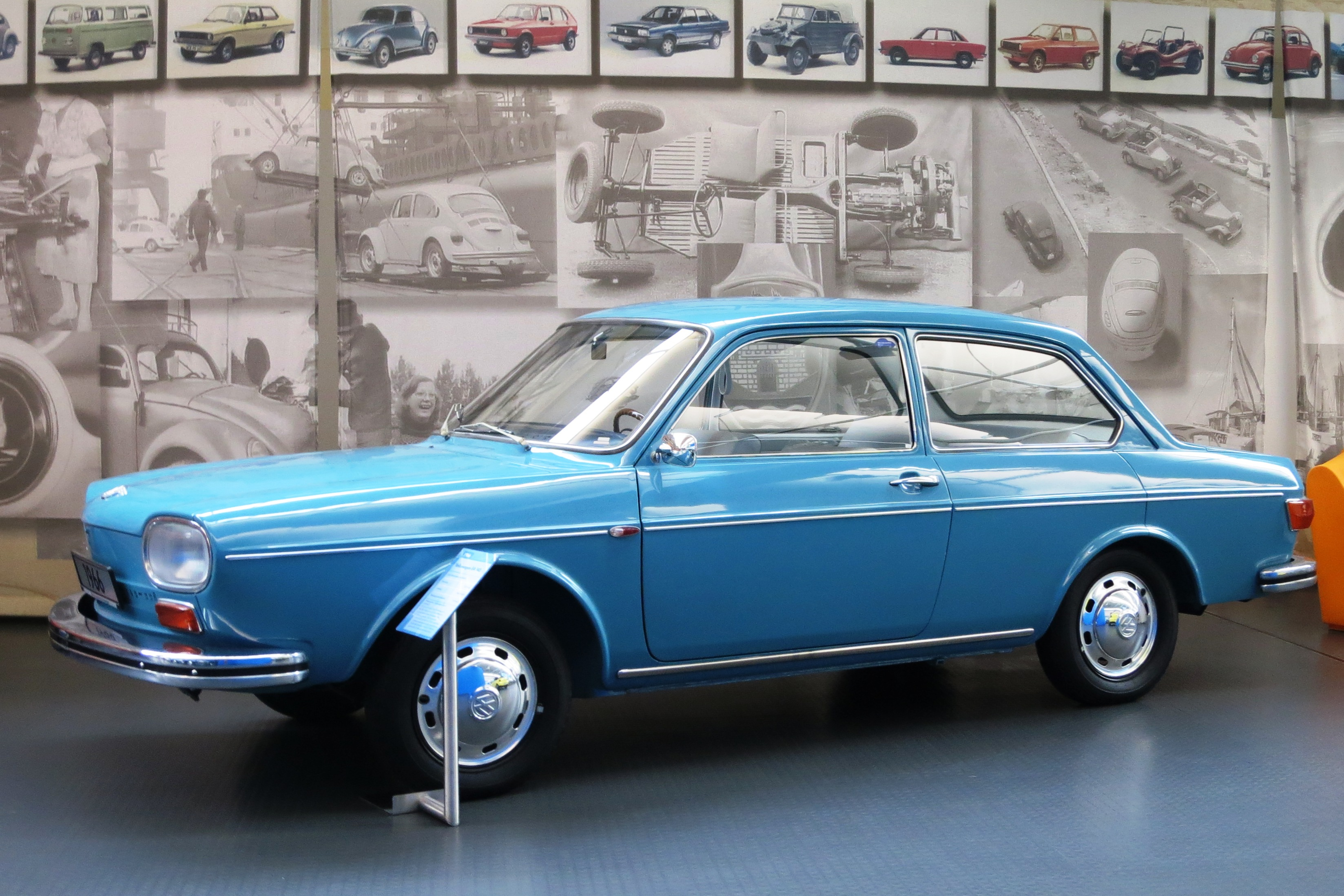
Type 4 notchback prototype

== 412 ==
The 412 replaced the 411 in August 1972 in Germany, The redesign by noted stylist Brooks Stevens featured Halogen lights, revised headlight surrounds and nose panels. In August 1973 (for the 1974 model year), the engine capacity was raised to 1795 cc and fuel management reverted to a twin carburettor system; the 412LE was renamed 412LS. North American models continued to be equipped with the Bosch fuel injection system. This was to be the last model year for the 412, with production ending in June 1974.

The visual design of the Volkswagen 412 Variant was retained when the Brazilian Type 3 models TL, Variant, Variant II, and later Brazilian Variant-based Volkswagen Brasilia were produced in Brazil, primarily for the Latin American markets.

In February 1974, the four-door 412L was priced at DM 10,995 (DM 11,145 for the 412 LS) in the German home market.

The 412 was also built in South Africa from 1972 to 1974. The specification varied somewhat from European models, with the omission of the petrol heater, no rear window de-fogger as standard and with different paint options and interior trim. A total of 34,452 of the Type 4 (411 and 412) were produced in South Africa between 1969 and 1974.

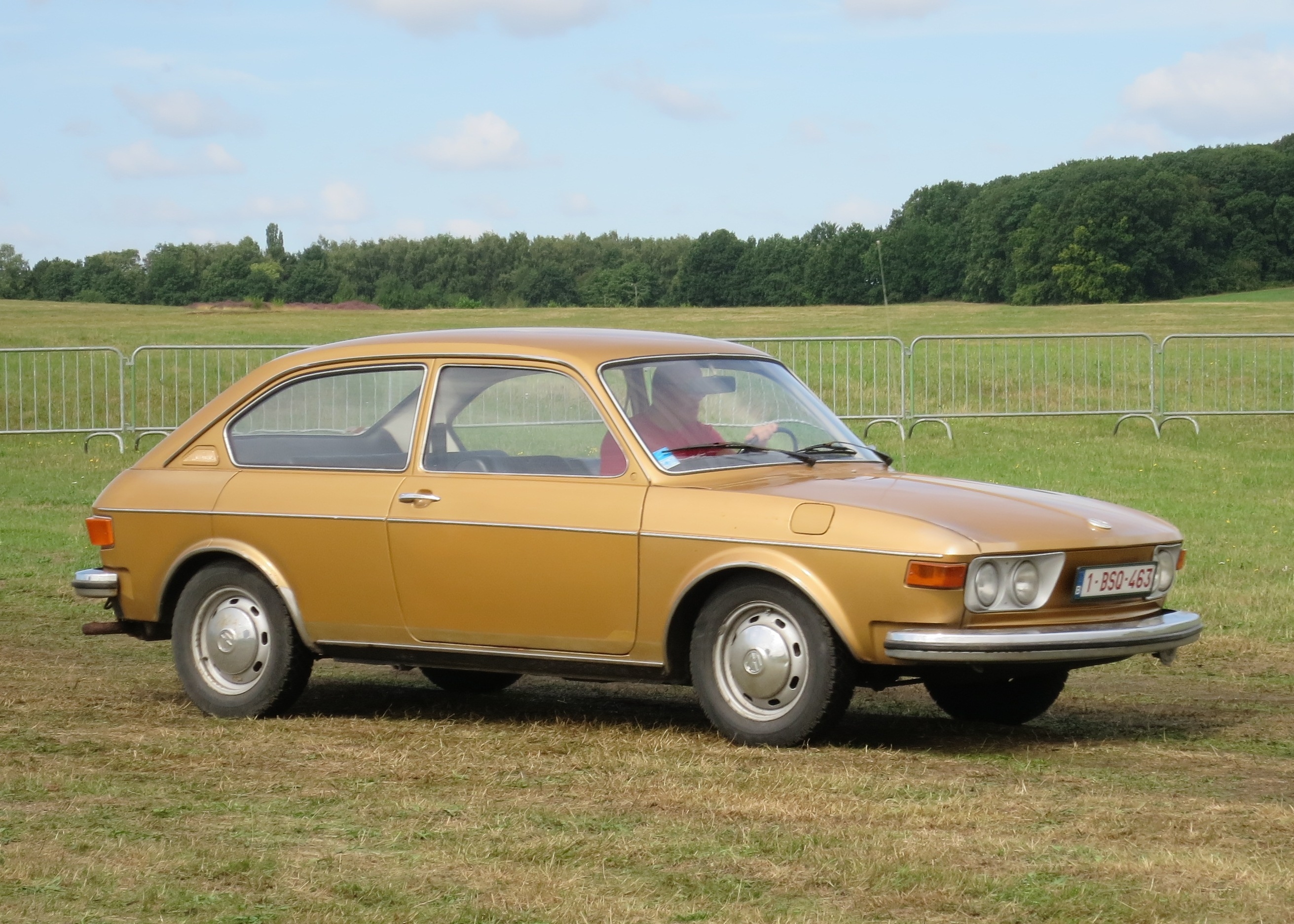
Volkswagen 412 (fastback)

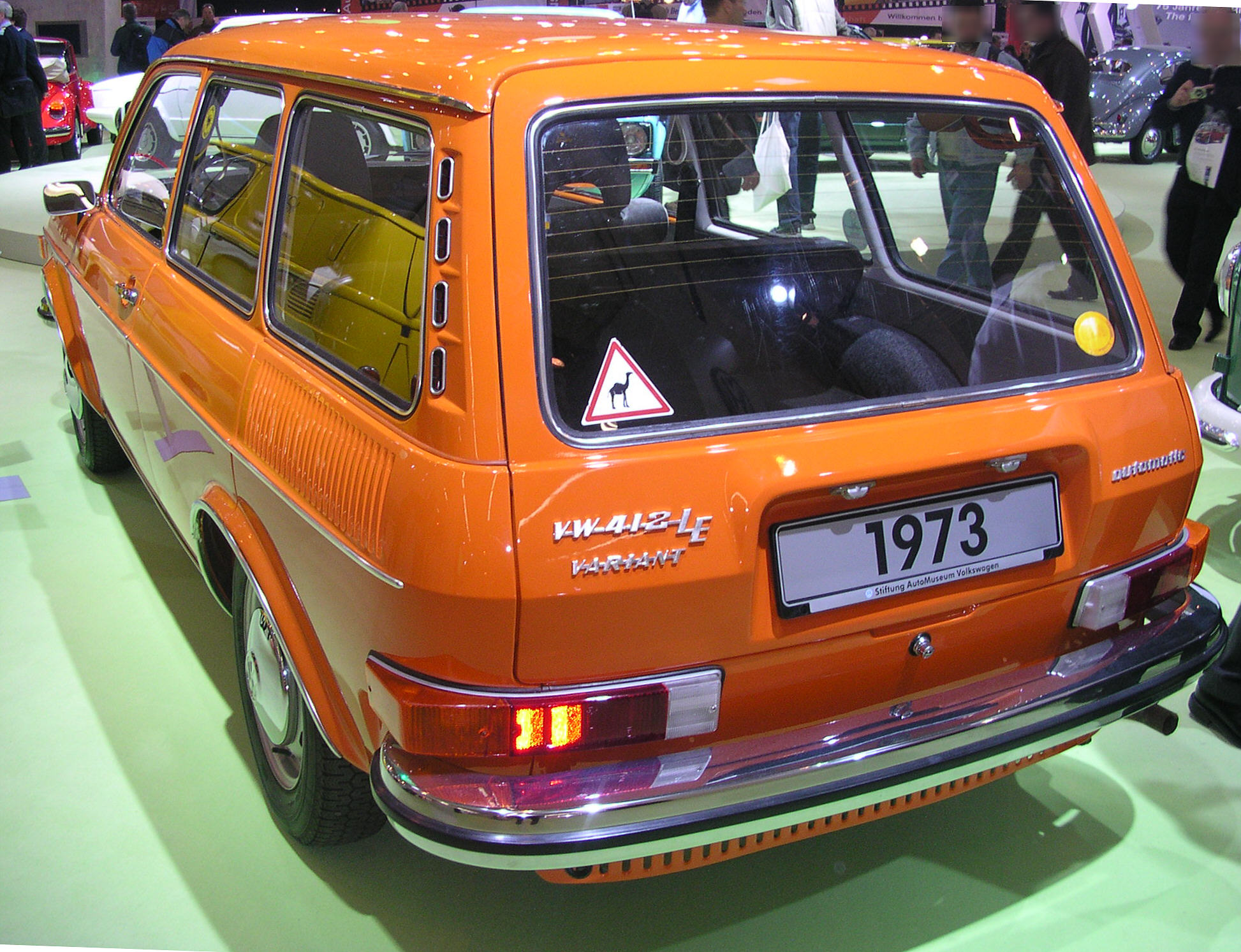
VW 412 LE Variant

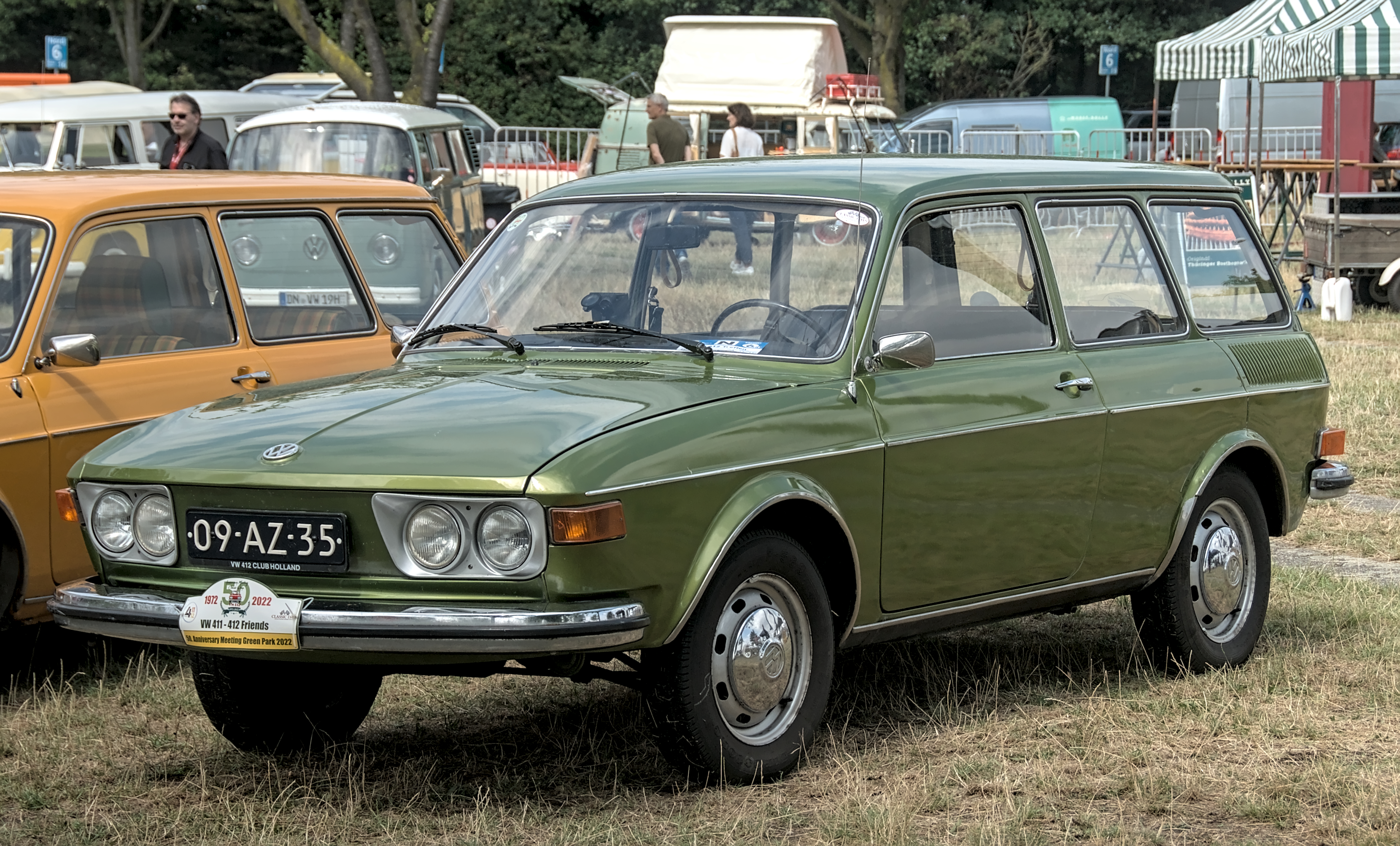
VW 412 L Variant

== Data ==
Technical data Volkswagen Type 4 (Manufacturer's figures except where stated)
Volkswagen 411 / 412	411 2- or 4-door saloon	411 E/ LE 2- or 4-door saloon Variant (3-door estate)	412 E/LE 2- or 4-door saloon Variant (3-door estate)	412 2- or 4-door saloon Variant (3-door estate)	412 S 2- or 4-door saloon
Produced:	1968–1969	1969–1972	1972–1973	1973–1974	1973–1974
Engine:	Four-stroke 4-cylinder boxer motor, rear-mounted				
Displacement:	1679 cc	1679 cc	1679 cc	1795 cc	1795 cc
Bore x Stroke:	90 x 66	90 x 66	90 x 66	93 x 66	93 x 66
Max. Power @ rpm:	68 hp (51 kW) @ 4500	80 hp (60 kW) @ 4900	80 hp (60 kW) @ 4900	75 hp (56 kW) @ 5000	85 hp (63 kW) @ 5000
Max. Torque @ rpm:	124 N⋅m (91 lb⋅ft) @ 2800	132 N⋅m (97 lb⋅ft) @ 2700	132 N⋅m (97 lb⋅ft) @ 2700	129 N⋅m (95 lb⋅ft) @ 3400	135 N⋅m (100 lb⋅ft) @ 3400
Compression Ratio:	7.8 : 1	8.2 : 1	8.2 : 1	-	-
Fuel feed:	Twin carburettors Solex 34 PDSIT	Electronic Fuel Injection; Bosch D-Jetronic		Twin carburettors Solex 40 PDSIT	
Fuel tank capacity:	50 L (13.2 US gal; 11.0 imp gal)				
Valvetrain:					
Cooling:	Air				
Gearbox:	4-speed all-synchromesh manual with floor-mounted lever control & rear-wheel drive Optional 3-speed automatic				
Electrical system:	12-volt				
Front suspension:	Independent. MacPherson Struts				
Rear suspension::	Independent. Semi-trailing arms with double joint axles and coil springs				
Brakes:	Front discs / rear drums: Optional power assistance				
Steering:	Recirculating ball				
Body structure:	Monocoque				
Dry weight:	1,020 kg (2,250 lb) - 1,080 kg (2,380 lb) ( 2-door); 1,040 kg (2,290 lb) - 1,100 kg (2,400 lb) ( 4-door); 1,120 kg (2,470 lb) ( Variant)		1,080 kg (2,380 lb) ( 2-door); 1,100 kg (2,400 lb) ( 4-door); 1,120 kg (2,470 lb) ( Variant)		
Track front/ rear:	1,376 mm (54.2 in) 1,342 mm (52.8 in)	1,376 mm (54.2 in) 1,342 mm (52.8 in)	1,386 mm (54.6 in) 1,350 mm (53 in)	1,386 mm (54.6 in) 1,350 mm (53 in)	1,386 mm (54.6 in) 1,350 mm (53 in)
Wheelbase:	2,500 mm (98 in)				
Length:	4,553 mm (179.3 in) Saloon; 4,525 mm (178.1 in) Variant		4,583 mm (180.4 in) Saloon; 4,555 mm (179.3 in) Variant		
Width:	1,636 mm (64.4 in)				
Height:	1,486 mm (58.5 in)				
Top Speeds........Manual:....Automatic:	145 km/h (90 mph); 142 km/h (88 mph)	155 km/h (96 mph); 152 km/h (94 mph)	155 km/h (96 mph); 152 km/h (94 mph)	150 km/h (93 mph); 147 km/h (91 mph)	158 km/h (98 mph); 155 km/h (96 mph)
Acceleration 0 – 100 km/h (0 - 62 mph)........Manual:....Automatic:	18.0 s 21.0 s	17.0 s 20.0 s	17.0 s 20.0 s	16.5 s 20.0 s	14.5 s 17.5 s
