= Volkswagen Brasília =

Brazilian automobile

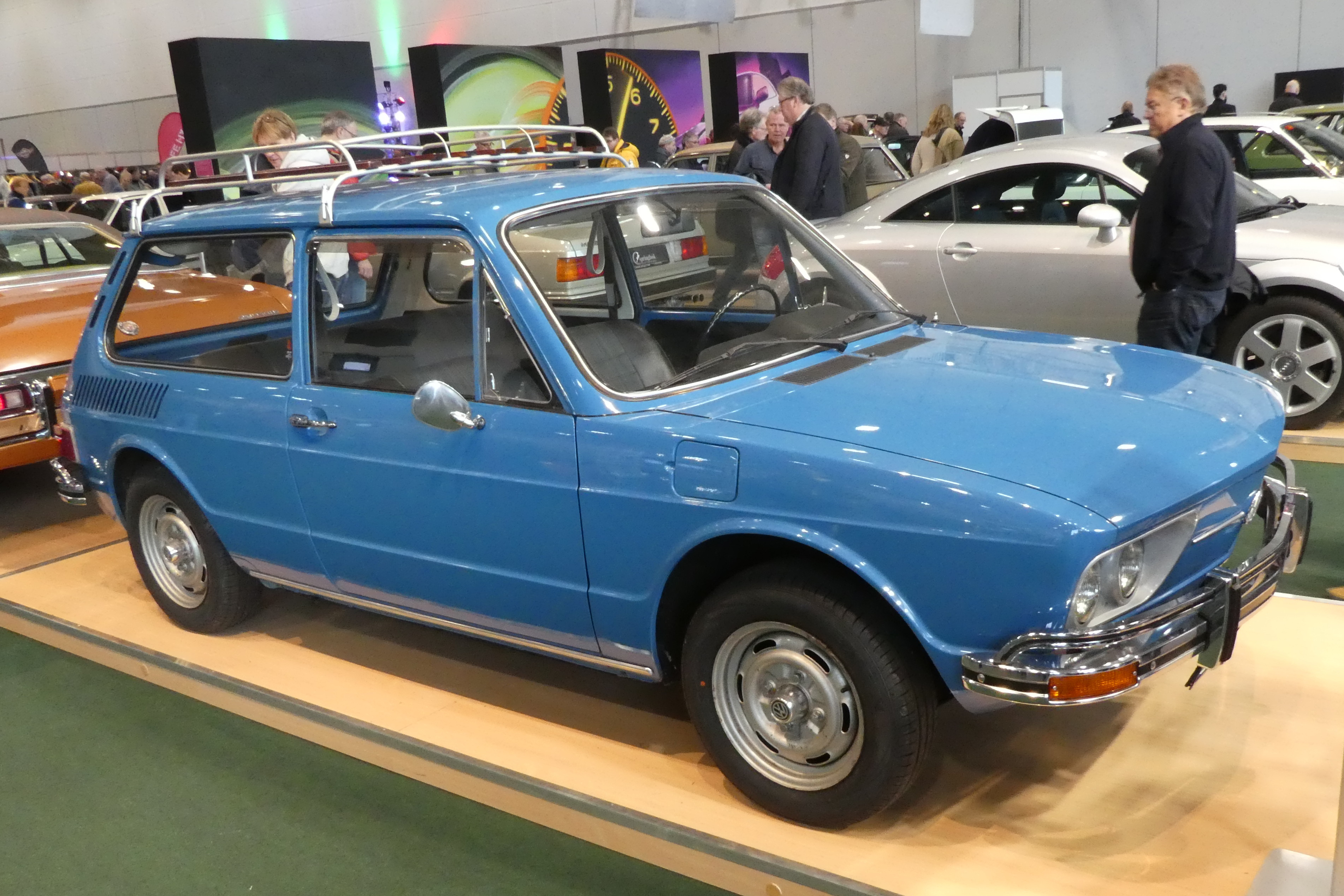
- 3-door body

Overview
- Manufacturer: Volkswagen
- Also called: Type 321 (internal name); Volkswagen Igala (Nigeria)
- Production: 1973–1982
- Assembly: Brazil: São Bernardo do Campo; Brazil: Taubaté; Mexico: Puebla; Nigeria: Lagos
- Designer: Márcio Piancastelli

Body and chassis
- Class: Small family car (C), economy car
- Body style: 3-door hatchback 5-door hatchback
- Layout: RR
- Related: Volkswagen Fusca

Powertrain
- Engine: 1.6 L air-cooled H4
- Transmission: 4-speed manual with reverse

Dimensions
- Wheelbase: 2,400 mm (94.5 in)
- Length: 4,015 mm (158.1 in)
- Width: 1,605 mm (63.2 in)
- Height: 1,430 mm (56.3 in)
- Curb weight: 890 kg (1,962 lb)

Chronology
- Successor: Volkswagen Gol

The Volkswagen Brasília is a rear-engined small family car developed by Volkswagen do Brasil and internally designated as the Type 321. Named for Brazil's capital city, the car was manufactured and marketed by Volkswagen in Brazil from 1973 to 1982; in Mexico from 1975 to 1982; and built from knock down kits in Nigeria, where it was marketed as the Igala from 1976 to 1980.

Designed to replace the Beetle (called the Fusca in Brazil), and available in both three-door and five-door hatchback body styles, the Brasília combined VW's air-cooled engine with the chassis of the Volkswagen Karmann Ghia and styling reminiscent of the Volkswagen 412. By the end of 1982, over one million examples had been manufactured.

== History ==
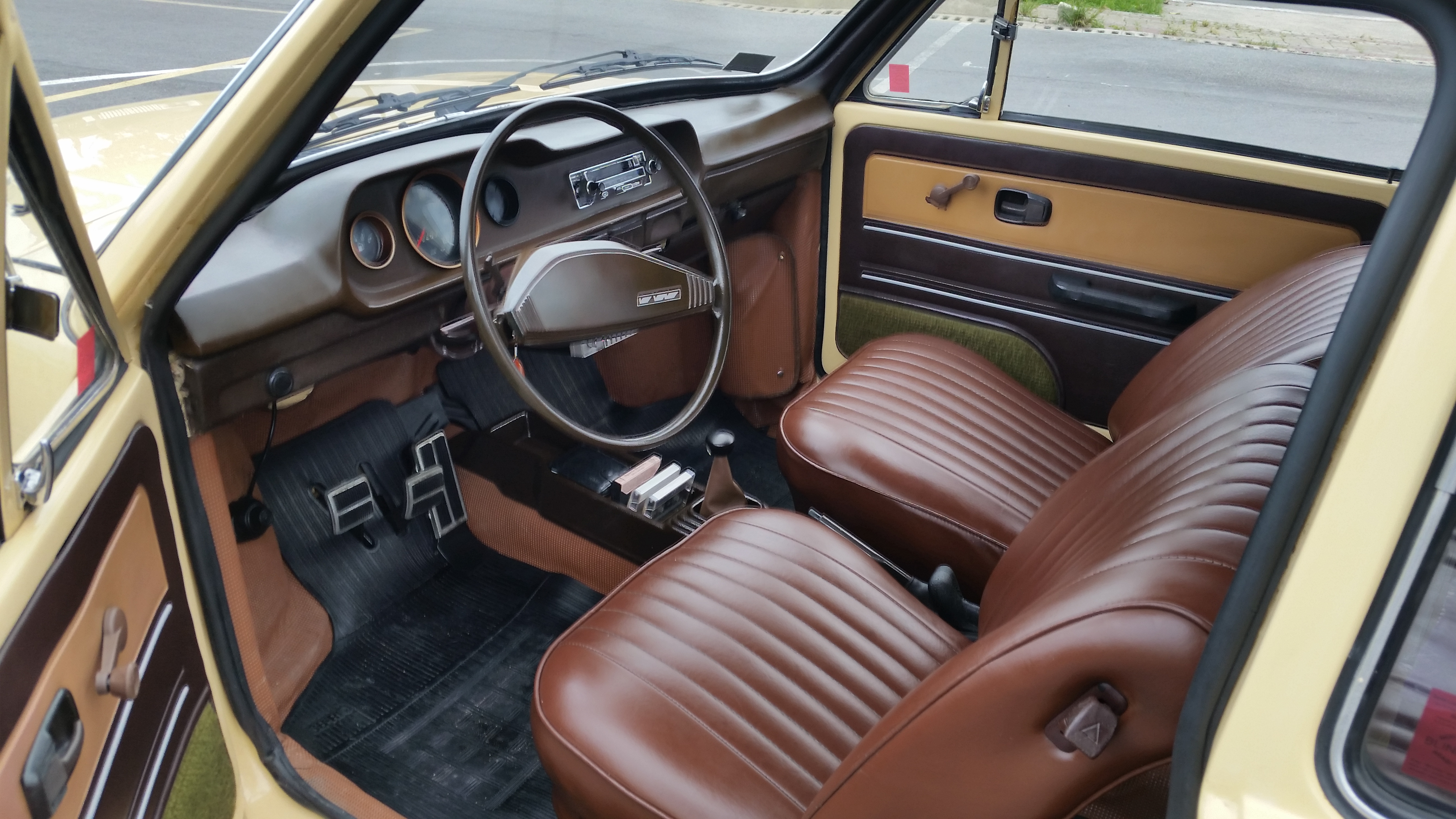
1979 model interior

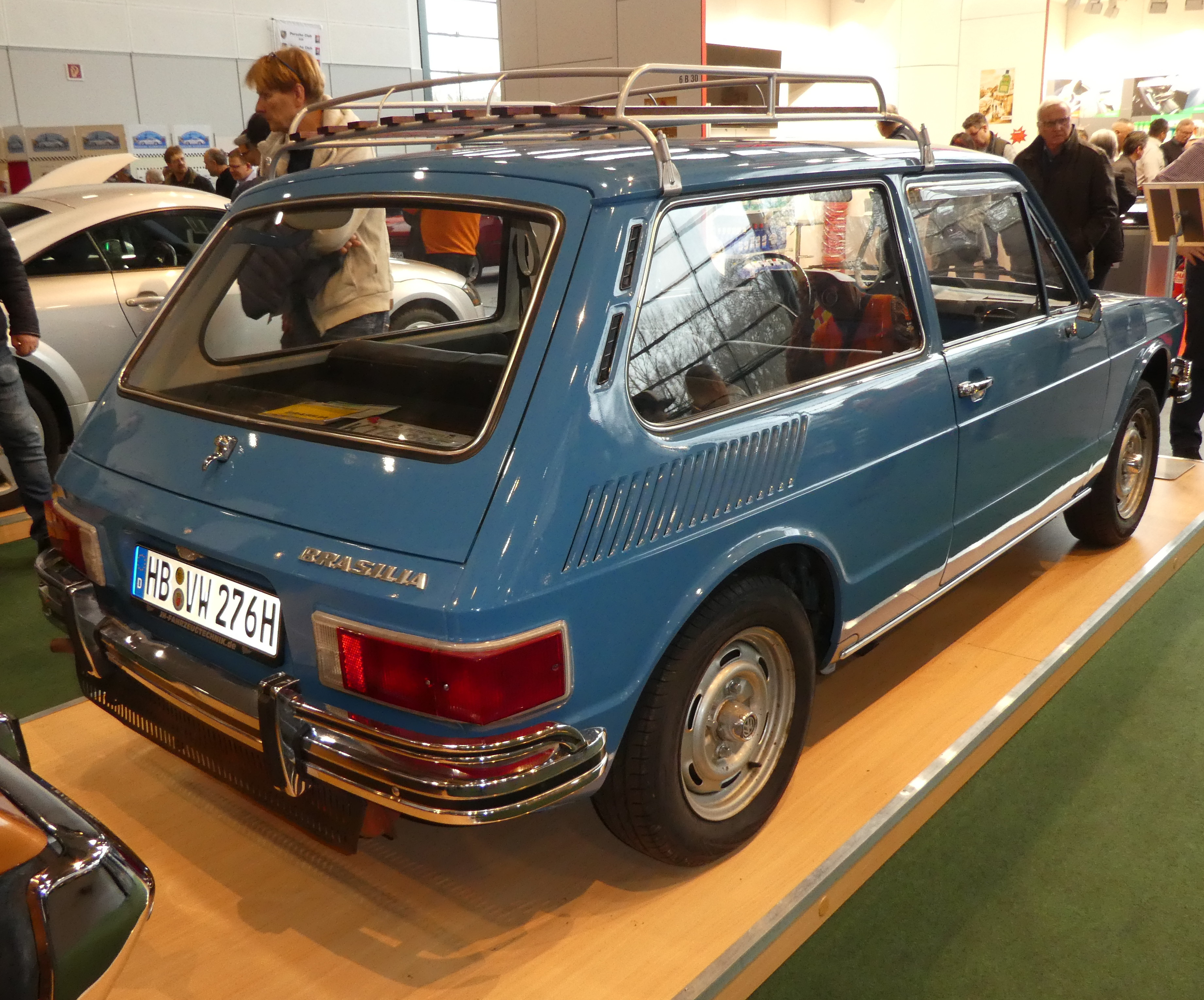
3-door rear view

In September 1970, Volkswagen of Brazil's president, Rudolf Leiding, challenged the company's designers to recreate the Fusca with the Brazilian market in mind. Leiding wanted this new Volkswagen to be practical, economical, and larger than the Fusca. In three months, more than 40 prototypes were developed. The prototypes were expensive, and VW was looking for an inexpensive car to compete with the brand new Chevette, from General Motors do Brasil.

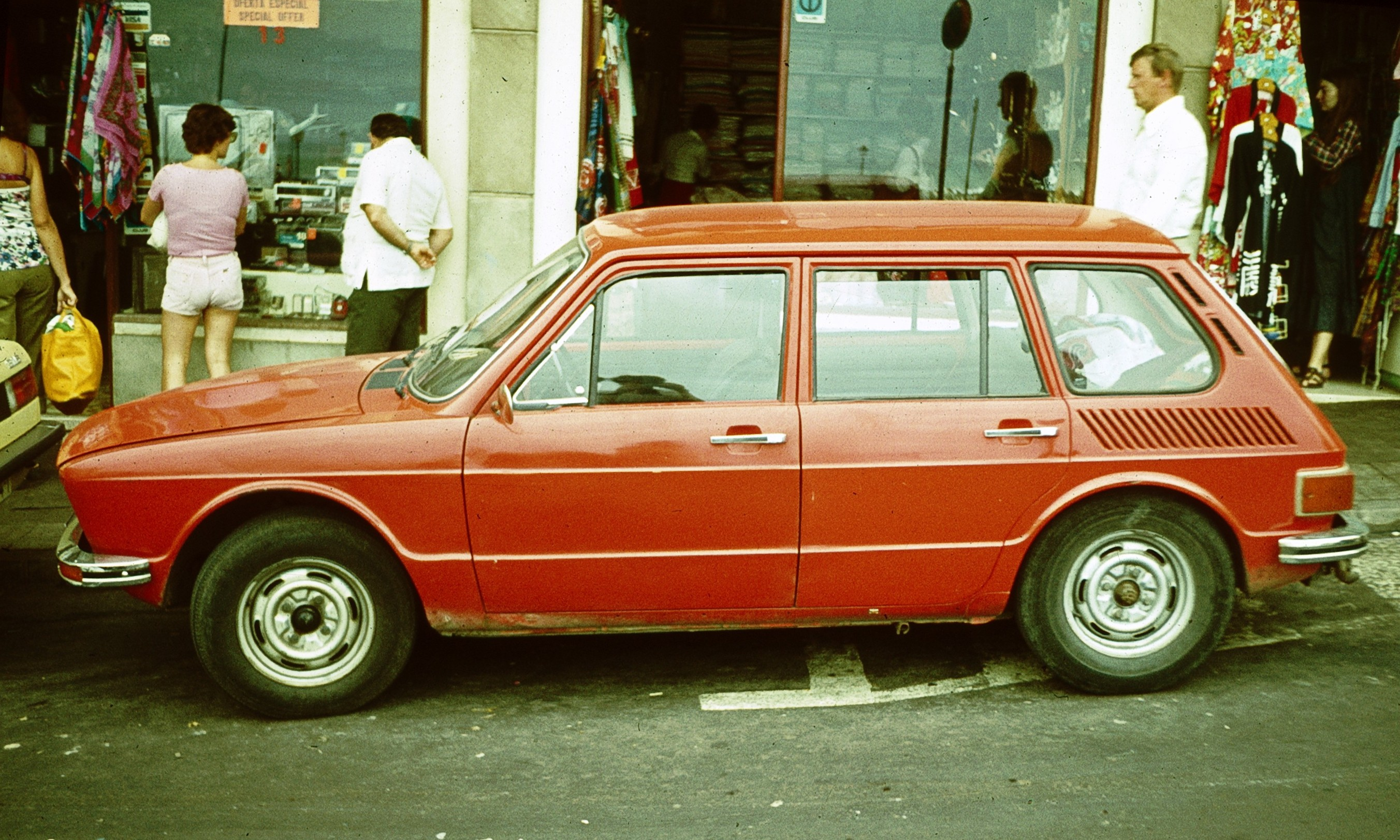
Five-door in Tenerife

Sales began in 1973, following its premiere in May that year. The Brasília was originally marketed as a small commercial van to take advantage of the lower tax rates on "trucks" — a classification and marketing approach that may have hampered initial sales. The Brasília was the first Brazilian hatchback with five doors, although this version was manufactured in small numbers, and more were exported than sold in Brazil.

Total production reached over one million vehicles, including exports of cars to Chile, Portugal, Bolivia, Peru, Ecuador, Venezuela, Paraguay, Mexico, Spain, Uruguay, the Philippines and, starting in March 1976, of CKD kits of the five-door to Nigeria, where it was renamed the Igala. The Brasília was also assembled in Mexico from 1974 to 1982, but only in a version with two doors. In total, 72,377 examples were assembled there. The engine was the same, 1.6-liter, 34 kW DIN (46 PS; 45 bhp) boxer engine as used in Brazil. In addition to DIN figures, Volkswagen Mexico also provided ratings in SAE net and SAE gross, 32 and 40 kW (44 and 55 PS; 43 and 54 bhp) respectively. This was enough for a claimed top speed of 128 km/h (80 mph)

The Brasília achieved notoriety before its release when a reporter photographing preliminary test vehicles near the factory was fired upon by security personnel — triggering Brazilian media attention, an official apology from Volkswagen, and increased sales for Brazilian car magazine Quatro Rodas, which purchased the photographs. The reporter, Cláudio Larangeira, was immediately hired by Quatro Rodas.

== Engine and transmission ==
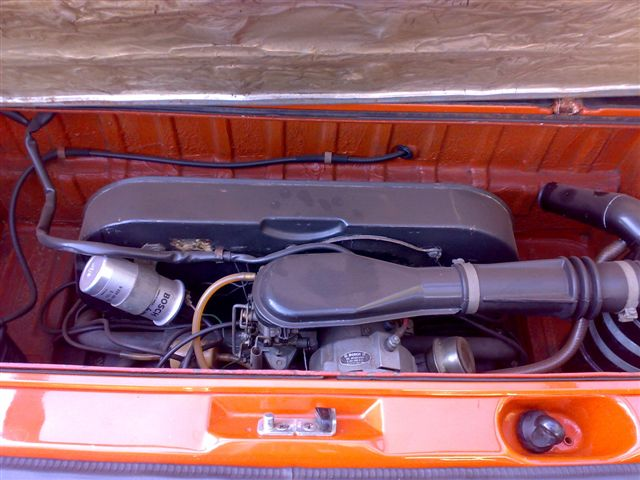
Engine compartment

The Brasília has an air-cooled flat-four engine, originally with a single carburetor, mounted in a rear-engine, rear-wheel-drive layout. It has a manual transmission with four forward speeds and reverse. In the 1980s, Volkswagen also offered an optional 1300 cc ethanol-fueled engine making 49 PS (36.0 kW). The 1974 Brasília, with dual carburetors, could travel 10.4 km (6.46 mi) on one liter of gasoline on the highway. Its urban fuel consumption is around 14 km/L (39.5 mpg_{‑imp}; 32.9 mpg_{‑US}).

== Performance ==
Quatro Rodas tested both the VW Brasília and GM Chevette in March 1980. The Chevette took 19.7 seconds to accelerate from 0 to 100 km/h (62 mph) and the Brasília took 23 seconds. The Chevette's maximum speed was 138 km/h (86 mph) while the Brasília could reach 129 km/h (80 mph). The Chevrolet achieved 15.4 km/L (43.5 mpg_{‑imp}; 36.2 mpg_{‑US}) and the Volkswagen achieved 13.4 km/L (37.9 mpg_{‑imp}; 31.5 mpg_{‑US}) on a mileage comparison. The Brasília was equipped with disc brakes on the front wheels, drum brakes on the rear wheels. Beginning with the 1977 model year, the Brasília featured dual circuit brakes and a collapsible steering wheel modified for collision safety.

== Retirement ==
In 1975, Volkswagen do Brasil considered the production of a front-engined, water-cooled Brasília to replace the aging Fusca. Their final decision, however, was to develop and build an all new front-engined vehicle — the Volkswagen Gol hatchback. When the 1.3 L Gol debuted it was no direct threat to the Brasília, but with the adoption of a more powerful 1.6 L engine, the company chose the Gol to compete against the Fiat 147, the Ford Corcel and the Chevrolet Chevette.
