= Volkswagen =

German automobile brand

- Logo used since 2019
- Formerly: Gesellschaft zur Vorbereitung des Deutschen Volkswagens mbH (1937–1938); Volkswagenwerk GmbH (1938–1960); Volkswagenwerk AG (1960–1985)
- Type: Division
- Industry: Automotive
- Founded: 28 May 1937; 89 years ago in Wolfsburg, Germany
- Founder: German Labour Front
- Headquarters: Wolfsburg, Germany
- Area served: Worldwide
- Revenue: ▲€321.9 billion (2025)
- Operating income: ▼€8.9 billion (2025)
- Net income: ▼€6.9 billion (2025)
- Parent: Volkswagen Group
- Website: www.vw.com/en.html

Volkswagen (German pronunciation: [ˈfɔlksˌvaːɡŋ̍]), (Note: English: UK: /ˈfɒlksvɑːɡən, ˈvɒl-/, US: /ˈfɔːlksvɑːɡən, ˈvɔːl-, ˈvoʊk-, -wɑːɡ-, -wæɡ-/.) commonly abbreviated to VW, is a German automobile brand based in Wolfsburg, Lower Saxony, Germany. Established in 1937 by the German Labour Front, it was revived after World War II by British Army officer Ivan Hirst and grew into a global brand. As of 2025, the company had a market capitalization of approximately US$58.9 billion.

The name Volkswagen derives from the German words Volk ('people') and Wagen ('wagon'), meaning 'people's car', or more directly 'folk's wain (wagon)'. (Note: The term folkswain was once proposed by William Barnes as a purer alternative to the omnibus.)

== History ==
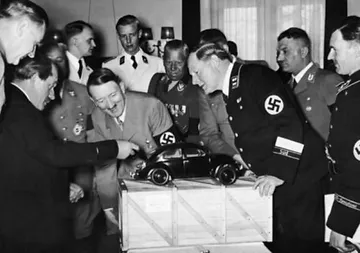
Ferdinand Porsche unveiling the Volkswagen concept to Adolf Hitler on 1 December 1934

=== 1932–1938: People's Car project ===
Volkswagen was established in 1937 by the Nazi Party's German Labour Front (Deutsche Arbeitsfront) as part of the Strength Through Joy (Kraft durch Freude, abbreviated to KdF) program in Berlin. In the early 1930s, cars were a luxury; most Germans could afford nothing more elaborate than a motorcycle, and only one out of 50 Germans owned a car. Seeking a potential new market, some car makers began independent "people's car" projects – the Mercedes 170H, BMW 3/15, Adler AutoBahn, Steyr 55 and Hanomag 1.3 L (79 in^{3}), among others.

The growing trend was not new; Béla Barényi, a pioneering automotive engineer, is credited as already having conceived the basic design during the mid-1920s. Josef Ganz developed the Standard Superior (going as far as to advertise it as the "German Volkswagen"). In Germany, Hanomag mass-produced the 2/10 PS Kommissbrot, a small, cheap rear-engined car, from 1925 to 1928. Also, in Czechoslovakia, the Hans Ledwinka-designed Tatra T77, a very popular car amongst the German elite, was becoming smaller and more affordable at each revision. Ferdinand Porsche, a well-known designer for high-end vehicles and race cars, had been trying for years to get a manufacturer interested in a small car suitable for a family. He built a car known as the Volksauto from the ground up in 1933, using many popular ideas and several of his own, putting together a car with an air-cooled rear engine, torsion bar suspension, and a "beetle" shape, the front bonnet rounded for better aerodynamics (necessary as it had a small engine).

Volkswagen's original logo from 1937 to 1939, depicting the company's initials surrounded by a stylised cogwheel and a spinning propeller resembling a swastika

In 1934, with many of the aforementioned projects still in development or early stages of production, Adolf Hitler became involved, ordering the production of a basic vehicle capable of transporting two adults and three children at 100 km/h (62 mph). He wanted a car every German family would be able to afford. The "People's Car" would be available through a savings plan at 990 ℛ︁ℳ︁, equivalent to €4,688 in 2021 – about the price of a small motorcycle (the average income being around 32 ℛ︁ℳ︁ a week, equivalent to €152 in 2021).

It soon became apparent that private industry could not turn out a car for only 990 ℛ︁ℳ︁. Thus, Hitler chose to sponsor an all-new, state-owned factory using Ferdinand Porsche's design (with some of Hitler's design suggestions, including an air-cooled engine so nothing could freeze). The intention was that German families could buy the car through a savings scheme ("Fünf Mark die Woche musst du sparen, willst du im eigenen Wagen fahren", transl. "You need to set aside five marks a week, if you want to drive in your own car"), which around 336,000 people eventually paid into. However, the project was not commercially viable, and only government support was able to keep it afloat. Due to the outbreak of World War II in 1939, none of the participants in the savings scheme ever received a car. In 1950, a lawsuit was issued that, after 12 years of trial, ultimately provided a credit of 12% off the list price of a new VW base model or roughly 20% of the value originally paid into the saving scheme.

Prototypes of the car called the KdF-Wagen (from the German term Kraft durch Freude, meaning 'strength through joy') first appeared in 1938. The first cars had been produced in Stuttgart. The car already had its distinctive round shape and air-cooled, flat-four, rear-mounted engine. The VW car was just one of many KdF programs, which included tours and outings. The prefix Volks ('people's') was not just applied to cars, but also to other products in Germany, such as the Volksempfänger radio receiver. On 28 May 1937, Gesellschaft zur Vorbereitung des Deutschen Volkswagens mbH ('company for the preparation of the German Volkswagen Ltd'), or Gezuvor (Note: Geh zuvor means 'go before' or 'go first'.) for short, was established in Berlin by the German Labour Front (Deutsche Arbeitsfront), the national labour organization of the Nazi Party. More than a year later, on 16 September 1938, it was renamed Volkswagenwerk GmbH.

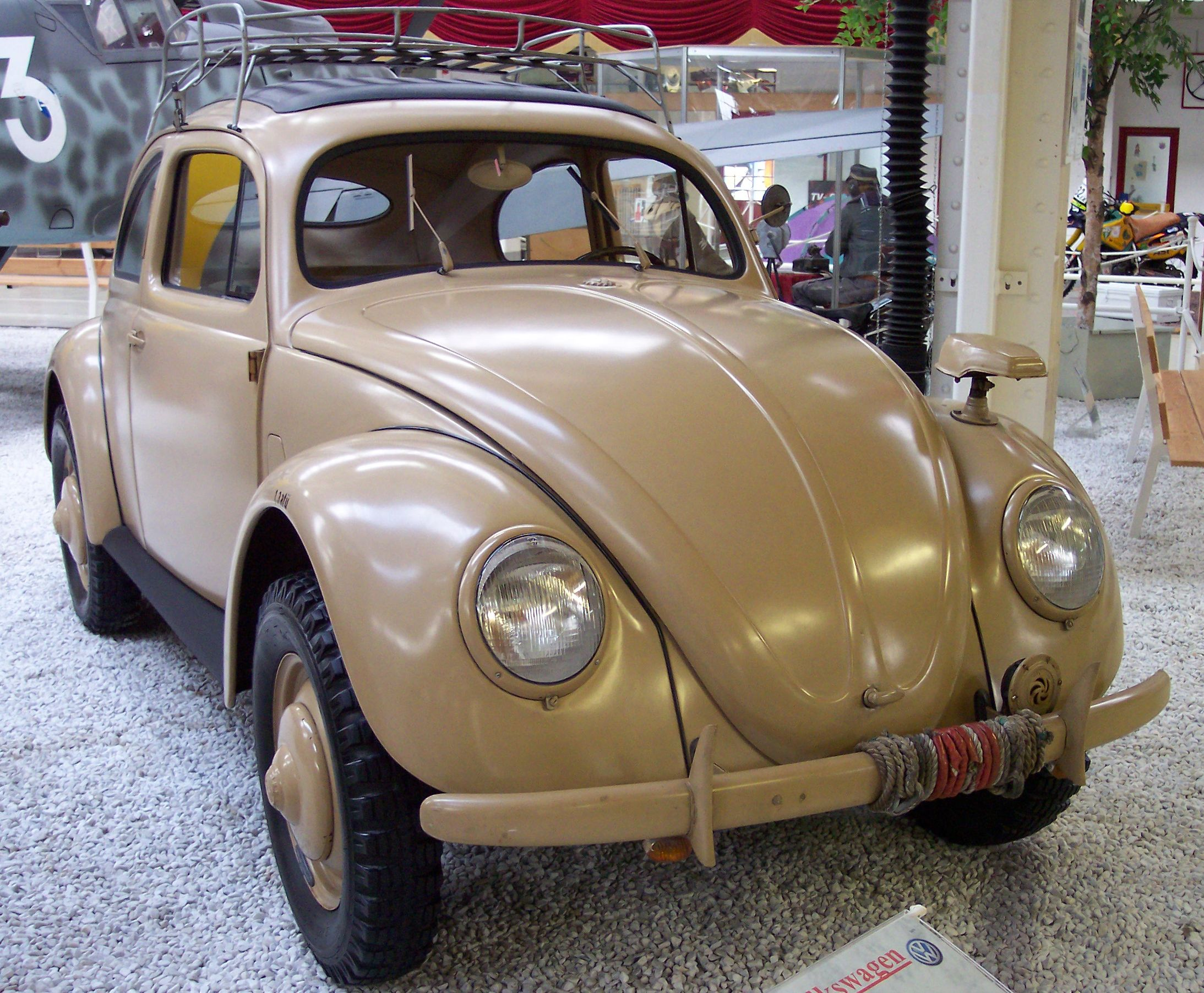
VW Type 82E

Erwin Komenda, the longstanding Auto Union chief designer, part of Ferdinand Porsche's hand-picked team, developed the car body of the prototype, which was recognisably the Beetle known today. It was one of the first cars designed with the aid of a wind tunnel – a method used for German aircraft design since the early 1920s. The car designs were put through rigorous tests and achieved a record-breaking 1.6 million kilometres (1 million miles) of testing before being deemed finished.

The construction of the new factory started in May 1938 in the new town of Stadt des KdF-Wagens (now known as Wolfsburg), which had been purpose-built for the factory workers. This factory had only produced a handful of cars by the time war started in 1939. None were actually delivered to any holder of the completed saving stamp books, though one Type 1 Cabriolet was presented to Hitler on 20 April 1944, his 55th birthday.

=== 1939–1944: Wartime production and Nazi concentration camp labour ===
World War II shifted the company's priorities to military vehicles manufactured for German forces: the Type 82 (Kübelwagen, 'bucket car') utility vehicle (VW's most common wartime model), and the Type 166 (Schwimmwagen, 'swim car'), the most-produced amphibious car in history. One of the first foreigners to drive a Volkswagen was Ernie Pyle, an American war correspondent who had the use of a captured Volkswagen for a few days after the Allied victory in Tunisia in May 1943. As was common with much of the production in Nazi Germany during the war, slave labour was utilised in the Volkswagen plant, such as from the Arbeitsdorf concentration camp. The company would admit in 1998 that it used 15,000 slaves during the war effort. German historians estimated that 80% of Volkswagen's wartime workforce was slave labour. Many of the slaves were reported to have been supplied from the concentration camps upon request from plant managers. A lawsuit was filed in 1998 by survivors for restitution for the forced labour. Volkswagen would set up a voluntary restitution fund.

=== 1945–1948: British military intervention ===
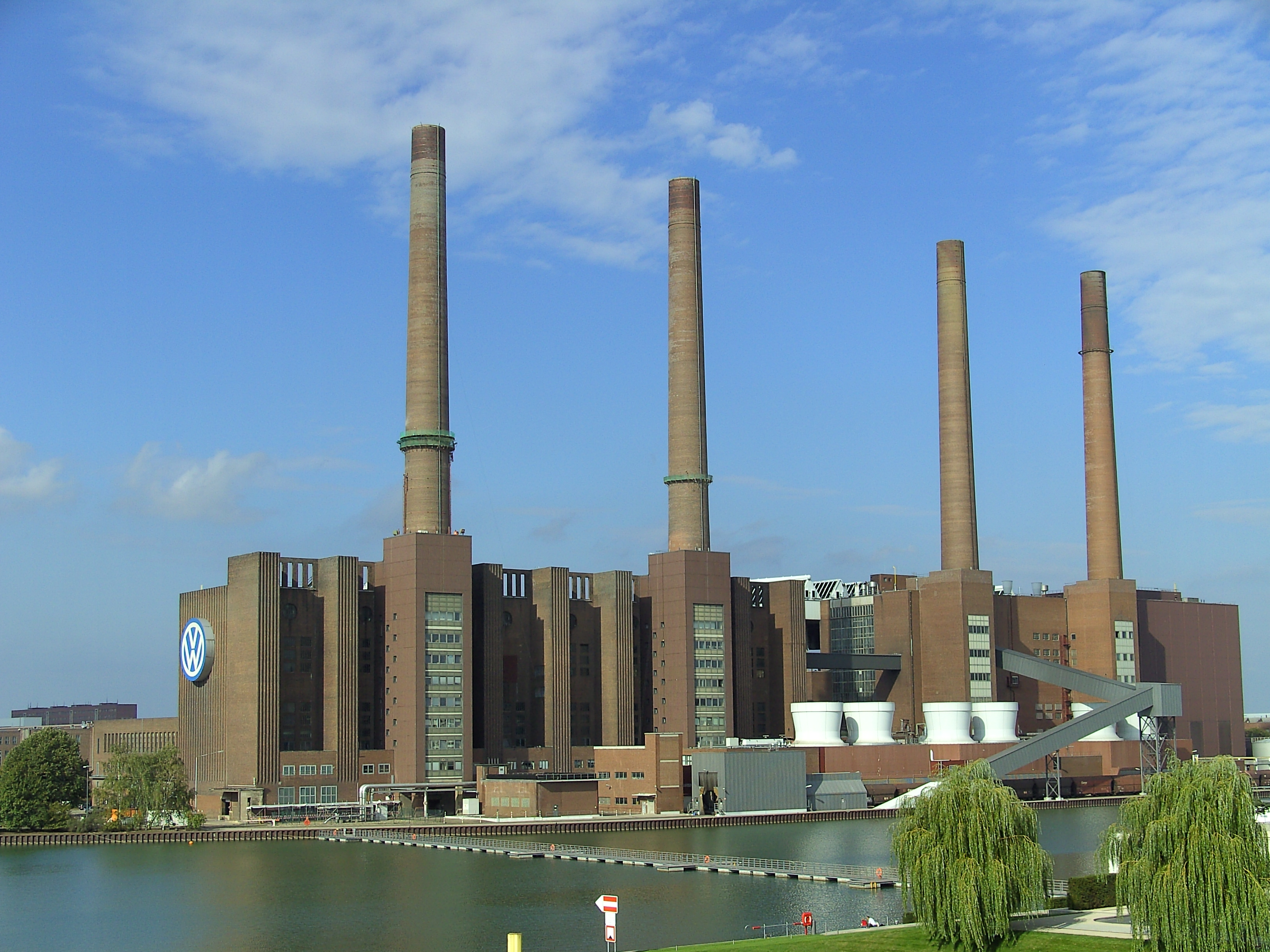
Volkswagen industrial plant in Wolfsburg, pictured in 2006

In April 1945, KdF-Stadt and its heavily bombed factory were captured by the U.S. Army and subsequently handed over to the British, within whose occupation zone the town and factory fell. The factory was placed under the control of British Army officer Major Ivan Hirst, REME, a civilian Military Governor with the occupying forces. One initial plan was to use it for military vehicle maintenance, and possibly dismantle and ship it to Britain. The equipment could have been salvaged as war reparations since the factory had been used for military production (though not of KdF-Wagens) and had been, in Hirst's words, a "political animal" rather than a commercial enterprise, technically making it liable for destruction under the terms of the Potsdam Agreement. Allied dismantling policy changed in late 1946 to mid-1947, though heavy industry continued to be dismantled until 1951.

One of the factory's wartime KdF-Wagen cars had been taken to the factory for repairs and abandoned there. Hirst had it repainted green and demonstrated it to British Army headquarters. In September 1945, the British Army, short of light transport, was persuaded to place a vital order for 20,000 cars. However, production facilities had been massively disrupted; there was a refugee crisis at and around the factory, and some parts (such as carburettors) were unavailable. Hirst and his German assistant Heinrich Nordhoff (who went on to run the Volkswagen factory after military involvement ended in 1949) helped to stabilise the acute social situation while simultaneously re-establishing production. Hirst, for example, used his engineering experience to arrange the manufacture of carburettors, the original producers being effectively "lost" in the Soviet zone. The first few hundred cars went to personnel from the occupying forces, and to the postal service. Some British service personnel were allowed to take their Beetles back to the UK when they were demobilised.

The post-war industrial plans for Germany set out rules that governed which industries Germany was allowed to retain. These rules set German car production at a maximum of 10% of 1936 car production. By 1946, the Volkswagen factory produced 1,000 cars a month, even though it was still in disrepair. Due to roof and window damage, production had to stop when it rained, and the company had to barter new vehicles for steel for production.

The car and its town changed their World War II-era names to "Volkswagen" and "Wolfsburg", respectively, and production increased. It was still unclear what was to become of the factory. It was offered to representatives from the American, Australian, British and French motor industries, who all rejected it. After an inspection of the plant, Sir William Rootes, head of the British Rootes Group, told Hirst that the project would fail within two years, and that the car "...is quite unattractive to the average motorcar buyer, is too ugly and too noisy. If you think you're going to build cars in this place, you're a bloody fool, young man." The official report said: "To build the car commercially would be a completely uneconomic enterprise."

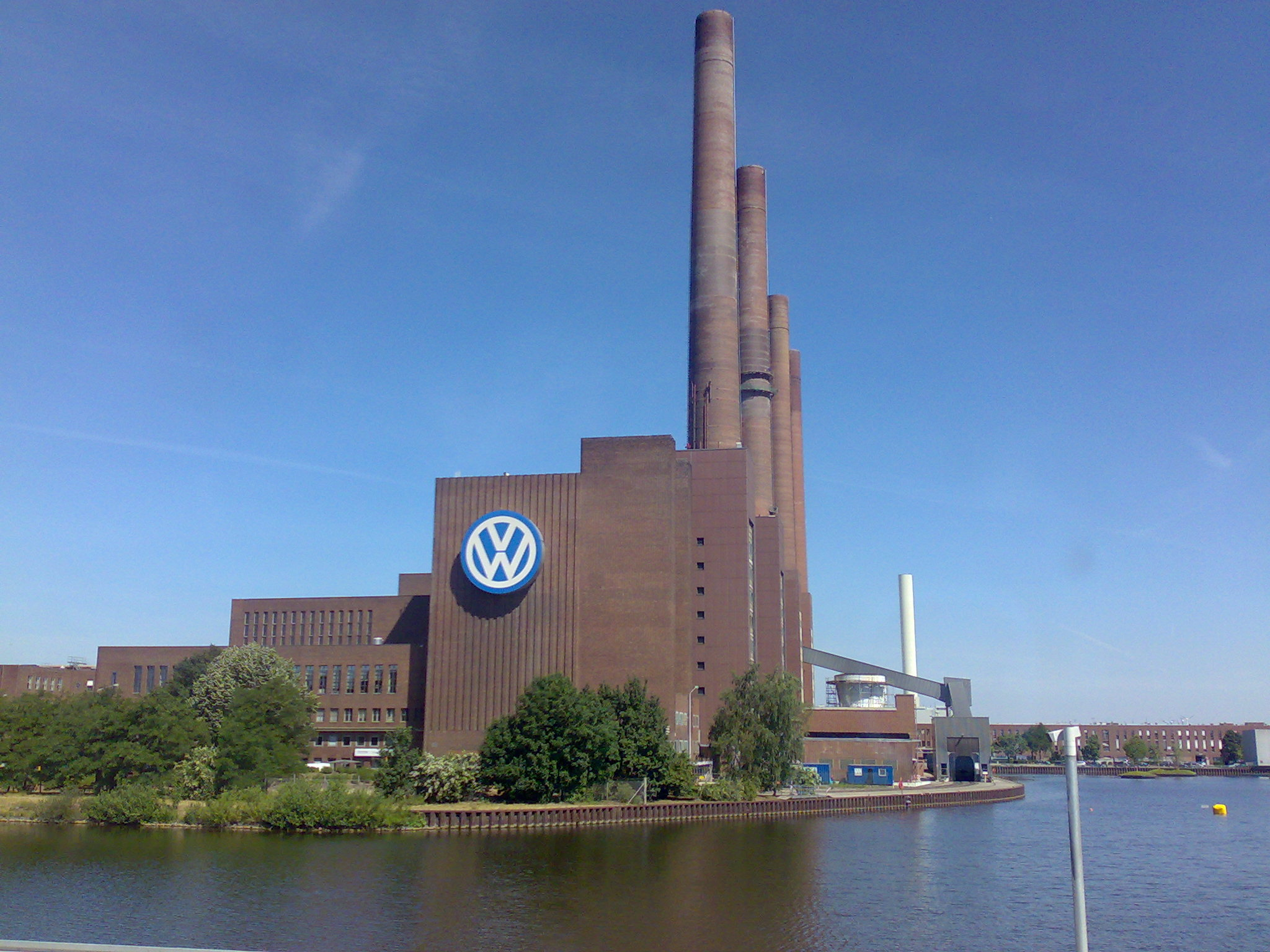
Volkswagen cogeneration plant

American Ford representatives were equally critical. In March 1948, the British offered the Volkswagen company to Ford free of charge. Henry Ford II, the son of Edsel Ford, traveled to West Germany for discussions. Heinz Nordhoff was also present, as well as Ernest Breech, Ford's chairman of the board. Henry Ford II looked to Breech for his opinion, and Breech said, "Mr. Ford, I don't think what we're being offered here is worth a damn!" Ford passed on the offer, leaving Volkswagen to rebuild itself under Nordhoff's leadership.

=== 1948–1961: Icon of post-war West Germany ===
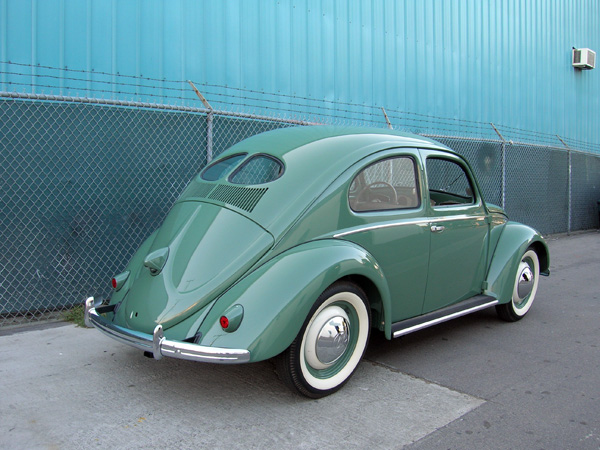
1949 Volkswagen "split rear window" Sedan

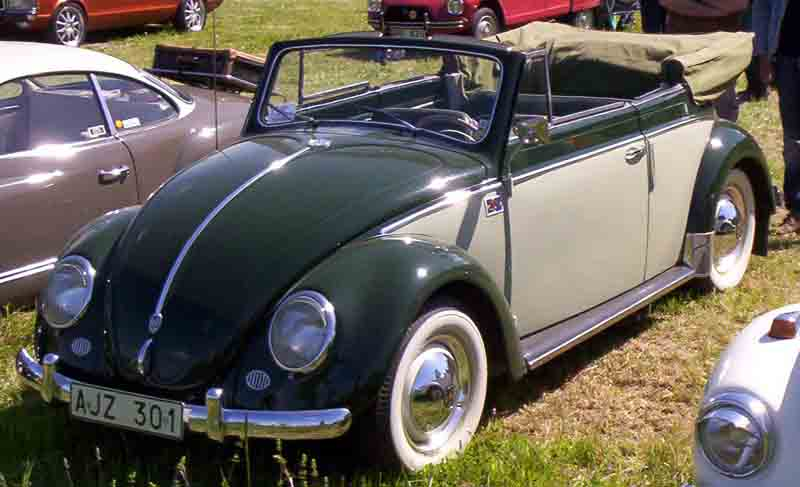
Volkswagen Cabriolet (1953)

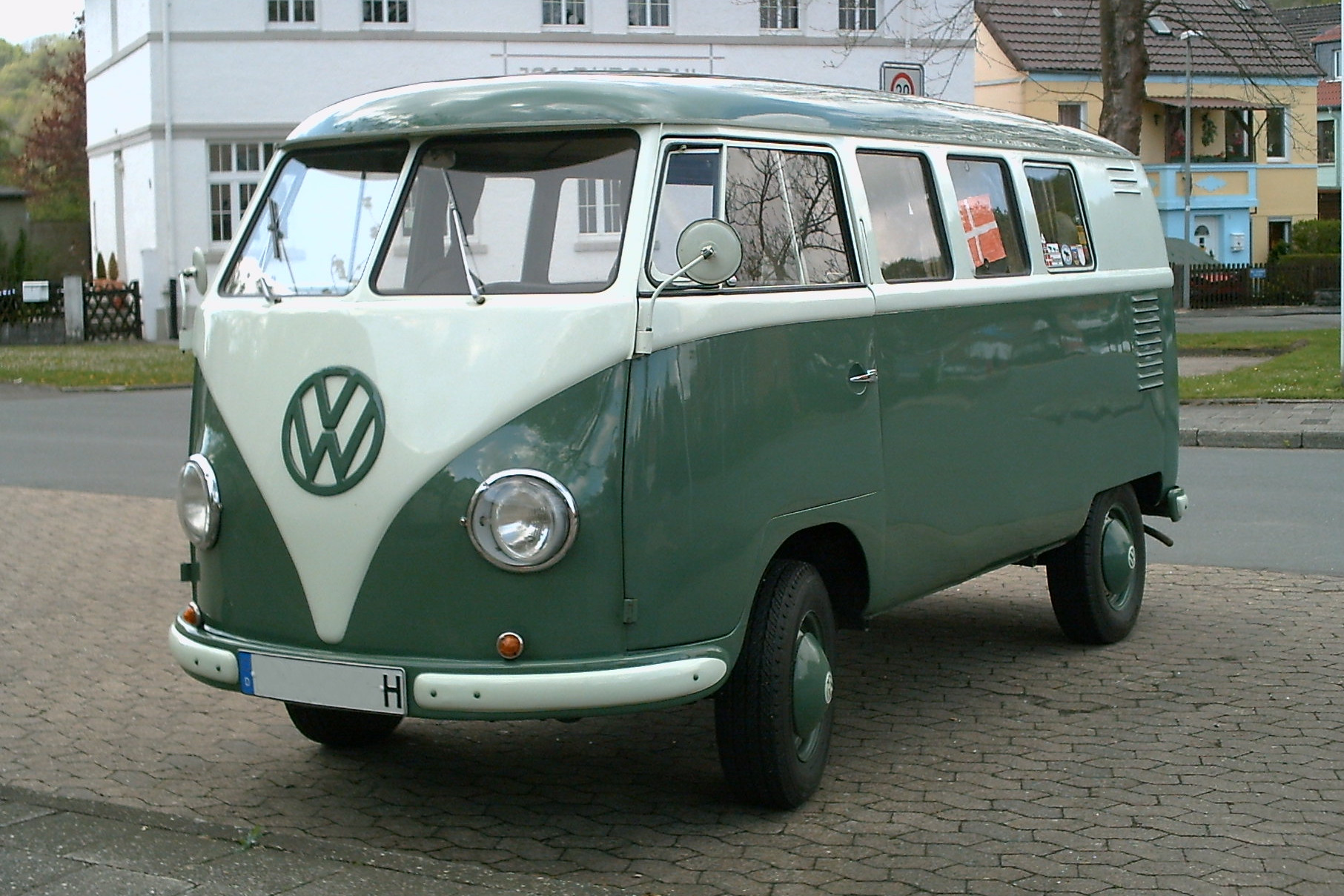
Volkswagen Type 2 (T1)

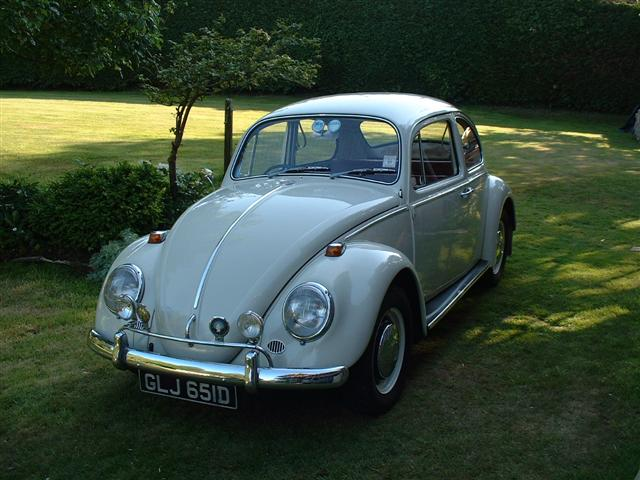
An original 1300 Deluxe, c. 1966

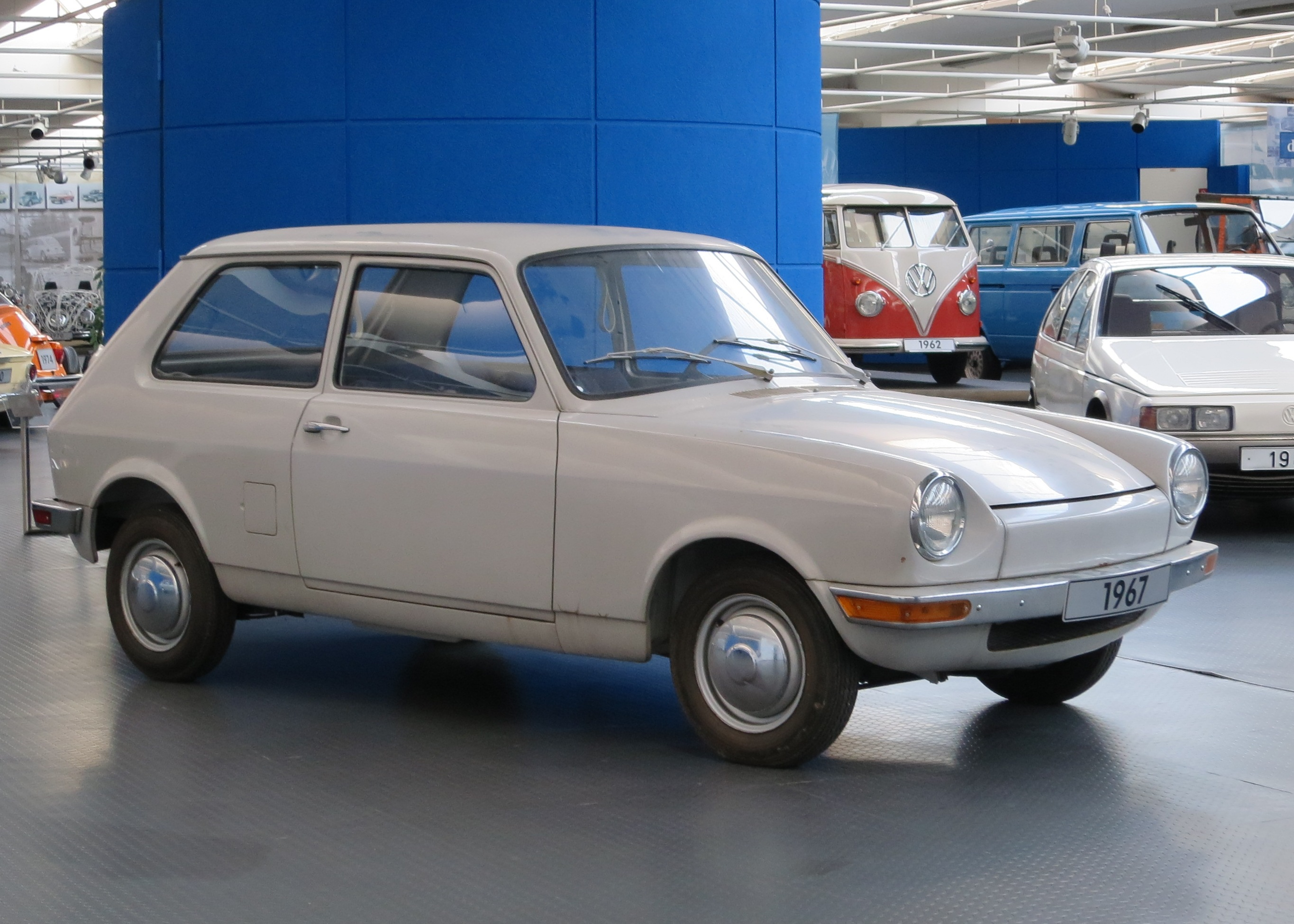
In the later 1960s, as worldwide demand for the Beetle began to diminish, a variety of successor designs were proposed and in most cases rejected by management.

From 1948 onwards, Volkswagen became an important element, symbolically and economically, of West German regeneration. Heinrich Nordhoff, a former senior manager at Opel who had overseen civilian and military vehicle production in the 1930s and 1940s, was recruited to run the factory in 1948. In 1949, Major Hirst left the company, which had been reformed as a trust controlled by the West German government and the government of the state of Lower Saxony. Apart from the introduction of the Volkswagen Type 2 commercial vehicle (van, pick-up, and camper) and the Karmann Ghia sports car, Nordhoff pursued a "one-model" policy of focusing on the Type 1 "Beetle" sedan until shortly before his death in 1968.

Volkswagens were first exhibited and sold in the United States in 1949, but sold only two units in the region that first year. On entry to the US market, the VW was briefly sold as a Victory Wagon. In April 1955, Volkswagen of America was formed to standardise sales and service in the US. Production of the Type 1 Volkswagen Beetle increased dramatically over the years, the total reaching one million in 1955.

The UK's first official Volkswagen importer, Colborne Garages of Ripley, Surrey, started business with importing parts for the models brought home by soldiers returning from Germany.

Canadian Motors, Limited brought in Canada's first shipment of Volkswagens on 10 July 1952 (shipping order 143075). The order consisted of 12 vehicles:

- three model 11C, a black, a green, and a sand colour
- three 11GS, a chestnut brown and two azure blue
- two 24A-M51 in red
- one 21A in blue
- one 23A in blue
- one 22A beige colour
- one ambulance

Volkswagens were seen in Canada for the first time at the Canadian National Exhibition in August 1952, and were accepted enthusiastically (at least one Type 2 bus from this order still exists, and is currently in France undergoing restoration). The first shipment for Volkswagen Canada reached Toronto in early December 1952 (at least one Type 1 from this first shipment still exists, and was driven on a nationwide tour for Volkswagen Canada's 60th year of business festivities in 2012).

By 1955, sales warranted the building of the Volkswagen plant on a 13-hectare (32-acre) site on Scarborough's Golden Mile. To this, a 5,600-square-metre (60,000 sq ft) building with administration, showrooms, service, repairs and parts was built in 1957, with storage for $4,000,000 of parts.

In 1959, VW started production at a plant near São Paulo in Brazil. Volkswagen do Brasil was accused of spying on workers during the time of the military dictatorship in the 1970s and informing police on oppositional activities. In 1976, mass arrests occurred and some VW employees were tortured. In 1979, Brazilian VW workers travelled to Wolfsburg to inform the CEO in person. In 2015, activists and former VW employees in Brazil spoke out in public and accused the company of being silent about the persecution of its workers. In 2016, VW commissioned an expert review of the situation due at the end of 2017.

On 22 August 1960, Volkswagenwerk GmbH was renamed Volkswagenwerk AG. Sales soared throughout the 1960s, peaking at the end of the decade thanks in part to the famous advertising campaigns by New York advertising agency Doyle Dane Bernbach. Led by art director Helmut Krone and copywriters Julian Koenig and Bob Levinson, Volkswagen advertisements became as popular as the car, using crisp layouts and witty copy to lure younger, sophisticated consumers with whom the car became associated. Even though it was almost universally known as the Beetle (or the Bug), it was never officially labelled as such by the manufacturer, instead referred to as the Type 1.

Although the car was becoming outdated during the 1960s and early 1970s, American exports, innovative advertising, and a growing reputation for reliability helped production figures surpass the levels of the previous record holder, the Ford Model T. On 17 February 1972, the 15,007,034th Beetle was sold. Volkswagen could now claim the world production record for the most-produced, single make of car in history. By 1973, total production was over 16 million.

To commemorate its passing the Ford Model T's record sales mark and its victories in the Baja 1000 Mexican races from 1967 to 1971, Volkswagen produced its first limited edition Beetle, marketed as the "Baja Champion SE" in the United States and as the "Marathon" Superbeetle in the rest of the world. It featured unique "Marathon Blau" metallic blue paint, steel-pressed 10-spoke 38-centimetre (15 in) magnesium-alloy wheels, a commemorative metal plate mounted on the glovebox, and a certificate of authenticity presented to the original purchaser. Dealer-installed options for this limited edition Superbeetle included the following: white stripes running the length of the rocker-panel, a special shifter knob, bumper overriders, tapered exhaust tips, fake walnut inserts in the dashboard (behind the steering wheel and the glovebox cover), as well as Bosch fog lights mounted on the front bumper.

=== 1961–1973: Beetle to Golf ===
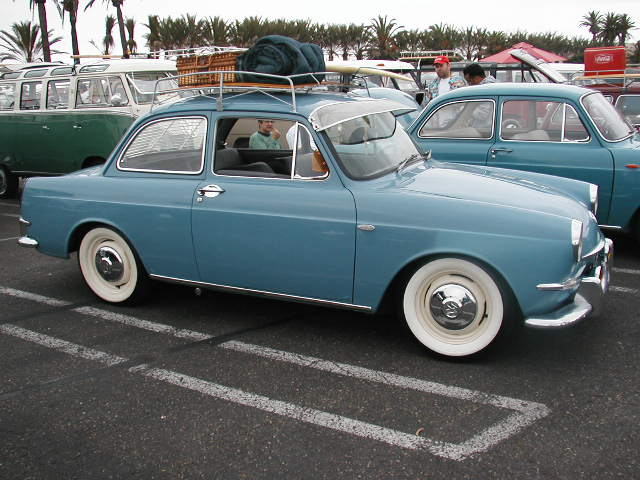
A 1963 VW Type 3 Notchback

The 1961 Type 1 Beetle had a 27 kW (36 hp) 1,200 cc (73 cu in) four cylinder air-cooled flat-four opposed OHV engine made of aluminum alloy block and heads. By 1966, the Type 1 came with a 1,300 cc (79 cu in) engine. By 1967, the Type 1 had a 1,500 cc (92 cu in) engine, and 1,600 cc (98 cu in) in 1970. The air-cooled engine lost favour in the United States market with the advent of unleaded petrol and smog controls. These air-cooled engines were commonly tuned to be fuel-rich in order to control engine over-heating, and this led to excessive carbon monoxide emissions. VW production equipment was eventually moved to Mexico where vehicle emissions were not regulated. Beetles were popular on the US West Coast, where the limited-capacity cabin heating was less inconvenient. Beetles were popularised on the US West Coast as beach buggies and dune buggies.

VW expanded its product line in 1961 with the introduction of four Type 3 models (Karmann Ghia, Notchback, Fastback, and Variant) based on the new Type 3 mechanical underpinnings. The name 'Squareback' was used in the United States for the Variant.

In 1969, the larger Type 4 (411 and 412) models were introduced. These differed substantially from previous vehicles, with the notable introduction of monocoque/unibody construction, the option of a fully automatic transmission, electronic fuel injection, and a sturdier powerplant.

Volkswagen acquired Auto Union in 1964 and NSU Motorenwerke AG (NSU) in 1969. The former company owned the historic Audi brand, which had disappeared after World War II. VW ultimately merged Auto Union and NSU to create the modern Audi company, and would go on to develop it as its luxury vehicle marque. The purchase of Auto Union and NSU was a pivotal point in Volkswagen's history, as both companies yielded the technological expertise that proved necessary for VW to survive when demand for its air-cooled models declined.

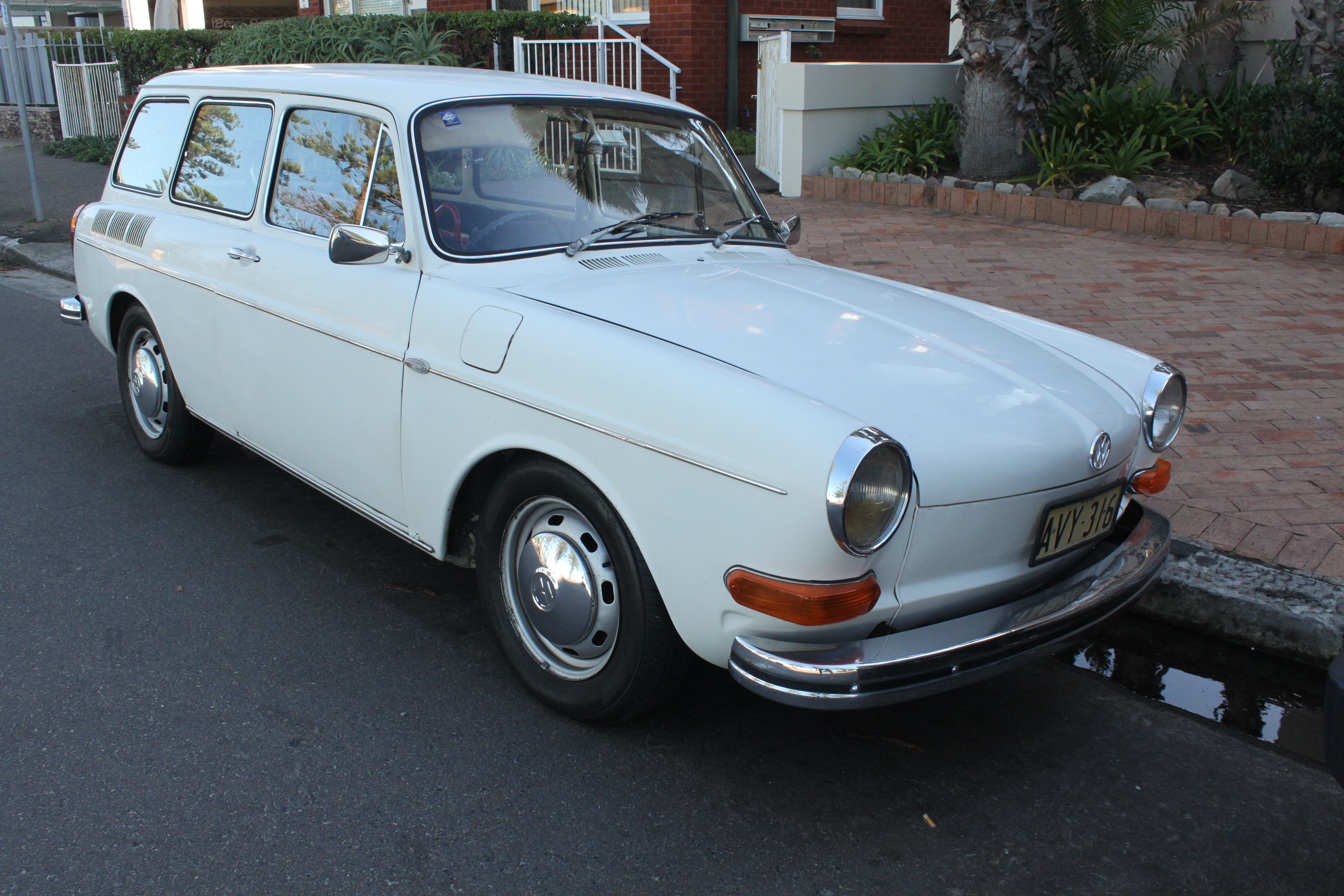
1970 VW Squareback (Type III)

Volkswagen added a "Super Beetle" (the Type 131) to its lineup in 1971. The Type 131 differed from the standard Beetle in its use of a MacPherson strut front suspension instead of the usual torsion bars. The Super Beetle featured a new hooded, padded dash and curved windshield (from 1973 model year on up). Rack and pinion steering replaced recirculating ball steering gears in the model year 1975 and up. The front of the car was stretched 51 millimetres (2 in) to allow the spare tire to lie flat, and the combination of these two features increased the usable front luggage space.

In 1973, Volkswagen introduced the military-themed Type 181, known as the "Trekker" in Europe and the "Thing" in America, recalling the wartime Type 82. The military version was produced for the NATO-era German Army during the Cold War years of 1970 to 1979. The US Thing version only sold for two years, 1973 and 1974.

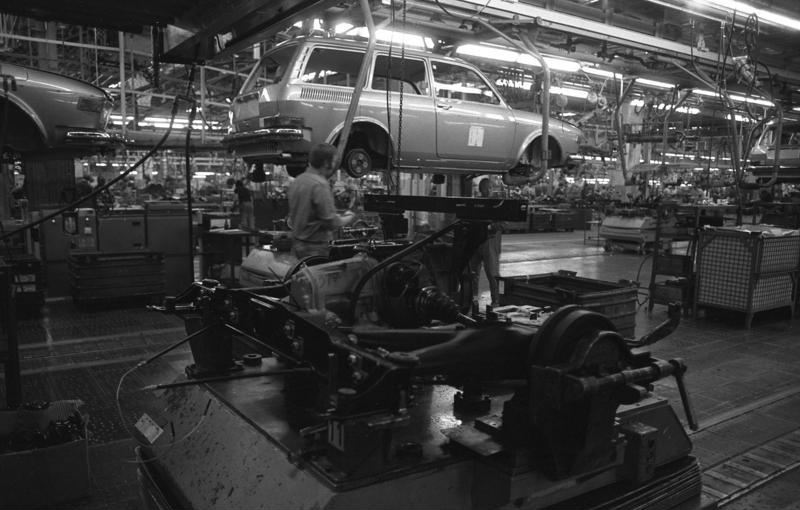
Volkswagen Type 4 assembly line in Wolfsburg as of 1973

By late 1972, Volkswagen had decided to cancel the nearly finished typ 266, a project for a mid-engined car to replace the Beetle, and to focus on front-wheel-drive, water-cooled cars. Rudolf Leiding, recently made head of Volkswagen, cited noise, heat, and servicing problems with the mid-engine layout, as well as the difficulty of making it a station wagon.

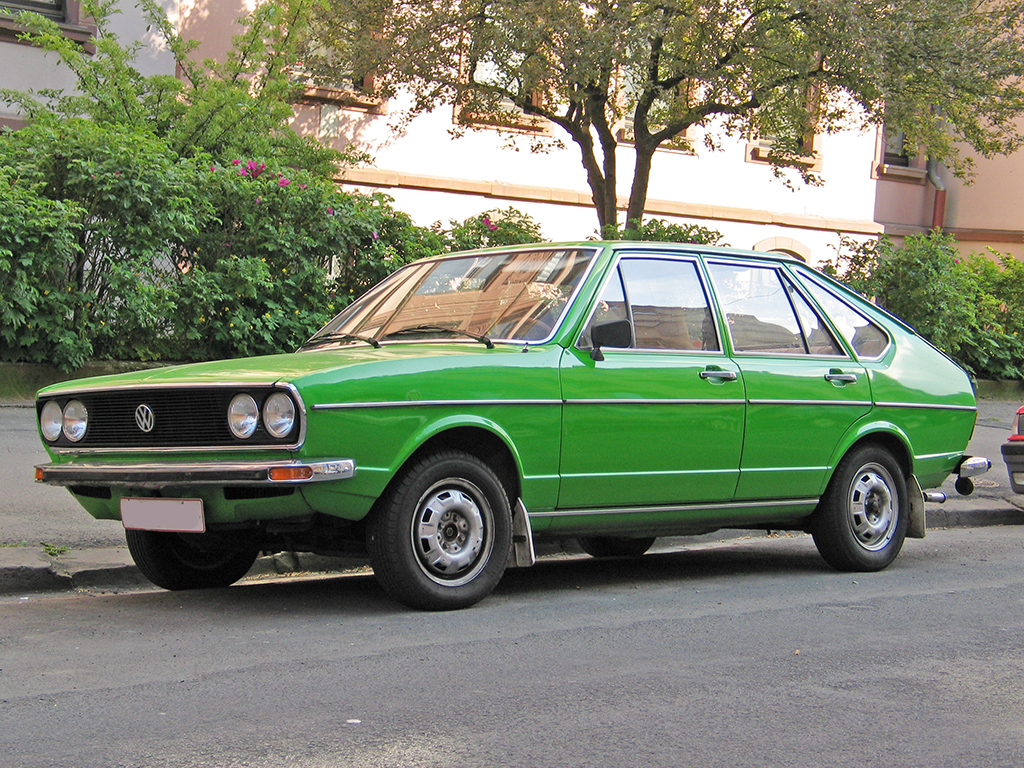
Volkswagen Passat (1973–1977 model)

Volkswagen was in serious trouble by 1973. The Type 3 and Type 4 models had sold in much smaller numbers than the Beetle and the NSU-based K70 also failed to sell. Beetle sales had started to decline rapidly in European and North American markets. The company knew that Beetle production had to end, but faced a conundrum of how to replace it. VW's ownership of Audi and Auto Union proved beneficial. Its expertise in front-wheel drive, and water-cooled engines would help Volkswagen produce a credible Beetle successor. Audi influences paved the way for this new generation of Volkswagens: the Passat, Scirocco, Golf, and Polo.

First in the series was the Volkswagen Passat (known as the Dasher in the US), introduced in 1973, a fastback version of the Audi 80, using many identical body and mechanical parts. Estate/wagon versions were available in many markets. In Europe, the estate/wagon version dominated market share for many years.

The Scirocco followed in 1974, designed by Giorgetto Giugiaro. Based on the platform of the not yet released Golf, it was built at Karmann due to capacity constraints at Volkswagen.

The pivotal model emerged as the Volkswagen Golf in 1974, marketed in the United States and Canada as the Rabbit for the first generation (1975–1985) and fifth generation (2006–2009). Its angular styling was again designed by Giorgetto Giugiaro. Its design followed trends for small family cars set by the 1959 Mini – the Golf had a transversely mounted, water-cooled engine in the front, driving the front wheels, and had a hatchback, a format that has dominated the market segment ever since. Beetle production at Wolfsburg ended upon the Golf's introduction. It continued in smaller numbers at other German factories (Hanover and Emden) until 1978, but mainstream production shifted to Brazil and Mexico.

In 1975, the Volkswagen Polo followed. It was a re-badged Audi 50, which was soon discontinued in 1978. The Polo became the base of the Volkswagen Derby, which was introduced in 1977. The Derby was, for all intents and purposes, a three-box design of the Polo. After a second model generation, the Derby was discontinued in 1985, although the body style lived on in the form of the Polo classic/Polo saloon until 1991.

The Passat, Scirocco, Golf, and Polo shared many character-defining features, as well as parts and engines. They built the basis for Volkswagen's turn-around.

=== 1974–1990: Product line expansion ===
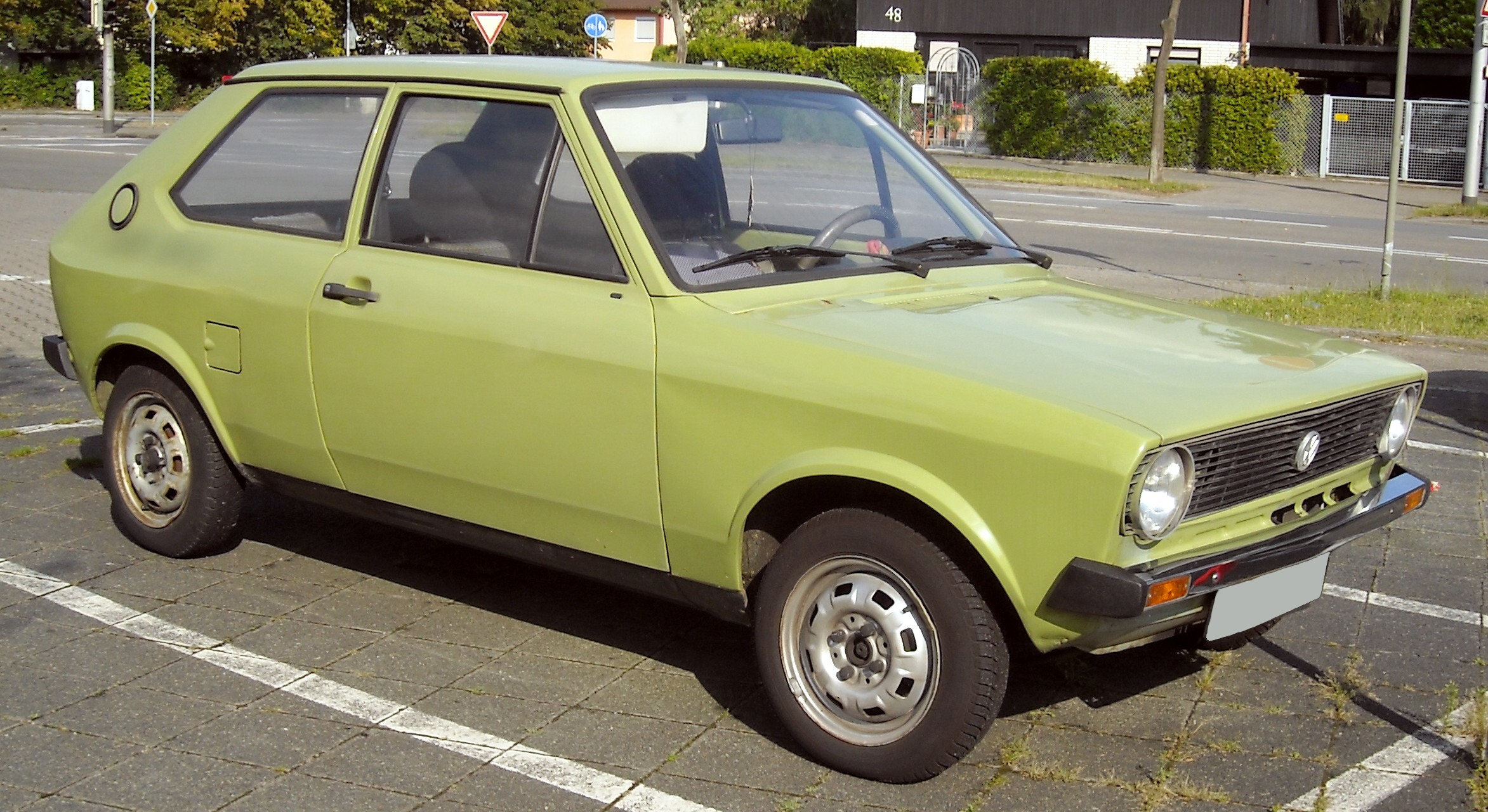
Volkswagen Polo Mk1 (1975–1979 model)

While Volkswagen's range of cars soon became similar to that of other large European car makers, the Golf has been the mainstay of the Volkswagen line-up since its introduction, as well as the mechanical basis for several other cars from the company. There have been eight generations of the Golf, the first generation of which (sold as the Rabbit in the United States and Canada and as the Caribe in Latin America) was produced from the summer of 1974 until the autumn of 1983. Its chassis also spawned the Scirocco sport coupe, the Jetta saloon/sedan, the Golf Cabriolet convertible, and the Caddy pick-up. North American production of the Rabbit commenced at the Volkswagen Westmoreland Assembly Plant near New Stanton, Pennsylvania in 1978. It would be produced in the United States as the Rabbit until the spring of 1984. The second-generation Golf hatchback ran from 1983 until the autumn of 1991, and a North American version produced at Westmoreland Assembly went on sale at the start of the 1985 model year. The production numbers of the first-generation Golf have continued to grow annually in South Africa as the Citi Golf, with only minor modifications to the interior, engine, and chassis, using tooling relocated from the New Stanton plant when that site began to build the second-generation model. The second-generation Jetta sedan was produced from early 1984 to 1992.

In the 1980s, Volkswagen's sales in the United States and Canada fell dramatically, despite the success of models like the Golf elsewhere. Sales in the US were 293,595 in 1980, but were down to 177,709 by 1984. The introduction of the second-generation Golf, GTI, and Jetta models helped Volkswagen briefly in North America. Motor Trend magazine named the GTI its Car of the Year for 1985, and Volkswagen rose to eighth place in the J.D. Power buyer satisfaction ratings in 1985, up from 22nd place a year earlier. VW's American sales broke 200,000 in 1985 and 1986 before resuming the downward trend from earlier in the decade. Chairman Carl Hahn decided to expand the company elsewhere (mostly in developing countries), and the New Stanton factory closed on 14 July 1988. Meanwhile, four years after signing a cooperation agreement with the Spanish car maker SEAT in 1982, Hahn expanded the company by purchasing a majority share of SEAT up to 75% by the end of 1986, which VW bought outright in 1990. On 4 July 1985, Volkswagenwerk AG was renamed Volkswagen AG.

In 1975, Volkswagen entered the supermini market with the Polo, a stylish, spacious three-door hatchback designed by Bertone. It was a strong seller in West Germany and most of the rest of Western Europe, being one of the first foreign small cars to prove popular in Britain. It had started out in 1974 as the Audi 50, which was only available in certain markets and was less popular. The Polo entered a market sector already being dominated by the Fiat 127 and Renault 5, and which before long would also include the Austin Metro and Ford Fiesta.

In 1981, the second-generation Polo launched as a hatchback (resembling a small estate car). The range was expanded in 1983, with the introduction of a Coupe (similar to a conventional hatchback), and the Classic (a two-door saloon). The Polo's practicality, despite the lack of a five-door version, helped ensure even stronger sales than its predecessor. It continued to sell well after a facelift in 1990, finally being replaced by a new version in 1994. Also arriving in 1981 were the second generation of the larger Passat and a second generation of the Scirocco coupe.

In 1983, the Golf Mk2 was launched. At the beginning of 1988, the third generation Passat was the next major car launch. Volkswagen did not produce a hatchback version of this Passat, despite the rising popularity of the hatchback body style throughout Europe. Just after launching the B3 Passat, Volkswagen launched the Corrado, analogous to the Scirocco, although the Scirocco remained in production until 1992; a third generation of Scirocco was in production between 2008 and 2017.

=== 1991–1999 ===
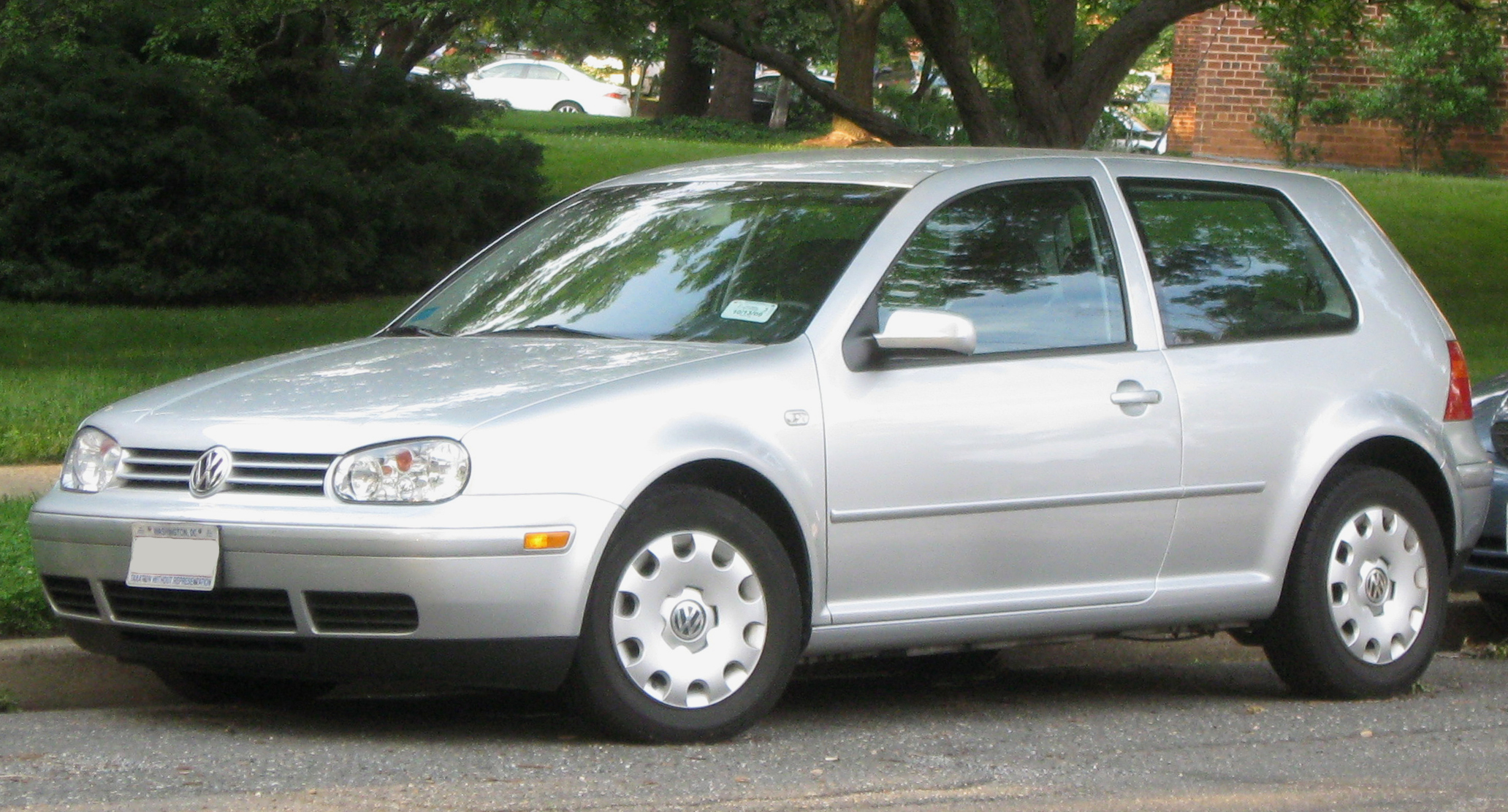
Volkswagen Golf, in North American form

In 1991, Volkswagen launched the third-generation Golf, which won European Car of the Year for 1992. The Golf Mk3 and Jetta Mk3 arrived in North America in 1993. The sedan version of the Golf was badged as the Vento in Europe, but retained the Jetta name in the US. The Scirocco and the later Corrado were both Golf-based coupés.

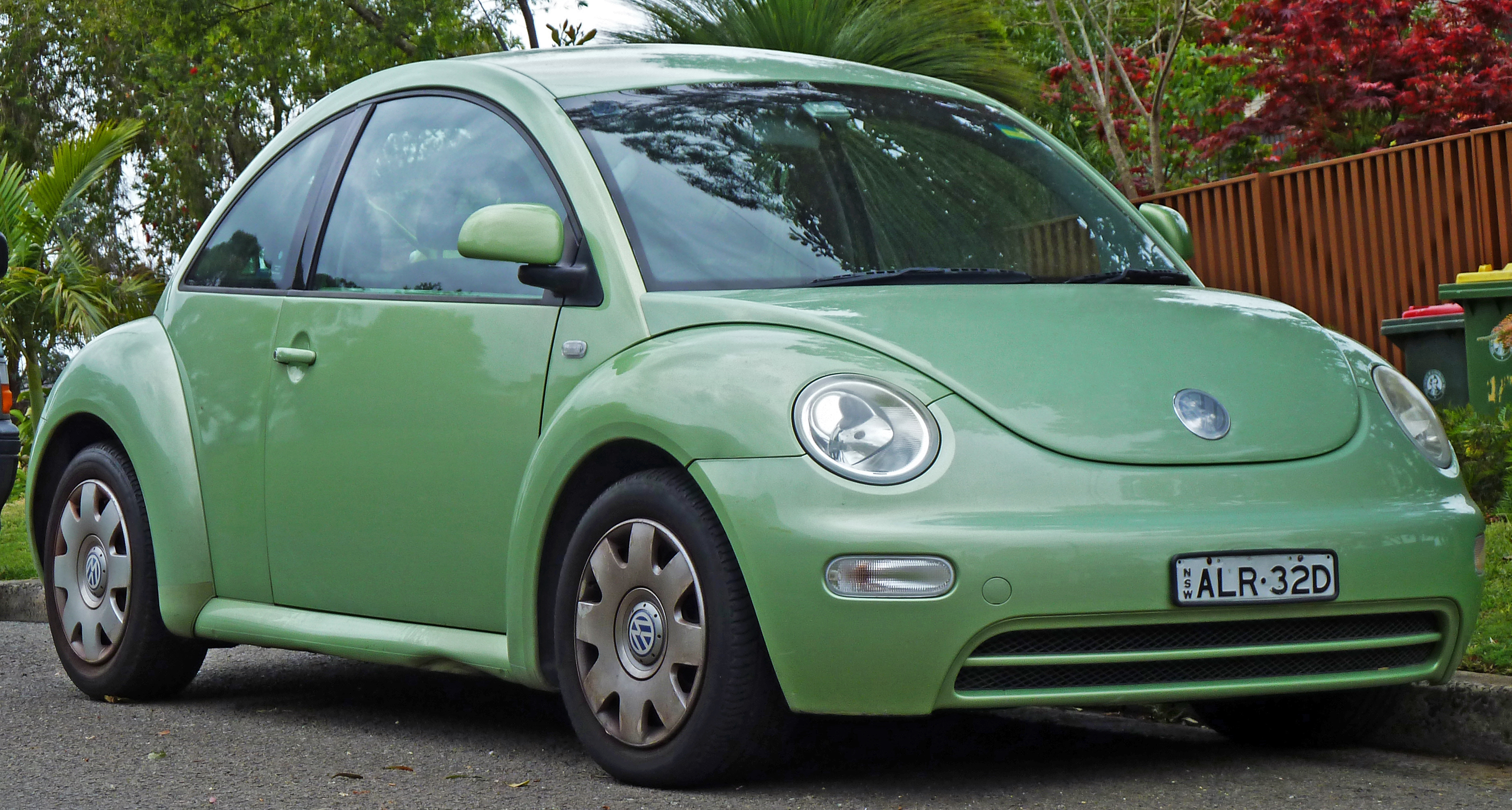
The Volkswagen New Beetle

In 1994, Volkswagen unveiled the J Mays-designed Concept One, a "retro"-themed concept car with a resemblance to the original Beetle, based on the platform of the Polo. Due to a positive response to the concept, a production version was developed as the New Beetle, based on the Golf's larger platform.

In 1995, the Sharan was launched in Europe, the result of a joint venture with Ford, which also resulted in the Ford Galaxy and SEAT Alhambra.

The company's evolution of its model range continued with the Golf Mk4, introduced at the end of 1997 (North America in 1999). Its chassis spawned a host of other cars within the Volkswagen group: the Volkswagen Bora (the sedan known as the Jetta in the United States), SEAT Toledo, SEAT León, Audi A3, Audi TT, and Škoda Octavia. Other main models during the decade include the Polo, a smaller car than the Golf, and the larger Passat for the segment above the Golf.

In 1998, the company launched the new Lupo city car. In 1999, it announced the first "3-litre" car, a lightweight version of the Lupo that could travel 100 km (62 mi) with only 3 L (0.79 US gal), or 78 mpg_{‑US}, of diesel – making it the world's most fuel efficient car at the time.

=== 2000–2016: Further expansion ===
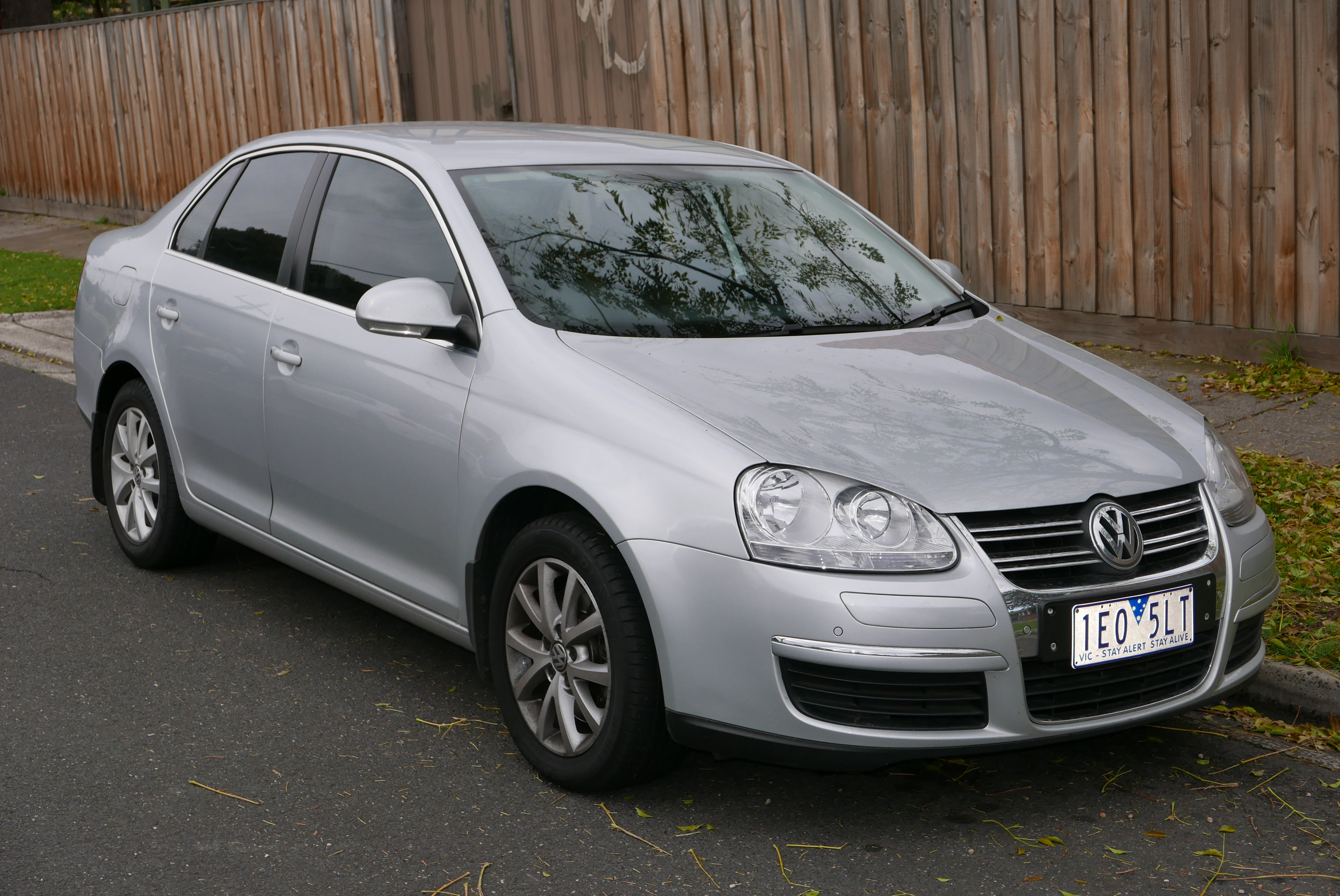
The fifth generation Volkswagen Jetta

Volkswagen began introducing an array of new models after Bernd Pischetsrieder became Volkswagen Group CEO (responsible for all VW brands) in 2002. The sixth-generation Volkswagen Golf launched in 2008, and came runner-up to the Opel/Vauxhall Insignia in the 2009 European Car of the Year. It has spawned several cousins: VW Jetta, VW Scirocco, SEAT León, SEAT Toledo, Škoda Octavia and Audi A3 hatchback ranges, as well as a new mini-MPV, the SEAT Altea. The GTI, a "hot hatch" performance version of the Golf, has a 2.0 L Turbocharged Fuel Stratified Injection (FSI) direct injection engine. VW began marketing the Golf under the Rabbit name once again in the US and Canada in 2006.

The sixth-generation Passat and the fifth-generation Jetta both debuted in 2005, and Volkswagen announced plans to expand its lineup further by bringing back the Scirocco by 2008. Other models in Wolfgang Bernhard's (Volkswagen brand CEO) "product offensive" include the Tiguan mid-sized SUV in 2008 and a Passat Coupé. In November 2006, Bernd Pischetsrieder announced his resignation as Volkswagen Group CEO, and was replaced by Audi worldwide CEO Martin Winterkorn at the beginning of 2007.

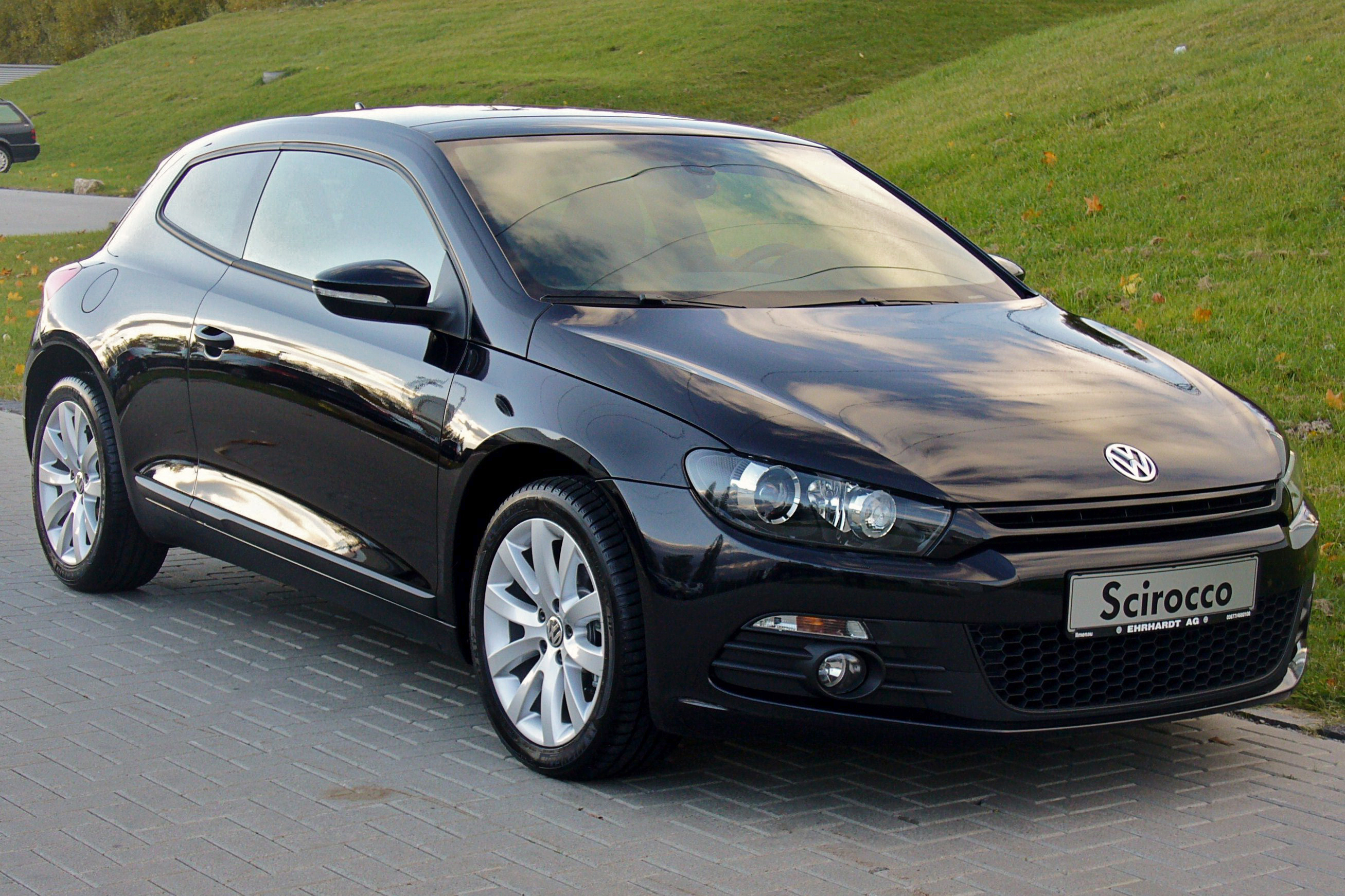
The third generation Volkswagen Scirocco

Volkswagen maintained North American sales of 224,195 in 2005. The momentum continued for fiscal year 2006, as Volkswagen's North American sales for the year were 235,140 vehicles, a 4.9 per cent increase over 2005, despite a slump in domestic North American manufacturer's sales. In conjunction with the introduction of new models, the production location of Volkswagen vehicles also underwent a great change. The 2007 Eos, a hardtop convertible, is produced in a new facility in Portugal. All Golfs/Rabbits and GTIs as of 2006 are manufactured in Wolfsburg, Germany, rather than Puebla, Mexico, where Golfs and GTIs for the North American market were produced from 1989 to 1998, and the Brazilian factory in Curitiba, where Golfs and GTIs were produced from 1999 to 2006 (the Jetta has been primarily manufactured in Mexico since 1989). Volkswagen is also in the process of reconfiguring an automotive assembly plant in Belgium. The new models and investments in manufacturing improvements were immediately noticed by automotive critics. Favourable reviews for Volkswagen's newest cars include the GTI being named by Consumer Reports as the top sporty car under $25,000, one of Car and Driver magazine's "10 Best" for 2007, Automobile Magazine's 2007 Car of the Year, as well as a 2008 Motor Trend comparison ranking the mid-size Passat first in its class.

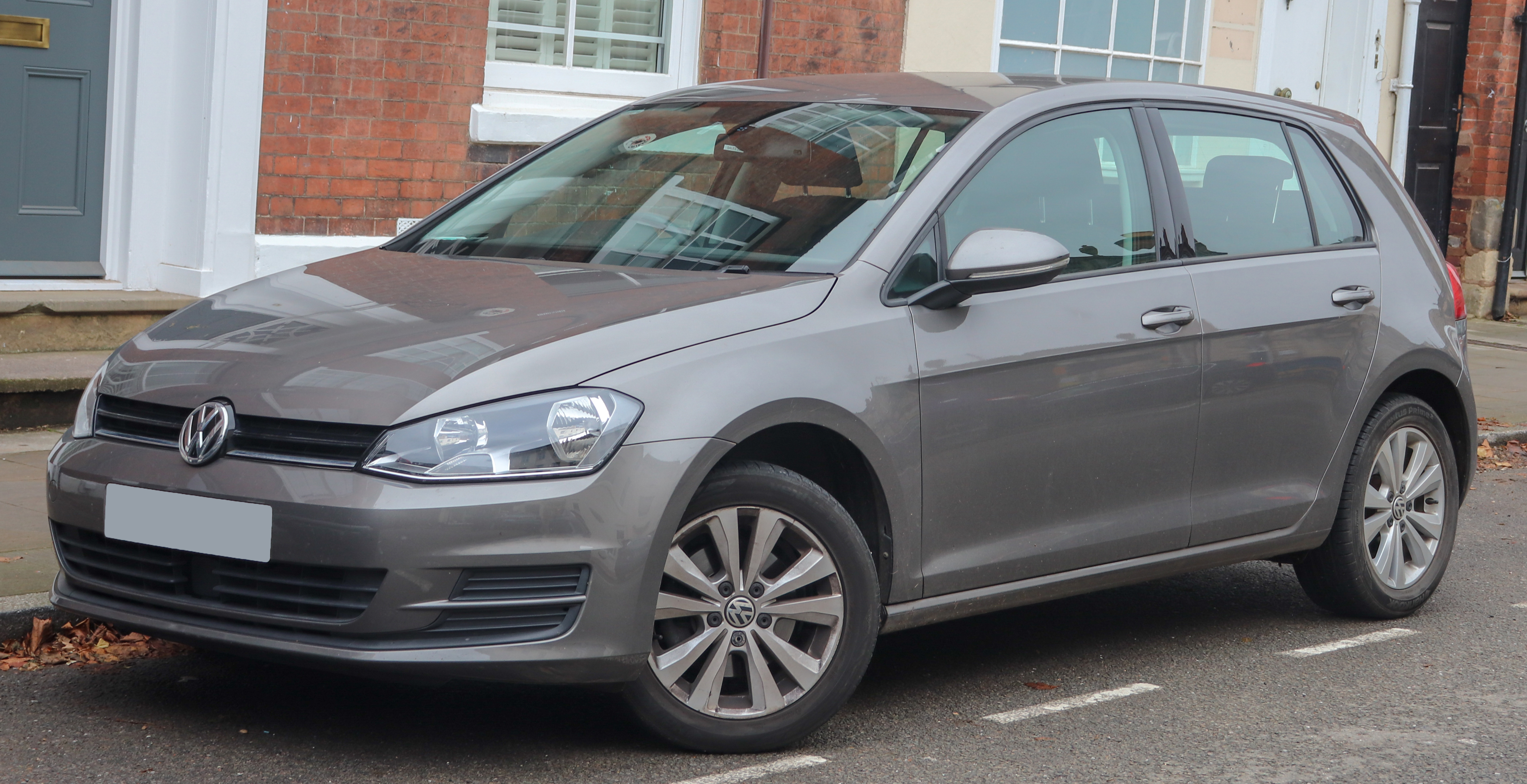
The seventh-generation Volkswagen Golf

Volkswagen partnered with Daimler AG and other companies to market the BlueTec clean diesel technology on cars and trucks from Mercedes-Benz, Volkswagen, and others. According to the United States Environmental Protection Agency, four of the ten most fuel-efficient vehicles available for sale in the US are powered by Volkswagen diesel engines. Volkswagen has offered a number of its vehicles with a TDI (Turbocharged Direct Injection) engine, which lends class-leading fuel economy to several models. They were a three-way tie for eighth (TDI Beetle, TDI Golf, TDI Jetta) and ninth, the TDI Jetta Wagon. In addition, all Volkswagen TDI diesel engines produced from 1996 to 2006 can be driven on 100% biodiesel fuel.

For the 2007 model year, however, strict US government emissions regulations had forced Volkswagen to drop most diesels from its US engine lineup, but a new lineup of diesel engines (then thought) compatible to US standards returned to the American market starting with the 2009 model year. These post-2009 clean diesel engines are limited to running on 5% (B5) biodiesel only to maintain Volkswagen's warranty. Volkswagen long resisted adding a SUV to its lineup, but relented with the introduction of the Touareg, made in partnership with Porsche, while they worked on the Porsche Cayenne and later the Audi Q7. Though acclaimed as a fine handling vehicle, the Touareg has been a modest seller at best, and it has been criticised by auto reviewers for its absence of a third-row seat, the relatively poor fuel economy, and the high vehicle mass. Volkswagen set plans to add a compact SUV with styling influences from the "Concept A" concept vehicle introduced at the 2006 Geneva Auto Show. On 20 July 2006, Volkswagen announced that the new vehicle would be called the Tiguan.

Since the discontinuation of the T4 in 2003 and the decision not to export the T5 to the United States, Volkswagen, coincidentally, lacked a van for its North American lineup. To remedy this, the company launched the Routan, a badge-engineered Dodge Grand Caravan made for the American and Canadian markets, in 2008.

In September 2006, Volkswagen began offering the City Golf and City Jetta only for the Canadian market. Both models were originally the Golf Mk4 and Jetta, but were later replaced with the Brazilian versions of the Golf Mk4 and Bora. Volkswagen's introduction of such models is seen as a test of the market for a subcompact and, if successful, may be the beginnings of a thriving subcompact market for Volkswagen.

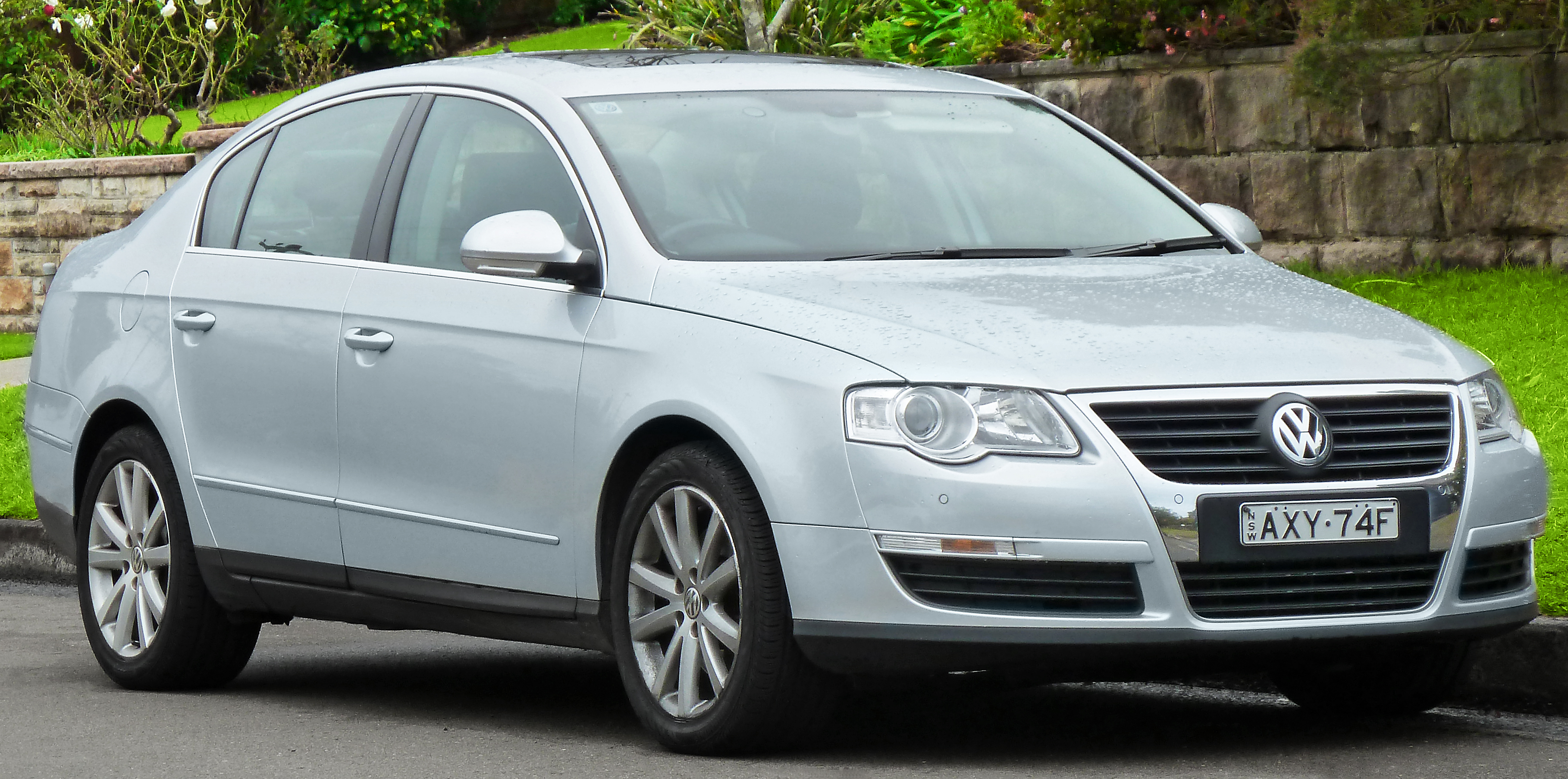
The Volkswagen Passat (3C)

In May 2011, Volkswagen completed the Chattanooga Assembly Plant in Chattanooga, Tennessee. The construction of the plant marked VW's first since the plant at New Stanton was closed in 1988. The Chattanooga facility has produced Volkswagen cars and SUVs specifically designed for the North American markets, beginning with the Passat B7 in 2011. The company recently announced plans to expand further by investing $900 million to add floor space to the factory.

The VW XL1 began a limited production run in 2013. The XL1 is a lightweight and fuel-efficient two-person vehicle (weighing only 795 kg or 1,753 lb).

On 14 September 2016, Volkswagen announced its partnership with three Israeli cybersecurity experts to create a new company, Cymotive, dedicated to automotive security.

==== Volkswagen emissions scandal ====
2015 saw the company engulfed in the Volkswagen emissions scandal, sometimes known as Dieselgate or Emissionsgate. The scandal began in September 2015, when the United States Environmental Protection Agency (EPA) issued a notice of violation of the Clean Air Act to the Volkswagen Group. The agency had found that Volkswagen had intentionally programmed turbocharged direct injection (TDI) diesel engines to activate their emissions controls only during laboratory emissions testing, which caused the vehicles' NO_{x} output to meet US standards during regulatory testing. However, the vehicles emitted up to 40 times more NO_{x} in real-world driving. Volkswagen deployed this software in about 11 million cars worldwide, including 500,000 in the United States, in model years 2009 through 2015.

In June 2016, Volkswagen agreed to a settlement of up to $14.7 billion to resolve allegations of cheating emissions tests and deceiving customers on 2.0-liter diesel vehicles. The settlement included provisions for Volkswagen to buy back or modify affected vehicles, compensate consumers, and invest in environmental mitigation and zero-emission vehicle technology. This agreement represented one of the largest consumer class-action settlements in US history.

The Volkswagen Atlas, a large crossover SUV, began production in late 2016, and aimed to help end several years of losses for Volkswagen in the United States, the world's second largest auto market.

=== 2017–present: Focus on electric vehicles ===
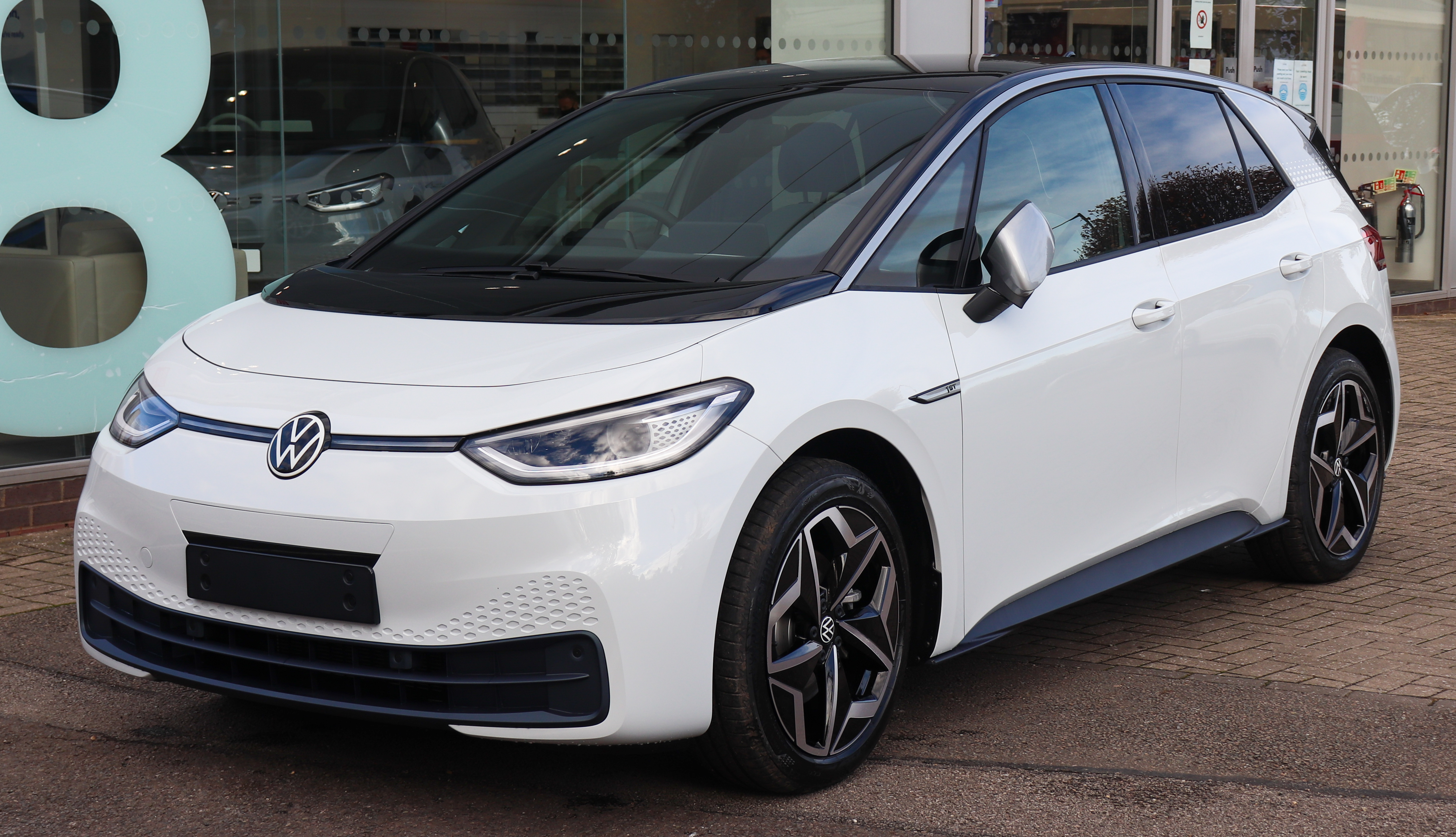
The Volkswagen ID.3

In 2017, Volkswagen announced plans to place a considerable focus on electric vehicles (EV), with a goal to launch at least 30 EV models by 2025, and have 20 to 25 per cent of its total yearly sales volume (2–3 million) consist of EVs. In September 2017, Volkswagen CEO Matthias Müller stated that the company aimed to have electric versions of all of its vehicle models by 2030, at a cost of €20 billion, and €50 billion on acquisition of batteries. On 6 March 2017 at the Geneva Motor Show, Volkswagen presented its prototype for the Sedric, a fully autonomous car.

In 2018, Volkswagen returned to motorsport by unveiling its all-electric I.D. R. At the Pikes Peak International Hill Climb, Romain Dumas set an all-time course record of just under eight minutes driving the I.D. R.

In September 2018, Volkswagen announced that it would discontinue production of the Beetle (A5) in 2019. Also in September 2018, Volkswagen announced its $100 million investment in Silicon Valley–based solid-state battery startup QuantumScape, becoming the startup's largest automotive investor and gaining representation on its board.

In February 2019, Volkswagen announced that it would launch an entry-level Jetta sub-brand in China aimed at young buyers. Three models – a sedan and two SUVs – were announced in July 2019, all three of which would be manufactured in China as a part of Volkswagen's joint venture with FAW. In September 2019 at the Frankfurt Motor Show, Volkswagen officially unveiled a refreshed logo (a thinner, two-dimensional version of the previous logo) and new sonic branding to accompany the newly launched ID.3 electric vehicle. Volkswagen stated that the ID.3 signified the start of a "new era" of the company. In September 2019, Volkswagen also announced a program to allow old Beetle models to be converted to run on electric power. The electric motor and battery updates would be done in partnership with German company eClassics. The electric components used for retrofitting would be based upon those found in the e-up! model.

In November 2020, Volkswagen announced that, in an attempt to remain the world's largest carmaker in the green era, it would increase its investment in electric and self-driving cars to $86 billion over the next five years. In January 2021, Volkswagen announced that its sales in 2020 dropped by 9.9% in China, 23.4% in western Europe and 17.1% in North America. In March 2021, Volkswagen announced that it would stop developing new internal combustion engines, although it would keep tweaking existing engines to comply with stricter emission rules. Also, the company announced it was changing the American division's name to "Voltswagen", with the help of Johannes Leonardo, before revealing the move to be a hoax. In a tweet, the company said, the stunt "got the whole world buzzing." However, some news sources misconstrued the announcement to be real, including the Associated Press, whose headline about being fooled read, "Volkswagen caught lying again, this time about changing its name."In March 2022, Volkswagen released the ID. Buzz electric minivan. On 11 May 2022, Volkswagen confirmed the relaunch of its Scout off-road vehicle brand, this time as an EV. Production is set to begin in 2026, and this relaunch will be the first time that VW creates a new brand based solely in the US market. In July 2022, Volkswagen noted the development of the first of its own gigafactories. The site, based in Salzgitter, has been termed Mission SalzGiga. The new business unit is focused on all of Volkswagen's battery activities "from raw materials and the cell right through to recycling", and is part of a €20 billion investment. Another Volkswagen gigafactory project in Sagunto needed government subsidies in order to go ahead. In September 2022, Volkswagen introduced the ID. XTREME1 concept car, an off-road electric SUV. Volkswagen planning a hydrogen car with 1,250s range of mile. VW's CEO has stated that it does not plan to roll out H2 passenger vehicles in the 2020s. The deals showcase in the patent filing was developed as part of a collaboration between Volkswagen and Kraftwerk Tubes.

In December 2023, VW announced that its brands selling in the North American market – Volkswagen, Porsche, Audi, Scout Motors – would adopt the Tesla-initiated NACS charging connector starting in 2025. In June 2024, VW stated that it would continue to heavily develop internal combustion engine vehicles amid dwindling sales of its EV product line. In October 2024, Scout Motors announced it would sell directly to customers and service vehicles itself, following the model adopted by Tesla and other EV competitors, rather than use the Volkswagen dealer network. In December 2024, Workers at Volkswagen factories in Germany announced they were going to strike over plans to close at least three plants, lay off thousands of workers, and cut pay by 10%.

In August 2025, Volkswagen introduced a subscription service for its customers, charging £16.50 monthly, £165 annually, or £649 for lifetime access to unlock the vehicles' full 228 bhp output, which the hardware supports from the factory but is software-limited to 201 bhp by default. In November 2025, Chinese electric car company XPeng announced Volkswagen as the first client for its new driver-assist system, designed for navigating narrow streets. In December 2025, Audi announced that it would be investing $186 billion as part of a five-year investment plan from 2026 to 2030.

It was decided on 9 July 2026 that half of the models were to be shut down.

In August 2026, CEO Oliver Blume proposed increasing planned job cuts to as many as 100,000 as part of a cost-cutting and restructuring program.

== Operations ==
Volkswagen is the founding and namesake member of the Volkswagen Group, a large international corporation in charge of multiple car and truck brands, including Audi, SEAT, Porsche, Lamborghini, Bentley, Bugatti, Scania, MAN, and Škoda. Volkswagen Group's global headquarters are located in the historic town of Wolfsburg, Germany.

Volkswagen Group, as a unit, is the largest motor vehicle manufacturer in Europe, with over 74,000 employees and more than 7,700 dealerships. For a long time, Volkswagen has had a market share over 20 per cent.

In 2010, Volkswagen posted record sales of 6.29 million vehicles, with its global market share at 11.4%. In 2008, Volkswagen became the third-largest car maker in the world, and, as of 2016, Volkswagen was the second largest manufacturer worldwide. In 2018, the company benefited from trade tariffs and new emission standards, with a record deliveries of 10.8 million vehicles. Volkswagen Group's core markets include Germany and China.

In July 2019, Volkswagen invested $2.6 billion in Argo AI, a startup focused on developing self-driving vehicles backed by Ford since 2017. After failing to secure further investment from Amazon in October 2022, Ford announced that Argo would be disbanded and some employees would be split between Ford and VW. Argo's technology would be salvaged and further developed in-house by both Ford and VW.

=== International properties ===
Volkswagen logo evolution (1937–2019)

Volkswagen has factories in many parts of the world, manufacturing or assembling vehicles for local markets. In addition to plants in Germany, Volkswagen has manufacturing or assembly facilities in Mexico, the United States, Slovakia, China, India, Russia (sold to the Russian company Avilon in 2023), Malaysia, Brazil, Argentina, Portugal, Spain, Poland, the Czech Republic, Bosnia and Herzegovina, Kenya and South Africa. In 2011, Volkswagen was named one of the top 25 largest companies in the world by the Forbes Global 2000.

As of May 2014, Volkswagen was planning to start assembling certain engines in India to increase localisation from 70% to 90%.

In January 2016, Volkswagen announced the launch of a new factory in Algeria during a summit between Angela Merkel and Algerian prime minister Abdelmalek Sellal. The factory was launched in Relizane, producing Volkswagen Golf Mk7, Volkswagen Polo, Volkswagen Caddy, SEAT Ibiza and Škoda Octavia cars.

In the 2024 review of WIPO's annual World Intellectual Property Indicators, VW ranked sixth in the world for its 312 industrial design registrations that were published under the Hague System during 2023.

Since 1985, Volkswagen has also run the AutoMuseum Volkswagen in Wolfsburg, which is dedicated to the history of the company.

=== Working conditions ===
In December 2011, Volkswagen agreed to implement a rule passed by the company's Works Council aimed at improving work–life balance and avoiding burnout by restricting company email functionality on the firm's BlackBerry smartphones to working periods and the half-hour before and after working periods. About 1,150 of Volkswagen's more than 190,000 employees in Germany were affected by the email restriction.

Because of Volkswagen's use of IPPD, a human contact allergen, in various polymers of its vehicles, it has coined the term Volkswagen dermatitis.

=== Relationship with Porsche and the Volkswagen Law ===
Volkswagen has always had a close relationship with Porsche, the Zuffenhausen-based sports car manufacturer founded in 1931 by Ferdinand Porsche, the original Volkswagen designer and co-founder, hired by Adolf Hitler for the project. The first Porsche car, the 1938 Porsche 64, used many components from the Volkswagen Beetle. The 1948 Porsche 356 continued using many Volkswagen components, including a tuned engine, gearbox and suspension.

The two companies continued their collaboration in 1969 to make the VW-Porsche 914 and Porsche 914-6 (the 914-6 had a six-cylinder Porsche engine, and the standard 914 had a Volkswagen engine). Volkswagen and Porsche would collaborate again in 1976 on the Porsche 912-E (US only) and the Porsche 924, which used many Audi components and was built at Audi's Neckarsulm facilities. The 924 was originally designated for AUDI. Most Porsche 944 models were built there, although they used far fewer VW components.

The Porsche Cayenne, introduced in 2002, shares its entire chassis with the Volkswagen Touareg and Audi Q7, and is built at the same Volkswagen factory in Bratislava that the other SUVs are built.

In September 2005, Porsche announced it would increase its 5% stake in Volkswagen to 20% at a cost of €3 billion, with the intention that the combined stakes of Porsche and the government of Lower Saxony would ensure that any hostile takeover by foreign investors would be impossible. Speculated suitors included DaimlerChrysler, BMW, and Renault. In July 2006, Porsche increased its ownership again to 25.1%.

On 4 March 2005, the European Commission brought an action against the Federal Republic of Germany before the European Court of Justice, claiming that the Volkswagen Law, which prevents any shareholder in Volkswagen from executing more than 20% of the total voting rights in the firm, was illegally restricting the flow of capital in Europe. On 13 February 2007, Advocate General Dámaso Ruiz-Jarabo Colomer submitted an opinion to the court in support of the action. This again opened the possibility of a hostile takeover of VW. On 26 March 2007, Porsche took its holding of Volkswagen shares to 30.9%. Porsche formally announced in a press statement that it did not intend to take over Volkswagen, but intended the move to avoid a competitor's taking a large stake and to stop hedge funds from dismantling VW.

As expected, on 22 October 2007, the European Court of Justice ruled in agreement with Ruiz-Jarabo, and the law was struck down. In October 2007, the European Court of Justice ruled that the VW law was illegal because it was protectionist. At that time, Porsche held 31% of VW shares – a smaller proportion of voting rights due to the Volkswagen Law – and there had been speculation that Porsche would be interested in taking over VW if the law did not stand in its way. The court also prevented the government from appointing Volkswagen board members. The German government then rewrote the Volkswagen law, only to be sued again. In October 2013, the EU Court of Justice in Luxembourg ruled that the rewritten Volkswagen law "complied in full" with EU rules.

On 26 October 2008, Porsche revealed its plan to assume control of VW. As of that day, it held 42.6% of Volkswagen's ordinary shares and stock options on another 31.5%. Combined with the state of Lower Saxony's 20.1% stake, this left only 5.8% of shares on the market – mostly with index funds that could not legally sell. Hedge funds desperate to cover their short positions forced Volkswagen stock above €1,000 per share, briefly making it the world's largest company by market capitalisation on 28 October 2008. By January 2009, Porsche had a 50.76% holding in Volkswagen AG, although the Volkswagen Law prevented it from taking control of the company.

On 6 May 2009, the two companies decided to join in a merger. On 13 August, Volkswagen Aktiengesellschaft's supervisory board signed the agreement to create an integrated automotive group with Porsche led by Volkswagen. The initial decision was for Volkswagen to take a 42.0% stake in Porsche AG by the end of 2009, and it would also see the family shareholders selling the automobile trading business of Porsche Holding Salzburg to Volkswagen. In October 2009, however, Volkswagen announced that its percentage in Porsche would be 49.9% for a cost of €3.9 billion (the 42.0% deal would have cost €3.3 billion). On 1 March 2011, Volkswagen finalised the purchase of Porsche Holding Salzburg (PHS), Austria's leading specialty automobile distributor, for €3.3 billion ($4.55 billion).

In January 2020, Volkswagen was overtaken by Tesla as the second most valuable automaker.

=== Exit from Russian market ===
After 24 February 2022, as a result of Russia's full-scale invasion of Ukraine and in line with sanctions against Russia, Volkswagen, after BMW and Mercedes, ceased production at its subsidiaries in Russia – the plants in Kaluga and Nizhny Novgorod. It also terminated all dealership agreements with Russian partners, sold all its shares, and stopped exporting models of its subsidiaries Škoda, Audi, Porsche, and Bentley to Russia.

In March 2023, a Russian court froze all Volkswagen's assets in Russia at the suit of the local automaker GAZ. The following May, Volkswagen made an agreement worth up to €125 million with Art-Finance LLC, the financial partner of the local Avilon dealer, which provided for the transfer of all local VW subsidiaries to the new investor.

== Product line ==
Best-selling Volkswagen models in 2022
Rank	Model	Production output
1	Tiguan	604,536
2	Polo/Virtus/Taigo/Nivus	448,043
3	Passat/Magotan	447,246
4	Lavida	377,284
5	T-Roc	322,211
6	T-Cross/Tacqua/Taigun	315,036
7	Golf	300,090
8	Jetta/Sagitar	292,038
9	Atlas/Teramont	217,771
10	Tharu/Taos	216,397

The Volkswagen brand produces various models which consists of global products and regional products, specifically for large markets including Europe, China and Latin America. The Volkswagen AG annual report in 2022 reported that the best-selling model under the Volkswagen brand globally was the Tiguan, followed by the B-segment range of Polo, Virtus, Nivus and Taigo, and Passat/Magotan.

=== Hatchbacks ===
Volkswagen has been one of the leading manufacturer in terms of hatchback production, which traditionally has been a popular segment in Europe. The brand offered a range of hatchbacks from A-segment, B-segment, and C-segment. The Golf has traditionally been the strongest selling vehicle for the brand in Europe, followed by the smaller Polo, which, apart from the European market, also has a stronghold in emerging markets. Sales for the hatchback category has slowed down due to the rise of the SUV segment.

=== SUVs/crossovers ===
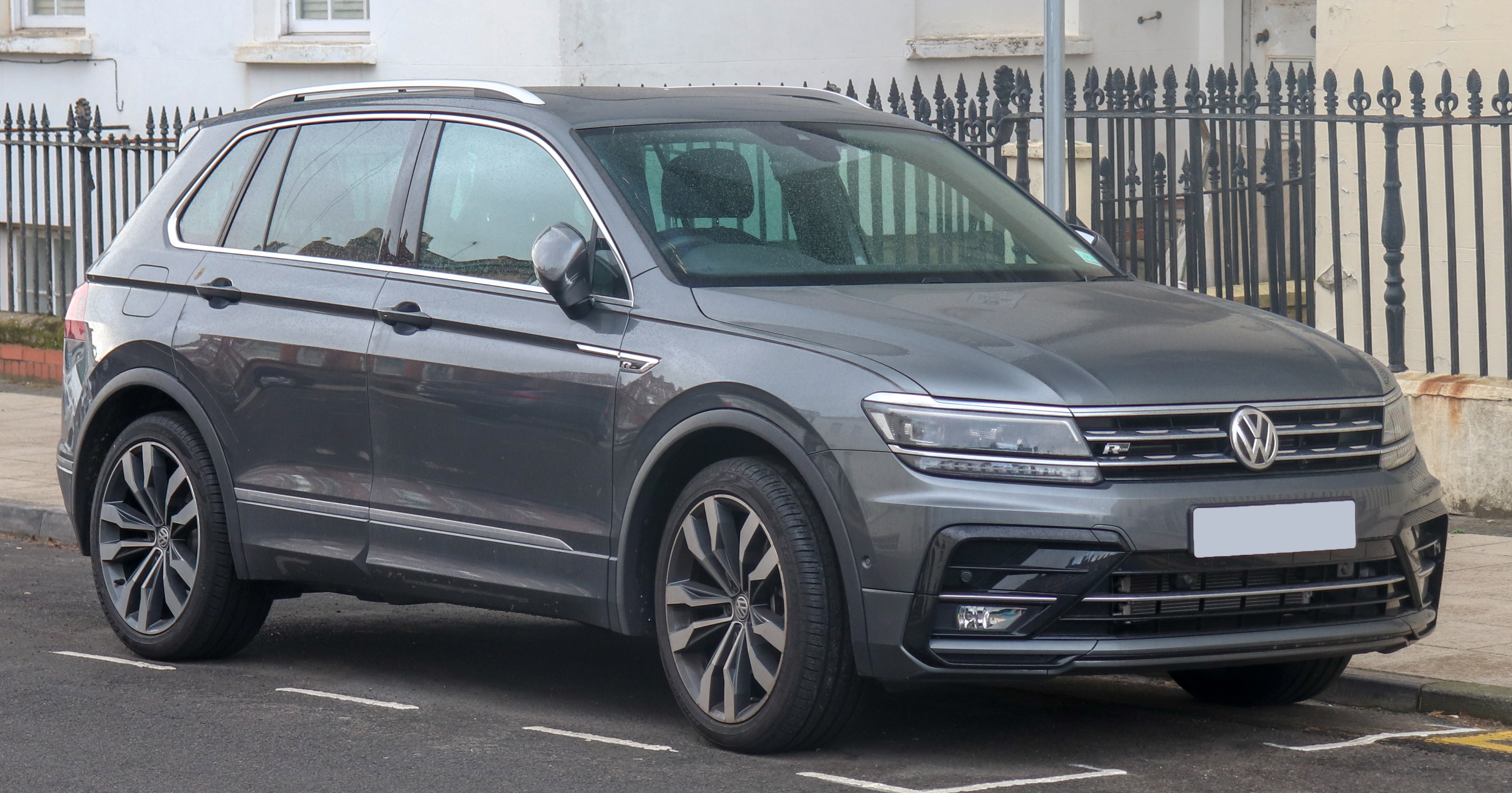
The Volkswagen Tiguan has claimed the top spot in terms of sales figures within Volkswagen models.

In 2002, Volkswagen introduced its first crossover SUV, the Touareg, a full-size luxury SUV. The brand's SUV expansion continued in 2007 with the release of Tiguan, a C-segment mainstream SUV. In the mid-2010s, the company decided to produce an SUV in every class of car that can justify one, which the brand called the "SUV offensive". Between 2017 and 2020, the brand aggressively expanded its SUV line-up by growing its number of models from two to eight, excluding its derivatives, ranging from B-segment, C-segment, and D-segment SUVs which include global models and regional models. Volkswagen also started producing derivatives of its SUV models with a rear sloping roof marketed as coupé SUV which had gained popularity in China, the largest single market for the brand.

In 2019, every fourth vehicle delivered by Volkswagen was an SUV, with its top contributor being the Tiguan. The company aimed to have over 30 SUV models on offer worldwide by 2025, contributing 50 per cent of its global sales. Volkswagen also expected SUVs to lead the ID. family, its future electric vehicle range of models.

The SUV expansion has claimed casualties in the MPV segment, which saw the Sharan mid-size MPV being phased out in 2020.

=== Regional models ===
==== Chinese market ====
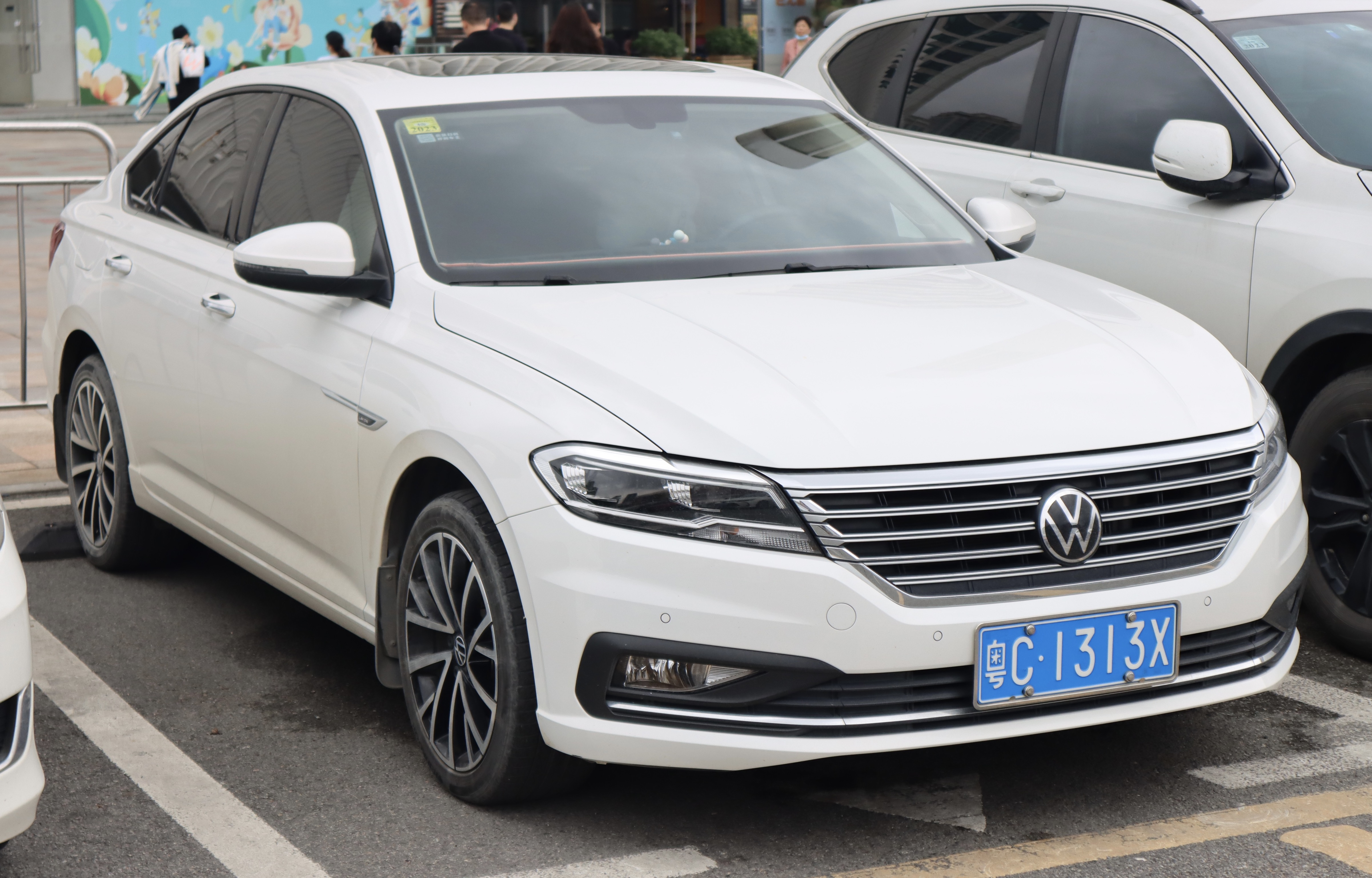
The Volkswagen Lavida was the best-selling sedan in China.

Until 2022, Volkswagen was a market leader in China, the largest single automotive market in the world. In 2019, 3.16 million Volkswagen-branded vehicles were delivered in the country. The importance of the market has justified a significant amount of China-specific models. Though Volkswagen was long a leader in the Chinese market, its market share declined in the 2020s due to the rapid adoption of electric vehicles and increasing competition from Chinese brands. Its market share in the region fell from 19% in 2019 to 14.5% in 2024.

Sedans are a favoured segment in China due to their spacious interiors and boot space. In 2019, Volkswagen sold 1.6 million of them in China. In the compact notchback or sedan segment, VW is represented by several China-only models which include the Sagitar, Lamando, Bora, Santana, Lavida, and its derivatives in other body styles, while the mid-size sedan segment is represented by the Passat and Magotan. In 2019, the Lavida was the best-selling model in China, with 491,000 units sold.

The popularity of SUVs also gave birth to several SUV models built or reworked specifically for China, including the Tharu, Tayron, Tayron X, Tiguan X, and reworked versions of the T-Cross and T-Roc. VW also has a strong presence in the premium or luxury segment, including the Phideon and Viloran as the models developed specifically for China.

On 26 July 2023, Volkswagen announced its investment of $700 million in Chinese electric vehicle manufacturer XPeng for purchasing 4.99% stake of the company. VW also announced it would collaborate with XPeng to develop two VW brand electric models for the mid-size segment in the Chinese market in 2026.

==== Brazilian market ====
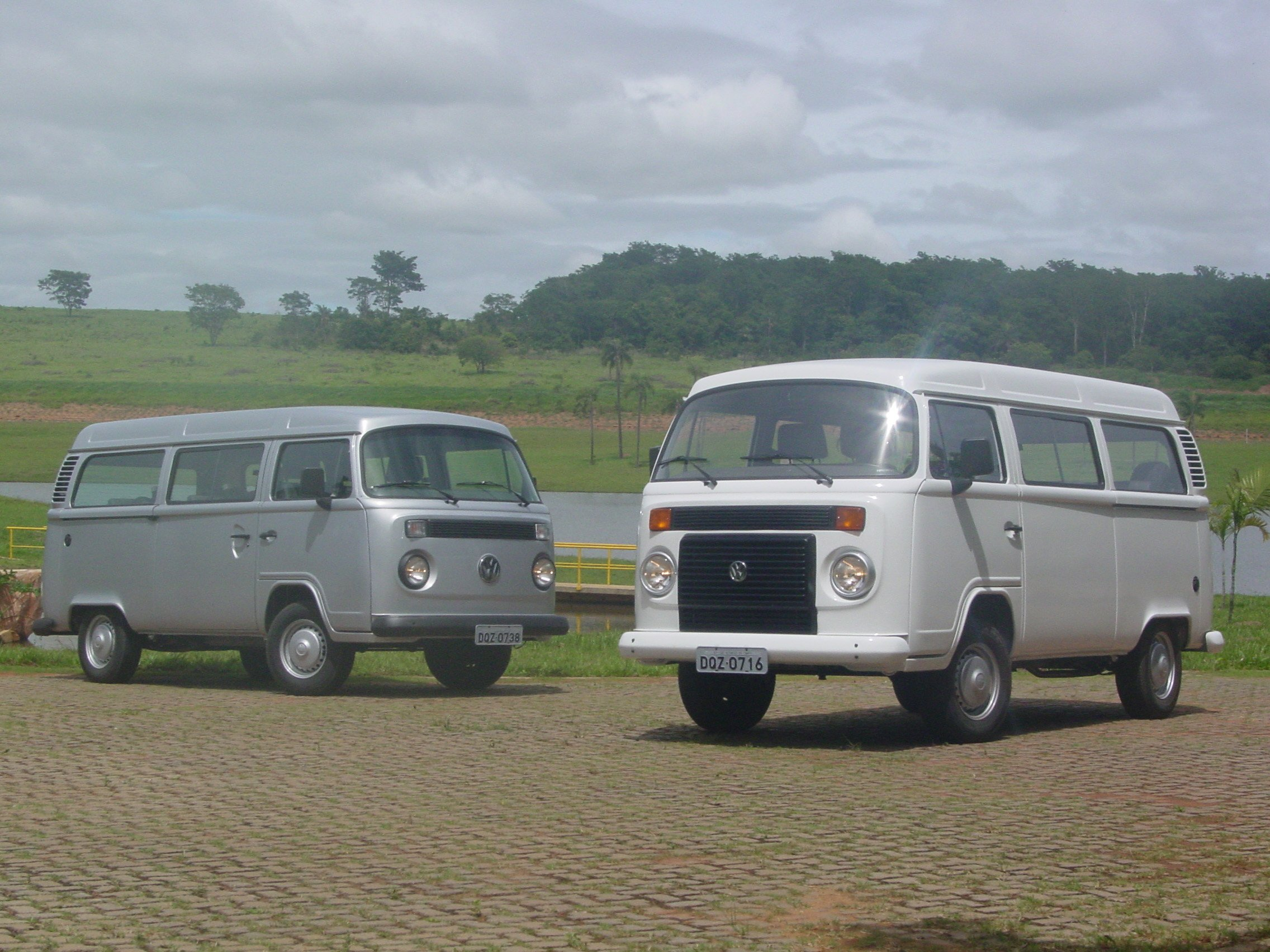
The Volkswagen Kombi was produced in Brazil from 1957 to 2013.

Volkswagen has a notable history in Brazil that dates back to the early 1950s. In 1956, Volkswagen began by building a plant in São Bernardo do Campo near São Paulo as its first manufacturing plant outside Germany as a response to Brazil's ban on the import of completely assembled vehicles in 1950. A year later, the plant started to produce the Kombi model – 370 cars at that time, with a 50 per cent local content component share. Of the 81 million vehicles produced over six decades in Brazil, 23 million were built by Volkswagen, who had four passenger car factories in the country. In 2018, Volkswagen accounted for close to 15 per cent of the Brazilian car market.

The importance of the Brazilian market gave birth to several models developed and manufactured by Volkswagen do Brasil, which include the Volkswagen Fox, Gol, Nivus, Saveiro, Virtus and Voyage. These models are also typically exported throughout Latin America. Historical vehicles built for the market include the Brasília, SP1 & SP2, 1500/Variant/Variant II, Karmann Ghia TC, Parati and Suran. The Gol, first launched in 1980, was the best-selling car in Brazil for 27 consecutive years, up until 2013.

=== Environment-friendly vehicles ===
==== Pure ethanol vehicles ====
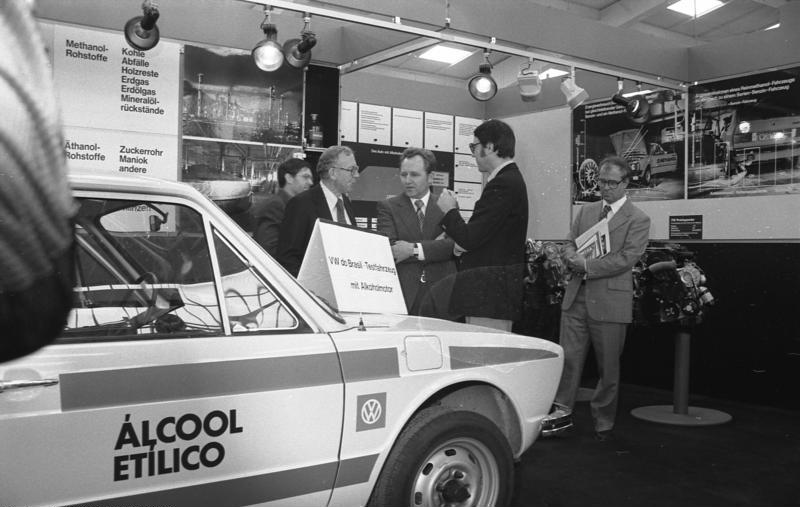
VW pure ethanol prototype car, developed by Volkswagen do Brasil in 1978

Volkswagen do Brasil produced and sold pure ethanol-powered (E100 only) vehicles in Brazil, whose production was discontinued only after they were supplanted by more modern Flex Fuel technology. In response to the 1973 oil crisis, the Brazilian government began promoting bioethanol as a fuel, and the National Alcohol Program, Pró-Álcool (Portuguese: Programa Nacional do Álcool), was launched in 1975. Compelled by the 1979 energy crisis, and after development and testing with government fleets by the CTA at São José dos Campos, and further testing of several prototypes developed by the four local car makers (including Volkswagen do Brasil), pure ethanol vehicles were launched in the Brazilian market. Petrol engines were modified to support hydrous ethanol characteristics and changes included compression ratio, amount of fuel injected, replacement of materials that would be corroded by contact with ethanol, use of colder spark plugs suitable for dissipating heat due to higher flame temperatures, and an auxiliary cold-start system that injects petrol from a small tank in the engine compartment to help starting when cold. Within six years, around 75% of all Brazilian passenger cars were manufactured with ethanol engines.

In 1987, production and sales of pure ethanol vehicles began to tumble, owing to several factors, including a sharp decline in petrol prices as a result of the 1980s oil glut, and high sugar prices in the world market, shifting sugarcane ethanol production from fuel to sugar. By mid-1989, a shortage of ethanol fuel supply in the local market left thousands of vehicles in line at petrol stations or out of fuel in their garages, forcing consumers to abandon ethanol vehicles.

==== Flexible-fuel vehicles ====
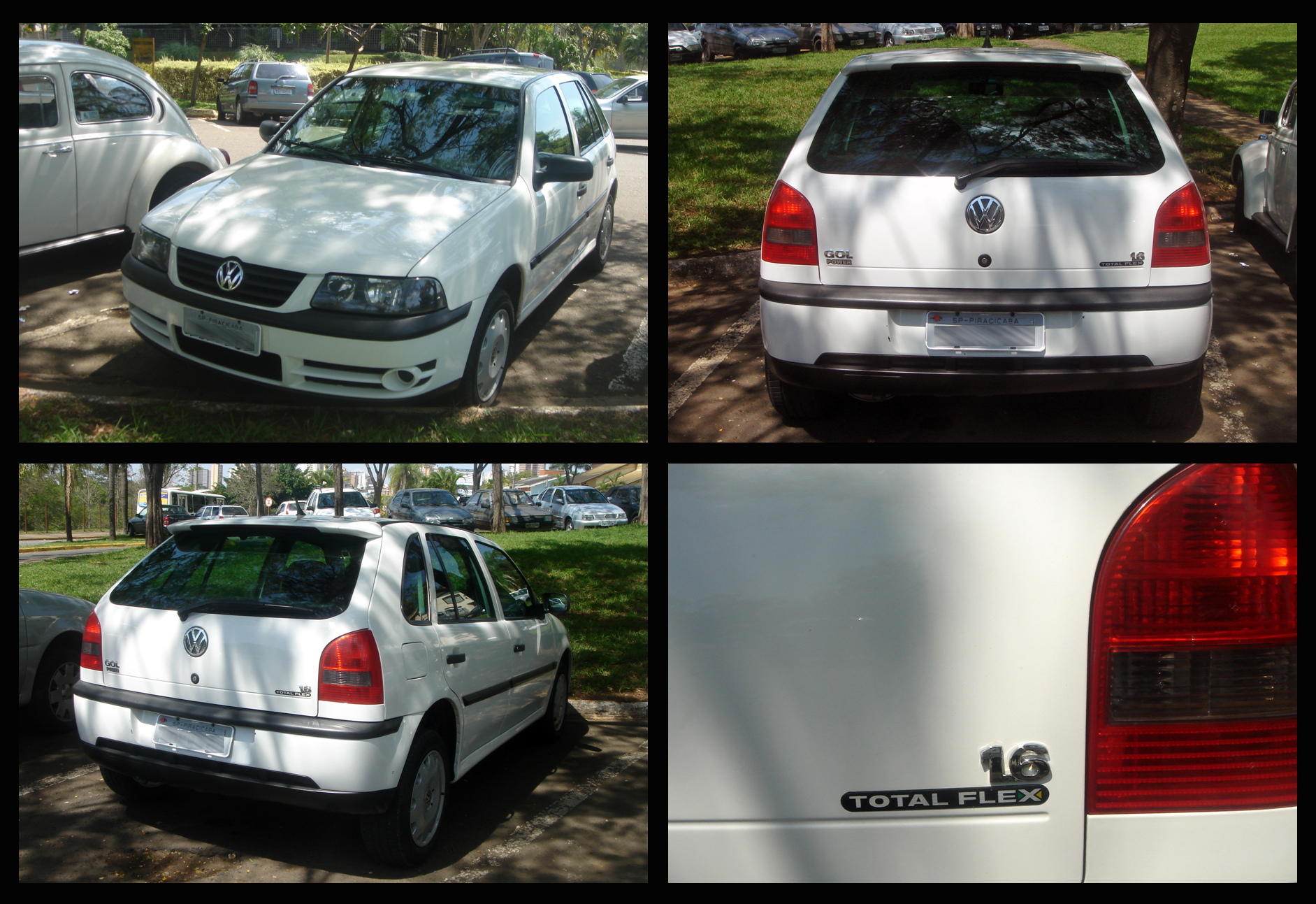
Volkswagen Gol Total Flex

The 2003 VW Gol 1.6 Total Flex was the first full flexible-fuel vehicle launched in Brazil, capable of running on any blend of petrol and E100. In March 2003, for its 50th anniversary, Volkswagen do Brasil launched the Gol 1.6 Total Flex, the first Brazilian commercial flexible fuel vehicle capable of running on any mix of E20-E25 petrol and up to 100% hydrous ethanol fuel (E100). After the pure ethanol fiasco, consumer confidence in ethanol-powered vehicles was restored, allowing the rapid adoption of the flex technology. This was facilitated by the fuel distribution infrastructure already in place throughout Brazil, with more than 30,000 fueling stations that had spawned from the Pró-Álcool program.

By 2005, owing to the success and rapid consumer acceptance of the flex-fuel versions, Volkswagen had sold 293,523 flex-fuel cars and light-duty trucks, and only 53,074 petrol-only automobiles, jumping to 525,838 flex-fuel vehicles and only 13,572 petrol-only cars and 248 petrol-only light trucks in 2007, and reaching new car sales of 564,959 flex-fuel vehicles in 2008, representing 96% of all new cars and light-duty trucks sold that year. VW do Brasil stopped manufacturing petrol-only vehicles for Brazil in 2006; all of the remaining petrol-only Volkswagen models sold in Brazil are imported. The flex-fuel models currently produced for the Brazilian market are the Gol, Fox, CrossFox, Parati, Polo Hatch, Polo Sedan, Saveiro, Golf, and Kombi. By March 2009, Volkswagen do Brasil had produced two million flex-fuel vehicles since 2003.

==== Hybrid vehicles ====
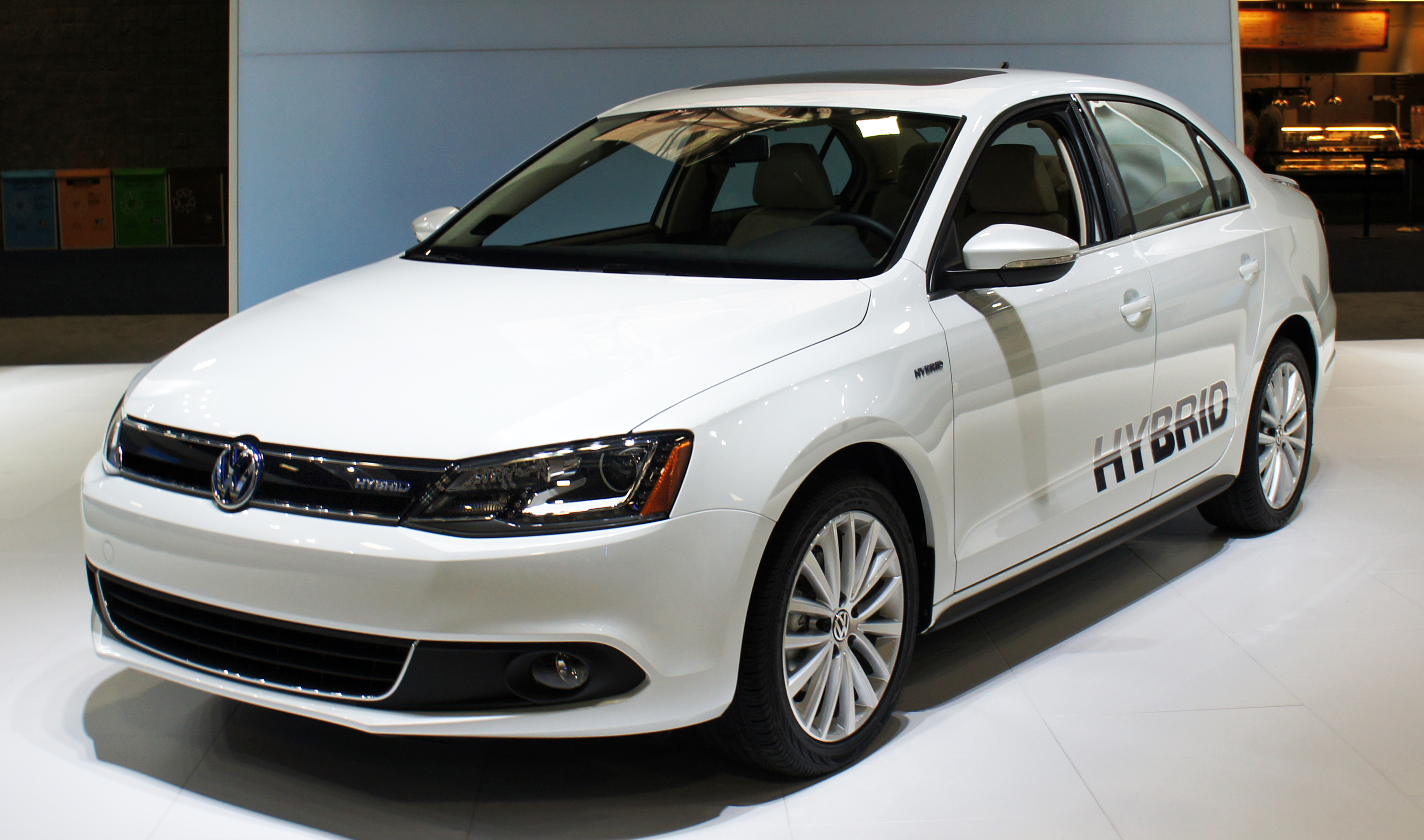
The Volkswagen Jetta Hybrid achieves 4.9 L/100 km (48 mpg_{‑US}) on highway

In 2010, Volkswagen and Sanyo teamed up to develop a battery system for hybrid cars. Volkswagen head Martin Winterkorn said of the company's plans to compact hybrid electric vehicles, "There will definitely be compact hybrid models, such as Polo and Golf, and without any great delay," with petrol and diesel power. For example, the Golf is the ideal model to go hybrid, as the Golf 1.4 TSI was awarded the "Auto Environment Certificate" by the Oko-Trend Institute for Environmental Research, and was considered one of the most environmentally friendly vehicles of 2007. Also being developed at Volkswagen's Braunschweig R&D facilities in Northern Germany was a hybrid version of the next-generation Touareg. VW intends all future models to have the hybrid option.

In an interview with Automobilwoche magazine, VW head of development Ulrich Hackenberg said that "Future VW models will fundamentally also be constructed with hybrid concepts." Hackenberg also said that the car based on the Up! concept seen at Frankfurt Motor Show, as well as all future models, could be offered with either full or partial hybrid options. The rear-engine Up! went into production in 2011. Nothing has been said about plug-in hybrid options.

At the 2010 Geneva Motor Show, Volkswagen announced the launch of the 2012 Touareg Hybrid, scheduled for 2011. VW also announced plans to introduce diesel-electric hybrid versions of its most popular models in 2012, beginning with the new Jetta, followed by the Golf Hybrid in 2013, together with hybrid versions of the Passat. In 2012, the Volkswagen Jetta Hybrid set the world record to become the fastest hybrid car at 301 km/h (187 mph).

==== Plug-in electric vehicles ====
In November 2009, Volkswagen announced it had hired Karl-Thomas Neumann as its group chief officer for electric traction. VW's chief of research, Jürgen Leohold, said in 2010 that the company concluded that hydrogen fuel-cell cars are not a viable option.

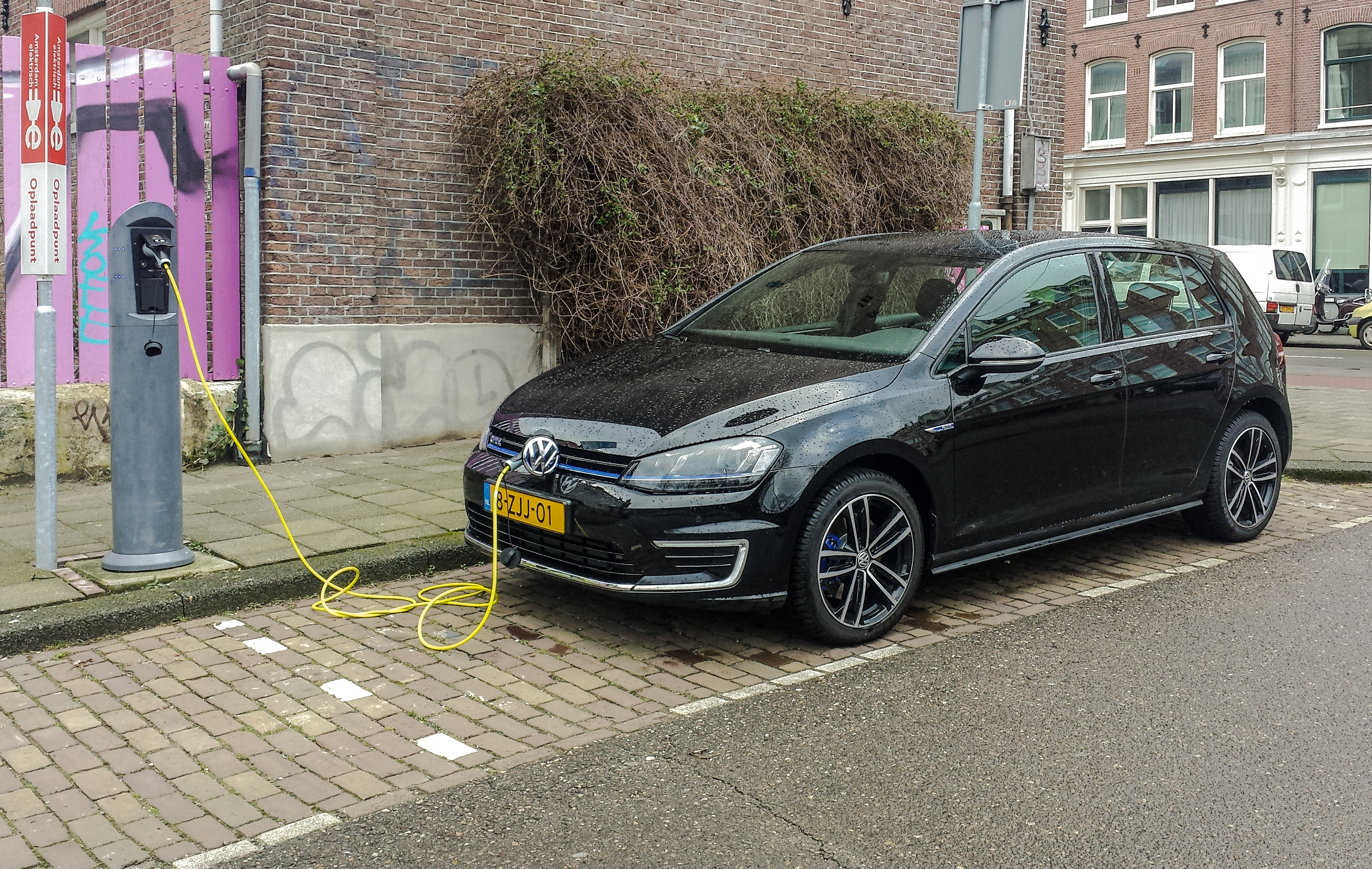
Volkswagen Golf GTE plug-in hybrid charging

As of May 2016, the Volkswagen Group offers retail customers nine plug-in electric cars: three of which are all-electric cars (the Volkswagen e-Up!, e-Golf, and Audi R8 e-tron) and six are plug-in hybrids (the Volkswagen Golf GTE, Passat GTE, Audi A3 Sportback e-tron, Q7 e-tron quattro, Porsche Panamera S E-Hybrid and Cayenne S E-Hybrid). Also, two limited-production plug-in hybrids were manufactured beginning in 2013: the Volkswagen XL1 (250 units) and the Porsche 918 Spyder (918 units). Total cumulative sales of all Volkswagen brand electrified cars since the start of their respective production was expected to reach about 103,000 by the end of 2016. The Volkswagen ID.4 was launched in the US in September 2020.

In order to comply with increasingly strict carbon dioxide emission limits in major markets, the VW Group expects to sell about one million all-electric and plug-in hybrid vehicles a year worldwide by 2025. It also plans to expand its plug-in range with 20 new pure electric and plug-in hybrid cars, including two cars to compete with Tesla: the Porsche Mission E all-electric car and the Audi e-tron quattro, which is expected to become the brand's first mass-production electric vehicle. According to VW brand production chief Thomas Ulbrich, the company has the capacity to build as many as 75,000 battery-electric and plug-in hybrids a year if demand rises. Volkswagen announced in October 2015 that it would "develop a modular architecture for battery-electric cars, called the MEB. The standardised system will be designed for all body structures and vehicle types and will allow the company to build emotionally appealing EVs with a range of up to 500 km (310 mi)." In June 2016, VW launched a program to develop 30 all-electric cars in 10 years and sell 2–3 million electric cars per year by 2025. Due to lower person-power requirements for electric motors than for piston engines, VW expects a gradual workforce reduction as the number of electric cars increase. VW considers battery factory ownership as too expensive.

=== Flying vehicles ===
In February 2021, Volkswagen issued a statement that "vertical mobility" could be the next step after self-driving technology. It announced that the company is exploring the feasibility of flying vehicles in China.

== Awards ==
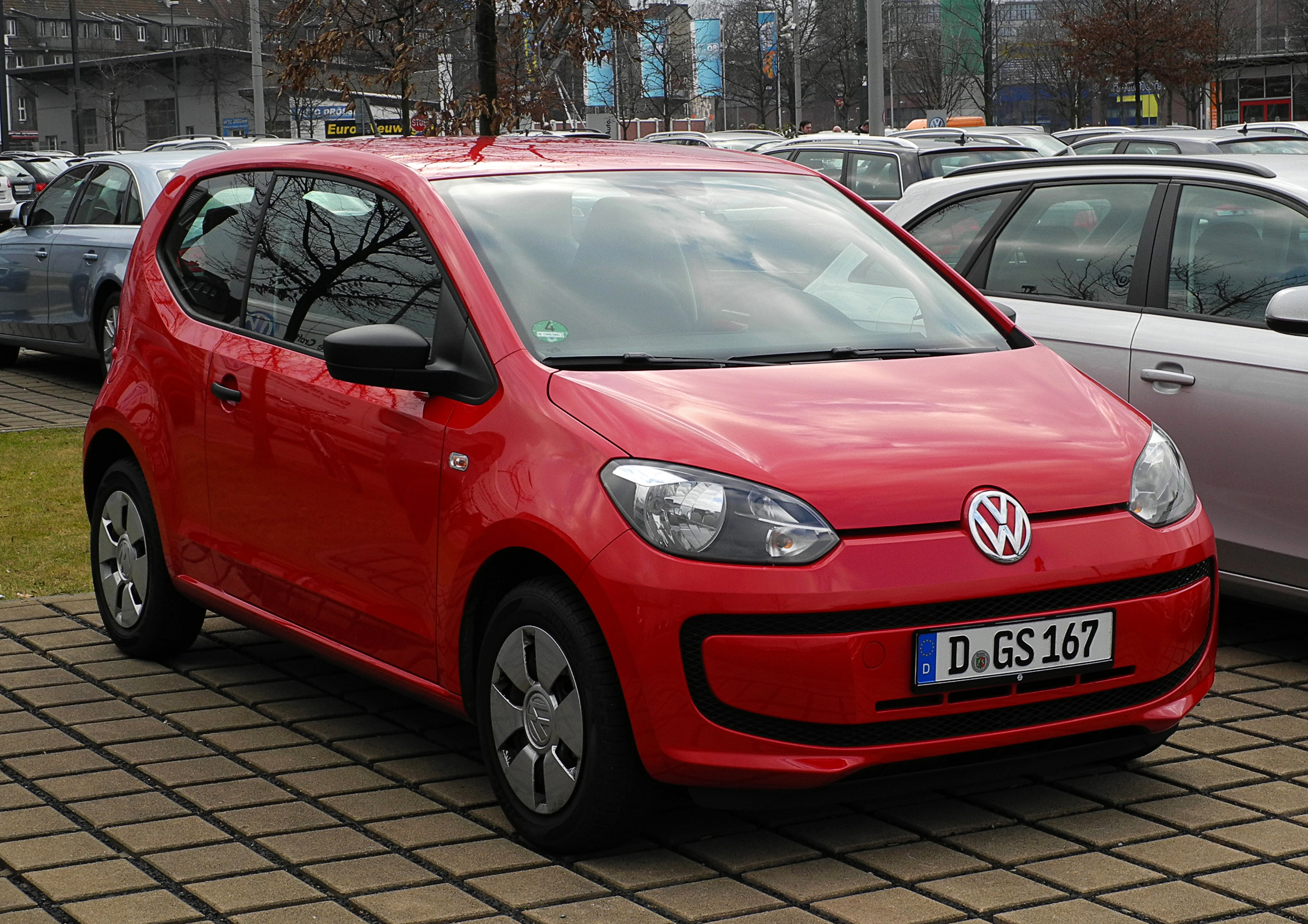
The Volkswagen up! won the 2012 World Car of the Year.

Volkswagen was named the fourth most influential car of the 20th century in the 1999 Car of the Century competition, for its Volkswagen Type 1 "Beetle" model. It trailed only the Ford Model T, BMC Mini, and Citroën DS.

Volkswagen has produced four winners of the 60-year-old European Car of the Year award.

- 1992: Volkswagen Golf
- 2010: Volkswagen Polo
- 2013: Volkswagen Golf
- 2015: Volkswagen Passat

Volkswagen has produced five winners of the United States Motor Trend Car of the Year award – the original Car of the Year designation, which began in 1949.

- 1985: Volkswagen GTI
- 1999: Volkswagen New Beetle (Import COTY subgroup)
- 2004: Volkswagen Touareg (Sport Utility Vehicle COTY subgroup)
- 2012: Volkswagen Passat
- 2015: Volkswagen Golf line-up

Volkswagen has already produced five winners of the recently developed World Car of the Year award.

- 2009: Volkswagen Golf
- 2010: Volkswagen Polo
- 2012: Volkswagen up!
- 2013: Volkswagen Golf
- 2021: Volkswagen ID.4

== Motorsport ==
=== Formula racing ===
- In 1963, Formula Vee circuit racing, with cars built from easily available Beetle parts, started in the United States. It quickly spread to Europe and other parts of the world. It proved very popular as a low-cost route into formula racing.
- In 1971, Volkswagen of America started the more powerful Formula Super Vee, which became famous for housing new talent. In the 11 years it ran, until 1982, it produced a stable of world-famous Formula One drivers – names like Niki Lauda, Jochen Mass, Nelson Piquet, Jochen Rindt and Keke Rosberg. Volkswagen also notched up several victories, and the championship in Formula Three.
- In July 2011 Wolfgang Dürheimer told German magazine Auto, Motor und Sport that "if [the VW group] is at the forefront of the auto industry, I can imagine us competing in Formula 1 in 2018. We have enough brands to pull it off." They did not compete in F1 in 2018.
- In August 2022, Volkswagen Audi Group confirmed entry into Formula 1 due to start in the 2026 season. Initially partnered with Sauber F1 team, but have now decided to take full control of the Sauber team that will use the Audi name.

=== World Rally Championship ===
- In 1981, now based in Hanover, VW took a new direction into rallying with the launch of the first-generation Golf, Sweden's Per Eklund, Frenchman Jean-Luc Thérier, and the Finn Pentti Airikkala. The final chapters in Volkswagen Racing UK's rallying story were the 'one-make' Castrol Polo Challenge, and the Polo GTI 'Super 1600' in 2001.
- Volkswagen Motorsport won the World Rally Championship with Sébastien Ogier and co-driver Julien Ingrassia four consecutive tears (2013 to 2016) in the Volkswagen Polo R WRC.

=== Dakar Rally ===
- In 1980, Volkswagen competed with the Audi-developed Iltis, placing 1st, 2nd, 4th and 9th overall.
- In 2003, the Hanover-based team entered with a 2WD buggy named Tarek, finishing 6th overall and 1st in the 2WD and Diesel class.
- In 2005, an updated Race-Touareg with slightly more power entered, with driver Bruno Saby finishing 3rd overall and 1st in the Diesel class.
- In 2006, the revised Race-Touareg entered, with driver Giniel de Villiers finishing 2nd overall and 1st in the Diesel class.
- Volkswagen won the 2009, 2010 and 2011 Dakar Rally, held in South America.

=== Volkswagen motorsport worldwide ===
- Europe: In 1998, the company founded the ADAC Volkswagen Lupo Cup (renamed Polo Cup in 2003 and Volkswagen Scirocco R-Cup from 2010 to 2014), and started the ADAC New Beetle Cup in 2000. In 2004, Volkswagen Commercial Vehicles entered the European Truck Racing series with the Volkswagen Titan truck – it became a back-to-back champion for the 2004 and 2005 series.
- United States: In 1976, Volkswagen entered the under-2000-cc Trans-Am Series with the Scirocco, and it won its class outright. Beginning in 2008, Volkswagen introduced the Jetta TDI Cup. The Jetta TDI Cup is an SCCA-sanctioned race series that features 25 drivers between the ages of 16 and 26 driving slightly modified 2009 Jetta TDIs. The series features 10 events at 8 different road courses across North America. There is $50,000 prize money at stake over the course of the series in addition to the $100,000 prize awarded to the champion of the series at the conclusion of the last race.
- Argentina: Many Volkswagen models have competed in TC 2000, including the 1980 to 1983 champion Volkswagen 1500 and the 1994 champion Volkswagen Gol.
- In 1999 and 2000, VW won the F2 Australian Rally Championship with the Golf GTI.
- Finland: In 2002, VW won the Finnish Rally Championship in a7/(F2) with a Golf Mk4 KitCar, with Mikko Hirvonen. In 1999 and 2000, VW won the Finnish Rally Championship in a7/(F2) with a Golf Mk3 KitCar. In 2000, 2001 and 2002, VW won the Finnish Racing Championship in Sport 2000 with a Golf Mk4.
- Austria: From 1967 until 1974, the Austrian sole distributor Porsche Salzburg entered the VW Beetle (1500, 1302S and 1303S) in Europe-wide rallies. Victories were achieved in 1972 and 1973 in the overall Austrian championship, on Elba, in the Acropolis rally (first in class). Top drivers were Tony Fall (GB), Achim Warmbold (D), Günter Janger (A), Harry Källström (S).

== Literature ==
- Jonas Kiefer: VW Typenatlas, Serienfahrzeuge. 2. Auflage. Delius Klasing, Bielefeld 2002, ISBN 3-7688-1271-5.
- Rudi Heppe: VW Personenwagen. Podszun, Brilon 2001, ISBN 3-86133-209-4.
- Halwart Schrader: VW Personenwagen seit 1945, Band 1, Typenkompass. Motorbuch Verlag, Stuttgart 2001, ISBN 3-613-02105-6.
- Halwart Schrader: VW Personenwagen seit 1945, Band 2, Typenkompass. Motorbuch Verlag, Stuttgart 2001, ISBN 3-613-02186-2.
- Werner Oswald: Deutsche Autos, Band 2, 1920–1945. 2. Auflage. Motorbuch Verlag, Stuttgart 2005, ISBN 3-613-02170-6.
- Werner Oswald: Deutsche Autos, Band 3, 1945–1990, Ford, Opel und Volkswagen. 1. Auflage. Motorbuch Verlag, Stuttgart 2001, ISBN 3-613-02116-1.

== Football ==
Volkswagen is the owner of the 2. Bundesliga club Vfl Wolfsburg.

== See also ==
- Baja bug
- Cal Look
- List of German cars
- List of automobile manufacturers
- Punch buggy
- Standard Superior, a previous attempt to produce a "Volkswagen"
- Steyr 50
- VDub, tagline for the recent VWoA Golf GTI TV advertisement
- Volksflugzeug
- Volksrod
- Volkswagen advertising
- Volkswagen currywurst, a sausage made by Volkswagen
- VW 276 Schlepperfahrzeug, military use 1944
- Volkswagen controversies

== Sources ==
- Baxter, Ian (2014). Waffen-SS on the Eastern Front 1941-1945: Rare Photographs from Wartime Archives. Pen and Sword Books. ISBN 9781781591864.
- Nelson, Walter (1967). Small Wonder. Boston: Little, Brown & Company. LCCN 67011230. OCLC 1169594. OL 5534622M.
- Odin, L.C. (12 June 2015). World in Motion 1939 – the Whole of the Year's Automobile Production (1st ed.). Belvedere Publishing. ASIN B00ZLN91ZG.
- Sedgwick, Fred (2009). Where Words Come From: A Dictionary of Word Origins. A&C Black. ISBN 978-1-84706-274-1.
- Shirer, William (1990). The Rise and Fall of the Third Reich (50th Anniversary ed.). New York: Simon & Schuster. LCCN 90221762. OCLC 22888118. OL 1978420M.
- Stehr, Christoph (2 February 2016). "Das machen wir mal lieber neu" [We Probably Ought to do that Again]. Der Spiegel (in German). Archived from the original on 7 February 2016.
- Tooze, Adam (2006). The Wages of Destruction: The Making and Breaking of the Nazi Economy. London: Allen Lane. ISBN 978-0-7139-9566-4. "Even if the war had not intervened, developments up to 1939 made clear that the entire conception of the 'people's car' was a disastrous flop."
- Ziady, Hanna (9 February 2021). "Volkswagen Is Exploring Flying Vehicles in China". CNN. London.
