= 1970 Round Australia Trial =

1970 Round Australia Trial Ampol Trial
← Previous event	Next event →
- Host country: Australia
- Rally base: Alice Springs; Sydney
- Dates run: 24 June – 5 July 1970
- Stages: 10
- Stage surface: Tarmac and Gravel
- Overall distance: 10,200 km (6,300 miles)

Statistics
- Crews: 160 at start, 112 at finish

Overall results
- Overall winner: (France) Jean-Claude Ogier (France) Lucette Ogier & (Kenya) Edgar Herrmann (Germany) Hans Schüller (Australia) Citroën Cars Pty Ltd & (Australia) Datsun Racing Team

The 1970 Round Australia Trial, officially the Ampol Trial was the eleventh running of the Round Australia Trial. The rally took place between 24 June and 5 July 1970. The event covered 10,200 kilometres around Australia. It was jointly won by Jean-Claude Ogier and Lucette Ogier, driving a Citroën DS 21 & Edgar Herrmann and Hans Schüller, driving a Datsun 1600 SSS.

== Results ==
Pos	No	Entrant	Drivers	Car	Penalties (Points)
1	11	(Australia) Citroën Cars Pty Ltd	(France) Jean-Claude Ogier (France) Lucette Ogier	Citroën DS 21	60
2	23	(Australia) Datsun Racing Team	(Kenya) Edgar Herrmann (Germany) Hans Schüller	Datsun 1600 SSS	60
3	20	(Australia) Holden Dealer Team	(Australia) Colin Bond (Australia) Brian Hope (Australia) Tony Roberts	Holden Monaro HT GTS 350	76
4	73	Ford Motor Company of Australia	(Australia) Jack Ellis (Australia) Bob Forsyth (Australia) John Taylor	Ford Falcon XW 500 GS	95
5	40	Mitsubishi Australia Pty Ltd	(Australia) Doug Stewart (Australia) George Shepheard	Mitsubishi Colt	97
6	27	Mitsubishi Australia Pty Ltd	(Australia) Doug Chivas (Australia) Bob Riley	Mitsubishi Colt	129
7	68	Mitsubishi Australia Pty Ltd	(Australia) Barry Lloyd (Australia) Albert Browne	Mitsubishi Colt	138
8	28	(Australia) Citroën Cars Pty Ltd	(Australia) David McKay (Australia) Graham Watson	Citroën DS 21	145
9	80	(Australia) Datsun Distributors Pty Ltd	(Australia) Stewart McLeod (Australia) Jack Lock	Datsun 1600	169
10	77	(Australia) Mazda Automobile Club of NSW	(Australia) Allan Lawson (Australia) Garry Connelly	Mazda R100	176
11	35	Ford Motor Company of Australia	(Australia) Bruce Hodgson (Australia) Graham Hoinville	Ford Falcon XW 500 GS	179
12	29	(Australia) Lister and Laws Racing	(Australia) Gerry Lister (Australia) John Laws (Australia) Bill Nolan	Volvo 142S	183
13	51	(Australia) Holden Dealer Team	(Australia) Barry Ferguson (Australia) David Johnson	Holden Monaro HT GTS 350	190
14	195	(Australia) Layton Gale Distributors	(Australia) Barry Burns (Australia) Ray Glendenning (Australia) James Conaghty	Datsun 1600	209
15	14	Ford Motor Company of Australia	(Australia) Frank Kilfoyle (Australia) Doug Rutherford	Ford Falcon XW 500 GS	220
16	59	(Australia) Renault Rally Team	(Australia) Bruce Collier (Australia) Lindsay Adcock	Renault 16 TS	225
17	226	(Australia) W.B. Glass	(Australia) Wal Glass (Australia) Gary Owens (Australia) David Balmain	Holden Monaro HK GTS 327	228
18	39	(Australia) Holden Dealer Team	(Australia) John Keran (Australia) Roger Bonhomme	Holden Monaro HT GTS 350	269
19	16	(Australia) TVW Limited	(Australia) Ken Tubman (Australia) Lyndon McLeod	Triumph 2.5 PI Mark II	303
20	2	(Australia) Mazda House Pty Ltd	(Australia) Richard Harris (Australia) Nigel Collier	Mazda R100	311
21	32	(Australia) Greg Cusack Pty Ltd	(Australia) Robert Tanner (Australia) John Sedaltis	Volkswagen 1500	318
22	66	(Australia) Cloughs Sales and Service	(Australia) Jack Mullins (Australia) Edward Mulligan	Peugeot 404	325
23	148	(Australia) Michael Goddard	(Australia) Michael Goddard (Australia) Dr. Eddie Watson	Fiat 125	341
24	7	(Australia) Young and Green Pty Ltd	(Australia) Jim Sullivan (Australia) Peter Mullin	Holden HT Kingswood	351
25	124	(Australia) Gunars Feizaks	(Australia) Gunars Feizaks (Australia) Edward Molan	Holden HT Premier	363
26	49	(Australia) Bruce Keogh	(Australia) Bruce Keogh (Australia) Ross Farmer (Australia) Ross Kelly	Holden HK Kingswood	373
27	75	(Australia) Bruce Mudd	(Australia) Bruce Mudd (Australia) Ross Giddins	Renault 16 TS	378
28	196	(Australia) R.A. Wilson	(Australia) Robert Wilson (Australia) W.P. Wilson	Mitsubishi Colt 1100F	378
29	8	(Australia) B.L. Amey	(Australia) Brian Amey (Australia) Gordon Frohling	Peugeot 403B	383
30	191	(Australia) John Darcy	(Australia) John Darcy (Australia) David Buchan	Ford Falcon XW GT	404
31	220	(Australia) B.A. Cheesman	(Australia) Bruce Cheesman (Australia) Graham Pinnell	Volkswagen 1500	413
32	60	(Australia) Jack Murray, Jr	(Australia) John Murray (Australia) James Sampson (Australia) Max Stahl	Holden Monaro HT GTS 350	414
33	110	(Australia) G.A. Robertson	(Australia) Graeme Robertson (Australia) Andrew Robertson (Australia) Ian Peterson	Holden HK	429
34	76	Porsche Distributors Australia-New Zealand	(Australia) Alan Hamilton (Australia) Bill Flatman	Porsche 911T	456
35	192	(Australia) H.J. Moloney	(Australia) Hal Moloney (Australia) Paul O'Bryan (Australia) Christopher Hall	Ford Falcon XP	479
36	131	(Australia) Eric Vigar	(Australia) Eric Vigar (Australia) Trevor Fear	Mitsubishi Colt 1100	483
37	6	(Australia) Wes Nalder	(Australia) Wes Nalder (Australia) John Fish	Toyota Corolla SL	486
38	212	(Australia) C.C. Alexander	(Australia) Colin Alexander (Australia) Paul Older	Volvo 142S	536
39	155	(Australia) Tom Bentley	(Australia) Tom Bentley (Australia) Laurie Boyle (Australia) Colin Cox	Volkswagen 1500	543
40	132	(Australia) A.R. Lane	(Australia) Adrian Lane (Australia) Col Rush	Ford Cortina GT Mark II	551
41	19	(Australia) Mainstyle Motor Accessories Pty Ltd	(Australia) Graham Webber (Australia) Rainer Strassberger (Australia) Ron Pulvis	Datsun 1600	563
42	98	(Australia) Territory Motel Alice Springs	(Australia) Rex Law (Australia) Amos Smith	Volkswagen Beetle	566
43	173	(Australia) Robert K. Jackson	(Australia) Kevin Williams (Australia) Harry Smith	Holden Monaro HT GTS	566
44	209	(Australia) J.W. Hatchell-Brown	(Australia) John Hatchell-Brown (Australia) David White	Morris Cooper S	702
45	79	(Australia) Tynan Motors	(Australia) Peter Cray (Australia) Peter Brown	Mazda R100	805
46	104	(Australia) M.F McGinley	(Australia) Maxwell McGinley (Australia) Robert Bell (Australia) Graham Harrison	Holden HD X2	870
47	121	(Australia) Parade Motors	(Australia) Dennis Dix (Australia) Ross Loader (Australia) Peter Finch	Holden HR	875
48	100	(Australia) Mal Longmore	(Australia) Mal Longmore (Australia) Peter Robinson	Datsun 1600	887
49	167	(Australia) M.D. Meade	(Australia) Melville Meade (Australia) Clark Ballard	Volkswagen 1500 S	954
50	58	(Australia) Aub Barker	(Australia) Aub Barker (Australia) David Bye	Ford Escort GT Mark I	994
51	164	(Australia) Team Flynn and Martin	(Australia) Jim Flynn (Australia) Bill Martin	Toyota Corolla	1,032
52	114	(Australia) Team Edwards and Hamilton	(Australia) John Edwards (Australia) Kenneth Hamilton	Ford Escort Mark I	1,044
53	31	(Papua New Guinea) PNG Motors Limited	(Papua New Guinea) John Smith (Papua New Guinea) Noel Chay	Subaru 1000	1,134
54	22	(Australia) Horsley Brothers Pty Ltd	(Australia) Malcolm Horsley (Australia) John Horsley	Honda S800	1,277
55	128	(Australia) C.H. Lund, Jr.	(Australia) Charles Lund, Jr. (Australia) Thomas Hayden	Mazda R100	1,317
56	165	(Australia) Peter Godson	(Australia) Peter Godson (Australia) Brian McClelland	Datsun 1600	1,321
57	18	(Australia) Bruce Mead	(Australia) Bruce Mead (Australia) Ian Faulkner	Volvo 142S	1,542
58	208	(Australia) J.M. Darlington	(Australia) John Darlington (Australia) A.H. Molyneaux (Australia) Brian McEllinney	Volvo 142S	1,558
59	21	(Australia) Richard P. Creed	(Australia) Richard Creed (Australia) Bill Philip	Holden Torana LC GTR	1,717
60	181	(Australia) Kittle Bros Pty Ltd	(Australia) R. Miller (Australia) F. Duller (Australia) Tony Wunderlich	Holden Monaro HT GTS 350	1,726
61	218	(Australia) Gary Perkins	(Australia) Gary Perkins (Australia) Trevor Wyatt	Volkswagen Beetle	1,790
62	94	(Australia) Bruce Ballantyne	(Australia) Bruce Ballantyne (Australia) Peter Evans (Australia) Philip Primrose	Holden HT Kingswood	1,989
63	17	(Australia) Datsun Distributors Pty Ltd	(Australia) Alison Packer (Australia) Carole Waldron	Datsun 1600	2,004
64	183	(Australia) Eric Peirce	(Australia) Eric Peirce (Australia) Ian Beckwith (Australia) Terry Lynch	Ford Falcon XW	2,280
65	204	(Australia) J.J. Emmelkamp	(Australia) Jacob Emmelkamp (Australia) Noel Elliott (Australia) Glyn Thomas	Peugeot 404	2,321
66	10	(Australia) Keswick Motors	(Australia) William Potter (Australia) Colin Potter (Australia) David Coulter	Morris 1500	2,493
67	198	(Australia) Carlo Duregon	(Australia) Carlo Duregon (Australia) Rex Davies (Australia) Anthony Dawson	Holden Monaro HT GTS 350	2,598
68	95	(Australia) R.B. Beer	(Australia) Peter Davis (Australia) Robert Beer	Mitsubishi Colt 1100	2,632
69	37	(Australia) Renault Rally Team	(Australia) Mal McPherson (Australia) Robin Sharpley	Renault 16 TS	2,638
70	151	(Australia) Michael Nudi	(Australia) Michael Nudi (Australia) Ronald Clape	Austin 1800	2,681
71	4	(Australia) Newmarket Hotel	(Australia) Vic Wilson (Australia) Warren Wilson	Peugeot 404	2,723
72	118	(Australia) Condell Park Auto Part	(Australia) Mick Madden (Australia) Colin Byrne (Australia) William Adams	Holden EH 179	3,242
73	1	(Australia) George Daniel	(Australia) George Daniel (Australia) Wolfgang Slide	Volkswagen 1500	3,275
74	87	(Australia) Ian Oxenford	(Australia) Ian Oxenford (Australia) Brian Mephem	Volvo 122S	3,295
75	190	Renault Car Club of Australia	(Australia) Walter Williams (Australia) Ron Britt (Australia) Bruce Kops	Holden Monaro HT	3,308
76	30	(Australia) Gary Mecak	(Australia) Gary Mecak (Australia) James Laing-Peach	Ford Cortina GT Mark II	3,467
77	36	(Australia) R.B. Mitchell	(Australia) Ronald Mitchell (Australia) Graham Rossmore (Australia) Mark Duder	Renault 16 TS	3,599
78	130	(Australia) Team Kahl and Hawkins	(Australia) Robert Kahl (Australia) Doug Hawkins	Holden Monaro HT GTS 350	3,650
79	38	(Australia) Renault Rally Team	(Australia) Bob Watson (Australia) Jim McAuliffe	Renault 16 TS	3,885
80	13	(Australia) The Advertiser-United Motors	(Australia) Robert Jennings (Australia) Malcolm Annells	Holden Monaro HT GTS	4,227
81	12	(Australia) Slerp Brothers and 5DN Adelaide	(Australia) Dale Wilson (Australia) Kevin Brown	Volkswagen 1500	4,274
82	133	(Australia) Alderman Keith Jones	(Australia) Keith Jones (Australia) John Woolnough	Riley 2.5 Litre	4,431
83	61	(Australia) Midways of Beenleigh	(Australia) Ann Thomson (Australia) Toni Lefrancke (Australia) Pam Elam	Holden HT Kingswood	4,439
84	123	(Australia) Ron Hartridge	(Australia) Ron Hartridge (Australia) G. Hartridge (Australia) P. Seccull	Alfa Romeo Giulia Super	4,576
85	71	(Australia) The Independent Newspaper Perth	(Australia) Bob Bullock (Australia) John Large (Australia) Laurie Gugiatti	Volvo 142S	5,100
86	90	(Australia) Philip George	(Australia) Philip George (Australia) Neville Curran	Fiat 1500	5,320
87	103	(Australia) W.G. Bell	(Australia) Wilson Bell (Australia) Robert McDonald	Ford Falcon XP	5,649
88	88	(Australia) J.E. Irvine	(Australia) John Irvine (Australia) Raymond Billeau	Mazda R100	5,830
89	172	(Australia) K.H. Sutton	(Australia) Keith Sutton (Australia) Richard Sutton (Australia) Brian Paull	Holden HT Kingswood	5,992
90	57	(Australia) Les Morgan	(Australia) Les Morgan (Australia) Robert Patterson	Morris De Luxe	6,065
91	223	(Australia) N.F. Ferguson	(Australia) N. Ferguson (Australia) Geoffrey Crane (Australia) Barry Ryan	Ford Falcon XR 500	6,301
92	202	(Australia) D.G. Bray	(Australia) Duncan Bray (Australia) Peter Sugden	Ford Cortina Lotus Mark II	6,486
93	43	(Australia) E.A. Ross	(Australia) Elizabeth Ross (Australia) Sandra Leslie Van Loon (Australia) Diane Lewis	Volvo 122S	6,525
94	85	(Australia) G.G. Sawyer	(Australia) Geoffrey Sawyer (Australia) Harold Brown	Ford Falcon XT	6,818
95	199	(Australia) Team Taylor and Moore	(Australia) Bruce Taylor (Australia) Bruce Moore	Renault 16 TS	7,090
96	50	(Australia) City Motors Pty Ltd	(Australia) Darryl Williams (Australia) Adrian Mortimer (Australia) Nick Hatzl	Holden Monaro HT GTS 350	7,450
97	24	(Australia) Nanda Macaroni Products Pty Ltd	(Australia) Orlando Basile (Australia) Clive Bardell (Australia) Fred Reinhardt	Fiat 124	8,425
98	217	(Australia) T.H. Meek	(Australia) Thomas Meek (Australia) Hayden Meek	Austin 1800	8,486
99	56	(Australia) Woman's Day Magazine-Renault Rally Team	(Australia) Lynn Keeffe (Australia) Sue Ransom (Australia) Vivien Holliwell	Renault 16 TS	8,926
100	69	(Australia) Southern Motors Pty Ltd	(Australia) Murray Thomas (Australia) Bill Butler	Škoda 110L	9,333
101	53	(Australia) M.G. Pettit	(Australia) Max Pettit (Australia) Louis Levi (Australia) Alan Esson	Holden Torana LC 2600 SL	10,116
102	180	(Australia) H.R. Williams	(Australia) Horace Williams (Australia) J. Camilleri	Datsun 1600	11,814
103	119	(Australia) D.F. Auld	(Australia) David Auld (Australia) Geoffrey Cooper (Australia) Alwyn McMillan	Mercury 1947 Eight	12,132
104	129	(Australia) R.J. Barkell	(Australia) Robert Barkell (Australia) Jeffrey O'Meara (Australia) Russell Bennett	Holden EH Station Wagon	12,196
105	146	(Australia) Doug Mulholland	(Australia) Doug Mulholland (Australia) Anne Mulholland	Volkswagen Beetle	12,458
106	143	(Australia) D.I. Parsons	(Australia) D. Parsons (Australia) D. Parsons	Ford Cortina Mark II	12,789
107	213	(Australia) Motor Manual	(Australia) Len Shaw (Australia) Sean Walsh	Morris 1500	13,029
108	186	(Australia) Team Marshall and Berriman	(Australia) Peter Marshall (Australia) Peter Berriman	Volkswagen 1500 TS	13,417
109	160	(Australia) Ken Garner	(Australia) Ken Garner (Australia) Robert Williams (Australia) Barry Taylor	Holden HR	14,316
110	169	(Australia) G.W. McDonald	(Australia) Gary McDonald (Australia) Peter Lawler	Holden Torana LC GTR	15,795
111	211	(Australia) P.G. Booker	(Australia) Philip Booker (Australia) Mark Sanders	Volkswagen 1500 S	17,437
112	105	(Australia) Team O'Dwyer and Spence	(Australia) Maurice O'Dwyer (Australia) Leslie Spence	Dodge 1936 Coupe	17,931
