= Tasmania vs Victoria (1960) =

Australian rules football match

- Match programme cover
Tasmania	Victoria
13.13 (91)	12.12 (84)
	1	2	3	4
TAS	4.5 (29)	7.6 (48)	10.8 (68)	13.13 (91)
VIC	1.6 (12)	5.10 (40)	8.11 (59)	12.12 (84)
- Date: 13 June 1960
- Stadium: York Park
- Attendance: 15,600

On Monday, 13 June 1960 (Queen's Birthday holiday), the Tasmanian state team hosted a Victorian state team in an interstate Australian rules football match at York Park, Launceston. The Tasmanian team won by seven points, considered one of the biggest interstate football upset victories of all time, and one of the greatest moments in the history of Tasmanian football. It was the first of only two victories by Tasmania against a Victorian Football League or Victorian state of origin team, from a total of 29 matches. A then-record Launceston crowd of 15,613 attended the game.

Tasmania played the better football early, and opened a 17 point lead at quarter time. Victoria fought back gradually throughout the day, and hit the front for the first time ten minutes into the final quarter. A tight contest ensued, and the scores remained level with only two minutes remaining; but, Tasmania kicked the final goal of the game and ended by winning by seven points, 13.13 (91) d. 12.12 (84).

== Teams ==
=== Tasmania ===
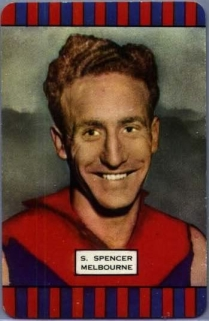
Tasmania captain Stuart Spencer.

The Tasmanian team, as usual, was selected among players from the three major senior leagues. The 1960 team demonstrated the rise of the North West Football Union as a senior football body, as it was the first time that more union players had been selected than league or association players. Additionally, the original choice for captain of the team, the union's Darrel Baldock, was the first player who had never previously played in the TANFL to be selected captain – although he ultimately missed the game with injury and the league's Stuart Spencer became captain.

Tasmania
B:	Casey Lawrence (NTFA)	Brian Loring (NWFU)	Don Gale (NWFU)
HB:	Max Kelleher (NTFA)	Barry Strange (NWFU)	Murray Steele (TANFL)
C:	John Fitzallen (NTFA)	Ken Sheehan (NWFU)	Dicky Lester (TANFL)
HF:	Neil Conlan (NWFU)	John Hawksley (NTFA)	Colin Moore (NWFU)
F:	Burnie Payne (TANFL)	Athol Webb (TANFL)	Garth Smith (NWFU)
Foll:	Rex Geard (TANFL)	Terry Shadbolt (NWFU)	Stuart Spencer (TANFL) (c)
Int:	George Mason (NWFU)	Bob Withers (NTFA)	
Coach:	Jack Metherall		

=== Victoria ===
The Victorian team was selected from among Victorian Football League players, and included one player of Tasmanian origin: Verdun Howell. The team was the weaker of two VFL representative teams engaged in interstate football on the day: the first choice VFL team was playing an interstate match against South Australia in Melbourne on the same day, and the second choice team travelled to Launceston for the match against Tasmania.

Victoria
B:	Bruce Comben (Carlton) (c)	Verdun Howell (St Kilda)	John Winneke (Hawthorn)
HB:	Geoff Case (Melbourne)	Paddy Guinane (Richmond)	Ken Jones (Fitzroy)
C:	Dick Grimmond (Richmond)	Lance Oswald (St Kilda)	Laurie Dwyer (North Melbourne)
HF:	Ken Fraser (Essendon)	Max Oaten (South Melbourne)	Graham Campbell (Fitzroy)
F:	John Peck (Hawthorn)	Murray Weideman (Collingwood)	John Birt (Essendon)
Foll:	Frank Johnson (South Melbourne)	Hugh Mitchell (Essendon)	Billy Goggin (Geelong)
Int:	John O'Connell (Geelong)	Ray Walker (Footscray)	
Coach:	Bruce Comben (Carlton)		
