= 1964 Round Australia Trial =

1964 Round Australia Trial Ampol Trial
← Previous event	Next event →
- Host country: Australia
- Rally base: Sydney
- Dates run: 14 – 28 June 1964
- Stages: 16
- Stage surface: Tarmac and Gravel
- Overall distance: 11,260 km (7,000 miles)

Statistics
- Crews: 147 at start, 101 at finish

Overall results
- Overall winner: Harry Firth; Graham Hoinville; Ford Motor Company of Australia

The 1964 Round Australia Trial, officially the Ampol Trial was the tenth running of the Round Australia Trial. The rally took place between 14 and 28 June 1964. The event covered 11,260 kilometres around Australia. It was won by Harry Firth and Graham Hoinville, driving a Ford Cortina GT.

== Results ==
Pos	No	Entrant	Drivers	Car	Penalties (Points)
1	50	Ford Motor Company of Australia	(Australia) Harry Firth (Australia) Graham Hoinville	Ford Cortina GT	21
2	60	(Australia) Lanock Motors	(Australia) Barry Ferguson (Australia) Tony Denham	Volkswagen 1500 S	25
3	106	(Australia) Pat Cullens Garage	(Australia) Greg Garard (Australia) John Garard	Holden EH 179 Manual	25
4	40	(Australia) Lanock Motors	(Australia) Doug Stewart (Australia) Barry Lloyd	Volkswagen 1500 S	28
5	91	(Australia) Pat Cullens Garage	(Australia) Lionel Williams (Australia) Steve Halloran (Australia) Terry Gould	Holden EH 179 Manual	31
6	122	(Australia) Kain and Shelton Limited	(Australia) Tom Quill (Australia) Roger Abrahams	Ford Falcon XL 170ci	43
7	39	(Australia) Enterprise Auto Service	(Australia) Barry Arentz (Australia) Geoff Stock	Ford Cortina GT	51
8	109	(Australia) Bruce Collier	(Australia) Bruce Collier (Australia) John Bryson	Holden EH 179 Manual	55
9	117	(Australia) A.J. Thiel	(Australia) Tony Thiel (Australia) Garry Chapman	Ford Falcon XM 170ci	57
10	112	(Australia) B.S. Stillwell and Co. Pty. Ltd.	(Australia) Malcolm McPherson (Australia) Ian Home	Holden EH 179 Manual	71
11	115	(Australia) L.L. Fiebig	(Australia) Lance Fiebig (Australia) Gilbert Ahrens	Holden EH 179 Manual	88
12	103	(Australia) Ron Marshall	(Australia) Ron Marshall (Australia) Ian Butcher	Holden EH 179 Manual	95
13	41	(Australia) W.F. Hartigan	(Australia) William Hartigan (Australia) Martin Hartigan	Volvo 122S	95
14	44	(Australia) Goodwin Motors	(Australia) Harold Goodwin (Australia) Terry Robinson (Australia) Tom Edwards	Volvo 122S	97
15	70	(Australia) Victorian VW Agents	(Australia) Ray Christie (Australia) David Dunlop	Volkswagen 1500 S	106
16	121	Ford Motor Company of Australia	(Australia) Ken Harper (Australia) Frank Kilfoyle (Australia) Bob Forsyth	Ford Falcon XM 170ci	109
17	108	(Australia) Pat Cullens Garage	(Australia) Pat Cullen (Australia) Mark Markwell	Holden EH 179 Manual	122
18	64	(Australia) Continental and General Distributors	(Australia) Ron Green (Australia) David Johnson	Peugeot 404	123
19	114	(Australia) Kevin Bell	(Australia) Kevin Bell (Australia) Ron Wilcock (Australia) Lionel Long	Holden EH 179 Manual	134
20	61	(Australia) Graham Ward	(Australia) Graham Ward (Australia) Bruce McPhee	Volvo 122S	143
21	104	(Australia) Seike Motors	(Australia) Maurie Seike (Australia) Keith Hughes (Australia) Robert Beasley	Chrysler Valiant AP5	162
22	113	(Australia) South Sydney Junior Rugby League Club	(Australia) Jim Johnson (Australia) David Harris	Holden EH 179 Manual	163
23	7	(Australia) Tom Bentley	(Australia) Tom Bentley (Australia) Dean Ryan (Australia) Bob Johnson	Volkswagen 1200	171
24	55	(Australia) Alan Crabbe Motors	(Australia) Alan Crabbe (Australia) Des Pike	Peugeot 404	177
25	13	(Australia) Peter Warren Motors	(Australia) Don Garard (Australia) Jim Roberts	Volkswagen 1200	178
26	80	(Australia) Ray Heffernan	(Australia) Ray Heffernan (Australia) Des Turner	Fiat 770	224
27	47	(Australia) Laurie Boyle	(Australia) Laurie Boyle (Australia) Graham Jones (Australia) Robert Schaefer	Hillman Super Minx	231
28	140	(Australia) Cronulla Tool & Engineering Co.	(Australia) John Priddle (Australia) Lindsay Adcock	Ford Zephyr Mark II	245
29	63	(Japan) Toyota Motor Company Limited	(Australia) Geoff Russell (Australia) Ron Burns	Toyota Crown	247
30	75	(Australia) Hemco Safety Belts	(Australia) Stewart Hughes (Australia) Alan Mottram	Ford Anglia	254
31	142	(Australia) Bill Burns	(Australia) Bill Burns (Australia) Brian Lawler (Australia) Bruce Kaye	Fiat 2300	258
32	93	(Australia) Milo Team Murray	(Australia) Jack 'Crackerjack' Murray, Jnr. (Australia) Peter Barnes	Chrysler Valiant AP5	262
33	45	(Australia) G.L. Crown	(Australia) Gerry Crown (Australia) Nigel Collier	Ford Cortina GT	264
34	17	(Australia) Dalex Motors	(Australia) Alan Leahey (Australia) Don Hyam	Volkswagen 1200	274
35	62	(Australia) Bruce Hodgson	(Australia) Bruce Hodgson (Australia) Ralph Baulch	Ford Cortina GT	276
36	59	(Australia) Continental and General Distributors	(Australia) Bob Holden (Australia) Monty Love	Peugeot 404	290
37	33	(Australia) J.A. Witter	(Australia) Jack Witter (Australia) Ron Maloney	Volkswagen 1200	296
38	126	(Australia) NSW Banana Board	(Australia) Russ Hammond (Australia) Jim Palmer	Chrysler Valiant AP5 Safari Wagon	296
39	19	(Czech Republic) Motokov	(Australia) Ron Bird (Australia) Jim Horman	Škoda Octavia	327
40	54	(Australia) Continental and General Distributors	(Australia) Jack 'Gelignite' Murray (Australia) Roy Denny	Peugeot 404	333
41	1	(Australia) VW Motors Pty Ltd	(Australia) Leigh Moore (Australia) Pat Lawless	Volkswagen 1200	347
42	136	(Australia) B.G. Sloane	(Australia) Keith Dosser (Australia) John Weare (Australia) Graham Robinson	Holden EK	347
43	128	(Australia) Eric Vigar	(Australia) Eric Vigar (Australia) Neil Morrison (Australia) Graham Stafford	Ford 1958 Customline	363
44	37	(Australia) Regal Motors	(Australia) Brian Hilton (Australia) David Duncan	Morris 1100	371
45	116	(Australia) Bob Gudgeon	(Australia) Bob Gudgeon (Australia) Henry Jenkins	Holden EH 179 Manual	377
46	20	(Australia) Team Travelodge	(Australia) Ken Tubman (Australia) Alan Greenway	Morris 1100	385
47	16	(Australia) Light Motors	(Australia) Adrian Callery (Australia) John Lock	Volkswagen 1200	393
48	35	(Australia) Western Australian VW Agents	(Australia) George Reynolds (Australia) Ivan Tighe	Volkswagen 1200	398
49	48	(Australia) Commercial Motor Vehicles Pty Ltd	(Australia) Lance Grosser (Australia) P. McCarthur	Hillman Super Minx	416
50	52	(Australia) Henry Dalton	(Australia) Henry Dalton (Australia) Neils Hansen	Hillman Super Minx	417
51	150	(Australia) Fred & Mary Murray	(Australia) Fred Murray (Australia) Mary Murray (Australia) Keith Thallon	Ford Falcon XM 144ci	426
52	111	(Australia) A.A. Anderson	(Australia) 'Duck' Anderson (Australia) Tony Anthony	Chrysler Valiant AP5	440
53	152	(Australia) Canberra Speed Shop	(Australia) Jack Byrne (Australia) Ray Gulson	Morris Cooper	446
54	86	(Australia) Wes Nalder	(Australia) Wes Nalder (Australia) Trevor Stanley	Hillman Imp	451
55	151	(Australia) R.W. Haycock	(Australia) Bill Haycock (Australia) Garry Welsh (Australia) Noel Bottle	Ford Falcon XM Pursuit	455
56	4	(Australia) C.J. Bond	(Australia) Colin Bond (Australia) George Shepheard (Australia) Andy Frankel	Volkswagen 1200	460
57	51	(Japan) Toyota Motor Company Limited	(Australia) Doug Hughes (Australia) Ross Farmer	Toyota Crown	462
58	8	(Australia) Joe Freedman	(Australia) Joe Freedman (Australia) Hayden Cadwallader	Volkswagen 1200	474
59	53	(Australia) David Tweedle	(Australia) David Tweedle (Australia) Marshall McCarroll (Australia) Jim Smith	Standard Vanguard	477
60	74	(Australia) Yorkshire Insurance	(Australia) Jacqueline Price (Australia) Neville Price	Ford Anglia	480
61	29	(Australia) Mrs Maureen Adams	(Australia) Maureen Adams (Australia) Yvonne Johnson	Volkswagen 1200	483
62	67	(Australia) Sports Car World	(Australia) Ron Phillips (Australia) Ian Smith	Porsche 356	484
63	153	(Australia) Preston Motors	(Australia) Bob Watson (Australia) Tom Myers	Holden EH 179 Manual	504
64	5	(Australia) Lanock Motors	(Australia) Yvonne McKeahnie (Australia) Gayle Sach	Volkswagen 1200	512
65	94	(Australia) John Newmarch	(Australia) John Newmarch (Australia) Tim Bonython	Chrysler Valiant AP5	540
66	43	(Japan) Toyota Motor Company Limited	(Japan) Shihomi Hosoya (Japan) Masaharu Terao	Toyota Crown	542
67	98	(Australia) Don Faulkner Motors	(Australia) Evan Thomas (Australia) Les Barren	Holden EH 179 Manual	549
68	146	(Australia) W. Huezenroder	(Australia) W. Huezenroder (Australia) Jimmy Sweet (Australia) Stewart McLeod	Holden EK	552
69	68	(Australia) Wal Truscott and Company	(Australia) John Hiscock (Australia) Wal Truscott (Australia) Bill Roche	Humber Vogue Sports	584
70	30	(Australia) Geoff Hood	(Australia) Geoff Hood (Australia) Pat Crea	Volkswagen 1200	589
71	65	(Australia) Bill McLaughlin	(Australia) Bill McLaughlin (Australia) Alan Clarke	Ford Cortina GT	592
72	139	Ford Motor Company of Australia	(Australia) George Hughes (Australia) Peter Coffey (Australia) Doug Rutherford	Ford Falcon XM 144ci	619
73	36	(Australia) Keith Gamble	(Australia) Keith Gamble (Australia) John Old	Datsun 1200	649
74	34	(Czech Republic) Motokov	(Australia) Syd Fischer (Australia) Bill Coe	Škoda Octavia	682
75	58	(Australia) Ross and Hurst's Ampol Service Station	(Australia) Ron Turnley (Australia) Brian Cross (Australia) Alan Lockyer	Ford Cortina GT	702
76	46	(Japan) Toyota Motor Company Limited	(Australia) Kevin Lott (Australia) Michael Flanagan	Toyota Crown	709
77	131	(Australia) K.A. Dean	(Australia) Ken Dean (Australia) Edmond McGee	Holden EK Station Sedan	729
78	6	(Australia) Arthur Treloar	(Australia) Arthur Treloar (Australia) Richard Barker	Volkswagen 1200	797
79	28	(Australia) Bert Ruddy	(Australia) Bert Ruddy (Australia) Eric Johnson	Volkswagen 1200	814
80	69	(Australia) Reg Lunn	(Australia) Reg Lunn (Australia) Rex Lunn (Australia) Jeff King	Ford Cortina GT	842
81	105	(Australia) John Steward	(Australia) John Steward (Australia) Andrew Richards (Australia) Peter Richards	Chrysler Valiant SV1	851
82	76	(Australia) Tony Fuller	(Australia) John Stephens (Australia) Tony Fuller	Morris 850	865
83	57	(Australia) Claude Ruwolt	(Australia) Claude Ruwolt (Australia) Richard Ruwolt	Peugeot 404	884
84	87	(Australia) S.H. Badger	(Australia) Sidney Badger (Australia) Edward Cram	Morris 850	896
85	132	(Australia) Mal Longmore Ampol Garage	(Australia) Bruce Darke (Australia) Ron Willis	Holden FC	951
86	10	(Australia) Ken Ogie	(Australia) Ken Ogie (Australia) Trevor Smith	Volkswagen 1200	930
87	143	(Australia) D.C. Shooks	(Australia) Desmond Shooks (Australia) James Ubrihien	Holden FC	1,076
88	9	(Czech Republic) Motokov	(Australia) Gerry Merrett (Australia) Peter Buckley	Škoda Octavia	1,084
89	27	(Australia) Wilkinson Datsun	(Australia) Bruce Wilkinson (Australia) Peter Wilson	Datsun 1200	1,112
90	135	(Australia) Enterprise Auto Service	(Australia) Martin Arentz (Australia) Ron Williams	Ford Falcon XM 144ci	1,159
91	141	(Australia) Neil Harrod	(Australia) Neil Harrod (Australia) Les Ring	Holden FB Station Sedan	1,185
92	95	(Australia) Sunrise Eggs	(Australia) Blanche Brown (Australia) Vince Brown (Australia) Cathy Price	Rolls-Royce Phantom I	1,333
93	125	(Australia) R.A. Walker	(Australia) Bob Walker (Australia) Majorie Walker	Dodge Phoenix	1,367
94	11	(Australia) Mac's Car Sales	(Australia) Joan McAulay (Australia) Lorna Gamble	Datsun 1200	1,594
95	31	(Australia) Dorothy Sibley	(Australia) Dorothy Sibley (Australia) John Sibley	Volkswagen 1200	1,692
96	116	(Australia) Jack Baker	(Australia) Jack Baker (Australia) Ern Hines (Australia) Jack Guest	Chevrolet 1938 Master	1,841
97	133	(Australia) Harvey Lane	(Australia) Harvey Lane (Australia) Jim Thompson (Australia) Stan Viles	Holden FB	2,693
98	107	(Australia) Judy MacDonald	(Australia) Judy MacDonald (Australia) Scott MacDonald	Vauxhall 1938 Wyvern	2,821
99	3	(Australia) Goblin-BVC Vacuum Cleaners	(Australia) Tony Cornell (Australia) John Harris	Volkswagen 1200	3,296
100	88	(Australia) Warren West	(Australia) Warren West (Australia) Peter Harden	Renault Dauphine	3,950
101	78	(Australia) Lightburn & Company Limited	(Australia) Ted Polgreen (Australia) Ray Chapman	Lightburn Zeta	6,185
