= 1979 Round Australia Trial =

1979 Round Australia Trial Repco Reliability Trial
← Previous event
- Host country: Australia
- Rally base: Melbourne
- Dates run: 5 – 19 August 1979
- Stages: 134
- Stage surface: Tarmac and Gravel
- Overall distance: 19,000 km (12,000 miles)

Statistics
- Crews: 167 at start, 92 at finish

Overall results
- Overall winner: (Australia) Peter Brock (Australia) Matt Philip (Australia) Noel Richards (Australia) Holden Dealer Team

The 1979 Round Australia Trial, officially the Repco Reliability Trial was the twelfth running of the Round Australia Trial. The rally took place between 5 and 19 August 1979. It was won by Peter Brock, Matt Philip and Noel Richards, driving a Holden Commodore.

== Route ==
The 19,000 kilometre rally commenced at the Melbourne Showgrounds, circumnavigating Australia in a clockwise direction. Of the 167 entrants, 92 finished. Two competitors were killed after their car rolled near Kununurra.

== Results ==
| Pos | No | Entrant | Drivers | Car | Penalties (Time) No. of Controls Missed (Mc) |
|---|---|---|---|---|---|
| 1 | 05 | (Australia) Holden Dealer Team | (Australia) Peter Brock (Australia) Matt Philip (Australia) Noel Richards | Holden Commodore VB | 3hr 39min 18sec |
| 2 | 17 | (Australia) Holden Dealer Team | (Australia) Barry Ferguson (Australia) Wayne Bell (Australia) Dave Boddy | Holden Commodore VB | 3hr 52min 39sec |
| 3 | 3 | (Australia) Holden Dealer Team | (Kenya) Shekhar Mehta (Finland) Rauno Aaltonen (Australia) Barry Lake | Holden Commodore VB | 4hr 53min 39sec |
| 4 | 7 | (Australia) Volvo Dealer Team-Queensland | (Australia) Ross Dunkerton (Australia) Peter McKay (Australia) Geoff Jones | Volvo 244 GT | 8hr 24min 54sec |
| 5 | 9 | Ford Motor Company of Australia | (Australia) Greg Carr (Australia) Dave Morrow (Australia) Fred Gocentas | Ford Cortina TE | 9hr 12min 13sec |
| 6 | 81 | (Australia) Victoria Toyota Dealers | (Australia) Wes Nalder (Australia) Ian Richards (Australia) Geoff Boyd | Toyota Celica RA40 | 9hr 57min 25sec |
| 7 | 50 | (Australia) Gosford Dyno-Tune Centre | (Australia) Ian Hill (Australia) Dale Loader (Australia) Frank Neale | Mitsubishi Lancer | 12hr 24min 11sec |
| 8 | 1 | Porsche Cars Australia | (Kenya) Edgar Herrmann (Australia) Dean Rainsford | Porsche 911 Carrera | 12hr 39min 2sec |
| 9 | 8 | Porsche Cars Australia | (Germany) Jürgen Barth (Germany) Roland Kussmaul | Porsche 924 | 13hr 9min 3sec |
| 10 | 24 | (Australia) Tyrepower Limited | (Australia) Gil Davis (Australia) Phil Eather (Australia) Graham Toner | Datsun 180B | 16hr 9min 38sec |
| 11 | 11 | (Australia) King Gee Clothing Company | (Australia) Bob Watson (Australia) Garry Harrowfield | Peugeot 504 Diesel | 16hr 22min 18sec |
| 12 | 12 | (United States) U.S. Rally Team | (United States) Steve Mizel (United States) Rod Hall (United States) Rod Fricker (Australia) Adrian Mortimer | Chevrolet Blazer | 27hr 5min 38sec |
| 13 | 47 | (Australia) Robert Jackson | (Australia) Robert Jackson (Australia) Des West (Australia) Ross Jackson | Holden Commodore VB | 29hr 2min 6sec |
| 14 | 41 | (Australia) Darryl Rowney | (Australia) Darryl Rowney (Australia) Robert Wilson (Australia) Bob Tyson | Datsun 180B | 1mc 20hr 28min 18sec |
| 15 | 87 | (Australia) Balmains of Bega | (Australia) Max Roberts (Australia) Eric Waterson (Australia) Tony Carroll | Holden Commodore VB | 1mc 53hr 57min 8sec |
| 16 | 60 | (Australia) Arthur Davis | (Australia) Graham Clarke (Australia) Arthur Davis (Australia) Graham Burge | Datsun 180B | 3mc 33hr 22min 28sec |
| 17 | 63 | (Australia) Newcastle Broadcasting & Television (NBN-3) | (Australia) Murray Finlay (Australia) James Sullivan (Australia) Lyndon MacLeod | Holden Commodore VB | 3mc 33hr 23min 7sec |
| 18 | 92 | (Australia) Peter Hurrey | (Australia) Peter Hurrey (Australia) David Geddes | Toyota Celica RA40 | 4mc 27hr 46min 44sec |
| 19 | 76 | (Australia) Volvo Dealer Team-New South Wales | (Australia) Barbara Beveridge (Australia) Anne Heaney (Australia) Lynn Jarman | Volvo 244 DL | 5mc 30hr 34min 50sec |
| 20 | 53 | Volvo Dealer Team-South Australia | (Finland) John Miettunen (Australia) Russell Morgan (Finland) John Suominen | Volvo 244 DL | 5mc 40hr 25min 31sec |
| 21 | 160 | (Australia) Kevin McDiarmid | (Australia) Kevin McDiarmid (Australia) Peter Phegan (Australia) David Travis | Datsun 180B | 6mc 44hr 57min 10sec |
| 22 | 22 | (Australia) Shepparton Rally Team | (Australia) Geoff Portman (Australia) Doug Thompson (Australia) John Hammond | Datsun Stanza | 7mc 12hr 2min 5sec |
| 23 | 70 | (Australia) Townsville Sporting Car Club | (Australia) Ian McCubbin (Australia) Richard Kelly (Australia) David Guyatt | Holden Monaro HZ | 7mc 35hr 10min 9sec |
| 24 | 56 | (Australia) Peter de Vaus | (Australia) Ian Faulkner (Australia) Peter de Vaus (Australia) Keith Bateson | Peugeot 504 | 8mc 27hr 1min 55sec |
| 25 | 13 | Ford Motor Company of Australia | (Australia) George Fury (Australia) Roger Bonhomme (Australia) Monty Suffern | Ford Cortina TE | 10mc 14hr 10min 5sec |
| 26 | 144 | (Australia) Giddings Datsun | (Australia) Rod Jones (Australia) Trevor Seaman (Australia) John Giddings | Datsun 200B | 10mc 24hr 37min 53sec |
| 27 | 115 | (Australia) Melbourne University Car Club | (Australia) John Birrell (Australia) Brian Smith (Australia) Rosemary Nixon | Renault 16 TS | 10mc 50hr 50min 20sec |
| 28 | 152 | (Australia) Garry Geissler | (Australia) Grant O'Donnell (Australia) Garry Geissler (Australia) Andrew Gibson | Holden Torana LX | 10mc 54hr 47min 48sec |
| 29 | 28 | (Australia) Dick Smith Electronics | (Australia) Jack Murray (Australia) Jeff d'Albora (Australia) John Murray | Holden Commodore VB | 11mc 38hr 59min 34sec |
| 30 | 39 | Volvo Dealer Team-Western Australia | (Australia) Frank Johnson (Australia) Steve Vanderbyl | Volvo 242 GT | 12mc 25hr 2min 21sec |
| 31 | 31 | (Australia) Barry Dick | (Australia) Barry Lloyd (Australia) Malcolm Crockenberg (Australia) John Dick | Mitsubishi Colt | 13mc 41hr 51min 11sec |
| 32 | 74 | (Australia) Peter Flanagan | (Australia) Brett Goldsborough (Australia) Peter Flanagan (Australia) Phillip Grounds | Holden Commodore VB | 16mc 62hr 32min 0sec |
| 33 | 73 | (Australia) Peter Lockhart | (Australia) Peter Lockhart (Australia) Des Dunstan (Australia) Ian Finlayson | Holden Commodore VB | 17mc 42hr 24min 15sec |
| 34 | 208 | (Australia) Nicholas Penny | (Australia) Nicholas Penny (Australia) Andrew Kennard (Australia) David Brown | Holden Torana LH | 18mc 43hr 56min 4sec |
| 35 | 155 | (Australia) Lance Motors, St Marys | (Australia) Ray Lance (Australia) John Craft (Australia) Paul Robinson | Holden Commodore VB | 21mc 25hr 59min 52sec |
| 36 | 104 | (Australia) Ralph Boys | (Australia) Ralph Boys (Australia) Greg Vonthien | Ford F100 | 22mc 34hr 32min 22sec |
| 37 | 142 | (Australia) HMAS Cerberus Car Club | (Australia) Neil Turner (Australia) Keith Donohue (Australia) John Sparrow | Leyland P76 | 22mc 68hr 21min 16sec |
| 38 | 131 | (Australia) Dr. Wayne Herdy | (Australia) Wayne Herdy (Australia) Pat O'Kane (Australia) Brian Gramenz | Peugeot 504 | 22mc 68hr 21min 16sec |
| 39 | 146 | (Australia) David Sheridan | (Australia) David Sheridan (Australia) Richard Reid | Datsun 1600 | 23mc 41hr 6min 45sec |
| 40 | 120 | (Australia) Hal Moloney | (Australia) Hal Moloney (Australia) Ian Vitnell (Australia) Paul Daley | Leyland P76 | 23mc 49hr 42min 33sec |
| 41 | 82 | Christian Autosport Club of Australia | (Australia) George Kahler (Australia) Bruce Partridge (Australia) Wayne Simeon | Mazda RX-4 | 27mc 47hr 33min 7sec |
| 42 | 159 | (Australia) Jim Farmer | (Australia) Jim Farmer (Australia) Campbell Farmer (Australia) Ron Fraser | Leyland P76 | 27mc 58hr 22min 7sec |
| 43 | 78 | (Australia) Peter Foden | (Australia) Denis Baker (Australia) Bruce Young (Australia) Peter Foden | Leyland P76 | 29mc 60hr 34min 43sec |
| 44 | 14 | (Japan) Noriyuki Koseki | (Japan) Noriyuki Koseki (Japan) Yoshio Takaoka (Japan) Hiroshi Okazaki | Subaru Leone | 30mc 29hr 47min 12sec |
| 45 | 171 | (Australia) Grahame Heaton | (Australia) Grahame Heaton (Australia) Robert Shepheard (Australia) Brian Mann | Holden HJ Panel Van | 31mc 71hr 42min 57sec |
| 46 | 27 | (Canada) Autec Rallying | (Canada) Jock Wilson (Canada) Fred Baker (Canada) Helen Freeze | Mercedes-Benz 280S | 32mc 38hr 22min 14sec |
| 47 | 134 | (Australia) David Tattingham | (Australia) David Tattingham (Australia) Rob Geue (Australia) Peter Kemp | Holden EH | 32mc 44hr 7min 39sec |
| 48 | 101 | (Australia) Roger Ingerson | (Australia) Roger Ingerson (Australia) Jerry Wilson (Australia) David MacCulloch | Peugeot 404 | 32mc 44hr 40min 56sec |
| 49 | 98 | (Australia) Greg Nicholson | (Australia) Greg Nicholson (Australia) Alan Crawford | Mitsubishi Lancer | 32mc 46hr 15min 16sec |
| 50 | 141 | (Australia) Paul Lahiff | (Australia) Paul Lahiff (Australia) John Beath (Australia) Michael Clarke | Holden HR | 33mc 34hr 39min 38sec |
| 51 | 99 | (Australia) Les Boaden | (Australia) Les Boaden (Australia) Brian Atkins (Australia) Wayne Pritchard | Mazda RX-4 | 33mc 45hr 7min 55sec |
| 52 | 172 | (Australia) Graham Stockley | (Australia) Graham Stockley (Australia) Kevin O'Neil | Porsche 911E | 33mc 45hr 25min 50sec |
| 53 | 57 | (Australia) Gary Meehan | (Australia) Gary Meehan (Australia) Greg Gifford (Australia) Ken Gardiner | Holden Monaro HT GTS | 34mc 30hr 49min 26sec |
| 54 | 86 | (Australia) Steel Industries Auto Club | (Australia) Dave Colless (Australia) Ray Johnston (Australia) Richard McCoy | Datsun 1600 | 35mc 38hr 29min 3sec |
| 55 | 167 | (Australia) Quay Ford, Cairns | (Australia) Peter Roggenkamp (Australia) Terry Adair (Australia) Michael Eakin | Ford Escort GL | 36mc 47hr 36min 17sec |
| 56 | 202 | (Australia) Greg Walker | (Australia) Greg Walker (Australia) Mel McCann | Renault R12 Virage | 36mc 80hr 28min 3sec |
| 57 | 79 | (Australia) Doug Minett | (Australia) Doug Minett (Australia) Doug Chappie (Australia) Don Watson | Datsun 1600 | 38mc 48hr 52min 54sec |
| 58 | 61 | (Australia) Dave Potter Motors | (Australia) Dave Potter (Australia) Garry Bain | Mazda RX-3 | 39mc 25hr 24min 28sec |
| 59 | 35 | (Australia) John Taylor | (Australia) John Taylor (Australia) Robert Hunt | Rover 3500 | 39mc 60hr 24min 23sec |
| 60 | 37 | (Australia) Miss M. O'Shanesy | (Australia) Caroline O'Shanesy (Australia) Barbara Dean (Australia) Meg O'Shanesy | Fiat 131 Mirafori | 39mc 65hr 40min 3sec |
| 61 | 185 | (Australia) J&P Richardson | (Australia) Joe Richardson (Australia) Alan Daniel (Australia) Bruce Fullerton | Ford Falcon XD | 40mc 92hr 51min 14sec |
| 62 | 143 | (Australia) Russell Tyrie | (Australia) Ross Nielson (Australia) Jim Stewart (Australia) Russell Tyrie | Holden HQ | 41mc 32hr 29min 0sec |
| 63 | 187 | (Australia) John Gough | (Australia) John Gough (Australia) Ken Hutton (Australia) Tony Bishop | Holden Torana LJ | 44mc 34hr 37min 6sec |
| 64 | 140 | (Australia) Peter Glover | (Australia) Peter Glover (Australia) Peter Burke (Australia) John Hather | Volkswagen Beetle 1600 | 44mc 42min 37min 28sec |
| 65 | 90 | (Australia) Mick Myers | (Australia) Mick Myers (Australia) Mal Sinfield (Australia) Michael Myers | Peugeot 504 | 46mc 38hr 39min 50sec |
| 66 | 103 | (Australia) Dr. Jim Caudle | (Australia) Jim Caudle (Australia) Graham Drew (Australia) Wally Eisden | Datsun 1600 | 47mc 75hr 59min 55sec |
| 67 | 20 | (Australia) Olympic Tyre and Rubber Company | (Australia) Hans Tholstrup (Australia) Geoff Perry | Chevrolet C20 Pick Up | 51mc 46hr 20min 30sec |
| 68 | 186 | (Australia) Leo Smith | (Australia) Dick Bray (Australia) Kevin McMahon (Australia) Leo Smith | Valiant 770 Charger | 54mc 50hr 7min 53sec |
| 69 | 19 | (United States) Ron Clyborne | (United States) Ron Clyborne (United States) Jim Hayes (United States) Allen Turton | Ford F-250 Pick Up | 54mc 60hr 12min 2sec |
| 70 | 106 | (Australia) Ross Easton | (Australia) Ross Easton (Australia) Don Rayner (Australia) Reg Bell | Datsun 1600 | 54mc 61hr 16min 34sec |
| 70 | 179 | (Australia) Harold Rayner | (Australia) Harold Rayner (Australia) Barry Campbell (Australia) Robert Loader | Holden HT | 56mc 48hr 35min 58sec |
| 72 | 126 | (Australia) Tom Hayden | (Australia) Tom Hayden (Australia) John Phillis (Australia) Richard Hogan | Mazda RX-2 | 56mc 59hr 19min 42sec |
| 73 | 197 | (Australia) John Darby | (Australia) John Darby (Australia) John Clark (Australia) Colin Stewart | Holden HR | 58mc 40hr 57min 42sec |
| 74 | 178 | (Australia) Bolch Transport | (Australia) Mal Bolch (Australia) Vin Keane (Australia) Malcolm Owen | Holden Monaro HJ GTS | 59mc 53min 1min 3sec |
| 75 | 64 | (Australia) Alderman Keith Jones | (Australia) Keith Jones (Australia) Kim Jones (Australia) Peter Webber | Riley 2.5 Litre | 59mc 55hr 18min 55sec |
| 76 | 102 | (Australia) Mainway Car Sales | (Australia) Kevin Cafe (Australia) Robert Gurney (Australia) Anthony Dawson | Mazda RX-4 | 60mc 26hr 23min 1sec |
| 77 | 181 | (Australia) Tony Koch | (Australia) Tony Koch (Australia) Bill Darling (Australia) Albert Koch | Holden Commodore VB | 60mc 43hr 43min 40sec |
| 78 | 123 | (Australia) Ken Garner | (Australia) Ken Garner (Australia) Mick Madden (Australia) Allan Corben | Holden Torana LX | 64mc 25hr 29min 22sec |
| 79 | 194 | (Australia) James Donaghue | (Australia) Jim Donaghue (Australia) Stephen Logan (Australia) David Grace | Toyota Celica | 65mc 35hr 22min 16sec |
| 80 | 180 | (Australia) North Shore Sporting Car Club | (Australia) Greg Lunney (Australia) John Stanmore (Australia) Garry Tyler | Peugeot 504 | 69mc 78hr 23min 6sec |
| 81 | 189 | (Australia) John Spanbroek | (Australia) John Spanbroek (Australia) Rog Compton (Australia) John Plywright | Datsun 240K | 70mc 2hr 16min 58sec |
| 82 | 83 | (Australia) Toyoparts | (Australia) Bob Bird (Australia) Roger McKinnon | Toyota Corolla | 70mc 27hr 0min 31sec |
| 83 | 201 | (Australia) E.G. Fullager | (Australia) E. Fullager (Australia) Terry Fullager (Australia) Dot Fullager (Australia) Donna Fullager | Holden Monaro HT GTS | 72mc 37hr 4min 14sec |
| 84 | 55 | (Australia) McArthur Rally Team | (Australia) Peter McArthur (Australia) Greg McArthur (Australia) Merawyn McArthur | Ford Falcon XY | 72mc 63hr 25min 39sec |
| 85 | 207 | (Australia) Jim Reinders | (Australia) Jim Reinders (Australia) John Lewis | Holden FJ | 73mc 36hr 11min 53sec |
| 86 | 117 | (Australia) Mark Ferrier | (Australia) Mark Ferrier (Australia) Ted Smith | Honda Civic | 79mc 38hr 3min 15sec |
| 87 | 195 | (Australia) Richard Moore | (Australia) Richard Moore (Australia) Phillip Sethna | Volkswagen Beetle | 80mc 28hr 7min 36sec |
| 88 | 113 | (Australia) Malcolm Hall | (Australia) Malcolm Hall (Australia) Ross Smith (Australia) Andrew Lott | Ford Escort Mark II | 85mc 25hr 29min 39sec |
| 89 | 198 | (Australia) Ian Sheridan | (Australia) Terry McTigue (Australia) Ian Sheridan (Australia) Robert Wilson | Holden HQ Panel Van | 87mc 26hr 3min 47sec |
| 90 | 191 | (Australia) Spartan Equipment S/S | (Australia) Norm Sparkes (Australia) Clayton Barry | Ford Fairmont XC | 87mc 28hr 47min 6sec |
| 91 | 188 | (Australia) Peter Webster | (Australia) Peter Webster (Australia) Trevor Jolly (Australia) Rob McIntyre | Holden FJ | 91mc 35hr 40min 5sec |
| 92 | 30 | (Australia) Pacific Ford | (Australia) John Bryson (Australia) Sonja Kable-Cumming | Ford Escort 2.0 Turbo Mark II | 104mc 25hr 44min 36sec |
