= Geard =

Geard is both a given name and a surname. Notable people with the name include:

- Geard Ajetović (born 1981), Serbian boxer
- Leonard Geard (born 1934), English football player
- Rex Geard (1927–1982), Australian Australian rules football player
