= Michael Oaten =

Australian rules footballer

Personal information
- Full name: Michael Oaten
- Born: 20 August 1961 (age 65)
- Height: 188 cm (6 ft 2 in)
- Weight: 76 kg (168 lb)

Playing career^{1}
| Years | Club | Games (Goals) |
| 1980–82 | South Melbourne/Sydney | 6 (8) |
- ^{1} Playing statistics correct to the end of 1982.

Michael Oaten (born 20 August 1961) is a former Australian rules footballer who played with South Melbourne/Sydney in the Victorian Football League (VFL).

Oaten's father Max also played for South Melbourne.
