= Max Oaten =

Australian rules footballer

Personal information
- Full name: Maxwell William Oaten
- Born: 26 January 1934 (age 92)
- Original team: Melton
- Height: 189 cm (6 ft 2 in)
- Weight: 88 kg (194 lb)
- Position: Full-forward

Playing career^{1}
Years	Club	Games (Goals)
1956–1962	South Melbourne	80 (133)
- ^{1} Playing statistics correct to the end of 1962.

Max Oaten (born 26 January 1935) is a former Australian rules footballer who played for South Melbourne in the Victorian Football League (VFL).

== Family ==
He married Cecily Ida Parkes in 1961. Michael Oaten, their son, played briefly at South Melbourne in the early 1980s.

== Football ==
=== South Melbourne (VFL) ===
Max Oaten, a schoolteacher and full-forward from Melton, topped South Melbourne's goal-kicking in 1958 and 1960, with 34 and 39 goals respectively. He kicked his career high six goals in a game on three occasions, including twice in a row to end the 1961 VFL season.

=== VFL ===
On 13 June 1960, playing at centre half-forward, Oaten represented the Victorian Football League, in a match against a combined Tasmania team at York Park, Launceston, Tasmania.

The Victorian team, with (captain, Carlton's Bruce Comben) was outclassed by the Tasmanian team (captain, former Melbourne champion, Stuart Spencer), and lost the match 12.12 (84) to 13.13 (91) (the first-ever VFL loss to a Tasmanian team).

== See also ==
- Tasmania vs Victoria (1960)
