= Car Australia =

Australian automotive magazine

- Categories: Automobile magazine
- Frequency: monthly
- Founded: 1946; 80 years ago
- Country: Australia
- Based in: Sydney
- Language: English

Car Australia was an Australian automotive magazine published monthly until 1994.

== History and profile ==
The magazine was first published in April 1946. Prior to March 1986, the magazine was known as Motor Manual.
