= Rex Geard =

Australian rules footballer

Personal information
- Full name: Rex Geard
- Born: 10 January 1927
- Died: 22 July 1982 (aged 55)
- Original team: Sandy Bay
- Height: 187 cm (6 ft 2 in)
- Weight: 85 kg (187 lb)

Playing career^{1}
Years	Club	Games (Goals)
1952–53	Richmond	11 (0)
- ^{1} Playing statistics correct to the end of 1953.

Rex Geard (10 January 1927 – 22 July 1982) was a former Australian rules footballer who played with Richmond in the Victorian Football League (VFL).
