= Frank Johnson (footballer, born 1936) =

Australian rules footballer

Personal information
- Full name: Frank Edward Johnson
- Nickname: Rooster
- Born: 1 November 1936
- Height: 187 cm (6 ft 2 in)
- Weight: 83 kg (183 lb)

Playing career^{1}
Years	Club	Games (Goals)
1957, 1961–63	South Fremantle	51 (80)
1964	Footscray	6 (4)
1965	Fitzroy	3 (0)
- ^{1} Playing statistics correct to the end of 1965.

Frank Johnson (born 1 November 1936) is a former Australian rules footballer who played with Footscray and Fitzroy in the Victorian Football League (VFL). Before moving to Victoria he played for several seasons with South Fremantle in the West Australian Football League (WAFL).
