= Volkswagen Type 3 =

Compact car built from 1961 to 1973

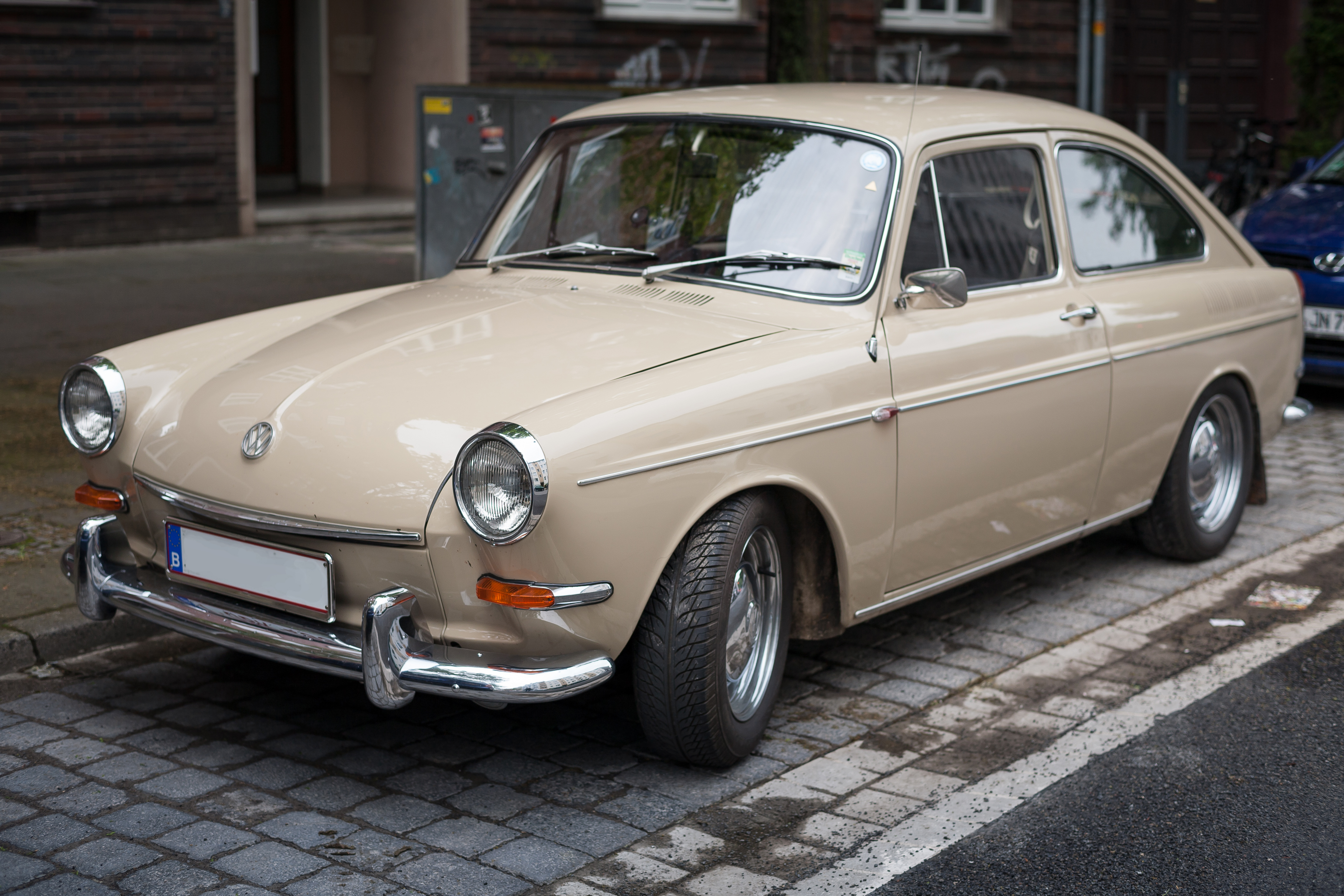
- Volkswagen Type 3 1600 Fastback (1966–69)

Overview
- Manufacturer: Volkswagen
- Also called: Volkswagen 1500; Volkswagen 1600
- Production: 1961–1973; 2,542,382 built
- Assembly: Germany: Wolfsburg/Emden; Brazil: São Bernardo do Campo (VW Brasil); Australia: Clayton; South Africa: Uitenhage

Body and chassis
- Class: Compact (C-segment) family car
- Body style: 2-door Type 31 Notchback; 2-door Type 34 Karmann Ghia; 2-door Type 36 Variant/Squareback; 2-door Type 36 Estate Delivery; 2-door Type 31 Fastback; 4-door Notchback and Fastback sedans (Brazil)
- Layout: Rear engine rear wheel drive
- Related: Volkswagen Beetle; VW Karmann Ghia Type 34; Karmann Ghia TC (VW do Brasil); Volkswagen SP2 (VW do Brasil)

Powertrain
- Engine: 1.5 or 1.6L H4
- Transmission: 4-speed manual; 3-speed fully automatic

Dimensions
- Wheelbase: 2,400 mm (94.5 in)
- Length: 4,225 mm (166.3 in)
- Width: 1,605 mm (63.2 in)
- Height: 1,475 mm (58.1 in)
- Curb weight: 880 kg (1,940 lb)

Chronology
- Predecessor: Volkswagen Beetle (due to engine type and model purpose)
- Successor: Volkswagen Passat (B1)

The Volkswagen Type 3 is a compact car manufactured and marketed by Volkswagen from 1961 to 1973. Introduced at the 1961 Frankfurt International Motor Show, the IAA, the Type 3 was marketed as the Volkswagen 1500 and later as the Volkswagen 1600, in two-door notchback, fastback, and station wagon body styles, the latter marketed as the Squareback in the United States.

The Type 3 diversified Volkswagen's product range beyond the existing models—the Type 1 Beetle, Type 14 Karmann Ghia, and Type 2 vans and pickups—while retaining Volkswagen's hallmark engineering features: the air-cooled rear-engine, rear-wheel drive train, body-on-chassis construction (with a backbone chassis integrated into the car's floorpan), as well as torsion bar front and rear suspension.

Despite using the Beetle's 2.40 m (94 in) wheelbase, the Type 3 was conceived as a larger car, offering a larger engine and increased cargo and passenger volume—the latter from its increased length and width as well as from its slab-sided Ponton styling, maximising the platform's footprint.

== Background ==
The Type 3 emulated major features of the Type 1 Beetle, using a low-profile version of Volkswagen's rear-engined, four-cylinder air-cooled engine, as well as body-on-chassis construction (the body bolts to a frame that includes the floor pan), retaining the same wheelbase while using more contemporary, slab-sided Ponton styling, in contrast to the Type 1's articulated fenders and running boards. VW finalized the design by 1959, with prototypes ready for testing by 1960. Secrecy was so tight that VW denied they were preparing a new design at the 1960 Geneva Auto Show. In 1961, VW announced the new line as the "VW 1500".

Production began in August 1961, a month before launch, of the Volkswagen 1500 Notchback, encompassing three-box styling in a Notchback saloon body. Production of the Karmann Ghia 1500 (also known as the Type 34 Karmann Ghia) with a coupé body commenced in November 1961, and deliveries started in January 1962. The station wagon/estate-bodied Variant (marketed as the Squareback in the US) followed, with the first cars produced in February 1962. Twelve prototype convertibles based on the 1500 Notchback were also built, but never entered production.

The Fastback, or TL version, a fastback coupé, arrived in August 1965, along with the 1600 engine. Volkswagen's intention was that this model should replace the Notchback, which is what happened in the UK market. However, in other markets, including the German domestic market, the number of customers preferring the older Notchback shaped car was higher than foreseen; both the Notchback and Fastback ultimately remained in production until July 1973. Type 3s were made in a variety of trim levels with different features for different markets. Top end models featured more chrome, more bright trim, and full carpeting, and were available with a fully automatic transmission starting in mid-1968. Factory-installed gasoline powered heaters were an option available in some markets. Air conditioning and radios were never factory-installed, but were often available as dealer-installed options.

Volkswagen of America began marketing the Type 3 Squarebacks and Fastbacks for the 1966 model year, but never imported the Notchback or Type 34 Karmann Ghia. The Type 3 competed in the market with the Chevrolet Corvair that had been previously introduced in the United States in 1960, which incorporated a six-cylinder, rear-mounted air-cooled engine in notchback and station wagon body style, as well as a compact van and pickup derived from the platform. It also competed in the US with the Renault 8, which also offered a rear engine and rear drive sedan.

A unique feature of all four Type 3 models was that configuration of the flat 4 engine gave the cars both front and rear luggage volumes, a fact highlighted in VW's advertising.

For the 1968 model year, the Type 3 1600E (Einspritzung) models were the first mass-produced automobiles with electronic fuel injection available as optional equipment. This marked the introduction of the Bosch D-Jetronic fuel injection, which was available only in VW Type 3s for its first two years. The 1600 cc D-Jetronic fuel injection engine was standard equipment for all Type 3s sold in the US for model years 1968 to 1973, but single and dual carb engines remained as available options for many markets around the world until the end of Type 3 production.

In mid-1968, a three-speed, fully automatic transaxle became available. With the automatic came a CV-jointed independent rear suspension (IRS), replacing the swing axle (also IRS) set-up. This was only available in conjunction with the dual carb 1600 cc Type 3 engine. For 1969, the CV-jointed rear axle became standard with both automatic and manual transmissions, and the automatic transmission was also offered combined with the D-Jetronic 1600 cc fuel injection engine. The swing axle rear suspension remained available for some markets that had poorer quality roads.

Type 3 models received a facelift in 1970, with a revised front end, its nose extended by 115 mm (4.5 in) adding 1.5 cu ft (42 L) to the luggage capacity. At the same time, Type 3s received revised square-section bumpers (with integral rubber strips in some markets), as well as larger tail lamps and front indicators.

Volkswagen offered the Type 3 in a lower trim level in Europe, marketed as the 1600A. In the US, and for 1973 only, Volkswagen offered two trim levels of the Type 3 Fastback, marketed as the Type 3 Sedan and Type 3 Basic Compact. The Basic Compact trim level featured reduced content, including limited color and upholstery availability; deletion of exterior belt line chrome trim, clock, and electric-heated rear window defogger; and using painted vent window frames, a black cardboard front trunk liner over the gas tank without a liner on the sides of the trunk or over the firewall, and plain vinyl door panels without door pockets and rubber mats in lieu of interior carpet.

While the Type 3 was a more modern design, it never reached the same level of popularity as the Beetle. As Volkswagen started to produce front-wheel drive water-cooled designs, production on the Type 3 ended in 1973 at the Wolfsburg plant. The Wolfsburg production facilities were then retooled to build the Golf, known as the Rabbit in the US, which eventually replaced the Type 1 as Volkswagen's best-selling sedan. Production of the Type 3 moved to VW's new Emden plant, which was retooled later in 1973 to build the first-generation Passat (also marketed as the Dasher).

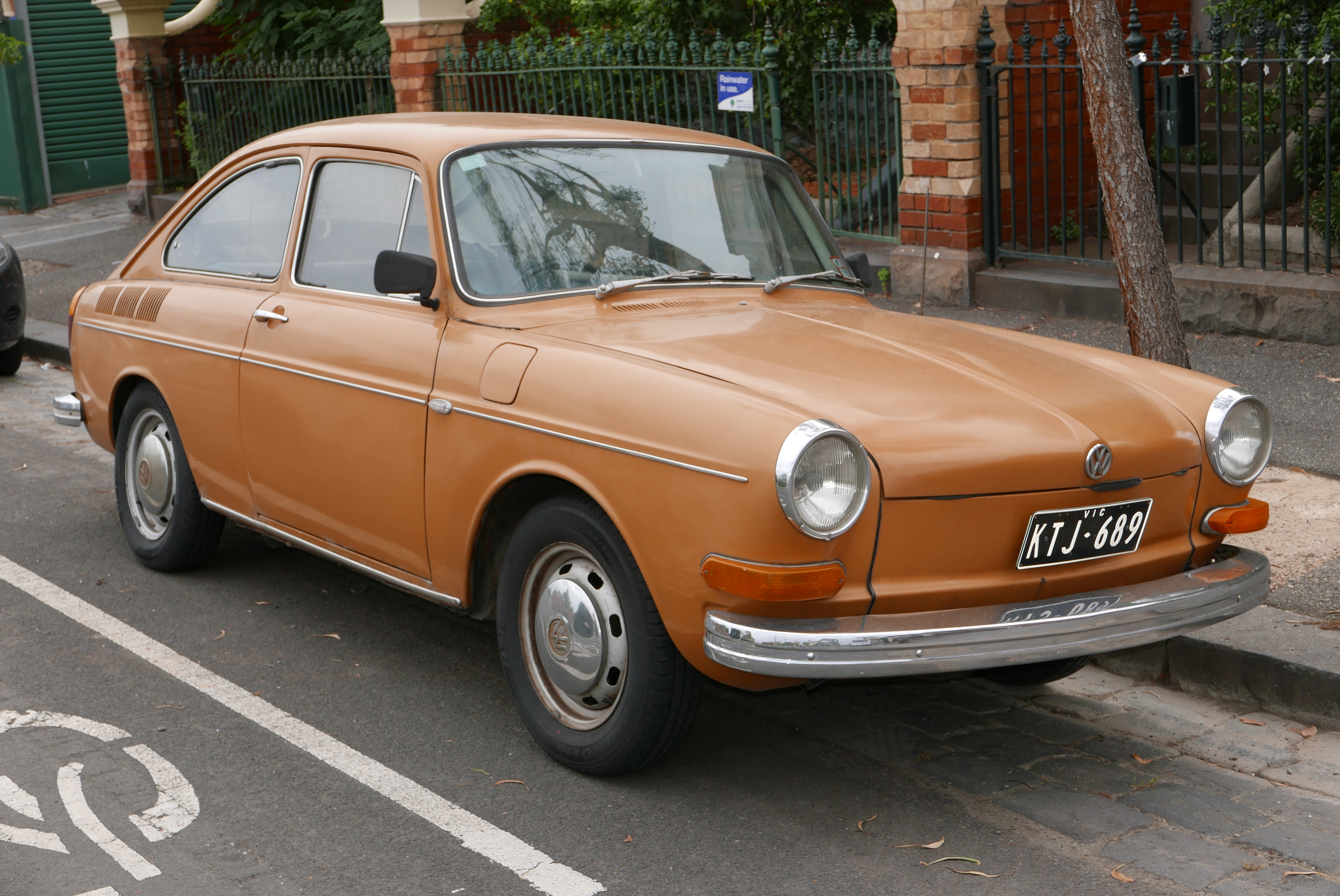
Volkswagen 1600 TL Fastback

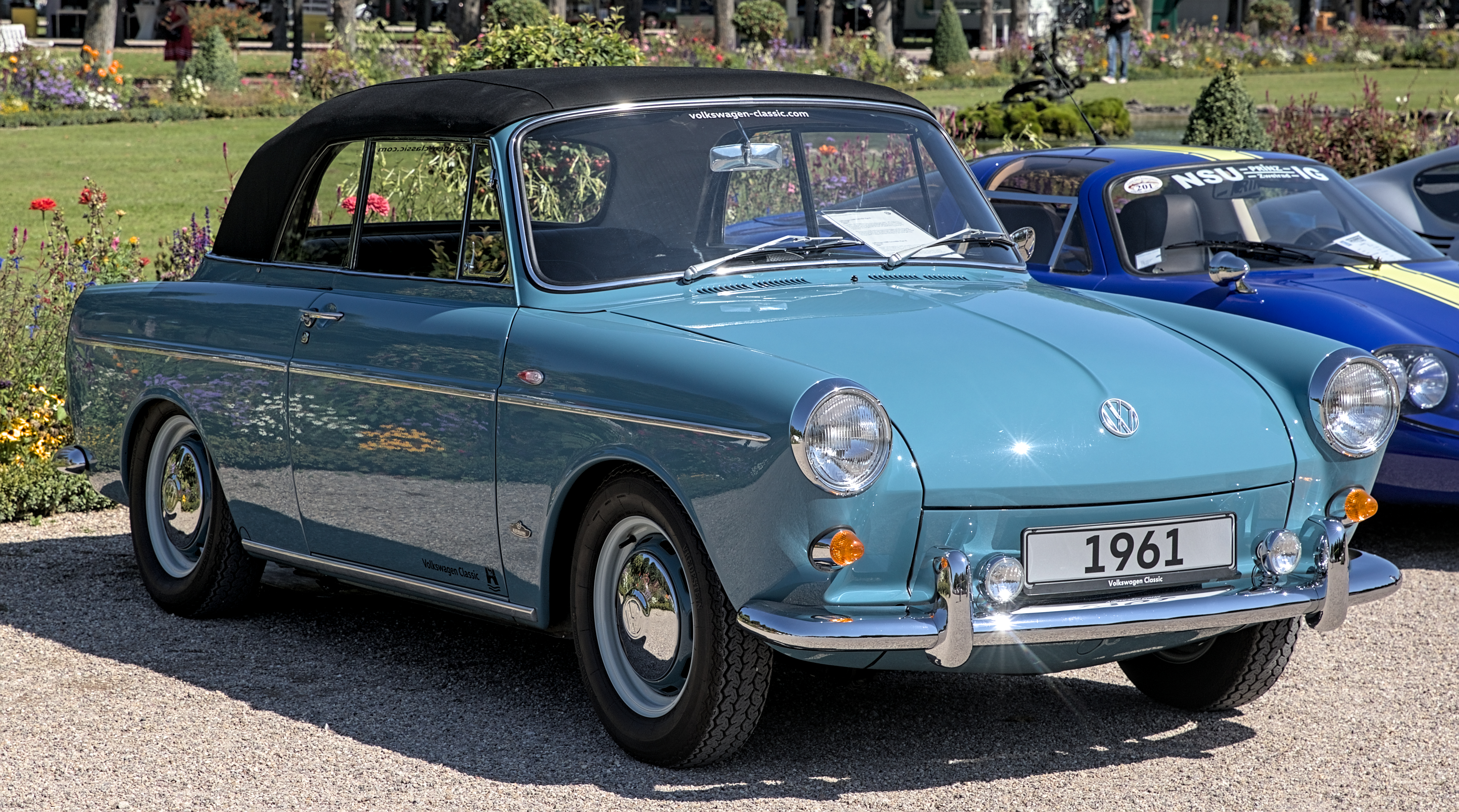
1961 convertible prototype

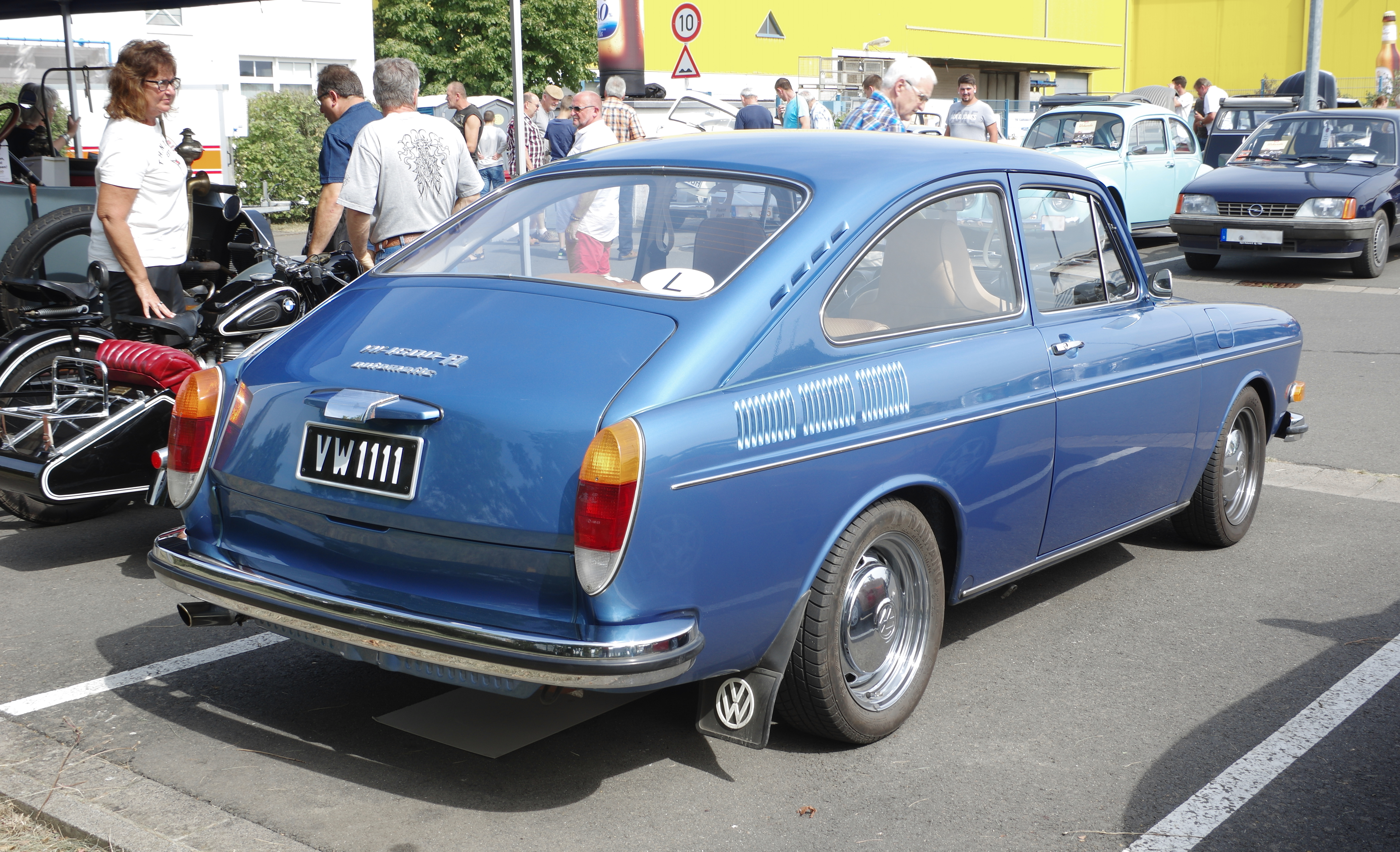
1600 Fastback

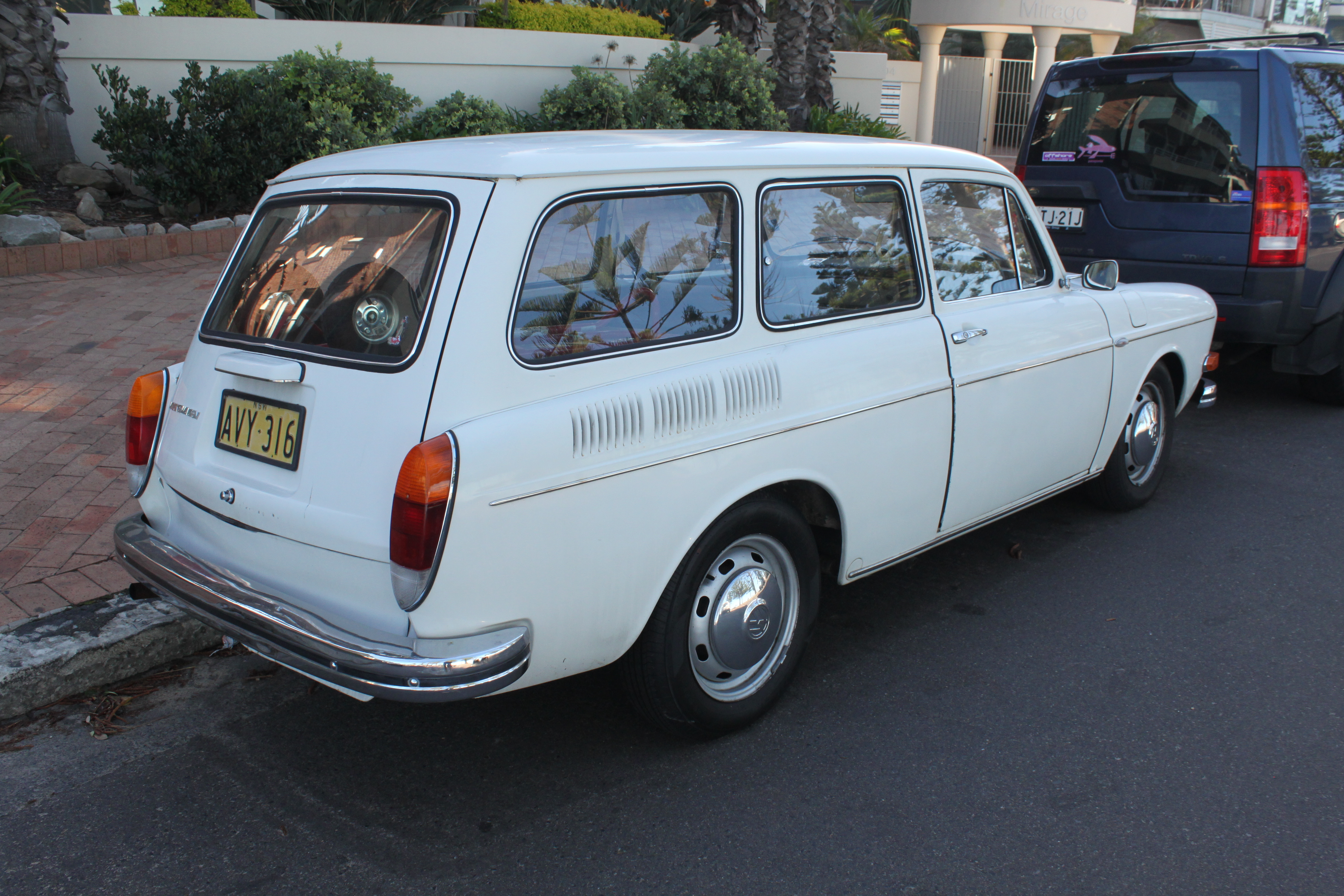
1600 Variant/Squareback

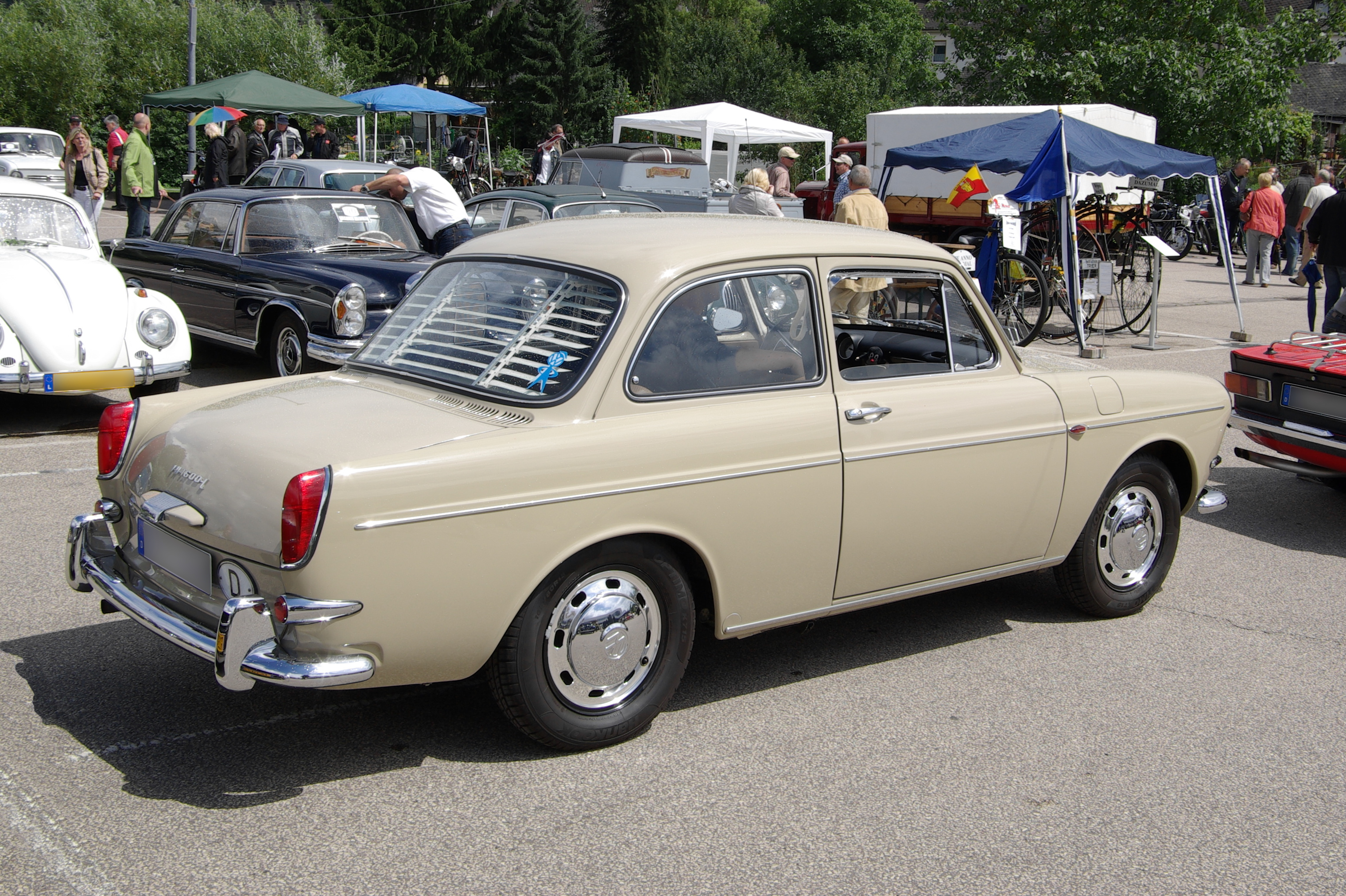
1500 Notchback

== Engine and drivetrain ==
The Type 3 was initially equipped with a 1.5 L (1493 cc) engine based on the air-cooled 1192 cc flat-4 found in the Type 1, but given a 69 mm stroke, it became the basis for the 1300 cc, 1500 cc and 1600 cc engines that followed in the later Beetle (Type 1) and Volkswagen Type 2 T1 and T2. While the long block remained the same as the Type 1, the engine cooling was redesigned by putting the fan on the end of the crankshaft instead of on the generator. This reduced the height of the engine profile, allowing greater cargo volume and earning its nicknames: the pancake or suitcase engine. 1600 cc (1584 cc) engine options became available starting in the 1966 model year, but the 1500 cc options remained available through the end of Type 3 production. Both displacements were available in low and high compression versions, so there were low and high compression single and dual carb engines. The D-Jetronic fuel injection engine was only made in the high compression configuration.

Starting with the 1966 model year, Type 3 engine numbers came with a letter prefix that indicated the engine type. For 1500 cc (all single carb) engines, the low compression prefix was M, while the high compression prefix was K. For the 1600 cc (all dual carb) engines, the low compression prefix was P, and the high compression prefix was T. Fuel injected engines have a U (or X for 1972–73 California cars).

The Type 3 used a similar transmission to the Beetle, but with higher ratios (4.125 R&P v 4.375 R&P) and longer axles. Unlike the Beetle (Type 1), the Type 3 engine and transmission unit was mounted into a subframe (which contained the complete rear suspension), which was then rubber-mounted to the floorpan and body, thereby isolating vibration and road noise from the passenger space.

The original Volkswagen 1500 used a single side-draught 32 mm Solex PHN carburetor. In August 1963, VW introduced two carburetor versions: the Volkswagen 1500 N ("Normal"), rated at 45 PS (33 kW; 44 hp), and the 1500 S ("Super"), 54 PS (40 kW; 53 hp) which had high-compression (8.5:1) domed 83 mm pistons and twin downdraught 32 mm Solex PDSIT carburetors for more power.

1600 cc Type 3 engine options were added in August 1965. In 1968, the 1600 cc Type 3 became the world's first volume production car to feature electronic fuel injection – designed by Bosch. The Bosch D-Jetronic system was offered on the Volkswagen 1600 TE and LE version ("E" designating "Einspritzung" or "injection" in German). A similar Bosch D-Jetronic injection system was used in the later VW Type 4, and some models of the VW-Porsche 914/4. In mid-1968, a fully automatic, three-speed transmission was introduced, installed together with the dual carb engine. This automatic transmission was offered together with the fuel injected engine starting with the 1969 model year.

A notable advance from the Type 1 to the Type 3 was the front suspension. Although similar to the Type 1, it was the first Volkswagen front suspension to incorporate transverse round torsion bars, as opposed to the Type 1's torsion leaves. The Type 3's torsion bars are cross-mounted in the lower tube, so that each individual torsion bar spans the full width of the car, the upper tube containing an anti-roll bar that connects the upper trailing links to each other. The complete front suspension unit is rubber-mounted to the car's floorpan. In 1969, the rear suspension was upgraded to double jointed CV joint semi trailing arm suspension (sometimes called "IRS" by VW enthusiasts to differentiate it from the previous IRS swing-axle type).

The Type 3 offered both front and rear enclosed luggage areas, with cargo accessible via both the boot (trunk) and the bonnet (hood). In each of the four body styles (Notchback, Squareback, Fastback, and Ghia), the engine is located under and accessed by a panel on the floor of the rear cargo area. This engine placement was highlighted in a 1966 Volkswagen television commercial for the American market. It featured a young Dustin Hoffman, who shows the fastback model and explains its technical features, but is unable to locate the engine. The ad closed with the copy, "Come into your Volkswagen dealer. They'll show you where the motor is."

The original Type 3 with five-bolt wheels (5 × 205 mm PCD) used twin leading shoe drum brakes at the front. In August 1965 (the 1966 model year), these were replaced by front disc brakes, coinciding with the introduction of the Fastback and 1600 engine (Australian-built models retained drum front brakes until August 1967). These have four-bolt wheels (4 × 130 mm PCD) with eight cooling slots. Rear brakes were always leading/trailing shoe drums.

== Technical data ==
	Variant (December 1969)		
Engine		Dimensions	
Model	VW flat four (four-stroke)	Length	4,340 mm (170.9 in)
Operational principle	Otto	Width	1,605 mm (63.2 in)
Fuel system	Carburettor Solex 32 PHN	Height	1,470 mm (57.9 in)
Bore × Stroke	83 mm × 69 mm (3.3 in × 2.7 in)	Wheelbase	2,400 mm (94.5 in)
Displacement	1,493 cm^{3} (91.1 in^{3})	Ground clearance	150 mm (5.9 in)
Rated power	45 PS (33.1 kW) at 3800 min^{−1}	Kerb weight	1,080 kg (2,381.0 lb)
Max. torque	10.8 kp⋅m (106 N⋅m) at 2000 min^{−1}	Max weight	1,485 kg (3,273.9 lb)
Mean effective pressure	9.1 kp/cm^{2} (8.9 bar) at 2000 min^{−1}	Turning circle	11,100 mm (437.0 in)
Max. piston speed	8.74 m/s at 3800 min^{−1}	Road performance	
Compression ratio	7.5:1	Max. speed	125 km/h (77.7 mph)
Min. fuel consumption	225 g/PSh (305.9 g/kWh) at 2600 min^{−1}	Rated fuel consumption (DIN 70030)	8.4 L/100 km (33.6 mpg_{‑imp}) at 1980 min^{−1}
Mass	124.5 kg (274.5 lb)	Rated oil consumption (DIN 70030)	0.05–0.1 L/100 km (5,650–2,825 mpg_{‑imp}) at 1980 min^{−1}

== Production figures ==
German production:

- 1500/1600 chassis and works prototypes: 311
- Type 351 1500/1600 Convertible (prototypes): 12
- Type 31 1500/1600 Notchback/Fastback: 1,339,124
- Type 36 1500/1600 Variant: 1,202,935

Brazilian production:

- Notchback: 24,475
- Fastback: 109,515
- Variant: 256,760
- Variant II: 41,002

=== Australian production ===
The Type 3 was manufactured at Clayton in Victoria, Australia, beginning in 1963 in sedan, station wagon and sedan delivery body styles. In 1965, the Fastback was introduced, fully imported from Germany.

Panel van versions (based on the 1500 "N") feature a marine ply wood loading area with zinc-plated steel protector strips, one sun visor (for the driver), a clock delete panel, and no fixed side windows. All Australian-assembled panel vans were fitted with a metal ID tag behind the spare wheel with a prefix of "PV", followed by the number, stamped by hand. There are approximately 10 known surviving panel vans from the estimated original production run of 500, and a further 10 to 15 from German manufacture.

Following the cessation of all local manufacturing by Volkswagen Australasia in 1968, the Type 3 was assembled from CKD kits by Motor Producers Limited at the same Clayton facility until 1973.

== Related models ==
=== Type 34 Karmann Ghia ===
In 1961, Volkswagen introduced the 1500 Karmann Ghia, or Type 34, based on its new Type 3 platform, featuring a new flat 1500 cc engine design, and styling by Italian engineer Sergio Sartorelli at Carrozzeria Ghia. Until it was replaced by the VW-Porsche 914, it was the most expensive and most luxurious passenger car VW manufactured in the 1960s. 42,505 (plus 17 prototype convertibles) were manufactured from 1962 to 1969. Although the Type 34 was available in most countries, it was not offered officially in the US, VW's largest and most important export market.

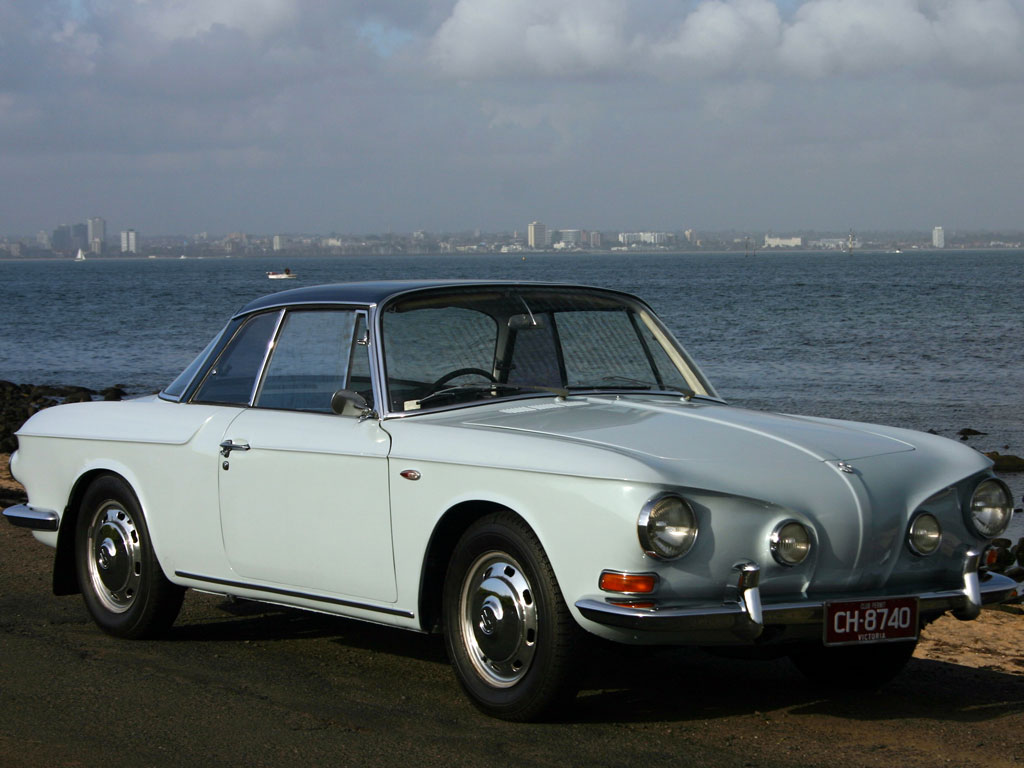
Australian-market Type 34

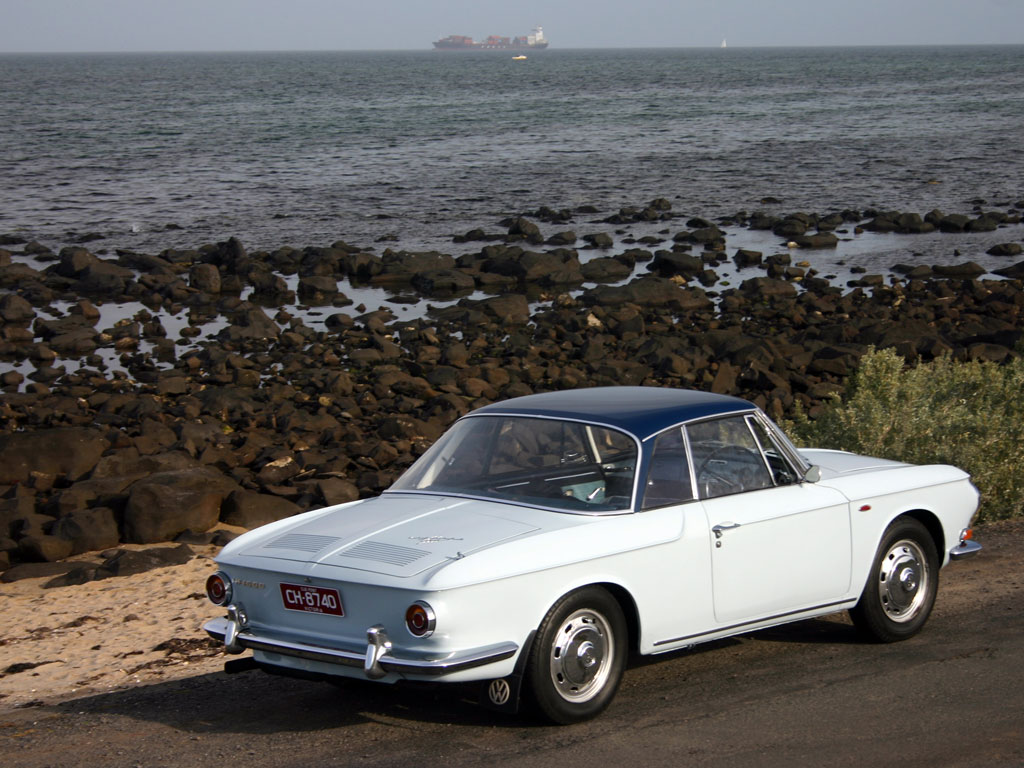
Rear end

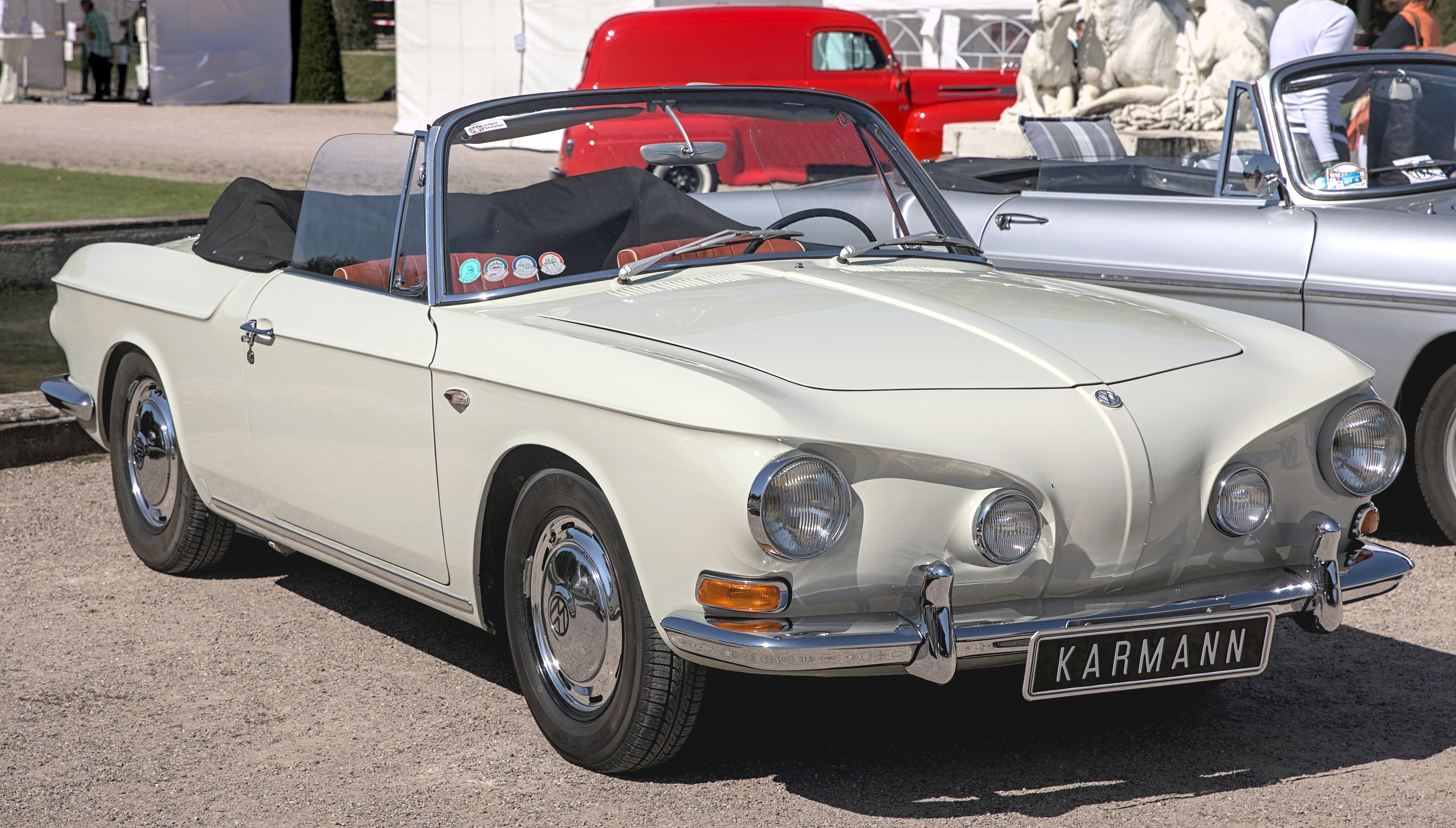
Convertible - prototype

=== Brazilian Type 3 ===
The three-box Type 3 was launched in Brazil in 1968. It was heavily based on Volkswagen's EA 97 prototype of 1960, with some restyling penned by Márcio Piancastelli and four doors. It met with little success, and was nicknamed Zé do Caixão (meaning "Coffin Joe", after a popular Brazilian horror filmmaker) for its boxy shape. It was discontinued in 1970.

The fastback version, the Volkswagen TL, fared somewhat better, remaining in production from 1970 to 1976, originally as a two-door and later as a four-door version.

As in Germany, the original Karmann Ghia was replaced with the Type 3-based Karmann Ghia TC (Touring Coupé), but with a distinct look from the German Karmann Ghia Type 34.

Neither enjoyed as much success as its estate-bodied sibling, the Variant. The three-door Variant was produced from 1969 to 1977, followed by the Variant II, an updated successor with squarer body (similar to the Brasilia) which was produced from 1977 to 1981.

Brazilian Type 3s used the front suspension from the Type 1 with its laminated half-width torsion bars in top and bottom tubes and solidly mounted to the floorpan, unlike the German Type 3's rubber mounted unit with full-width crossed round bars in the lower tube and anti-roll bar in the top one. The only exception among the Brazilian Type 3s was the Variant II, which was equipped with a front MacPherson strut.

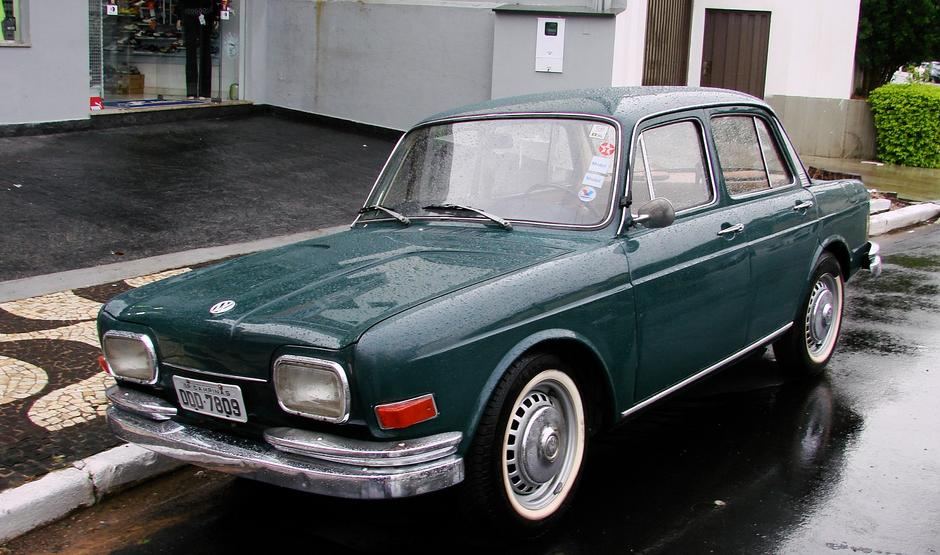
1969 Brazilian Volkswagen 1600 notchback, 4 door

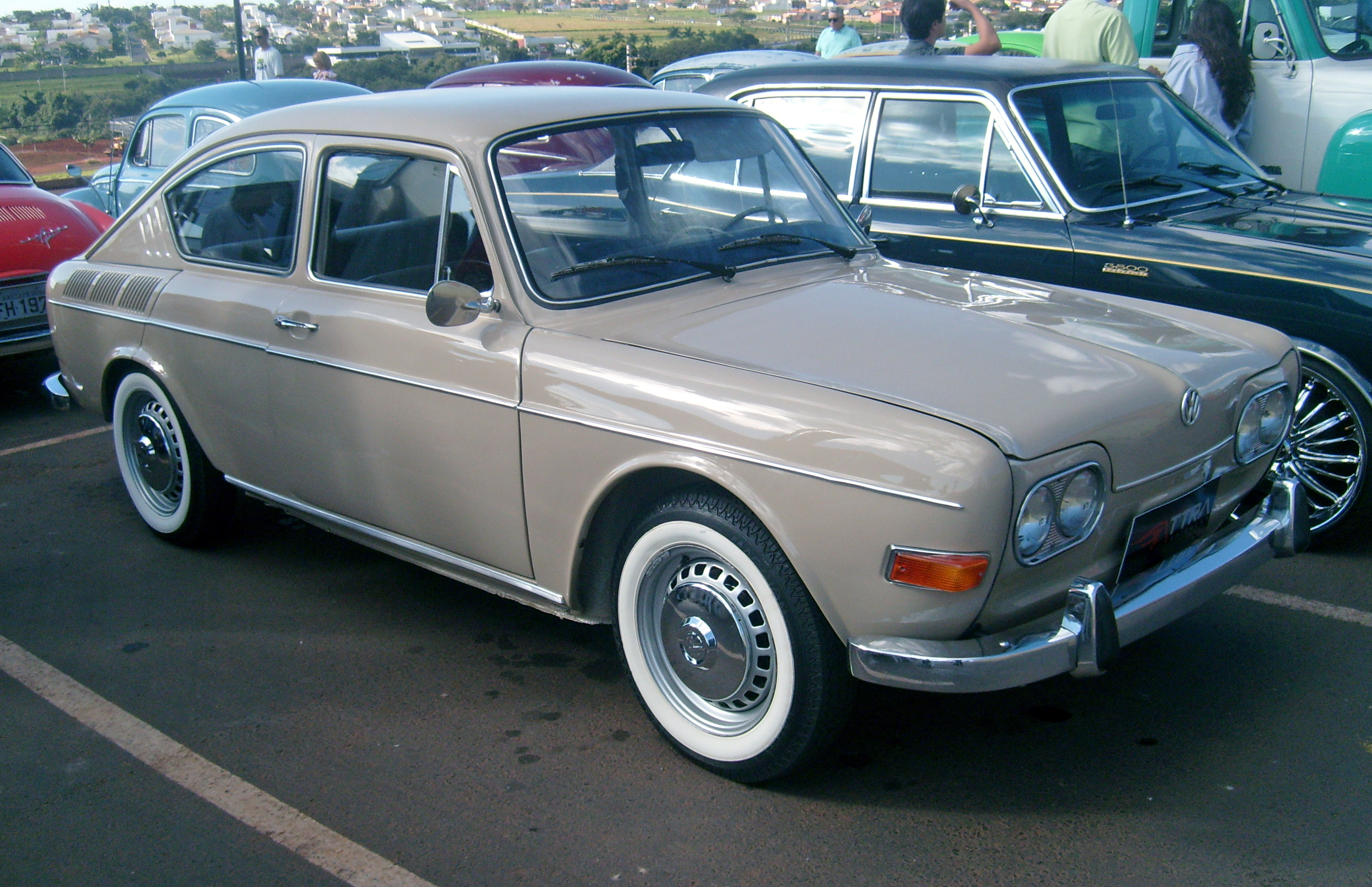
Brazilian Volkswagen 1600 TL fastback

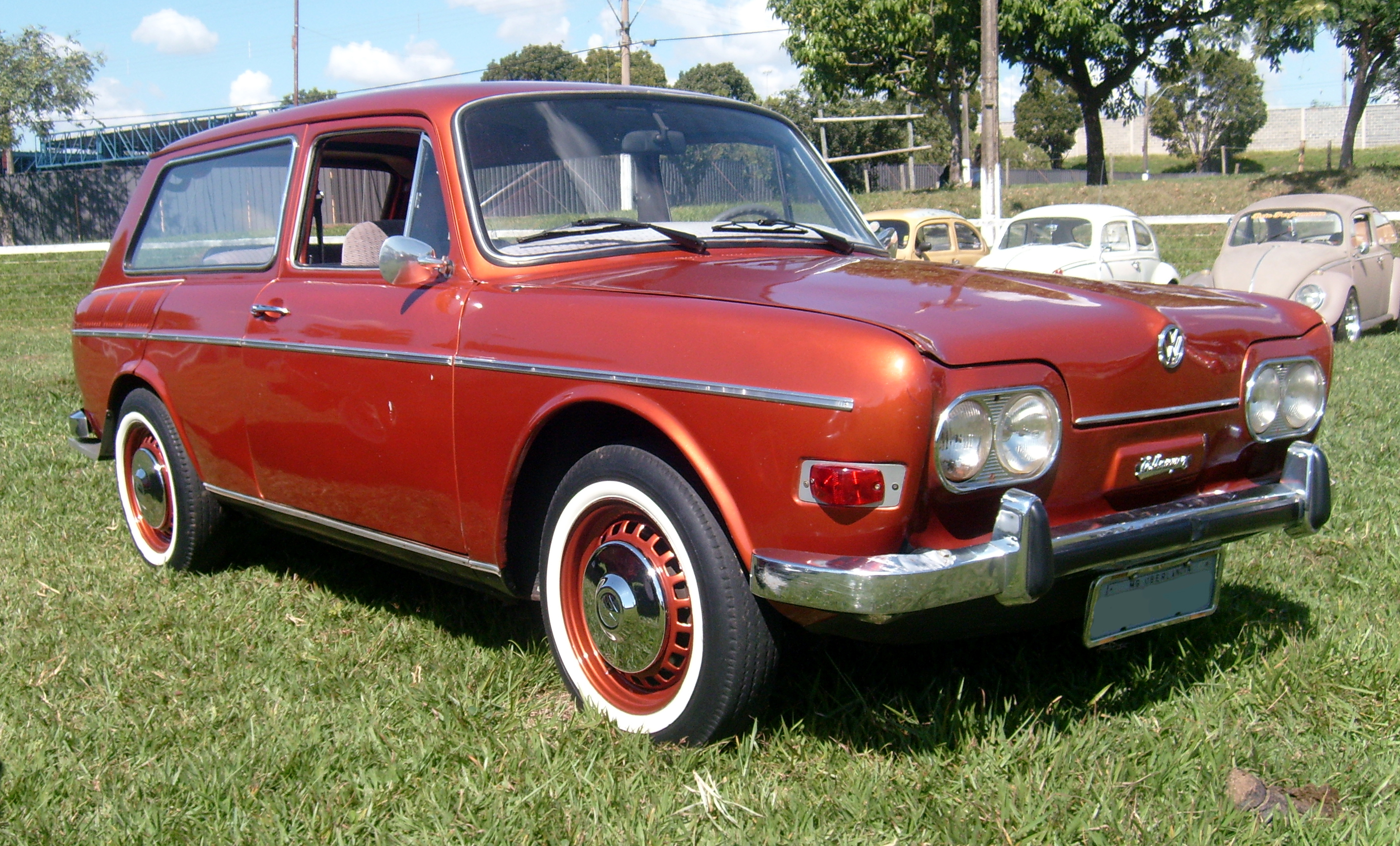
Brazilian Volkswagen 1600 Variant

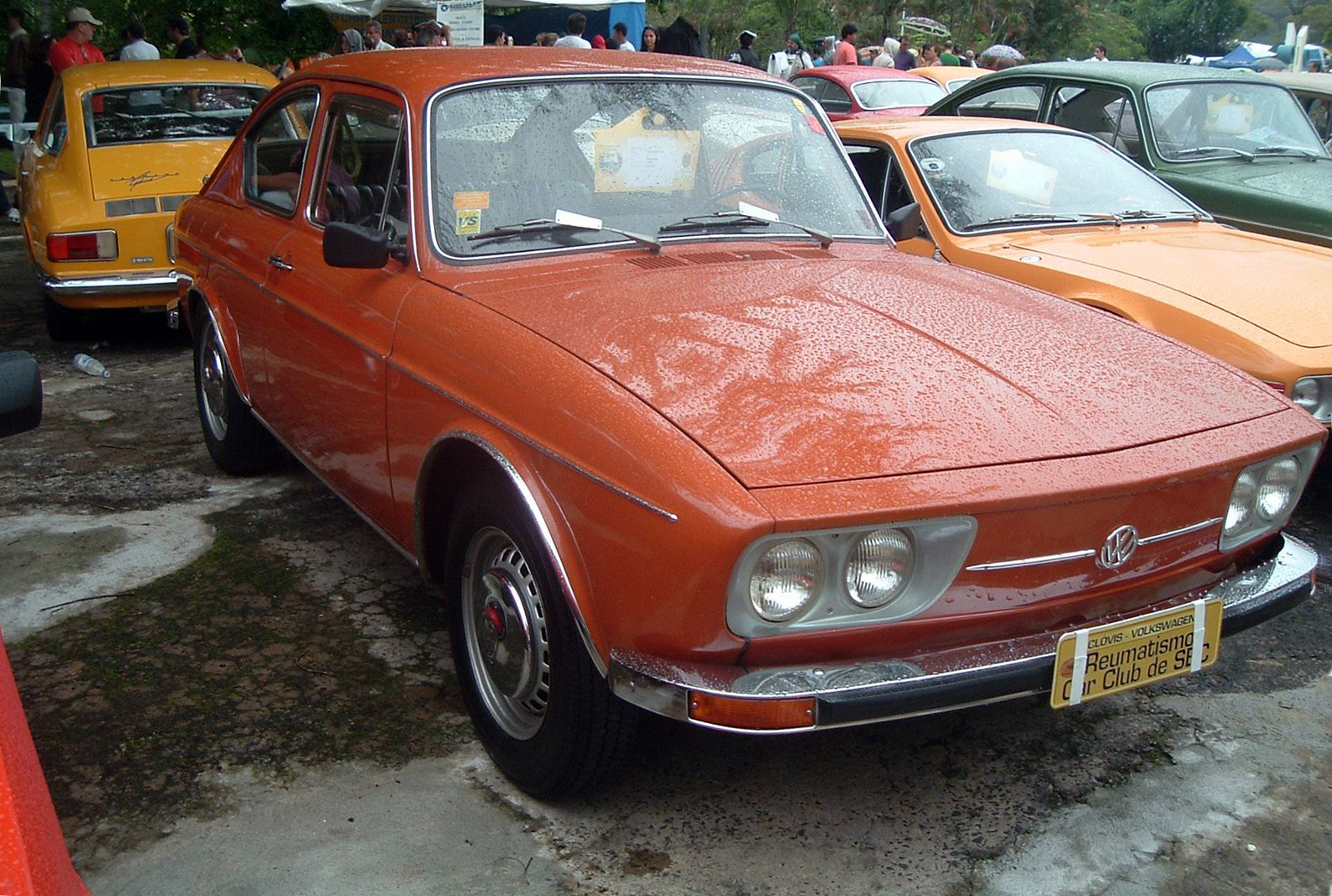
Brazilian Volkswagen 1600 TL fastback (new front)

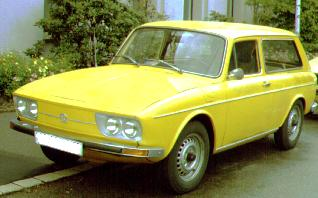
Brazilian Volkswagen Variant (new front)

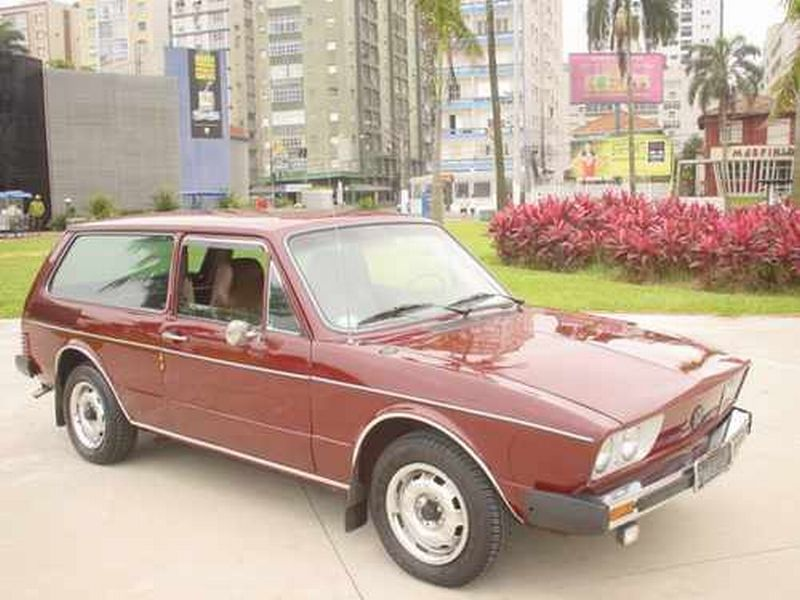
Brazilian Volkswagen Variant II

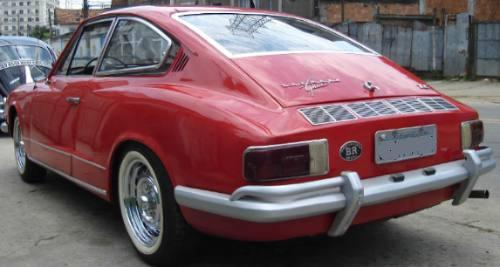
Brazilian Karmann-Ghia TC

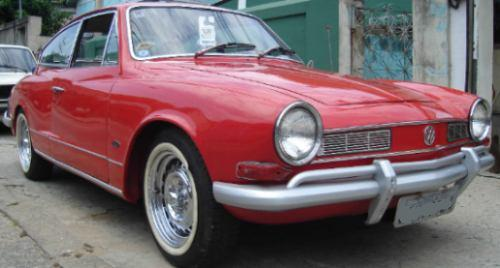
Brazilian Karmann-Ghia TC

== Argentinian Dodge 1500-based Volkswagen 1500 ==
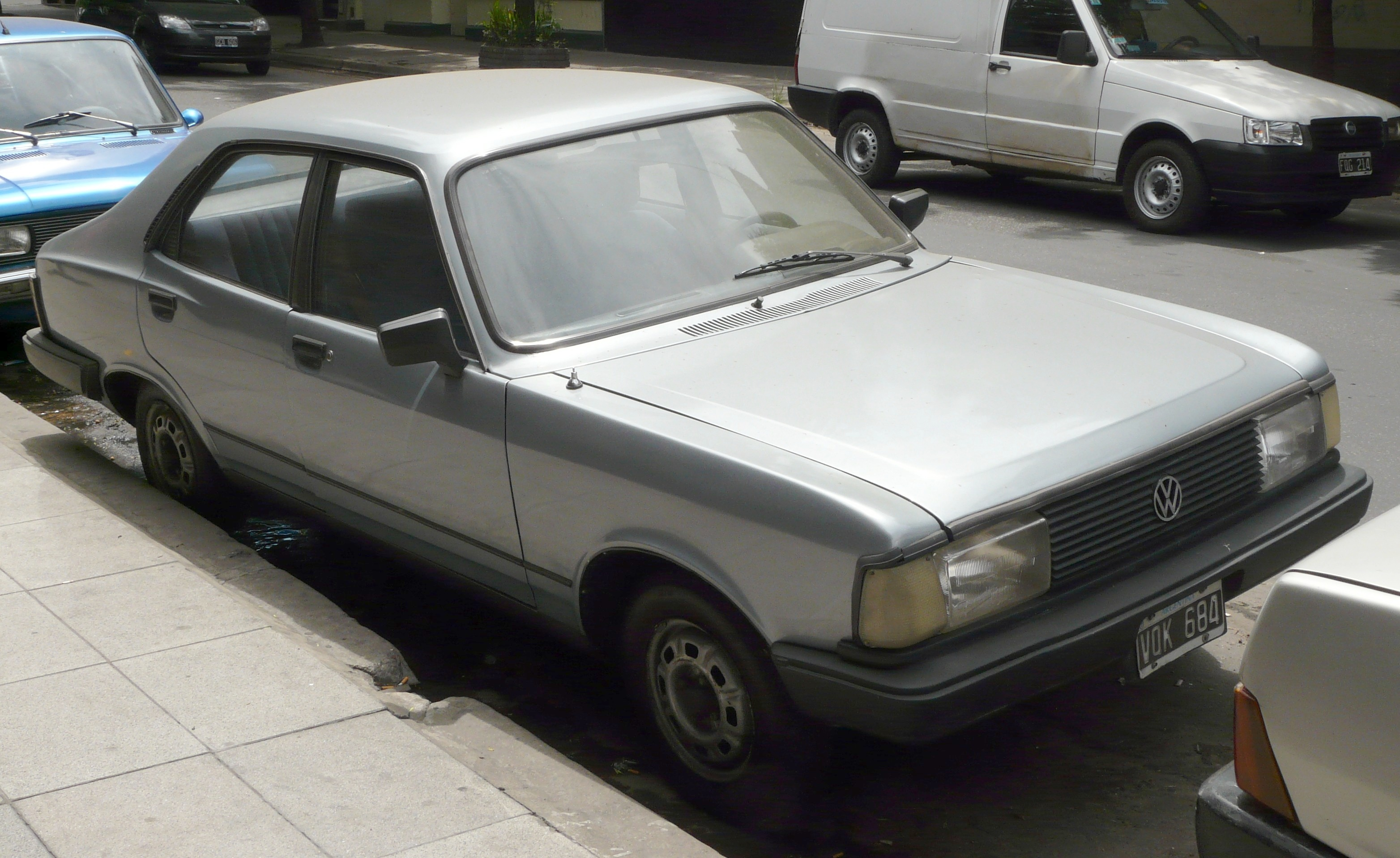
Argentinian Volkswagen 1500

A "Volkswagen 1500" unrelated to the Type 3 model 1500 was sold during the 1980s in Argentina, based upon the Dodge 1500 manufactured in that country.

In 1980, Volkswagen bought the Argentinian company Chrysler Fevre Argentina SAIC, inheriting some Dodge and Chrysler models and renaming the company Volkswagen Argentina SA. One of the models was the Dodge 1500 (also the Dodge 1800), which the newly taken-over company rebadged as the Volkswagen 1500 for the Argentinian market. The estate was known as the Volkswagen 1500 Rural. Both variants continued to be sold until 1988.

The car, which was based on the Hillman Avenger, had also been sold in Brazil, where it was known as the Dodge Polara. This version was discontinued in 1981, shortly after Volkswagen's purchase of the tooling in Argentina. The same car was available in North America earlier in the 1970s as the Plymouth Cricket.

No parts of the Dodge 1500/Volkswagen 1500 overlap with the Volkswagen Type 3 model 1500, or any other Volkswagen product. Furthermore, the 1500 is the only front-engine, rear-wheel drive passenger car line ever sold as a Volkswagen.
