= Porsche =

German automobile manufacturer

Dr. Ing. h.c. F. Porsche AG

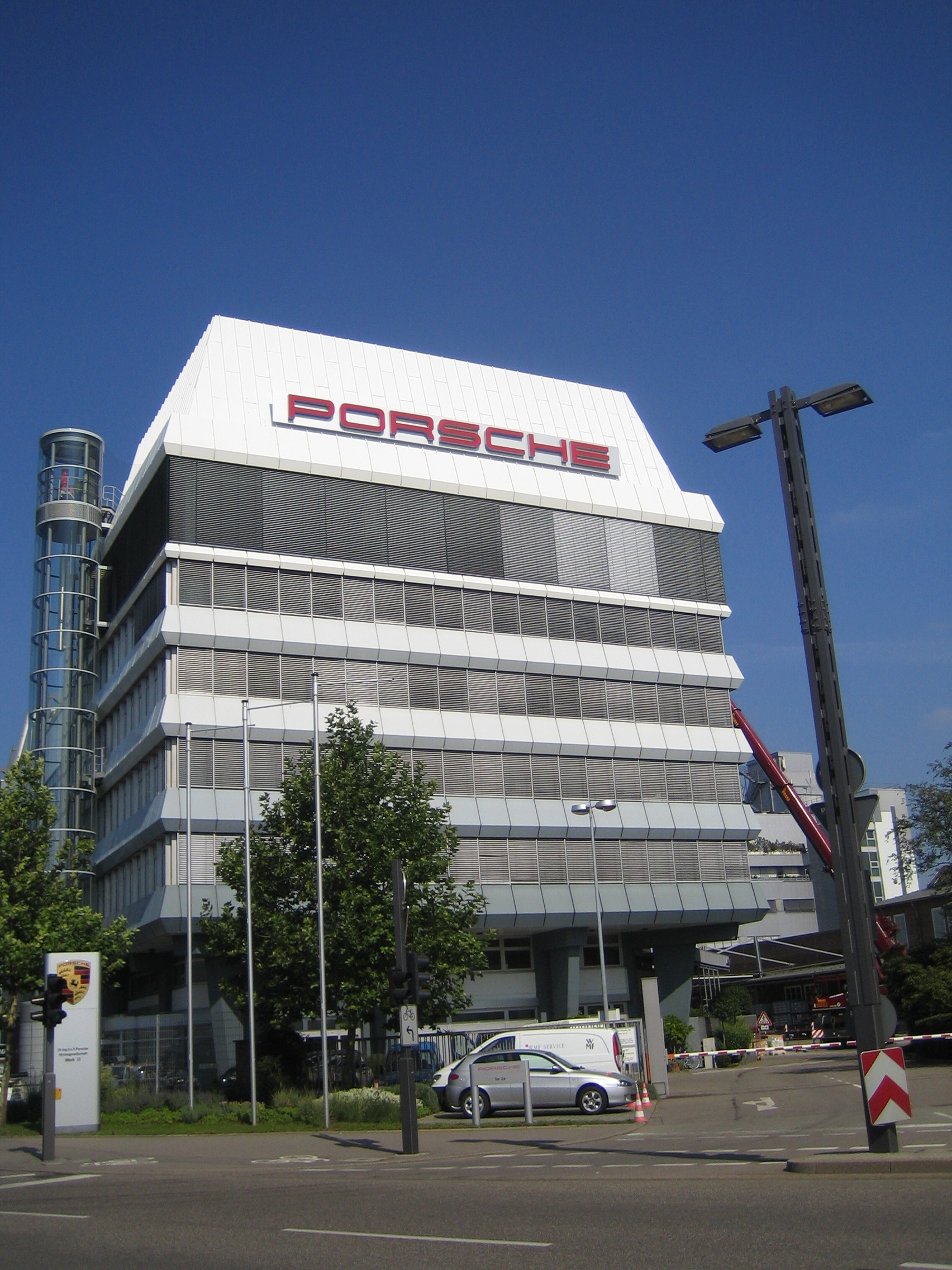
- Headquarters in Stuttgart
- Type: Public (Aktiengesellschaft)
- Traded as: FWB: P911; DAX component
- ISIN: DE000PAG9113
- Industry: Automotive
- Founded: 1931; 95 years ago in Stuttgart, Germany
- Founders: Ferdinand Porsche; Anton Piëch; Adolf Rosenberger
- Headquarters: Stuttgart, Germany
- Area served: Worldwide
- Key people: Wolfgang Porsche (chairman); Michael Leiters (CEO)
- Products: Automobiles
- Production output: ▼279,449 vehicles (2025)
- Services: Automotive financial services, engineering services, investment management
- Revenue: ▼€36.272 billion (2025)
- Operating income: ▼€413 million (2025)
- Net income: ▼€1.006 billion (2025)
- Total assets: ▼€52.715 billion (2025)
- Total equity: ▲€23.121 billion (2025)
- Owners: Volkswagen AG (75.4%); Porsche SE (12.5%); QIA (2.5%)
- Number of employees: 42,615 (2024)
- Subsidiaries: Porsche Design; Porsche Engineering; MHP Management- und IT-Beratung
- Website: www.porsche.com

Dr. Ing. h.c. F. Porsche AG, commonly known as Porsche, (Note: German pronunciation: [ˈpɔʁʃə] ; see below) is a German automobile manufacturer specializing in luxury, high-performance sports cars, SUVs and sedans, headquartered in Stuttgart, Baden-Württemberg, Germany. The company is owned by Volkswagen AG, a controlling stake of which is owned by Porsche Automobil Holding SE, usually shortened to Porsche SE. Porsche's current lineup includes the 911, Boxster/Cayman, Panamera, Macan, Cayenne, and Taycan.

The origins of the company date to the 1931, when German Bohemian automotive engineer Ferdinand Porsche founded Porsche with Adolf Rosenberger, a key figure in the creation of German automotive manufacturer and Audi precursor Auto Union, and Austrian businessman Anton Piëch, who was, at the time, also Ferdinand Porsche's son in law. In its early days, it was contracted by the German government to create a vehicle for the masses, which later became the Volkswagen Beetle. After World War II, when Ferdinand, a member of both the Nazi Party and the SS, would be arrested for war crimes, his son Ferry Porsche, an SS volunteer, began building his own car, which would result in the Porsche 356.

In 2009, Porsche entered an agreement with Volkswagen to create an "integrated working group" by merging the two companies' car manufacturing operations. By 2015, Porsche SE, the holding company spun off from the original Porsche firm, had a controlling interest in the Volkswagen Group, which included Audi and Lamborghini as subsidiaries.

== History ==
=== Origin ===
Ferdinand Porsche founded Dr. Ing. h. c. F. Porsche GmbH with Adolf Rosenberger and Anton Piëch in 1931. The name is short for Ferdinand Porsche's full title in German, Doktor-Ingenieur honoris causa (lit. 'Doctor of Engineering, Honorary Degree'). The main offices were at Kronenstraße 24 in the centre of Stuttgart. Initially, the company offered motor vehicle development work and consulting, but did not build any cars under its own name. One of the first assignments the new company received was from the German government to design a car for the people; that is, a Volkswagen. This resulted in the Volkswagen Beetle, one of the most successful car designs of all time. Later, the Porsche 64 would be developed in 1939, using many components from the Beetle.

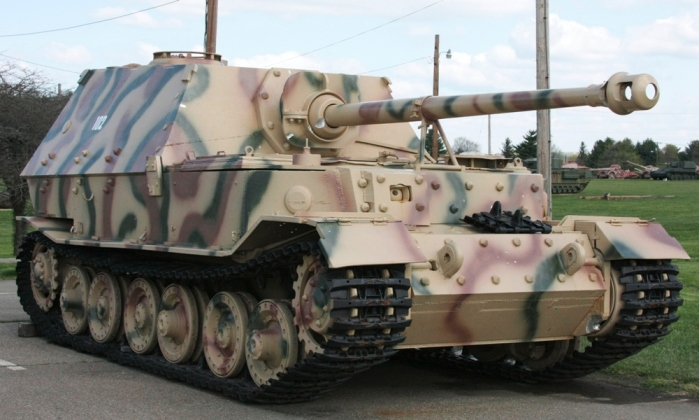
Panzerjäger Elefant – a tank destroyer also known as "Ferdinand"

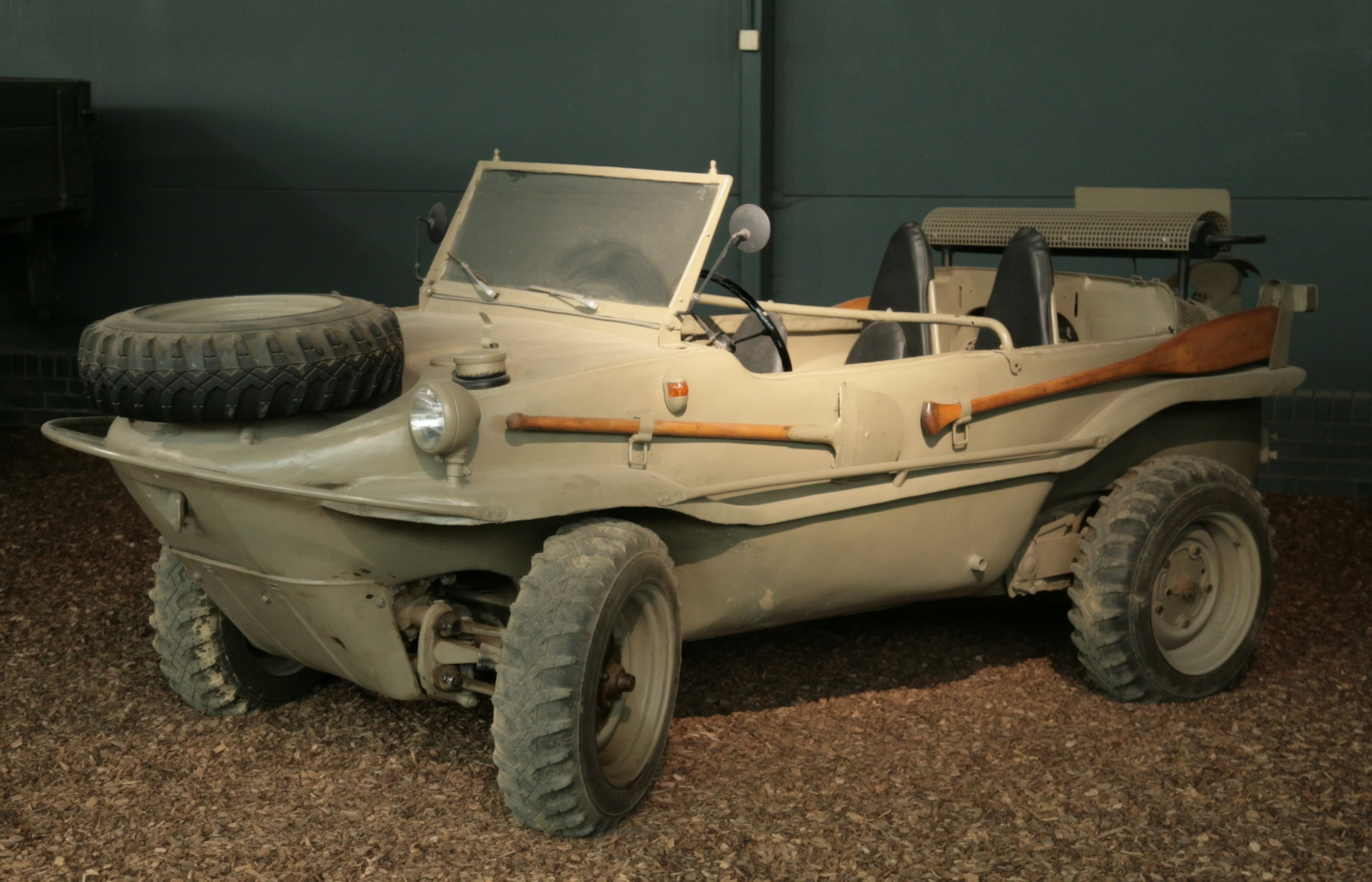
The Porsche-designed Schwimmwagen is the most-produced amphibious car in history.

During World War II, Volkswagen production turned to the military version of the Beetle, the Kübelwagen (of which 52,000 were produced), and Schwimmwagen (of which 15,584 were produced). Porsche produced several designs for heavy tanks during the war, losing out to Henschel & Son in both contracts that ultimately led to the Tiger I and the Tiger II. However, not all this work was wasted, as the chassis Porsche designed for the Tiger I was used as the base for the Elefant tank destroyer. Porsche also developed the Maus super-heavy tank in the closing stages of the war, producing two prototypes. Ferdinand Porsche's biographer, Fabian Müller, wrote that Porsche had thousands of people forcibly brought to work at its factories during the war. The workers wore the letter "P" on their clothing at all times. It stood not for "Porsche", but for "Poland".

At the end of World War II in 1945, the Volkswagen factory at KdF-Stadt fell to the British. Ferdinand lost his position as chairman of the board of management of Volkswagen, and Ivan Hirst, a British Army major, was put in charge of the factory. (Note: In Wolfsburg, the Volkswagen company magazine dubbed him "The British Major who saved Volkswagen".) On 15 December 1945, Ferdinand was arrested for war crimes, but not tried. During his 20-month imprisonment, his son, Ferry Porsche, decided to build his own car because he could not find an existing one that he wanted to buy. He also had to steer the company through some of its most difficult days until his father's release in August 1947.

The first models of what was to become the Porsche 356 were built in a small sawmill in Gmünd, Austria. The prototype car was shown to German auto dealers, and when pre-orders reached a set threshold, production (with aluminum body) was begun by Porsche Konstruktionen GesmbH, founded by Ferry and Louise. Many regard the 356 as the first Porsche simply because it was the first model sold by the fledgling company. After production of the 356 was taken over by the father's Dr. Ing. h.c. F. Porsche GmbH in 1950, Porsche commissioned Zuffenhausen-based company Reutter Karosserie, which had previously collaborated with the firm on Volkswagen Beetle prototypes, to produce the 356's steel body. In 1952, Porsche constructed the Werk 2 assembly plant across the street from Reutter Karosserie; the main road in front of Werk 1, the oldest Porsche building, is now known as Porschestraße. The 356 was road-certified in 1948.

=== Company logo ===
Arms of Württemberg

Arms of Stuttgart

Porsche's company logo stems from the coat of arms of the Free People's State of Württemberg of Weimar Germany, which had Stuttgart as its capital (the Bundesland of Württemberg-Hohenzollern used the same arms from 1945 to 1952, while Stuttgart during these years operated as the capital of adjacent Württemberg-Baden). The arms of Stuttgart appear in the middle of the logo as an inescutcheon, as the company had its headquarters in Stuttgart. The heraldic symbols, combined with the texts "Porsche" and "Stuttgart", do not form a conventional coat of arms, since heraldic achievements never spell out the name of the armiger, nor the armiger's home town in the shield.

In 1952, Württemberg-Baden, Württemberg-Hohenzollern, and Baden became part of the present Bundesland of Baden-Württemberg after the political consolidation of West Germany in 1949, but the old design of the arms of Württemberg lives on in the Porsche logo. On 30 January 1951, not long before the formation of Baden-Württemberg, Ferdinand Porsche died from complications following a stroke.

=== Developments ===
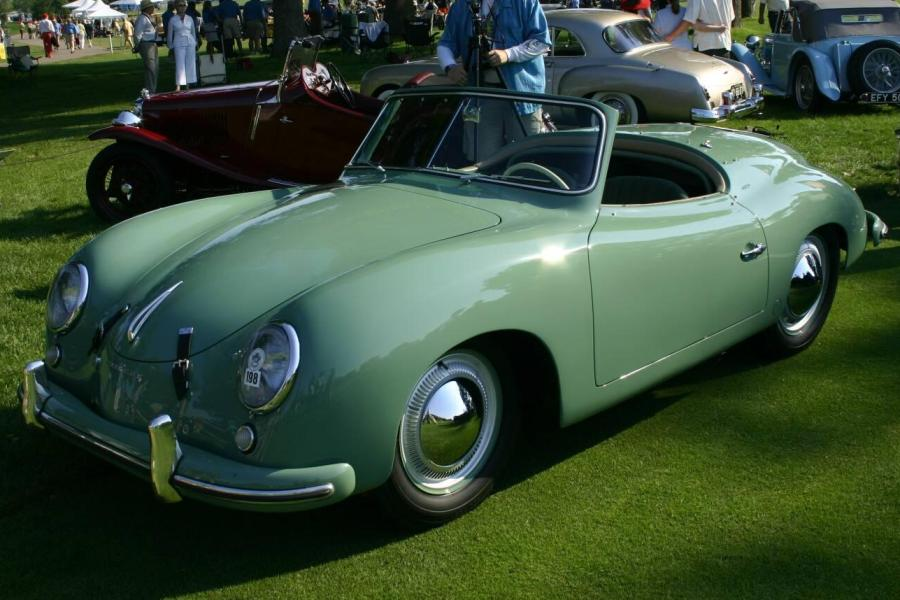
A 1952 Porsche 356 K/9-1 prototype.

In post-war Germany, parts were generally in short supply, so the 356 automobile used components from the Volkswagen Beetle, including the engine case from its internal combustion engine, transmission, and several parts used in the suspension. The 356, however, had several evolutionary stages, A, B, and C, while in production, and most Volkswagen-sourced parts were replaced by Porsche-made parts. Beginning in 1954, the 356's engines started utilizing engine cases designed specifically for the 356. The sleek bodywork was designed by Erwin Komenda, who also had designed the body of the Beetle. Porsche's signature designs have, from the beginning, featured air-cooled rear-engine configurations (like the Beetle), rare for other car manufacturers, but producing automobiles that are very well balanced.

In 1964, after a fair amount of success in motor-racing with various models including the 550 Spyder, and with the 356 needing a major redesign, the company launched the Porsche 911, another air-cooled, rear-engined sports car, this time with a six-cylinder "boxer" engine. The team to lay out the body shell design was led by Ferry Porsche's eldest son, Ferdinand Alexander Porsche (F. A.). The design phase for the 911 caused internal problems with Erwin Komenda, who led the body design department until then. F. A. Porsche complained that Komenda made unauthorized changes to the design. Company leader Ferry Porsche took his son's drawings to neighbouring chassis manufacturer Reuter, whose workshop was later acquired by Porsche (so-called Werk 2). Afterward, Reuter became a seat manufacturer, today known as Keiper-Recaro.

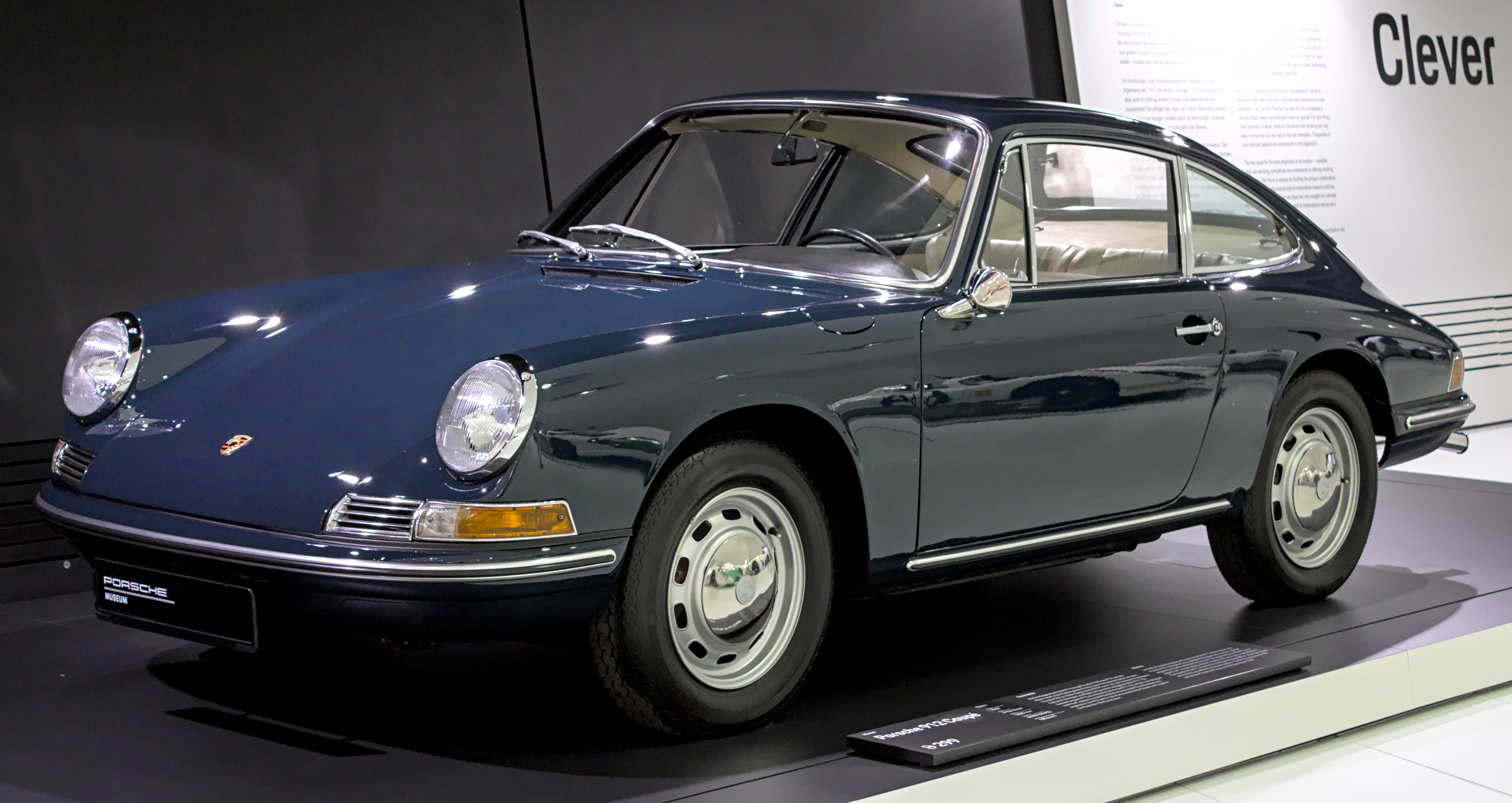
The 1960s Porsche 912

The design office gave sequential numbers to every project, but the designated 901 nomenclature contravened Peugeot's trademarks on all "x0x" names, so it was adjusted to 911. Racing models adhered to the "correct" numbering sequence of 904, 906, and 908. The 911 has become Porsche's most well-known model, being successful on the race-track, in rallies, and in terms of road car sales. It remains in production; however, after several generations of revision, current-model 911s share only the basic mechanical configuration of a rear-engined, six-cylinder coupé, and basic styling cues with the original car. A cost-reduced model with the same body, but with a 356-derived four-cylinder engine, was sold as the 912.

In 1972, the company's legal form was changed from Kommanditgesellschaft (KG), or limited partnership, to Aktiengesellschaft (AG), or public limited company, when Ferry Porsche came to believe the scale of the company outgrew a "family operation", after learning about Soichiro Honda's "no family members in the company" policy at Honda. This led to the establishment of an executive board with members from outside the Porsche family, and a supervisory board consisting largely of family members. With this change, most family members in the operation of the company, including F. A. Porsche and Ferdinand Piëch departed from the company.

F. A. Porsche founded his own design company, Porsche Design, which is renowned for exclusive sunglasses, watches, furniture, and many other luxury articles. Louise's son and Ferry's nephew Ferdinand Piëch, who was responsible for mechanical development of Porsche's production and racing cars (including the very successful 911, 908 and 917 models), formed his own engineering bureau, and developed a five-cylinder-inline diesel engine for Mercedes-Benz. A short time later, he moved to Audi (used to be a division, then a subsidiary, of Volkswagen), and pursued his career through the entire company, ultimately becoming the chairman of Volkswagen Group.

The first chief executive officer (CEO) of Porsche AG was Ernst Fuhrmann, who had been working in the company's engine development division. Fuhrmann was responsible for the so-called Fuhrmann-engine, used in the 356 Carrera models as well as the 550 Spyder, having four overhead camshafts instead of a central camshaft with pushrods, as in the Volkswagen-derived serial engines. He planned to cease the 911 during the 1970s and replace it with the V8-front engined 928. In the end though, the 911 outlived the 928. Fuhrmann was replaced in the early 1980s by Peter W. Schutz, an American manager and self-proclaimed 911 aficionado. He was then replaced in 1988 by the former manager of German computer company Nixdorf Computer AG, Arno Bohn, who made some costly miscalculations that led to his dismissal soon after, along with that of the development director, Ulrich Bez, who was formerly responsible for BMW's Z1 model, and was CEO of Aston Martin from 2000 to 2013.

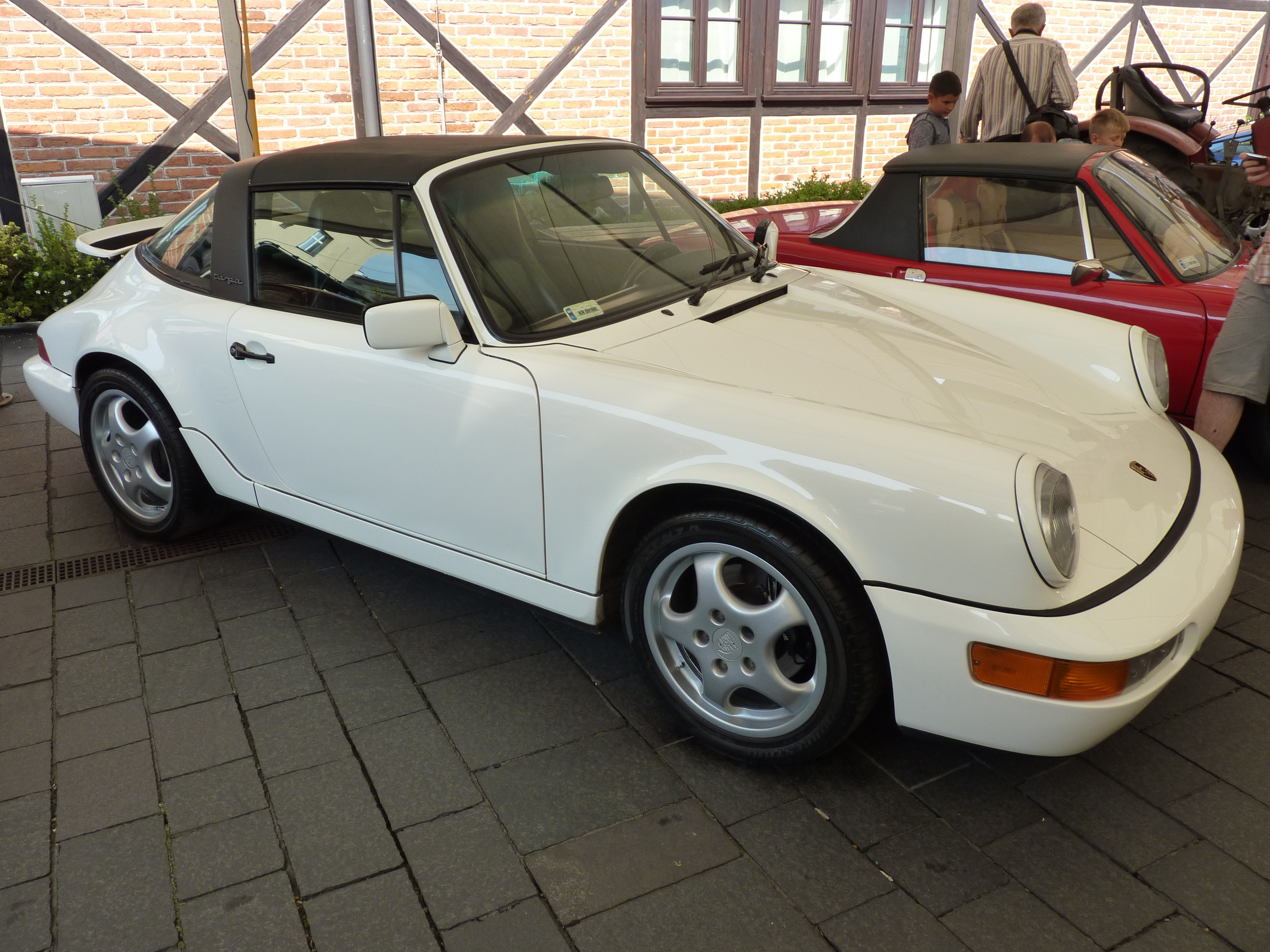
The Porsche 911 (964), introduced in 1989, was the first to be offered with Porsche's Tiptronic transmission and four-wheel drive.

In 1990, Porsche drew up a memorandum of understanding with Toyota to learn and benefit from Japanese lean manufacturing methods. In 2004, it was reported that Toyota was assisting Porsche with hybrid technology.

Following the dismissal of Bohn, Heinz Branitzki, a longtime Porsche employee, was appointed as interim CEO. Branitzki served in that position until Wendelin Wiedeking became CEO in 1993. Wiedeking took over the chairmanship of the board at a time when Porsche appeared vulnerable to a takeover by a larger company. During his long tenure, Wiedeking transformed Porsche into a very efficient and profitable company.

Ferdinand Porsche's nephew, Ferdinand Piëch, was chairman and CEO of the Volkswagen Group from 1993 to 2002 and is chairman of the Volkswagen AG Supervisory Board since then. With 12.8 percent of the Porsche SE voting shares, he also remains the second-largest individual shareholder of Porsche SE after his cousin, F. A. Porsche, which had 13.6 percent.

Porsche's 2002 introduction of the Cayenne also marked the unveiling of a new production facility in Leipzig, Saxony, which once accounted for nearly half of Porsche's annual output. In 2004, production of the 456 kilowatts (620 PS; 612 bhp) Carrera GT commenced in Leipzig, and at EUR 450,000 ($440,000 in the United States), it was the most expensive production model Porsche ever built.

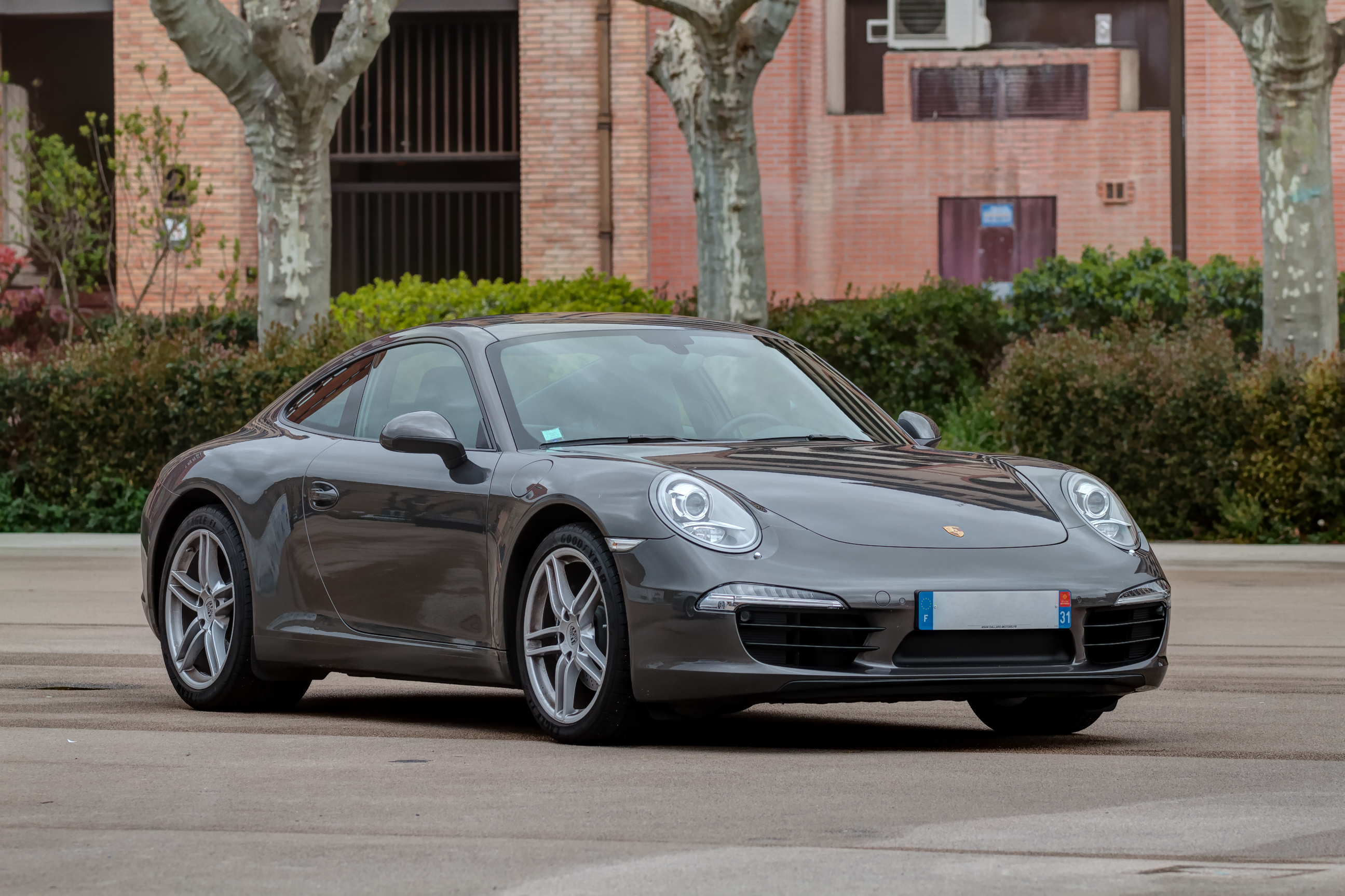
Porsche 911 (991)

In mid-2006, after years of the Boxster (and later the Cayenne) as the best-selling Porsche in North America, the 911 regained its position as Porsche's best-seller in the region. The Cayenne and 911 have cycled as the top-selling model since. In Germany, the 911 outsells the Boxster/Cayman and Cayenne.

In May 2011, Porsche Cars North America announced plans to spend $80–$100 million, but will receive about $15 million in economic incentives to move its North American headquarters from Sandy Springs, a suburb of Atlanta, to Aerotropolis Atlanta, a new mixed-use development on the site of the old Ford Hapeville plant adjacent to Hartsfield–Jackson Atlanta International Airport. Designed by architectural firm HOK, the headquarters will include a new office building and test track. The facility will be known by its new address, One Porsche Drive.

In October 2017, Porsche Cars North America announced the launch of Porsche Passport, a new sports car and SUV subscription program. This new offering allows consumers to access Porsche vehicles through subscribing to the service, rather than owning or leasing a vehicle. The Porsche Passport service was available initially in Atlanta, and has become available in many major cities across the US.

During the COVID-19 pandemic, in March 2020, Porsche suspended its manufacturing in Europe for two weeks: "By taking this step, the sports car manufacturer is responding to the significant acceleration in the rate of infection caused by the coronavirus and the resultant measures implemented by the relevant authorities."

In August 2022, Bloomberg News reported that Porsche has lined up interest in subscription of its initial public offering for a valuation between US$60–85 billion. It is expected to be listed on Frankfurt Stock Exchange in September.

=== Relationship with Volkswagen ===
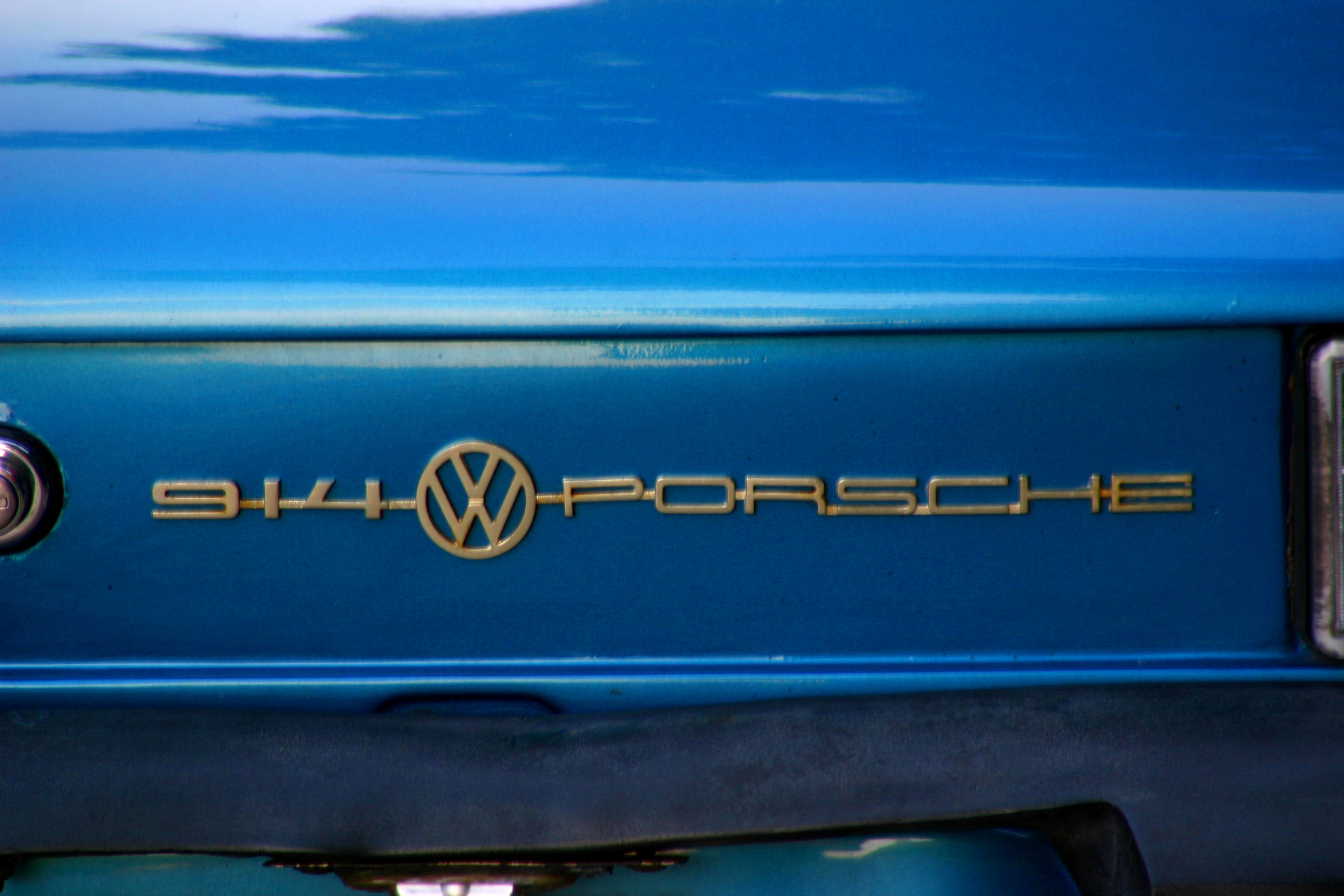
Combined badging of the European 914

The company has always had a close relationship with, initially, the Volkswagen (VW) marque, and later, the Volkswagen Group (which also owns Audi AG), because the first Volkswagen Beetle was designed by Ferdinand Porsche.

The two companies collaborated in 1969 to make the VW-Porsche 914 and 914-6, whereby the 914-6 had a Porsche engine, and the 914 had a Volkswagen engine. Further collaboration in 1976 resulted in the Porsche 912E (US only) and the Porsche 924, which used many Audi components, and was built at Audi's Neckarsulm factory, which had been NSU's. Porsche 944s were also built there, although they used far fewer Volkswagen components. The Cayenne, introduced in 2002, shares its chassis with the Volkswagen Touareg and the Audi Q7, which is built at the Volkswagen Group factory in Bratislava, Slovakia.

=== Corporate restructuring ===
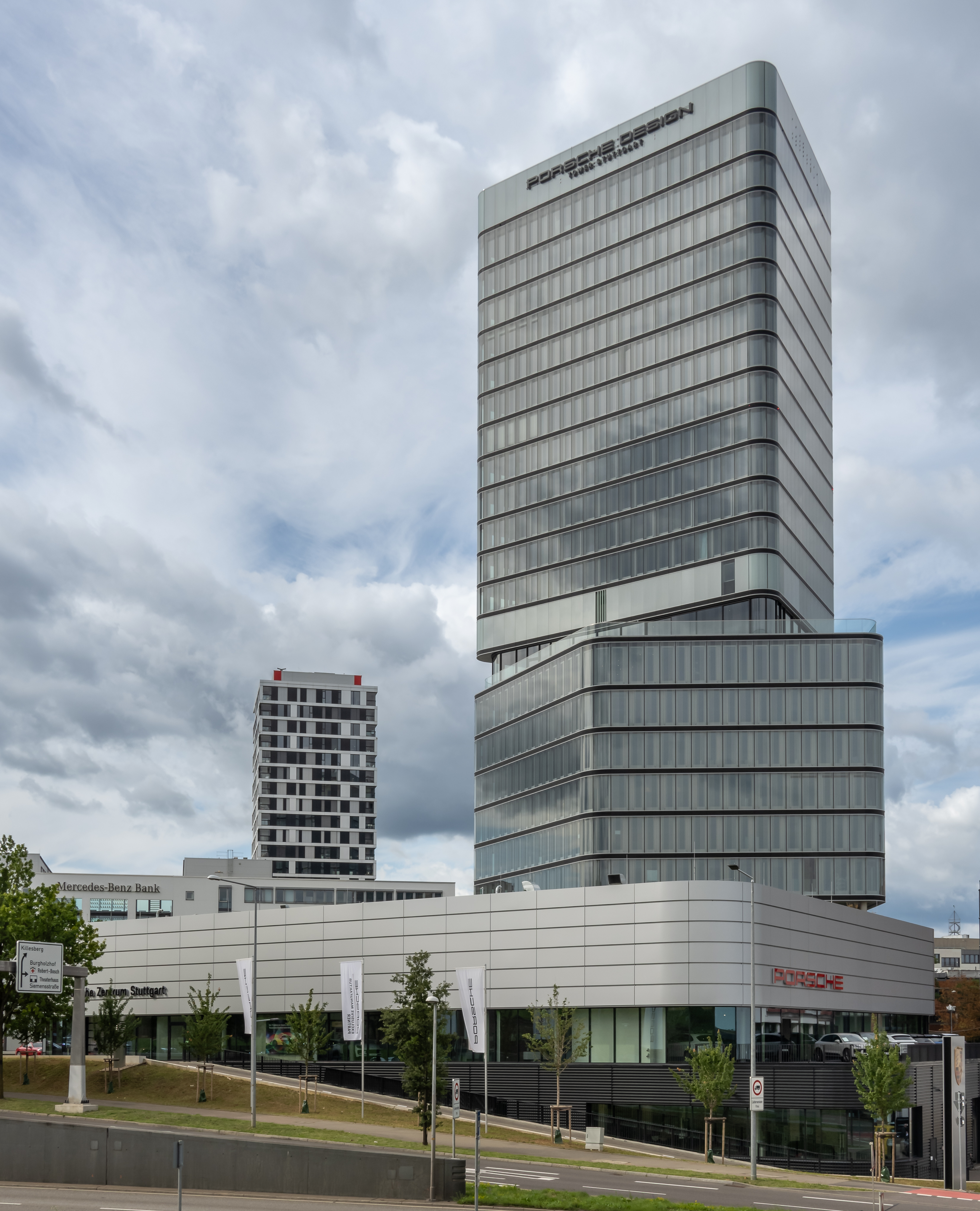
Porsche Design Tower, Stuttgart

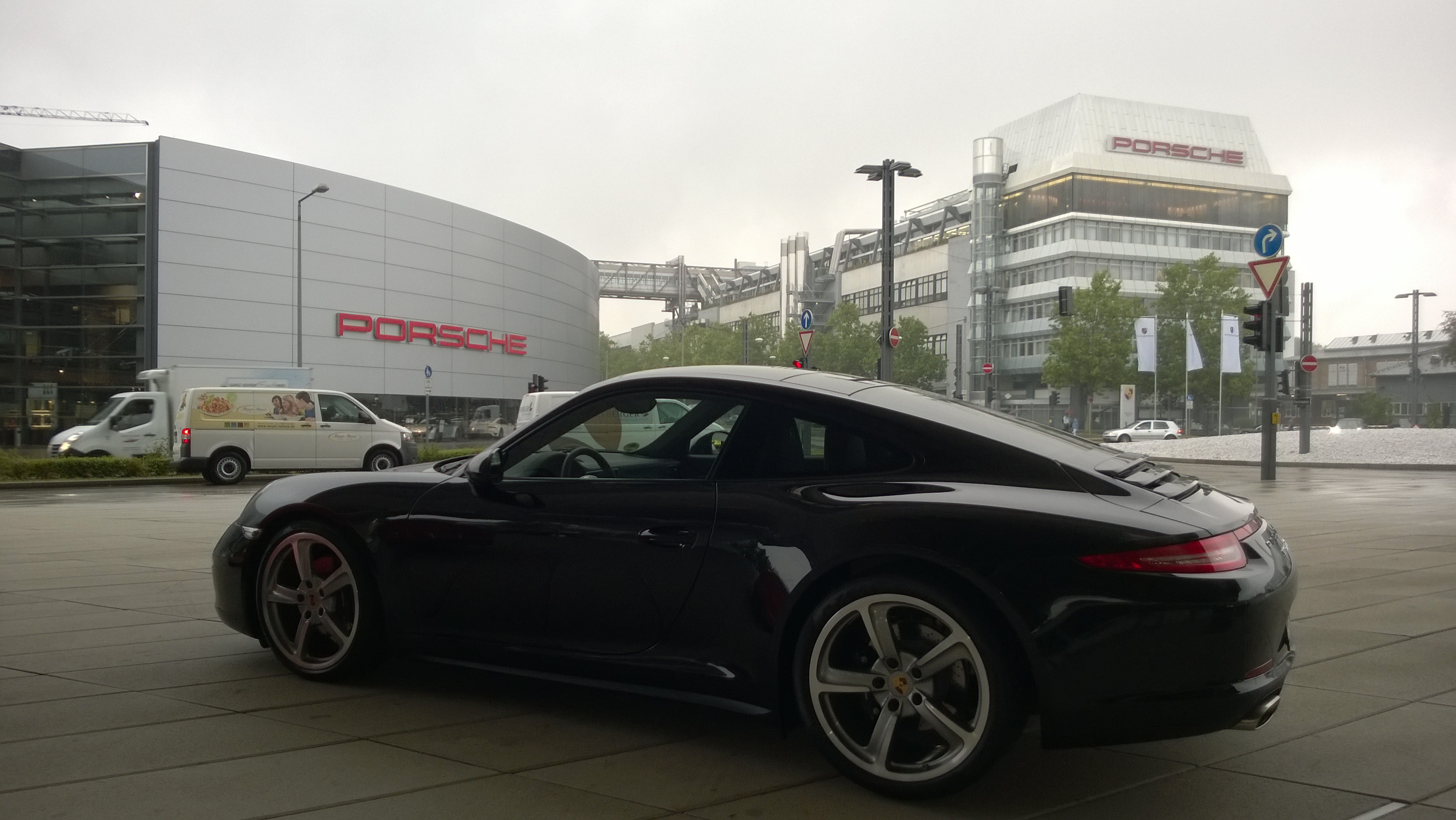
A 991 in front of the factory in which it was assembled, Porsche-Werk Stuttgart (right), and the manufacturer's central dealership, Porsche Zentrum Stuttgart (left)

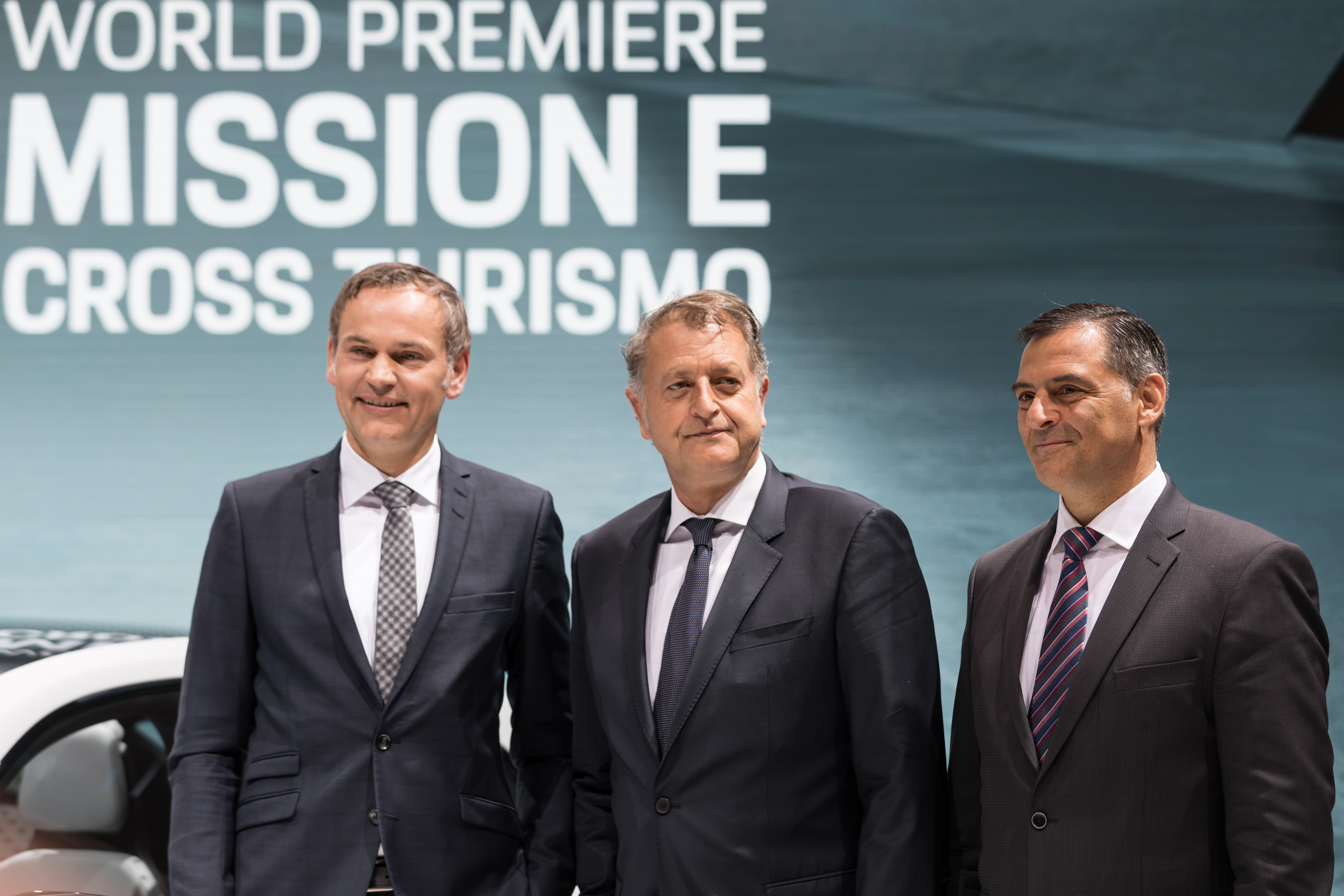
Porsche board members Oliver Blume, Detlev von Platen, Michael Steiner ...

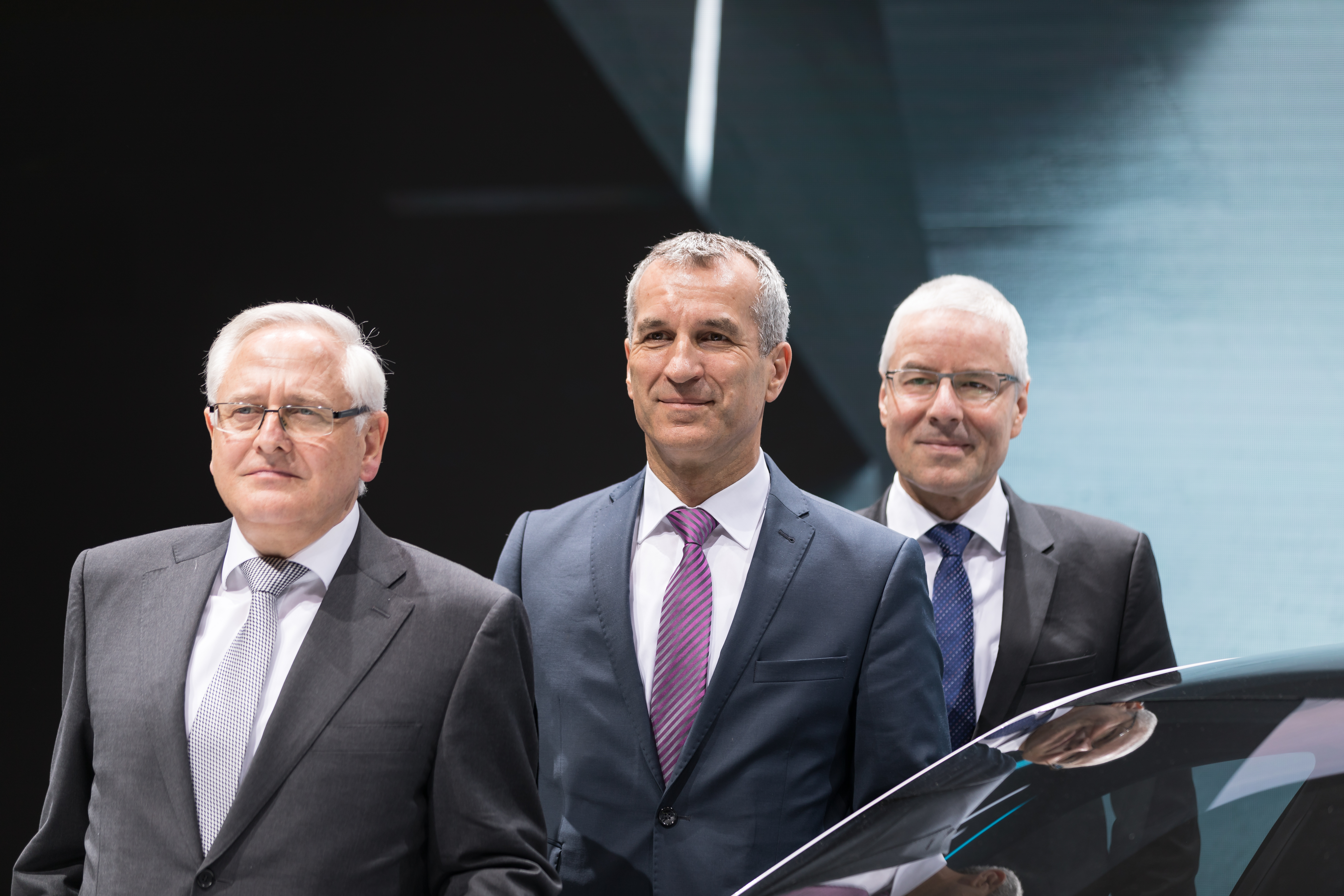
... Uwe-Karsten Städter, Albrecht Reimold and Andreas Haffner (left to right)

Porsche SE was created in June 2007 by renaming the old Dr. Ing. h.c. F. Porsche AG, and became a holding company for the families' stake in Porsche Zwischenholding GmbH (50.1%) (which in turn held 100% of the old Porsche AG) and Volkswagen AG (50.7%). At the same time, the new Dr. Ing. h.c. F. Porsche AG (Porsche AG) was created for the car manufacturing business.

In August 2009, Porsche SE and Volkswagen AG reached an agreement that the car manufacturing operations of the two companies would merge in 2011, to form an "Integrated Automotive Group". The management of Volkswagen AG agreed to 50.76% of Volkswagen AG being owned by Porsche SE in return for Volkswagen AG management taking Porsche SE management positions (in order for Volkswagen management to remain in control), and for Volkswagen AG acquiring ownership of Porsche AG.

As of the end of 2015, the 52.2% control interest in Volkswagen AG is the predominant investment by Porsche SE, and VW AG in turn controls brands and companies such as Volkswagen, Audi, SEAT, Škoda, Bentley, Bugatti, Lamborghini, Porsche AG, Ducati, Volkswagen Commercial Vehicles, Scania, MAN, as well as Volkswagen Financial Services.

Porsche AG, as a 100% subsidiary of VW AG, is responsible for the actual production and manufacture of the Porsche automobile line. The company currently produces Porsche 911, Boxster and Cayman sports cars, the Cayenne and Macan sport utility vehicles and the four-door Panamera.

In addition to its subsidiaries Porsche Design and Porsche Engineering, Porsche AG owns the consulting firm MHP Management- und IT-Beratung, which was fully acquired by January 2024. Porsche also has a 29% share in German engineering and design consultancy Bertrandt AG. In 2018, Porsche acquired a 10% minority shareholding stake of the Croatian electric sportscar manufacturer Rimac Automobili to form a development partnership.

=== Initial public offering ===
In February 2022, Volkswagen AG announced that it would examine the feasibility of a possible IPO of Porsche AG. The share capital of Porsche AG has been divided into 50% non-voting preference shares and 50% ordinary shares. Volkswagen AG will retain 75% of ordinary shares, while Porsche SE will acquire 25% of ordinary shares. Volkswagen AG will also retain 75% of preference shares, while 25% of preference shares (12.5% of share capital) will be sold during IPO, while Qatar Investment Authority has already committed to buy 4.99% of preference shares, leaving another 20.01% (10% of share capital), to other investors. As part of the preliminary offering, 113,875 thousand shares were sold at the upper limit of the price range - 82.5 euros. Thus, the value of the company was estimated at 75 billion euros. In the first hours of trading on the Frankfurt Stock Exchange on 29 September, the share price rose to 84 euros.

=== Australian eFuel operations ===
In April 2022, Porsche Australia announced it is planning to open an e-fuel manufacturing facility in the island state of Tasmania. The plant will be the first of its type in the country. The facility is to be named the HIF (Highly Innovative Fuels) Tasmania Carbon Neutral eFuel Plant. It is slated to open in 2026.

=== 2025 and financial downturn ===
Porsche’s operating profit in 2025 collapsed by roughly 98%, falling from approximately €5.3 billion in 2024 to €90 million. This resulted in an operating margin of only 0.3%, down from 14.5% in 2024. Global sales were down 10% from 310,718 in 2024 to 279,449 in 2025. The company still produced a profit in 2025. The massive decline in profits was generally attributed:

- Porsche AG reversed a high-value investment in electric vehicle research and production resulting in heavy write-down of €3.9 billion restructuring charge due to BEV / electric vehicle sales stagnation
- Continued significant sales drops in China of ~28% drop in 2024 followed by ~26% decline in 2025
- United States tariffs increased to 15% and briefly 25% on importing “finished vehicles”

New CEO Michael Leiters has said he is focusing on a leaner, more efficient model lineup, while reducing reliance on volume. After Q1 results Porsche did not change its full year 2026 forecast of 5% to 7% profit margin range.

== Leadership ==
Chairman of the Board

- Wolfgang Porsche - 2007 -

Chief Executive Officer

- Ferry Porsche - 1944 – 1972
- Ernst Fuhrmann - 1972 – 1980
- Peter Schutz - 1981 – 1987
- Heinz Branitzki - 1988 – 1990
- Arno Bohn - 1990 – 1992
- Wendelin Wiedeking - 1993 – 2009
- Michael Macht - 2009 – 2010
- Matthias Müller - 2010 – 2015
- Oliver Blume - 2015 - 2025
- Michael Leiters - 1 January 2026

== Engineering services ==
Porsche's subsidiary Porsche Engineering develops and tests vehicles, components and software for the company and other customers. Its headquarters are in Weissach, Germany, with teams in the Czech Republic, Romania, China and the US. It also runs the Nardò Technical Center in southern Italy and a software development office in nearby Lecce.

== Production and sales ==
The headquarters and main factory are located in Zuffenhausen, a district in Stuttgart, where Porsche produces flat-6 and V8 piston engines. Macan and Panamera are manufactured in Leipzig, and the Cayenne at the Volkswagen Group plant in Bratislava, Slovakia. Boxster and Cayman production was outsourced to Valmet Automotive in Finland from 1997 to 2011, and in 2012 production moved to Germany. Since 2011, the area of the Zuffenhausen plant has more than doubled, from 284,000 m^{2} (28.4 ha) to 614,000 m^{2} (61.4 ha), as a result of purchasing the former Layher, Deltona and Daimler sites, among others.

Porsche's headquarters and main factory are in Zuffenhausen, Stuttgart, where the 911 and Taycan are manufactured. The Macan and Panamera are produced at the company's plant in Leipzig. The Cayenne is manufactured at the Volkswagen Group plant in Bratislava, Slovakia, while some vehicles are assembled in Kulim, Malaysia, for the Malaysian and Thai markets.

Porsche moved final assembly of the Cayenne from Leipzig to Bratislava in 2017. Since 2026, the plant has also produced the electric Cayenne alongside petrol and hybrid versions. Production of the 718 Boxster and Cayman at Osnabrück ended in October 2025.

In 2015, Porsche reported selling a total of 218,983 cars, 28,953 (13.22%) as domestic German sales, and 190,030 (86.78%) internationally.

The company has been highly successful in recent times, and indeed claims to have the highest profit per unit sold of any car company in the world. Table of profits (in millions of euros) and number of cars produced. Figures from 2008/9 onwards were not reported as part of Porsche SE.

On 11 May 2017, Porsche built the one-millionth 911. An Irish green Carrera S was built for the celebration, and it will be taken on a global tour before becoming a permanent exhibit at the Porsche Museum in Stuttgart.

In August 2021, Porsche confirmed that it would be setting up a production plant in Malaysia, the first country outside of Europe. Local assembly will be handled by Porsche Malaysia's partner, Sime Darby, which has been the official distributor of the Stuttgart-based company in Malaysia since 2010.

In May 2025, Porsche North America confirmed the rumors that "production for all current 718 Boxster and 718 Cayman variants, including RS models, is scheduled to end in October of 2025". Porsche CEO Oliver Blume has confirmed future production of full-electric replacements but said they will arrive in the "medium term."

Sales by region (2025)
Region	Sales in € million	share
U.S. and Canada	12,644	35.1%
Europe without Germany	8,806	24.4%
Rest of the world	5,561	15.4%
Germany	4,791	13.3%
China incl. Hong Kong	4,237	11.8%

Year ending	Revenue	Pre-tax profit	Production	Sales
31 July 2002	€4,857m	€829m	55,050	54,234
31 July 2003	€5,583m	€933m	73,284	66,803
31 July 2004	€6,148m	€1,137m	81,531	76,827
31 July 2005	€6,574m	€1,238m	90,954	88,379
31 July 2006	€7,273m	€2,110m	102,602	96,794
31 July 2007	€7,368m	€5,857m	101,844	97,515
31 July 2008	€7,466m	€8,569m	105,162	98,652
31 July 2009	€?m	€−2,559m	76,739	75,238
31 July 2010	€7.79b	N/A	89,123	81,850
31 December 2010	€9.23b	€1.67b	N/A	97,273
31 December 2011	€10.9b	€2.05b	127,793	116,978
31 December 2012	€13.9b	€2.44b	151,999	143,096
31 December 2013	€14.3b	€2.78b	165,808	162,145
31 December 2014	€17.2b	€3.06b	203,097	187,208
31 December 2015	€21.5b	€3.382b	234,497	225,121
31 December 2019	€28.5b	€4.05b	274,463	280,800
31 December 2020	€28.7b	€4.38b	263,236	272,162
31 December 2021	€33.1b	€5.73b	300,081	301,915
31 December 2022	€37.6b	€6.77b	321,321	309,884

=== Production composition ===
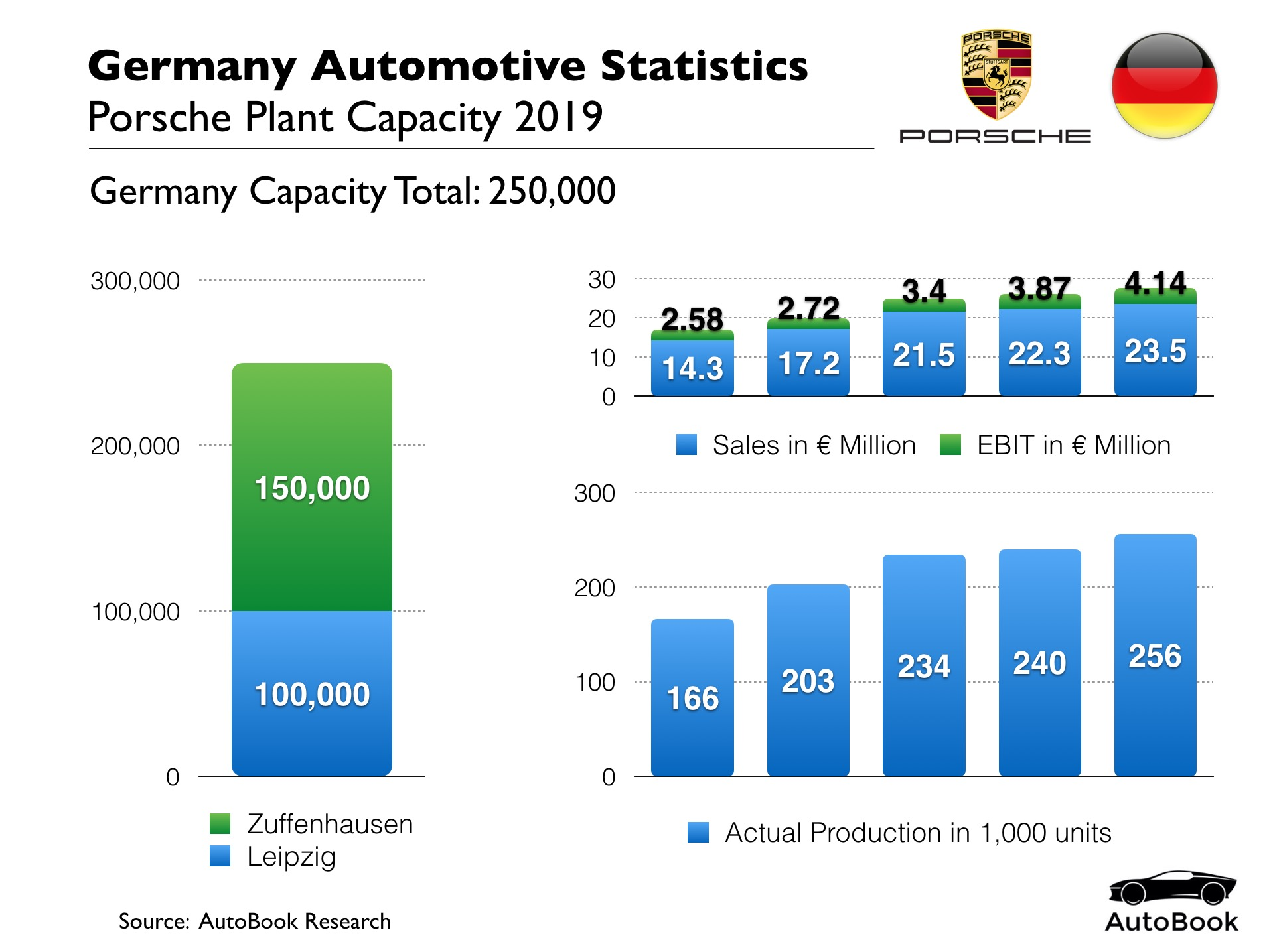
Porsche production statistics (2018)

Of the 255,683 cars produced in 2017, 33,820 were 911 models, 26,427 were Boxster and Cayman cars, 59,068 were Cayennes, 37,605 were Panameras and 98,763 were Macans.

Of the 268,691 cars produced in 2018, 36,236 were 911 models, 23,658 were 718 Boxster and Cayman cars, 79,111 were Cayennes, 35,493 were Panameras, 93,953 were Macans, and 240 Taycan pre-series vehicles.

Of the 263,236 cars produced in 2020, 28,672 were 911 models, 22,655 were 718 Boxster and Cayman cars, 82,137 were Cayennes, 21,832 were Panameras, 78,490 were Macans, and 29,450 were Taycan vehicles.

Of the 321,321 vehicles produced in 2022, 41,947 were 911 models, 18,080 were 718 Boxster and Cayman models, 91,117 were Macans, 98,113 were Cayennes, 35,241 were Panameras, and 36,823 were Taycan models.

Of the 302,750 vehicles produced in 2024, 49,095 were 911 models, 23,790 were 718 Boxster and Cayman models, 84,330 were Macans, 93,864 were Cayennes, 30,369 were Panameras, and 21,302 were Taycan models.

==== U.S. sales ====
The base price as of March 2025 is:

- 911: $127,700
- Panamera: $106,300
- Taycan: $100,300
- Cayenne: $79,200
- 718: $72,800
- Macan: $63,100

Annual US sales 2003–2005
Model	2003		2004		2005	
Model	Units	% of total	Units	% of total	Units	% of total
911 (996)	9,935 (▼18%)	33%	10,227 (▲3%)	31%	10,653 (▲4%)	31%
Boxster (986)	6,432 (▼38%)	21%	3,728 (▼42%)	11%	8,327 (▲123%)	25%
Cayenne	13,661	45%	19,134 (▲40%)	57%	14,524 (▼24%)	43%
Total	30,028 (▲33%)		33,289 (▲11%)		33,859 (▲2%)	

Annual US sales 2006–2008
Model	2006		2007		2008	
Model	Units	% of total	Units	% of total	Units	% of total
911 (997)	12,702 (▲19%)	35%	13,153 (▲4%)	36%	8,324 (▼37%)	30%
Boxster (987)	4,850 (▼42%)	14%	3,904 (▼24%)	11%	2,982 (▼24%)	11%
Cayman	7,313	20%	6,249 (▼17%)	17%	3,513 (▼44%)	13%
Cayenne	11,141 (▼23%)	31%	13,370 (▲20%)	36%	12,898 (▼4%)	46%
Total	36,095 (▲7%)		36,680 (▲2%)		27,717 (▼24%)	

Annual US sales 2009–2011
Model	2009		2010		2011	
Model	Units	% of total	Units	% of total	Units	% of total
911 (997)	6,839 (▼17.8%)	35.00%	5,735 (▼16%)	23%	6,016 (▲5%)	21%
Boxster/Cayman	3,875 (▼39.4%)	19.00%	3,499 (▼9%)	14%	3,150 (▼9%)	11%
Panamera	1,247	6.33%	7,741 (▲520%)	31%	6,879 (▼11%)	24%
Cayenne	7,735 (▼31%)	39%	8,343 (▲8%)	33%	12,978 (▲55%)	45%
Total	19,696 (▼24%)		25,320 (▲28%)		29,023 (▲15%)	

Annual US sales 2012–2014
Model	2012		2013		2014	
Model	Units	% of total	Units	% of total	Units	% of total
911 (997)	8,528	24%	10,442	24.67%	10,529	22%
Boxster/Cayman	3,356	10%	7,953	18.79%	7,292	15%
Panamera	7,614	22%	5,421	13%	5,740	12%
Cayenne	15,545	44.36%	18,507	44%	16,205	34,47%
Macan	n.a.	n.a.	n.a.	n.a.	7,241	15%
Total	35,043 (▲21%)		42,323 (▲21%)		47,007 (▲11%)	

Annual US sales 2015–2017
Model	2015		2016		2017	
Model	Units	% of total	Units	% of total	Units	% of total
911 (991)	9,898	19.12%	8,901	16.40%	8,970	16.19%
718 Boxster/Cayman	6,663	12.87%	6,260	11.53%	5,087	9.18%
Panamera	4,986	9.63%	4,403	8.11%	6,731	12.15%
Cayenne	16,473	31.83%	15,383	28.34%	13,203	23.83%
Macan	13,533	26.15%	19,332	35.62%	21,429	38.67%
Total	51,756 (▲10%)		54,280 (▲5%)		55,420 (▲2%)	

Annual US sales 2018–2020
Model	2018		2019		2020	
Model	Units	% of total	Units	% of total	Units	% of total
911 (991)	9,647	17%	9,265	15%	8,840 (▼4.6%)	15%
718	5,276	9%	3,880	6%	3,447 (▼11%)	6%
Taycan	n.a.	n.a.	130	0.2%	4,414	8%
Panamera	8,042	14%	6,625	11%	3,870 (▼42%)	7%
Cayenne	10,733	19%	19,001	31%	18,092 (▼5%)	32%
Macan	23,504	41%	22,667	37%	18,631 (▼18%)	33%
Total	57,202 (▲3%)		61,568 (▲8%)		57,294 (▼7%)	

Annual US sales 2021–2023
Model	2021		2022		2023	
Model	Units	% of total	Units	% of total	Units	% of total
911 (992)	10,042 (▲14%)	14%	10,204 (▲2%)	15%	11,692 (▲15%)	16%
718	4,292 (▲25%)	6%	3,484 (▼19%)	5%	4,526 (▲30%)	6%
Taycan	9,419 (▲113%)	13%	7,271 (▼23%)	10%	7,570 (▲4%)	10%
Panamera	4,257 (▲10%)	6%	4,224 (▼1%)	6%	4,205 (0%)	6%
Cayenne	17,299 (▼4%)	25%	21,194 (▲23%)	30%	20,475 (▼3%)	27%
Macan	24,716 (▲33%)	35%	23,688 (▼4%)	34%	26,947 (▲14%)	36%
Total	70,005 (▲22%)		70,065 (0%)		75,415 (▲8%)	

Annual US sales 2024–2026
Model	2024		2025		3Q.2026 YtD	
Model	Units	% of total	Units	% of total	Units	% of total
911 (992)	14,128 (▲21%)	19%	13,574 (▼4%)	18%	11,778(▲33%)	24%
718	5,698 (▲26%)	7%	6,399 (▲12%)	8%	252(▼95%)	1%
Taycan	4,747 (▼37%)	6%	4,142 (▼13%)	5%	1,616(▼56%)	3%
Panamera	3,982 (▼5%)	5%	4,651 (▲17%)	6%	2,699(▼21%)	6%
Cayenne	22,432 (▲10%)	29%	20,314 (▼9%)	27%	15,622(▲7%)	32%
Macan	25,180 (▼7%)	33%	27,139 (▲8%)	36%	17,071(▼19%)	35%
Total	76,167 (▲1%)		76,219 (0%)		49,038 (▼14%)	

=== Competitive innovation ===
In 2024, the World Intellectual Property Organization (WIPO)'s Hague Yearly Review ranked Porsche's number of industrial design applications filed under the Hague System as third in the world, with 352 applications submitted during 2023.

== Models ==
Porsche vehicle logos

Porsche 718 (Boxster and Cayman)

Porsche 911

Porsche Cayenne

Porsche Macan

Porsche Panamera

Porsche Taycan

The current Porsche model range includes sports cars from the Boxster roadster to its most famous product, the 911. The Cayman is a coupé otherwise similar to the Boxster. The Cayenne is Porsche's mid-size luxury sport utility vehicle (SUV). A high performance luxury saloon/sedan, the Panamera, was launched in 2009.

Note: models in bold are current models

=== Consumer models ===
- 356
- **911** 4-seat coupe, targa and cabriolet
  - 911 (classic)
  - 930
  - 964
  - 993
  - 996
  - 997
  - 991
  - **992**
- 911 GT1 Straßenversion
- 912
- 914
- 918 Spyder
- 924
- 928 4-seat grand tourer
- 944
- 959
- 968
- **Boxster** 2-seat roadster
  - 986
  - 987
  - 981
  - **982**
- Carrera GT
- **Cayman** 2-seat coupe
  - 987
  - 981
  - **982**
- **Cayenne** Mid-size crossover SUV
- **Macan** Compact crossover SUV
- **Panamera** 4- or "4+1"-seat liftback
- **Taycan** 4- or "4+1"-seat sedan and shooting-brake estate EV
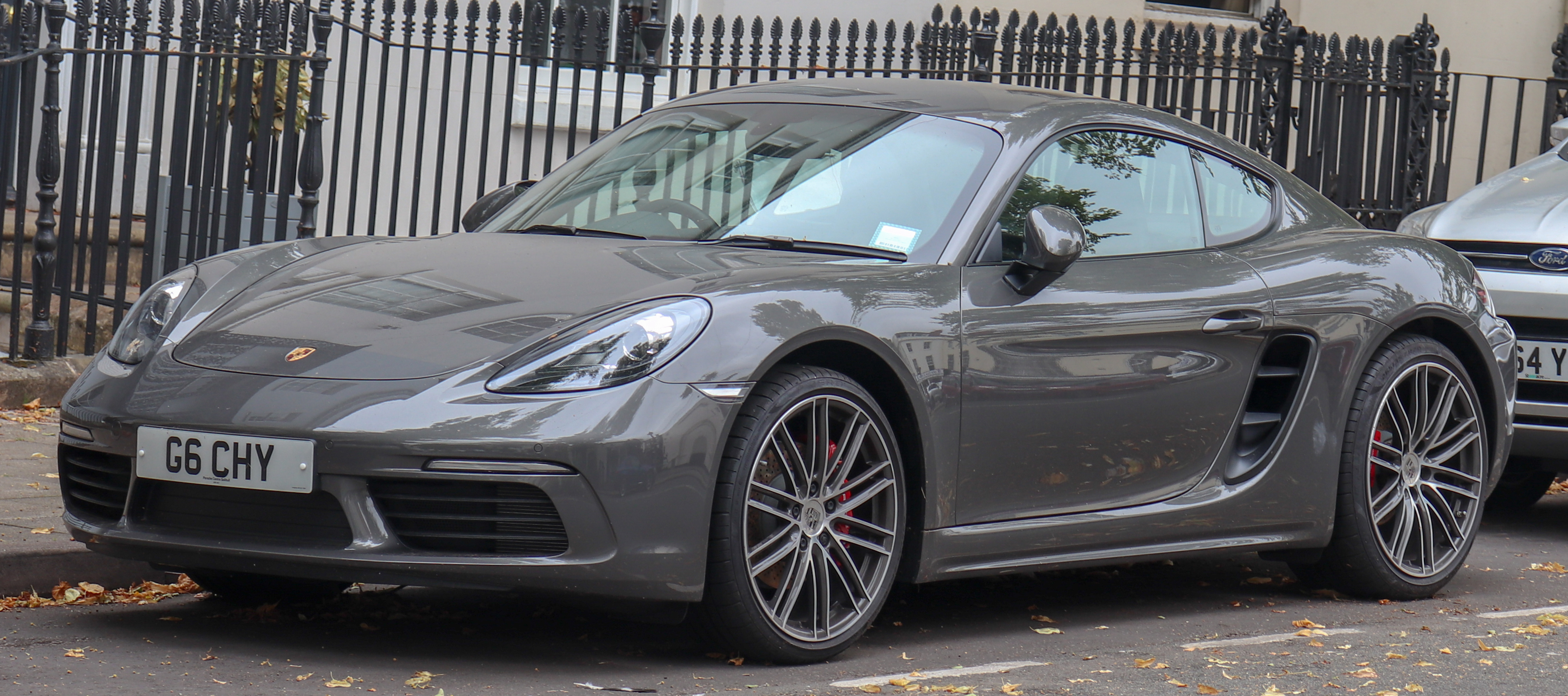
Porsche 718 Cayman

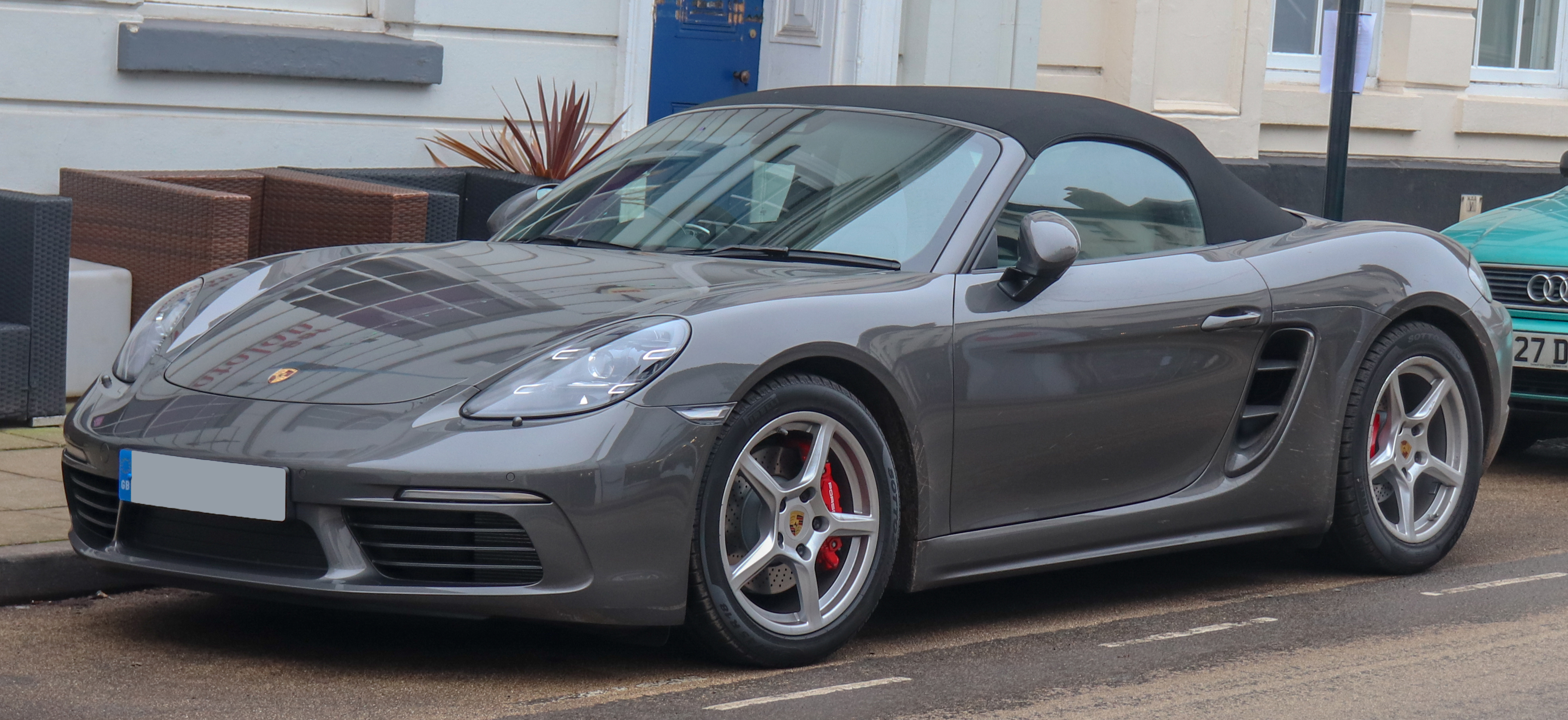
Porsche 718 Boxster

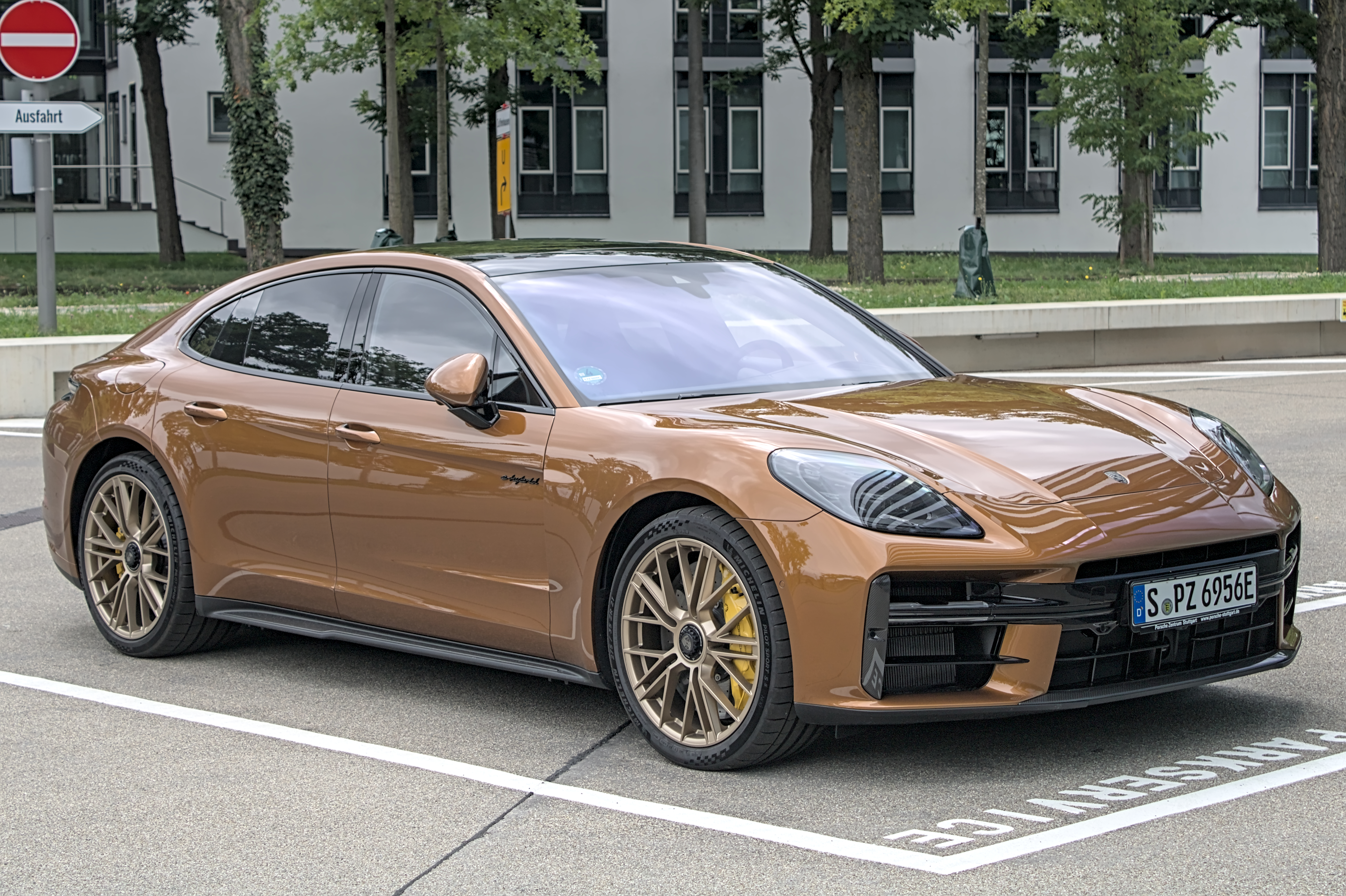
Porsche Panamera

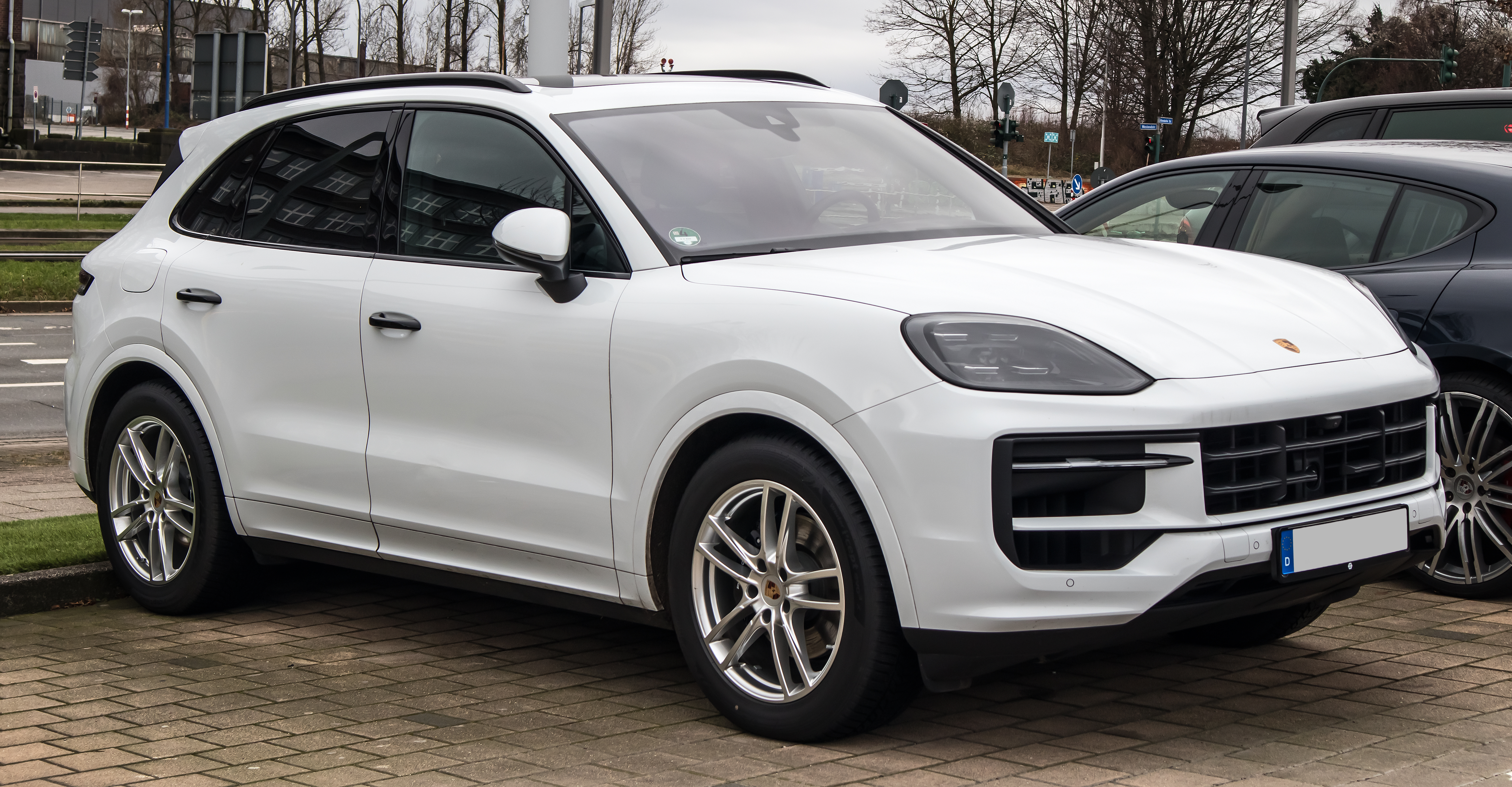
Porsche Cayenne

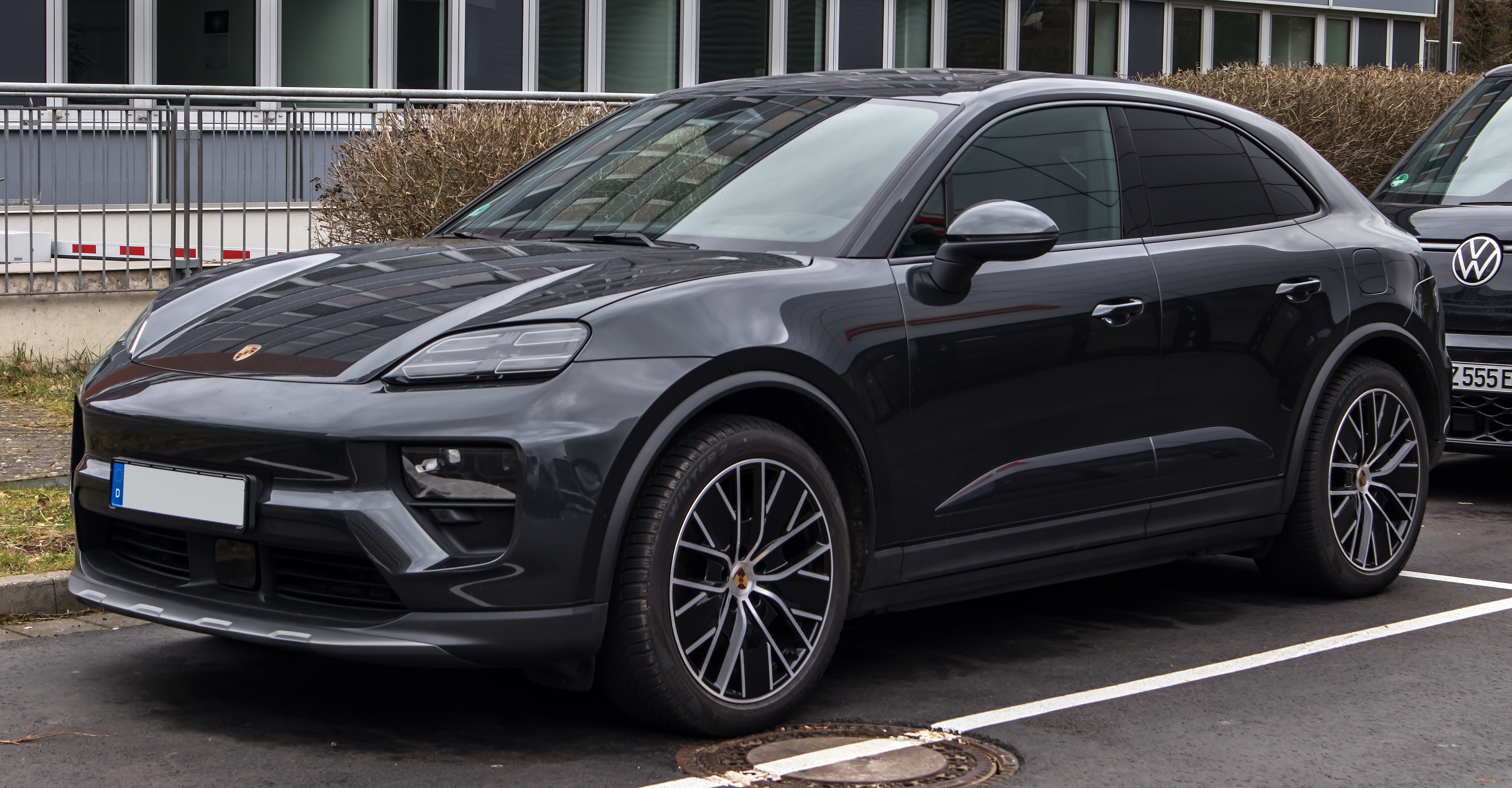
Porsche Macan

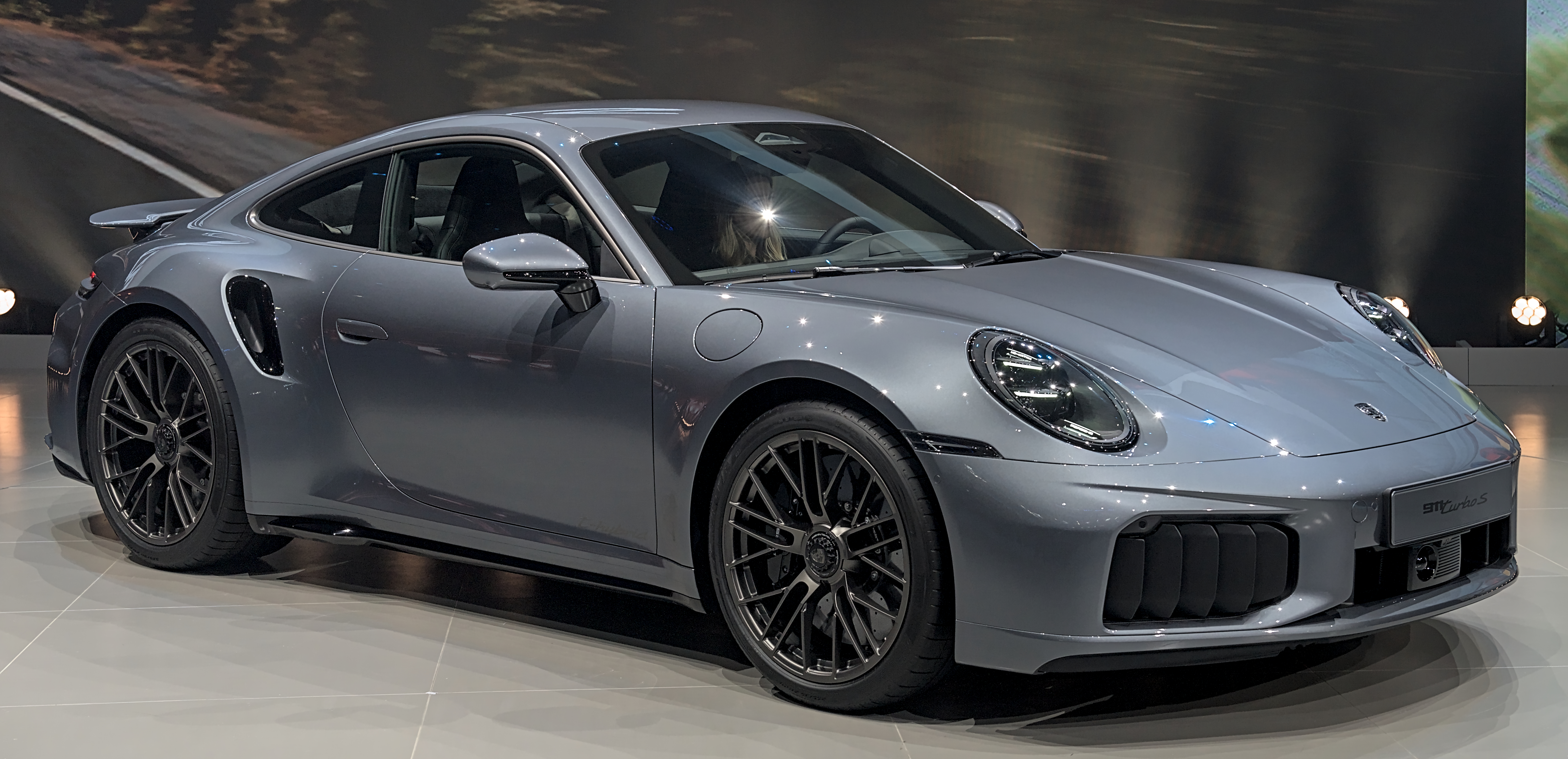
Porsche 911

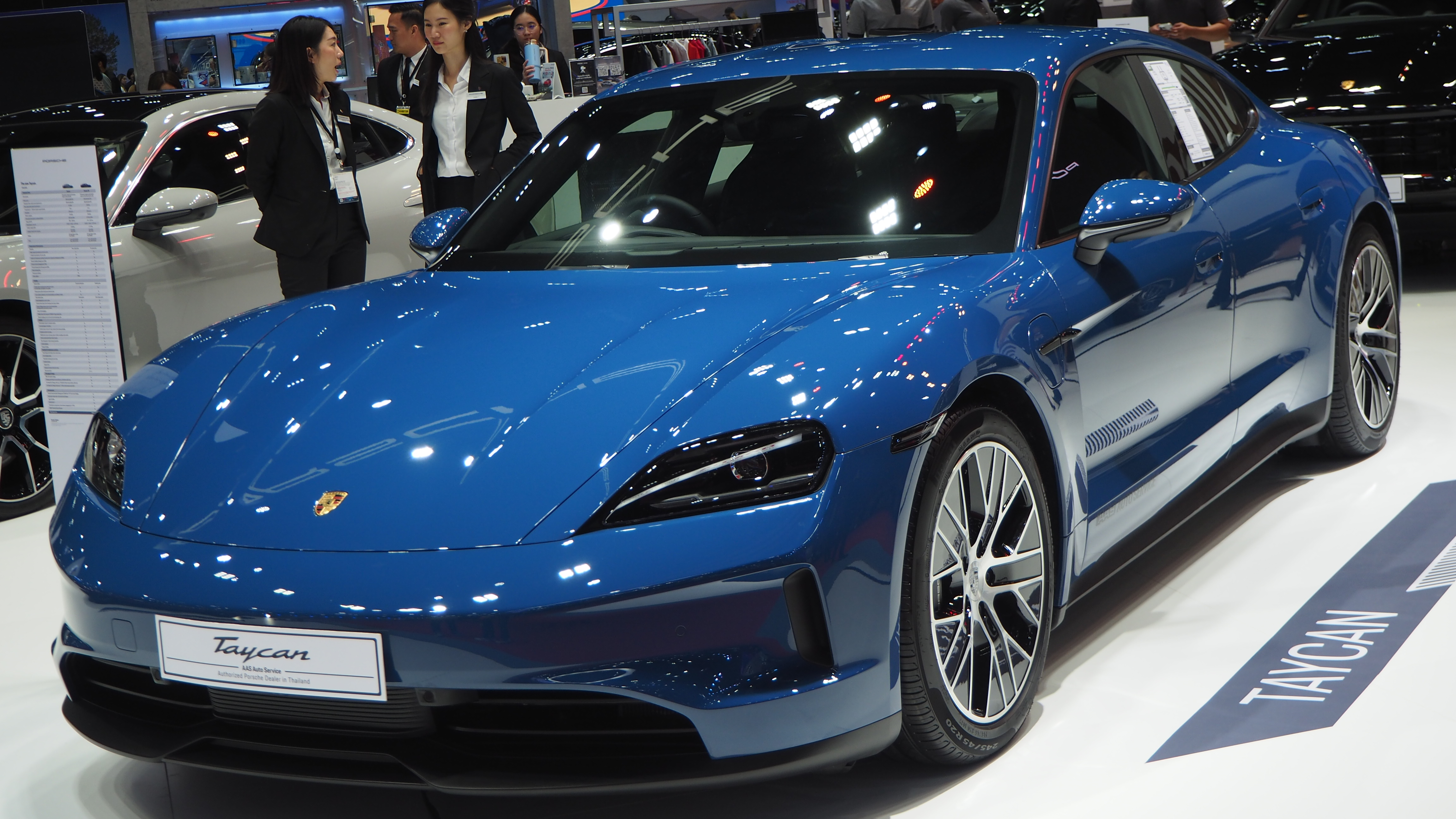
Porsche Taycan

=== Racing models ===
- 64
- 360 Cisitalia
- 550 Spyder
- 718
- 787
- 804
- 904
- 906
- 907
- 908
- 909 Bergspyder
- 910
- 911 GT1
- 917
- 919 hybrid
- 934
- 934/5
- 935
- 936
- 956
- 961
- 962
- 963
- Porsche 99X Electric
- Porsche-March 89P
- WSC-95 / LMP1-98
- LMP2000 (never raced)
- RS Spyder (9R6)

=== Prototypes and concept cars ===
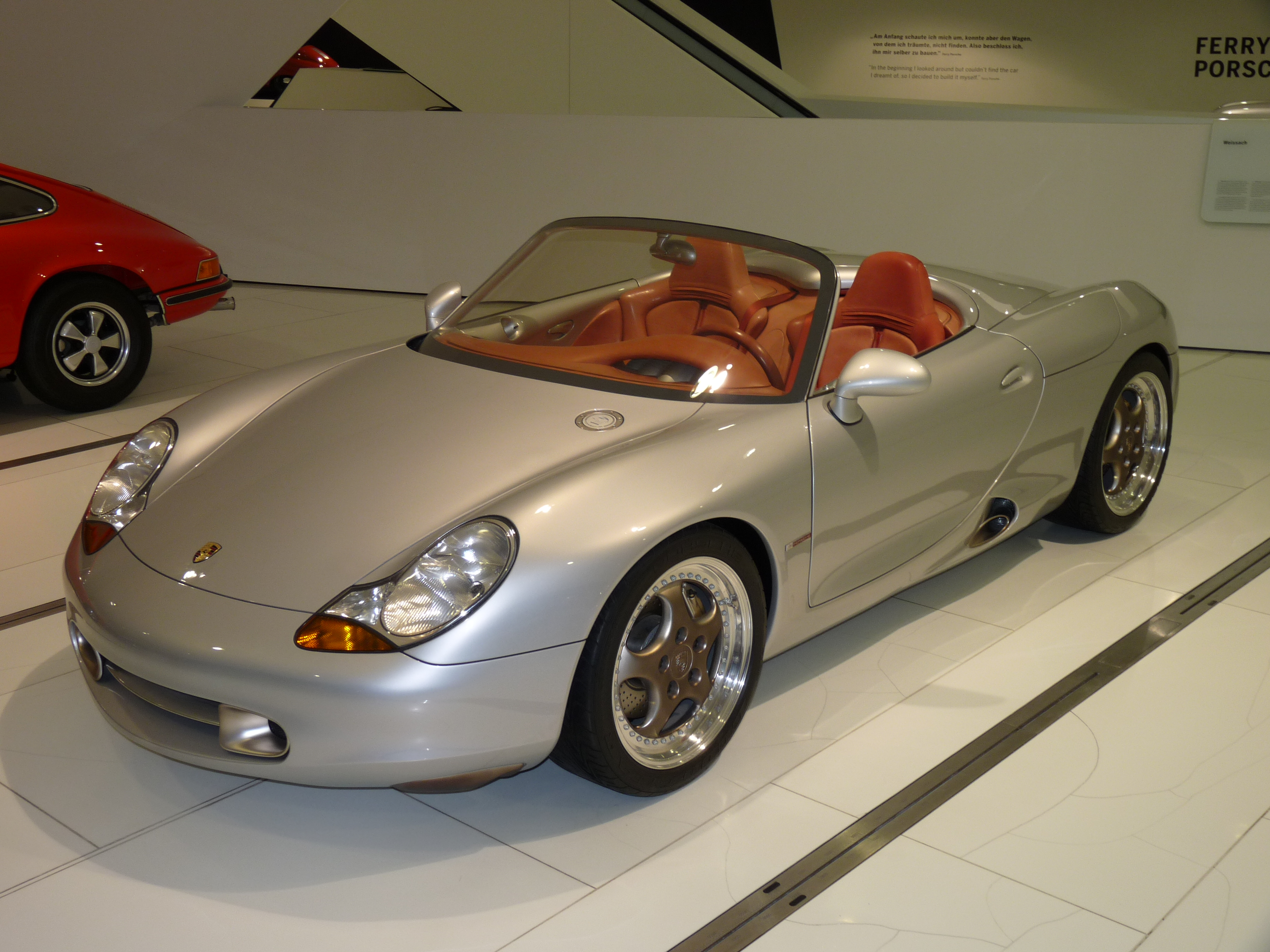
Porsche Boxster concept

- Porsche 114
- Porsche 356/1
- Porsche 695 (911 prototype)
- Porsche 901 (911 prototype)
- Porsche 916 (flat-6 914)
- Porsche 942
- Porsche 959 prototype
- 918 RSR
- Porsche 965
- Porsche 969
- Porsche 989
- Porsche Boxster concept
- Porsche C88
- Porsche Panamericana
- Porsche Boxster E
- Porsche Panamera Sport Turismo concept
- Porsche Mission E
- Porsche Mission R
- Porsche Mission X
- Porsche Mission S

=== Tractors ===
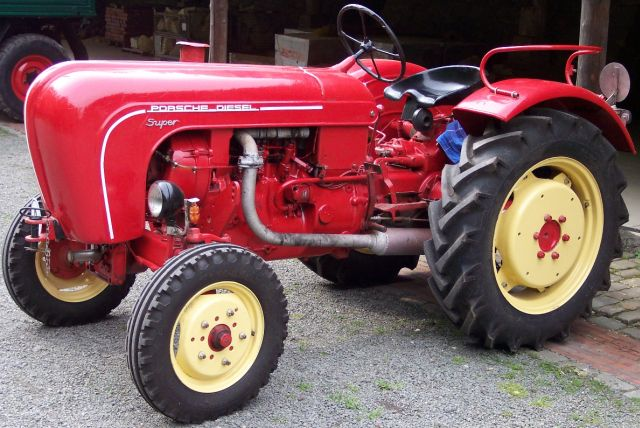
Porsche Diesel Super

- Porsche Type 110
- Porsche AP Series
- Porsche Junior (14 hp)
- Porsche Standard (25 hp)
- Porsche Super (38 hp)
- Porsche Master (50 hp)
- Porsche 312
- Porsche 108F
- Porsche R22

=== Hybrid and electric vehicles ===
In 2010, Porsche launched the Cayenne S Hybrid and announced the Panamera S Hybrid, and launched the Porsche 918 sports car in 2014, which also features a hybrid system. Also a plug-in hybrid model called the Panamera S E-Hybrid was released in October 2013 in the United States and during the fourth quarter of 2013 in several European countries.

Porsche developed a prototype electric Porsche Boxster called the Boxster E in 2011 and a hybrid version of the 911 called the GT3 R Hybrid, developed with Williams Grand Prix Engineering in 2010.

In July 2014, Porsche announced the launch by the end of 2014 of the Porsche Cayenne S E-Hybrid a plug-in hybrid, which will displace the Cayenne S Hybrid from the lineup. The S E-Hybrid will be the first plug-in hybrid in the premium SUV segment and will allow Porsche to become the first automaker with three production plug-in hybrid models.

In July 2017, Porsche installed its first 350 kW, 800V charging station, which the upcoming Porsche Mission E will use. As of 2017, the Porsche charging station is the fastest electric vehicle charging station in the world, being able to charge a Porsche Mission E up to 80% within 15 minutes. Porsche is also currently working with other manufacturers to make Porsche charging stations compatible with other electric vehicles.

In August 2018, Porsche announced that the formerly named Mission E electric car would be named "Taycan", meaning 'leaping horse'. The prototype electric car was expected to be revealed in 2019 after its completion. Porsche Taycan went on sale in 2020.

=== Aircraft engines ===
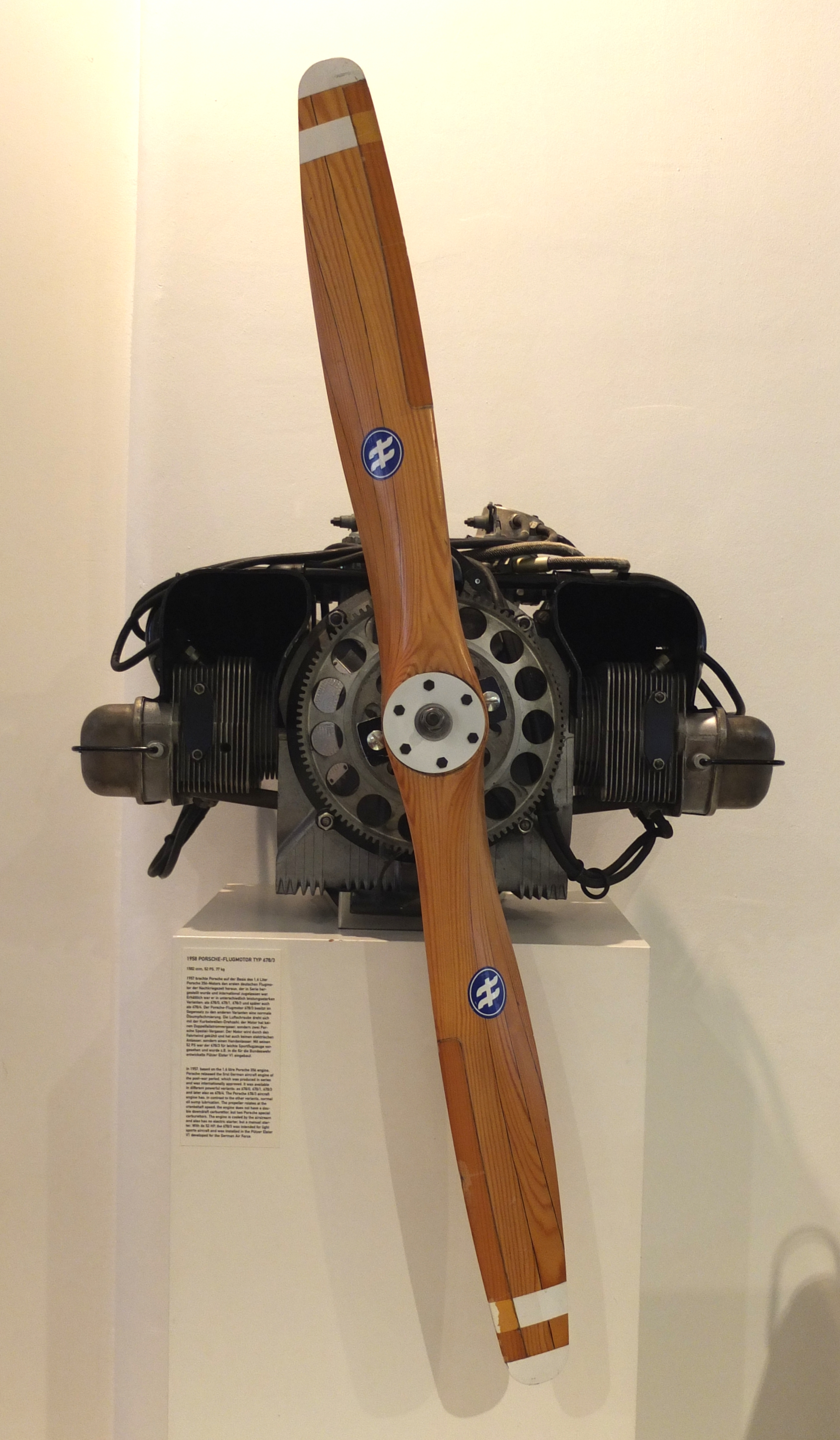
Porsche aircraft engine (1958) in Prototype Museum, Hamburg

See Porsche PFM 3200.

=== Electric bicycles ===
In 2021, Porsche released an electric mountain bike in partnership with Rotwilde, with features such as an integrated cockpit designed by Magura GmbH and drive unit, drivetrain, and electronic shifting designed by Shimano. Porsche followed this by completely buying eBike motor and battery company Fazua in 2022 and sports bikes company Greyp Bikes, sister company of Rimac Automobili, in 2023. Greyp Bikes was renamed to Porsche eBike Performance GmbH.

== Motorsport ==
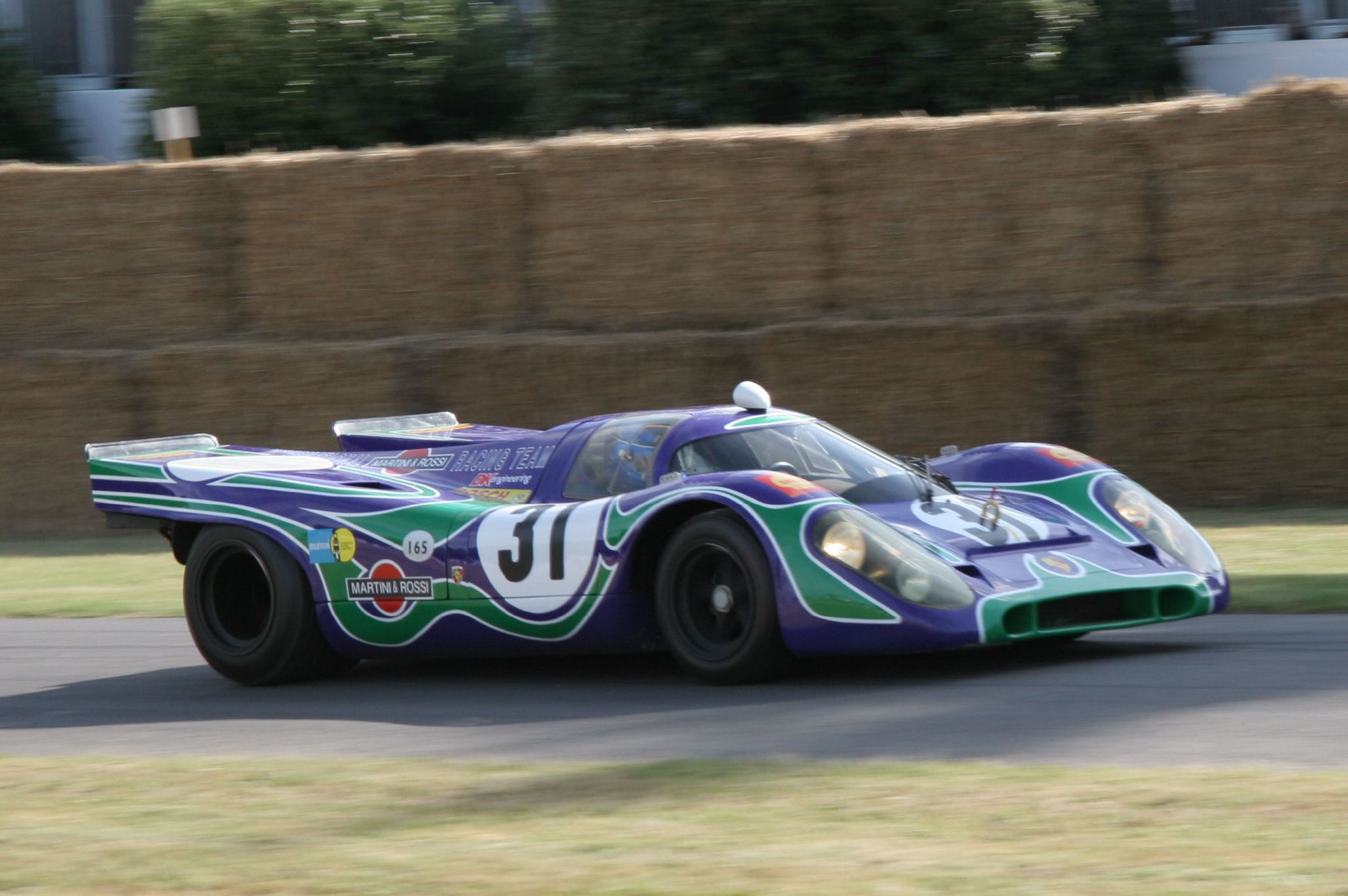
The Martini Racing blue and green "psychedelic" livery on a 1970 917K. This car raced at Watkins Glen in 1970.

Porsche has a record 19 outright wins at the 24 Hours of Le Mans. Porsche is currently the world's largest race car manufacturer. In 2006, Porsche built 195 race cars for various international motor sports events. In 2007, Porsche was expected to construct no fewer than 275 dedicated race cars (7 RS Spyder LMP2 prototypes, 37 GT2 spec 911 GT3-RSRs, and 231 911 GT3 Cup vehicles).

== Pronunciation ==
In keeping with the family name of founder Ferdinand Porsche, the company's name is pronounced [ˈpɔʁʃə] in German, which corresponds to /ˈpɔːrʃə/ POR-shə in English, homophonous with the feminine name Portia. However, in English it is often mispronounced as a single syllable /pɔːrʃ/ PORSH without a final /ə/. In German orthography, word-final ⟨e⟩ is not silent but is instead an unstressed schwa.

== Reputation ==
In a survey conducted by the Luxury Institute in New York, Porsche was awarded the title of "the most prestigious automobile brand". Five hundred households with a gross annual income of at least $200,000 and a net worth of at least $720,000 participated.

Porsche won the J.D. Power and Associates Initial Quality Study (IQS) in 2006, 2009, 2010, and 2014.

== Reliability ==
A Canadian study in 2011 revealed that 97.4 percent of Porsches from the last 25 years are still on the road.

In 2014, the Cayman and Boxster made the Consumer Reports list for most reliable vehicles on the road.

Porsche's 911 has been officially named by the TÜV (Technischer Überwachungsverein; Technical Inspection Association) as Germany's most reliable car.

== See also ==
- List of automobile manufacturers of Germany
- List of Porsche engines
- Porsche VIN specification
