= Macht =

Macht is a surname. Notable people with the surname include:

- David Macht (1882–1961), American pharmacologist
- Gabriel Macht (born 1972), American actor
- Michael Macht (born 1960), German chief executive
- Stephen Macht (born 1942), American actor
