= Porsche 64 =

Car model

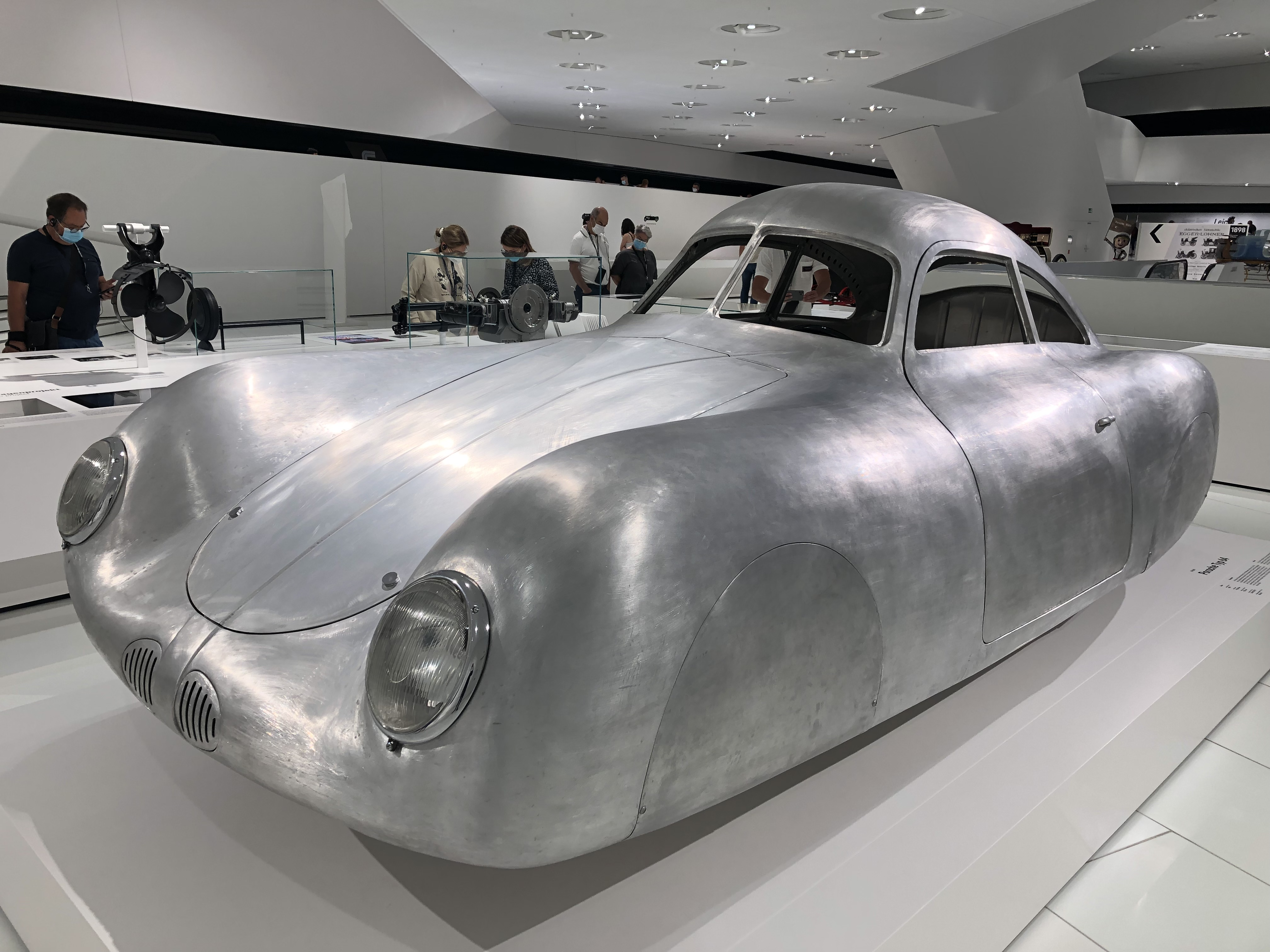
Porsche Type 64 in bare metal at the Porsche Museum

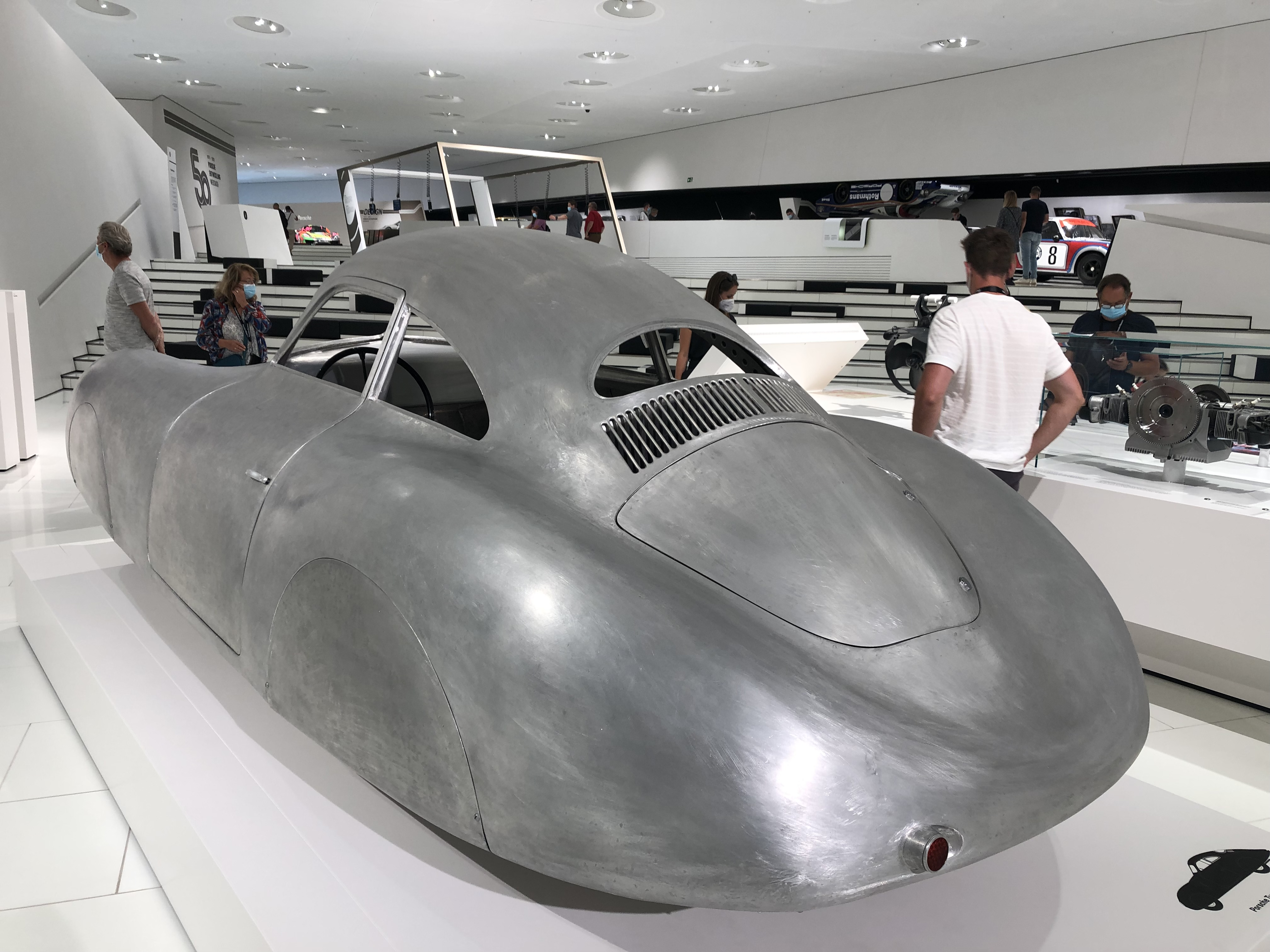

The Porsche 64, also known as the Type 64 and Type 60K10, is considered by many to be the first automobile from what was to become the Porsche company, and a true design precursor to the post-war production model.

== History ==
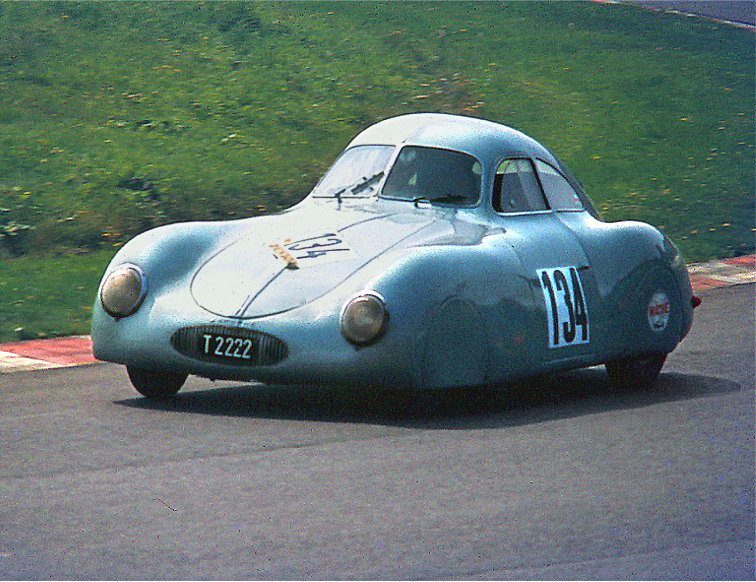
Porsche 64 racing in 1981

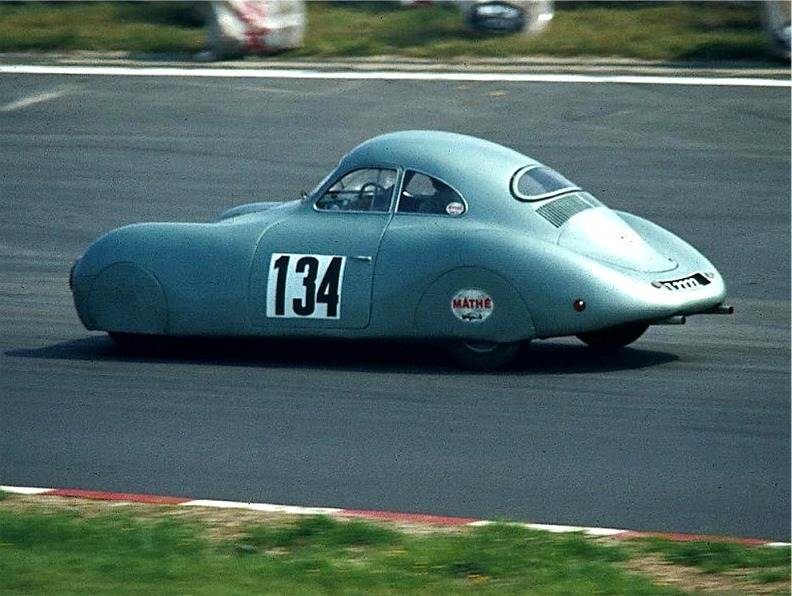
Porsche 64 racing in 1981

=== Name and origin ===
The model number comes from the fact that it was built mainly from design drawings for the Type-64 "record car". Most mechanical parts came from the VW 38, the prototype of the KdF-Wagen better known as the Volkswagen Beetle. The chassis was heavily reinforced and the engine also reworked to produce around 40 horsepower. The Type 64 was only a drawing until the three racers were built. The body was also a compromise in that the cab had to look like a KdF car, but the rest was 'record' car. The VW beetle was the Type 60, and the name the "60K10" means body design 10 for the Type 60 Beetle. Its flat-four engine produced between 32 and 40 bhp and gave a top speed of around 160 km/h (99 mph).

=== Planned races and scrapping ===
The body design was made by the Porsche Büro after wind tunnel tests for a planned V10 sports car that never came into existence, the Type 114. Dr. Ingr. Porsche promoted the idea to enter the car into the Berlin-Rome race scheduled for September 1939. The race did not take place but three cars were completed, with aluminium bodies hand shaped by the bodywork company Reutter (which also produced the VW 38 prototypes). One of these, the 38/41, was destroyed early in World War II. The two remaining cars, numbered 38/42 and 38/43, were used by the Porsche family. Eventually they only used one of them and put the other in storage.

=== Last examples ===
In May 1945, American troops discovered the one put in storage, cut the roof off and used it for joyriding for a few weeks until the engine gave up and it was scrapped. The last remaining Porsche 64 was owned by Ferry Porsche who had it restored by Battista Farina in 1947. In 1949 it was sold to the Austrian motorcycle racer Otto Mathé and with it he won the Alpine Rally in 1950. The last time he drove it in a race was at the Monterey Historic Automobile Races in Monterey, California, in 1982. The scrapped car, chassis 38/42, has also been rebuilt and is now on display in the Petersen Automotive Museum in Los Angeles.

Otto Mathé retained possession of 38/43 until his death in 1995, and two years later the Type 64 was sold for the second time in its history to Porsche collector and marque expert Dr. Thomas Gruber of Vienna, Austria. The 1939 Porsche Type 64 was to be auctioned in August 2019 during Monterey Car Week. RM Sotheby's predicted a selling price “in excess of $20 million” but it failed to sell at an auction marred by incorrectly displayed bid amounts.
