= MHP Management- und IT-Beratung =

Global consultancy

- Type: GmbH
- Industry: Professional Services
- Founded: May 2, 1996
- Founder: Lutz Mieschke; Ralf Hofmann
- Headquarters: Ludwigsburg, Germany
- Number of locations: Germany (9); Switzerland (1); Romania (2); United States (1); China (1); United Kingdom (1); India (1)
- Key people: Ralf Hofmann (Chairman/CEO); Marc Zimmermann (CFO)
- Services: IT/Process Consulting for Automotive
- Revenue: €600 million (2021)
- Owner: Tata Consultancy Services (100%)
- Number of employees: 4000+ (2023)
- Website: mhp.com

MHP Management- und IT-Beratung (MHP) is a global consultancy based in Ludwigsburg, Germany, specializing in IT and process consulting in the automotive and manufacturing sectors. Porsche has held an equity stake in the firm since 1999, starting at 49% and increasing over time to the current 100%. MHP has experienced sustained growth since its inception in 1996.

== History ==
The firm was initially established in May 1996 by Ralf Hofmann and Lutz Mieschke. The idea was to provide consulting services combining both business process optimization as well as IT services, with SAP software being the primary concentration of the IT services offering. In January 1999, Porsche AG began its equity investment at 49% and MHP became their primary IT service partner. At this point the company is known as "MHP - A Porsche Services Company". In March 2002, Porsche increased its stake to 51% and MHP became a subsidiary of Porsche AG. In June 2003, Porsche further increased its investment to 74.8% and once again in 2011 to 81.8% and in 2023 to 100%. CEO Dr.-Ing Hofmann sold the remaining 18.2% ownership stake to Porsche in 2023.

On 24th August 2026 Porsche announced the sale of MHP to Tata Consultancy Services.

== Services ==
The primary focus of consulting services is on the automotive industry (OEM's, suppliers, dealers and importers). Industry award-winning strategic innovations have been applied to clients in other industries.

At the international level MHP advises its clients both strategically and operationally.

== Locations ==
Clients are supported by more than 4000 employees at 19 offices in:

Germany

- Ludwigsburg (Headquarters, 2 locations)
  - Film- und Medienzentrum
  - Schlossgut Harteneck
- Stuttgart
- Walldorf
- Munich
- Nuremberg
- Düsseldorf
- Essen
- Wolfsburg
- Berlin
- Frankfurt am Main

(United States) United States
MHP Americas Inc.

- Auburn Hills - co-located at Volkswagen North America headquarters

Romania
MHP Consulting Romania SRL

- Cluj-Napoca
- Timișoara
- Bucureşti

(China) China
MHP (Shanghai) Management Consultancy Co. Ltd.

- Shanghai

(United Kingdom) United Kingdom
MHP Consulting UK Limited

- Reading

India
MHP India

- Bangalore

== Corporate social responsibility ==
For over a decade, MHP has sustainably supported social projects and facilities through its internal program MHPCares. Projects are in areas that have a direct relation to the employees or their families. Employees are encouraged to participate in several of these on a volunteer basis. Some examples include:

- Children's Cardiac Centre – “Olgäle Foundation” Stuttgart
- Ludwigsburger Schlossfestspiele
- MHP University Prize – a scholarship for Business Informatics students at Reutlingen University
- Formula Student Combustion “Green Team Stuttgart” engineering competition

== Sponsorships ==
In September 2012 MHP secured the 10-year naming rights for the Arena Ludwigsburg – now known as MHPArena. As of the 2013–14 season MHP is also the naming rights sponsor of the Basketball Bundesliga team MHP Riesen Ludwigsburg. On 1 July 2023, the football stadium of Bundesliga side VfB Stuttgart was renamed MHPArena.

Other sponsorships include:

- Match Race Germany at Lake Constance
- Ritz-Carlton Dragon Boat Cup
- RGH Heidelberg Rugby Youth Teams
