= Louise Piëch =

Austrian businesswoman

- Born: Louise Hedwig Anna Wilhelmine Maria Porsche; 29 August 1904; Vienna, Austria-Hungary
- Died: 10 February 1999 (aged 94); Zell am See, Salzburg, Austria
- Spouse: Anton Piëch (m. 1928; died 1952)
- Children: 4, including Ferdinand Piëch
- Parents: Ferdinand Porsche (father); Aloisia Johanna Kaes (mother)
- Relatives: Ferry Porsche (brother); Ferdinand Alexander Porsche (nephew); Wolfgang Porsche (nephew)
- Family: Porsche

Louise Hedwig Anna Wilhelmine Maria Piëch (née Porsche; 29 August 1904, in Vienna – 10 February 1999, in Zell am See) was an Austrian businesswoman and a member of the Porsche family. She was the daughter of automotive engineer Ferdinand Porsche and Aloisia Johanna Kaes, and the elder sister of Ferry Porsche.

In 1928, she married Anton Piëch, a Viennese lawyer who was legal adviser to the Porsche family and, from 1941 to 1945, one of the chief managers of the Volkswagen works at KdF-Stadt. The couple had four children: Ernst, Louise Daxer, Ferdinand Karl, and Hans-Michel.

== Early life ==
Louise Porsche was born in Vienna in 1904 as the first child of Ferdinand Porsche and Aloisia Johanna Kaes. Her younger brother Ferdinand Anton Ernst "Ferry" Porsche was born in 1909. According to Deutsche Biographie, she studied drawing and painting privately in Vienna with Josef Engelhart, and also took part successfully in motor races, reflecting the Porsche family's early involvement in automobiles.

== Porsche Konstruktionen and post-war business ==
In 1929, Piëch became a co-partner in her father's design office in Stuttgart. During the Second World War, the Porsche design office was relocated to Gmünd in Carinthia.

In October 1943, at Louise Piëch's initiative, the Austrian assets of Porsche KG Stuttgart were transferred to her and her husband Anton Piëch and incorporated into the newly founded Porsche Konstruktionen Ges.m.b.H., based in Gmünd. In 1947, Louise Piëch and Ferry Porsche formally established the Austrian company Porsche Konstruktionen GesmbH in Gmünd and served as its directors while their father was detained in France. The company soon received a commission from Italian industrialist Piero Dusio to develop the Cisitalia all-wheel-drive Formula One racing car; the proceeds from this contract helped the family post bail for Ferdinand Porsche.

In 1948, Ferdinand Porsche, Ferry Porsche, Louise Piëch, Anton Piëch and Volkswagen general director Heinrich Nordhoff signed a wide-ranging agreement with Volkswagen at Bad Reichenhall. The agreement included licence fees for each Volkswagen Beetle produced, permission to build a sports car based on the Beetle, sales through the Volkswagen network, technical-service arrangements, and the right to act as Volkswagen general importer in Austria. In 1949, Louise Piëch and Ferry Porsche moved the headquarters of Porsche Konstruktionen GesmbH from Gmünd to Salzburg, where Louise and Anton Piëch developed Volkswagen imports for the Austrian market, while Ferry Porsche returned to Stuttgart to develop what became Porsche AG.

== Leadership of Porsche Salzburg ==
After Ferdinand Porsche died in 1951 and Anton Piëch died unexpectedly in 1952, Louise Piëch took over management of the Salzburg-based company. At that time, the company had 71 employees and three locations: the Salzburg site on Alpenstraße, the branch in Gmünd and premises in Zell am See. Under her leadership, Porsche Salzburg developed from an import business into a broader automotive distribution and services company. Porsche Holding describes her as having established an Austria-wide Volkswagen distribution organisation and Porsche sports-car dealerships; the Volkswagen brand first reached Austrian market leadership under the company in the 1950s.

In the 1960s, the company expanded into related automotive services, including rental-car services in 1962 and leasing in 1966. In 1965, after Piëch approved the creation of a motorsport department at the Alpenstraße site, Porsche Salzburg became active in international motorsport. In 1970, a Porsche Salzburg Porsche 917 won the 1970 24 Hours of Le Mans, giving Porsche its first overall victory at the 24 Hours of Le Mans.

In 1971, Louise Piëch and Ferry Porsche withdrew family members from operational management in the Salzburg and Stuttgart companies and moved to supervisory roles. Porsche Newsroom describes Piëch as one of Austria's most successful businesswomen and as a major figure in the development of Porsche Salzburg, which later became one of Europe's largest automotive distribution companies.

== Personal life and death ==
Piëch was known within the Porsche family for her enthusiasm for fast cars, and Ferry Porsche gave her the first road-going Porsche 911 with a turbocharger, the 911 Turbo “No. 1”, for her 70th birthday in 1974. She also painted landscapes and was interested in hunting.

Louise Piëch died on 10 February 1999 in Zell am See, aged 94. She was buried in the private chapel at the Schüttgut estate in Zell am See, following Porsche family tradition.

== Honours ==
Piëch received several Austrian and German honours. According to Deutsche Biographie, she was appointed Kommerzialrätin in 1959, became an honorary senator of the Vienna University of Technology in 1976, received the Great Cross of Merit of the Federal Republic of Germany in 1979, the Ring of the City of Salzburg in 1984, and the Grand Decoration of Honour in Gold for Services to the Republic of Austria in 1994.
