= Porsche Mission S =

Concept sports car

Overview
- Manufacturer: Porsche
- Production: 2026
- Designer: Tobias Sühlmann

Body and chassis
- Class: Concept sports car
- Body style: 2-door coupé

The Porsche Mission S is a concept mid-engine sports car unveiled by Porsche on October 15th, 2026 in New York City. It is set to be developed as part of the company-wide strategic realignment called ‘Sportwagenschmiede ’35’. Currently the Mission S is intended to be a full-production car, sitting above the 911 as Porsche's flagship model, and not a limited / special edition.

It was unveiled at the same pier in Queens, New York where, in 1953, the 550 Spyder was first shown to the American public.

== Design ==
Both the exterior and interior design of the Mission S reportedly take inspiration from past Porsche models

- Front end was inspired by the 911 GT1
- Round headlights and "torpedo" fenders 911
- Rear roofline spoiler integration inspired by the 959
- "Phone dial" wheel rims design from the 928
- Aft engine radiator fan directly from the 917
- Paired down driver-focused interior inspired by the 550 Spyder and 356 - note the lack of any touchscreens.
