= Anton Piëch =

Austrian lawyer and car company manager (1894–1952)

- Born: 21 September 1894; Vienna, Austria-Hungary
- Died: 29 August 1952 (aged 57); Klagenfurt, Austria
- Education: University of Vienna
- Occupations: Lawyer, business executive
- Known for: Manager of Volkswagenwerk GmbH
- Spouse: Louise Porsche (m. 1928)
- Children: 4, including Ferdinand Piëch

Anton Piëch (German pronunciation: [ˈantoːn ˈpiːɛç]; 21 September 1894 – 29 August 1952) was an Austrian-German lawyer and the son-in-law of Ferdinand Porsche. He headed Volkswagenwerk GmbH between 1941 and 1945, which produced the Volkswagen vehicles (KdF-Wagen) at the factory in Wolfsburg, Germany.

== Biography ==
Piëch was born on 21 September 1894 in Vienna, the son of lawyer Anton Paul Piëch. He studied at the University of Vienna and received his doctorate of jurisprudence in 1922. He established himself as a lawyer in his hometown, where his clients included several Austrian Nazis, among others. At the end of the 1920s, he defended Ferdinand Porsche in litigation against Daimler-Benz over an employment contract. In 1928, Piëch married Louise Porsche, the daughter of Ferdinand. Together they had three sons, Ernst (born 1929), Ferdinand Karl (1937–2019), and Hans-Michel (born 1942), and a daughter, Louise (1932–2006).

Piëch had a 15% share in the founding of the Porsche company in Stuttgart on 25 April 1931. In the Kommanditgesellschaft founded in 1937 (Porsche KG), his share was 10%. Piëch represented the company in legal and contractual matters.

In May 1933, Piëch became a member of the then-illegal Austrian Nazi Party. In July 1937, months before the Anschluss, he joined the NSDAP of Nazi Germany. He joined the SS in 1944.

In June 1941, Piëch took over as plant manager at the plant where Volkswagen were produced in Wolfsburg. He succeeded Otto Dyckhoff as one of the managers of Volkswagenwerk GmbH, along with Ferdinand Porsche and Bodo Lafferentz, which decades later would become the current Volkswagen Group.

As Ferdinand Porsche's right-hand man, Piëch became involved in the adaptation of the Wolfsburg plant for the manufacture of weapons, like the V-1 flying bomb. Under his leadership, 20,000 forced laborers from Poland, the USSR, Italy, France, Belgium and the Netherlands worked in the plant, as well as German political prisoners, and from 1942 to 1945, Arbeitsdorf concentration camp prisoners. In total, they accounted for about two-thirds of the work force of the plant during World War II. According to some incomplete lists, some 500 prisoners of war, deportees, and concentration camp prisoners died in Wolfsburg. In Rühen, near the factory, an orphanage for babies of the forced laborers was built. At least 350 children died there, being separated from their mothers two weeks after birth so that they could return to work.

Piëch was also a factory leader of four companies of the Volkssturm, whose soldiers mostly kept in some kind of relationship with the factory. On 10 April 1945 he ordered his troops to withdraw towards the Elbe. Under the pretext of relocating the address of Volkswagenwerk GmbH to a safe place, he moved 10 million Reichsmark from Nejdek to Zell am See, where his family owned a farm. The money was supposed to be used for the relocation of a factory from Nejdek to Allgäu, but this never came to happen, and no funds ended up financing Porsche KG. After the war, due to the absence of a notice of dismissal, Piëch continued to serve as chief executive of Volkswagenwerk GmbH until November 1945. He used these final months to pay off bills of Porsche KG.

At the request of the French Minister of Justice Pierre-Henri Teitgen, Piëch was arrested in late 1945 in Baden-Baden together with Ferdinand Porsche and Ferry Porsche, following an invitation from French Minister of Industrial Production Marcel Paul. They were accused of forcibly transferring French workers to Wolfsburg, and organizing the deportation of executives of Peugeot to Nazi concentration camps during the German occupation of France. They were also held responsible for dismantling and moving Peugeot equipment and tools to the VW factory. Piëch and Ferdinand Porsche spent 22 months in French prisons. Ferdinand Porsche was ultimately absolved of responsibility by testimony made in court by many witnesses.

On 17 September 1948 in Bad Reichenhall, Piëch signed the agreement between Volkswagenwerk GmbH (under the leadership of new CEO Heinrich Nordhoff) and Porsche KG. As a result of the new treaty, Porsche was put in charge of the development activity of Volkswagen, as it occurred to date. Through license fees and representation rights paid by VW, financial foundation was laid for the new plant of Dr. Ing. h.c. F. Porsche AG.

In 1950, Piëch was manager of the Porsche Konstruktionen-GmbH in Salzburg, which was founded on 1 April 1947 in Gmünd in Kärnten, and of the "Volkswagen General Agency" in Austria, located in Salzburg, which later would become the Porsche Holding, currently the majority shareholder of Volkswagen Group.

On 29 August 1952, Anton Piëch died unexpectedly in Klagenfurt. His wife, Louise, became the director of business in Austria. He is buried in Zell am See.

== See also ==
- Porsche family
