= Porsche 114 =

Concept Car

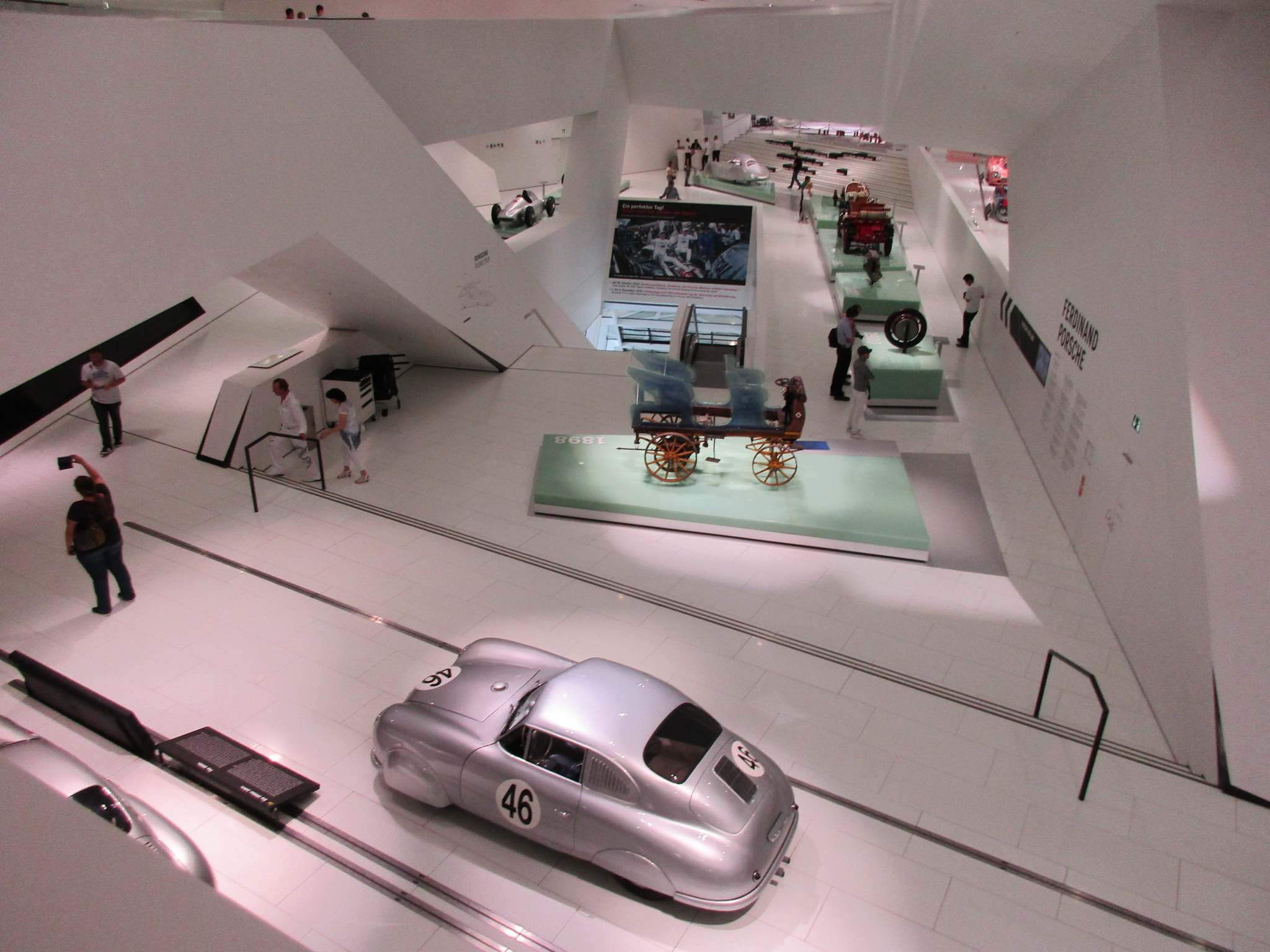

The Porsche 114 was a 1938 proposed design for a sports car powered by a 1493 cc V10 engine.

== History ==
After designing the Volkswagen for the German government's KDF program, Ferdinand Porsche considered building a sports car version of the VW. Internally known as the Porsche Type 64, this car would feature an aluminium streamlined body, a 1.5L version of the Volkswagen's original 1.0L engine, and a top speed of at least 160 km/h (100 mph). Originally, the car was to use a large number of VW parts, but due to the intricacies of then German law, it was not legal to sell government made parts to a private company.

== Design ==
By 1938, Ferdinand had given up trying to arrange for a supply of VW parts for the Type 64. Ferdinand and his son Ferry Porsche decided to redesign the car from the ground up to be built internally by Porsche. This would have been the first car actually built by Porsche themselves. Known as the Type 114, or F-Wagen, a sort of portmanteau of Ferry and P-Wagen, it was a significant departure from the Type 64. Although it never reached the prototype stage, the design drawings were all but completed and included a novel water cooled 72 BHP V10 twin camshaft engine in a true mid engine layout, as opposed to the VW's rear engine layout. Suspension was by trailing arms in front and swing axles in the rear, with drum brakes at all four corners. The body was aluminum and resembled a lower, stretched, and streamlined VW. Porsche had hopes of producing this car, but international tensions and a poor economy lead to its cancellation. Porsche did manage to salvage part of its investment by selling the transaxle design to Volkswagen.

== Legacy ==
The Porsche Type 114 never came to be, but it lived on in a number of Porsche cars. After World War II, Ferry Porsche began to build sports cars based on the VW, and eventually began production of the Porsche 356, which in concept was identical to the Type 64. Also, aerodynamic research for the 114 led to a series of bodies produced by Porsche for racing and land speed record cars, such as the Type 60K10, a highly modified VW Beetle. While the type 114 was in the end little more than a design study, it had a large impact on the future course of Porsche and the cars that would make the company a dominant force in the automotive world.
