= Michael Macht =

Michael Macht (born 28 August 1960) was the board of management member in charge of production with the German carmaker Volkswagen. Macht was formerly CEO of the management board at Porsche where he was appointed chairman of the Porsche AG and Porsche Automobil Holding executive board on 23 July 2009 and also served on the board of Porsche SE. Macht was succeeded at Porsche by Matthias Müller, who had previously been in charge of product strategy at VW.

On August 1, 2014, Macht resigned as group production chief and left Volkswagen. His resignation coincided with difficulties in implementing the modular production platform (MQB).

== Early life and career ==
Macht was born in Stuttgart, Germany on 28 August 1960. He studied mechanical engineering at the University of Stuttgart and then worked at the Fraunhofer Institute for Industrial Engineering, before joining Porsche in 1990, at first a specialist for engine planning. He later became assistant to the chairman of the management board, and in 1994 he was made managing director of Porsche Consulting. In 1998 he was appointed to the board of Porsche AG, responsible for production and logistics. Macht was also directly involved in the design of Porsche's most controversial models, the Cayenne and the Panamera. In July 2009 he was appointed chairman of the management board of Porsche AG, as successor to Wendelin Wiedeking.
