= Porsche (disambiguation) =

Porsche AG is an automobile manufacturer and a subsidiary of Volkswagen AG

Porsche may also refer to:

== Buildings ==
- Porsche Design Tower, in Sunny Isles Beach, Florida
- Porsche Museum, Stuttgart
- Porsche-Arena, in Stuttgart, Germany

== Companies and organizations ==
- Porsche Club Hohensyburg, an organization of Porsche enthusiasts in Germany
- Porsche Design Group, designer of consumer products, subsidiary of Porsche SE
- Porsche Engineering, design and engineering subsidiary of Porsche SE
- Porsche Holding, car distributor owned by Volkswagen AG
- Porsche Immobilien, a subsidiary of Porsche Holding responsible for car dealerships
- Porsche India, Indian car distribution subsidiary of Porsche AG
- Porsche SE, a German holding company that controls a group of companies, including Volkswagen AG

== Entertainment ==
- Porsche Challenge, a 1997 racing video game
- Porsche Unleashed, a racing video game
- "Porsche", a song by Charli XCX from Pop 2
- "Hey Porsche", a 2013 rap song

== People ==
- Ferdinand Alexander Porsche (1935–2012), German designer of the Porsche 911
- Ferdinand Porsche (1875–1951), founder of Porsche automobile manufacturer
- Ferry Porsche, one of the founders of Porsche Holding and son of Ferdinand Porsche
- Susanne Porsche (born 1952), German film producer
- Verandah Porche (born 1945), poet living in Guilford, Vermont
- Wolfgang Porsche (born 1943), German manager and a member of the Porsche family

== Sports ==
- Porsche in motorsport, racing activities of Porsche AG
- Porsche Junioren, Porsche AG racing driver development program
- Poznań Open, also called the Porsche Open, a tennis tournament
- Women's Stuttgart Open, also called the Porsche Tennis Grand Prix, a tennis tournament

== Vehicles ==
- Porsche Junior, a tractor manufactured by Porsche-Diesel from 1952 to 1963
- Porsche Panamera, a luxury four-door fastback
- Porsche Panamericana, an automobile produced by Porsche AG
- Porsche RS Spyder, a racing car designed by Porsche in conjunction with Penske
- Porsche Super, a tractor formerly manufactured by Porsche
- Porsche Tapiro, a 1970 concept car by Porsche
- Porsche type numbers, car model numbers
- Porsche VIN numbers, list of vehicle identification numbers

== Other ==
- Porsche girl, an event involving the online publication of photos of a gruesome car accident
- Porsche (surname), including a list of people with the surname

== See also ==
- Ferdinand A. Porsche (disambiguation)
- Porsha (disambiguation)
