= Porsche (surname) =

- Pronunciation: English: /pɔːrʃ/ German: [ˈpɔʁʃə]
- Language: German

Origin
- Origin: 1. Middle High German; 2. Slavic languages
- Derivation: 1. pors 2. Borislav
- Meaning: 1. 'marsh rosemary' 2. 'glory in the battle'

Porsche is a German surname, well known with its connection to the car company of the same name.

- Ferdinand Porsche (1875–1951), founder of design office that made cars, Dr. Ing. h.c. F. Porsche GmbH
- Ferdinand Alexander Porsche ("Butzi") (1935–2012), car designer, son of Ferdinand Anton Ernst Porsche
- Ferdinand Anton Ernst Porsche (or Ferry Porsche) (1909–1998), automotive engineer and designer, son of Ferdinand Porsche
- Louise Piëch (née Louise Porsche) (1904–1999), daughter of Ferdinand Porsche, mother of Ferdinand Piëch
- Gertrude Porsche-Schinkeová (1910–?), German-Czechoslovak luger
- Susanne Porsche (or Susanne Bresser) (born 1952), German film producer

== See also ==
- Porsche family tree
