= Ferdinand Porsche (disambiguation) =

Ferdinand Porsche (1875–1951) was an automotive engineer and founder of the Porsche car company.

Ferdinand Porsche may also refer to:

- Ferdinand Anton Ernst Porsche (1909–1998), known as Ferry, automobile designer and businessman, son of Ferdinand Porsche, Sr.
- Ferdinand Alexander Porsche (1935–2012), nicknamed Butzi, automobile designer, creator of the Porsche 911, son of Ferry Porsche

== See also ==
- Porsche family
- Ferdinand (disambiguation)
- Porsche (disambiguation)
