= Porsche Holding =

German automotive company, a subsidiary of Volkswagen

Porsche Holding GmbH
- Type: Subsidiary (GmbH)
- Industry: Automotive
- Founded: Salzburg, Austria (1949)
- Founder: Louise Piëch, Ferry Porsche
- Headquarters: Salzburg, Austria
- Area served: Worldwide
- Key people: Hans Peter Schützinger (CEO), Rainer Schroll, Johannes Sieberer,
- Services: Automobile distribution and financial services
- Owner: Volkswagen AG (100%)
- Number of employees: 35,900
- Parent: Volkswagen AG
- Subsidiaries: Porsche Informatik, Porsche Bank, Porsche Inter Auto, Porsche Immobilien
- Website: www.porsche-holding.com

Porsche Holding GmbH, also known as Porsche Holding Salzburg, is the largest car distributor in Europe. In 2011, the company was sold by the Porsche family and Porsche SE to Volkswagen AG, which is the majority owner of the company.

== History ==
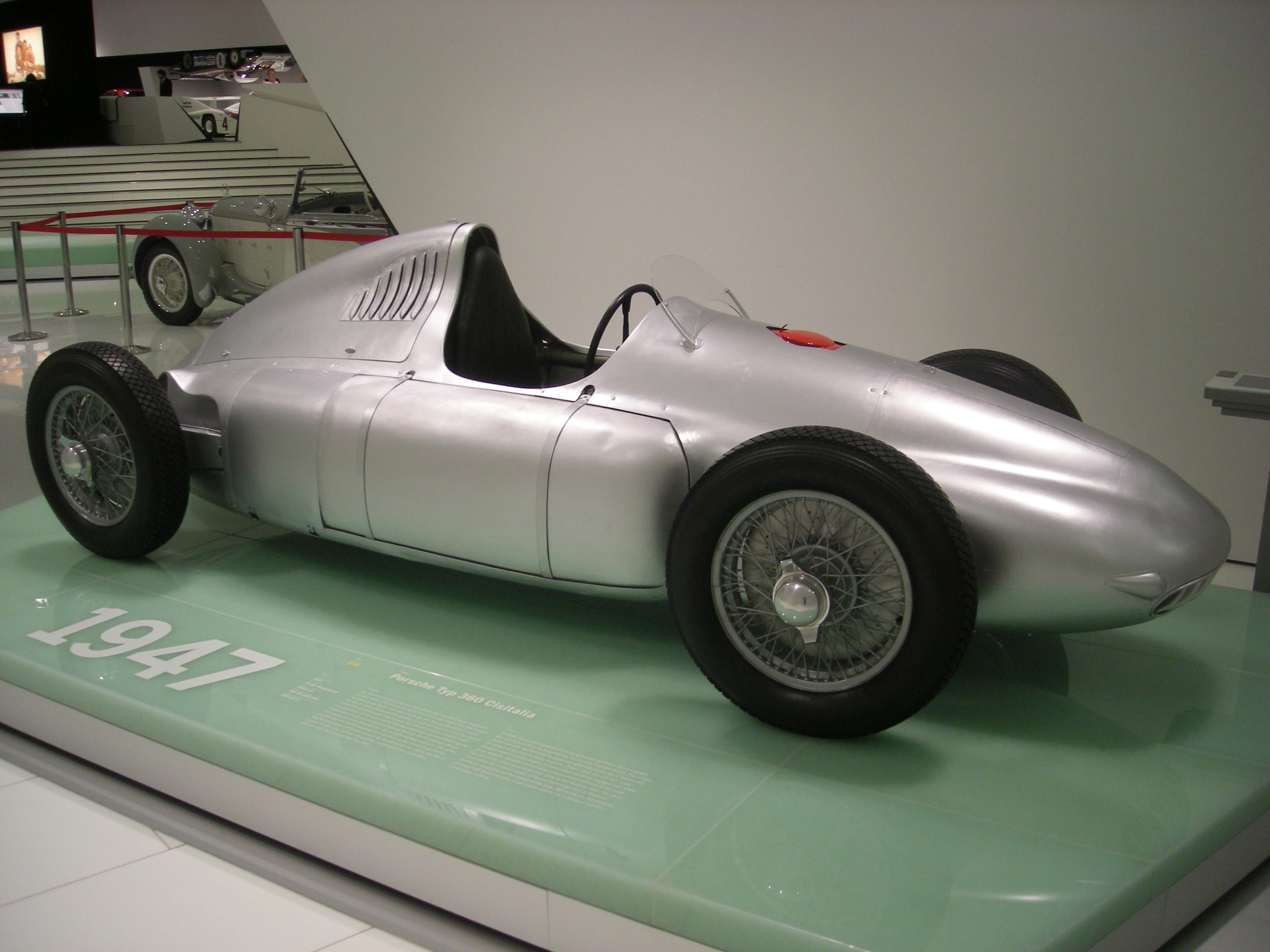
Porsche 360 Cisitalia

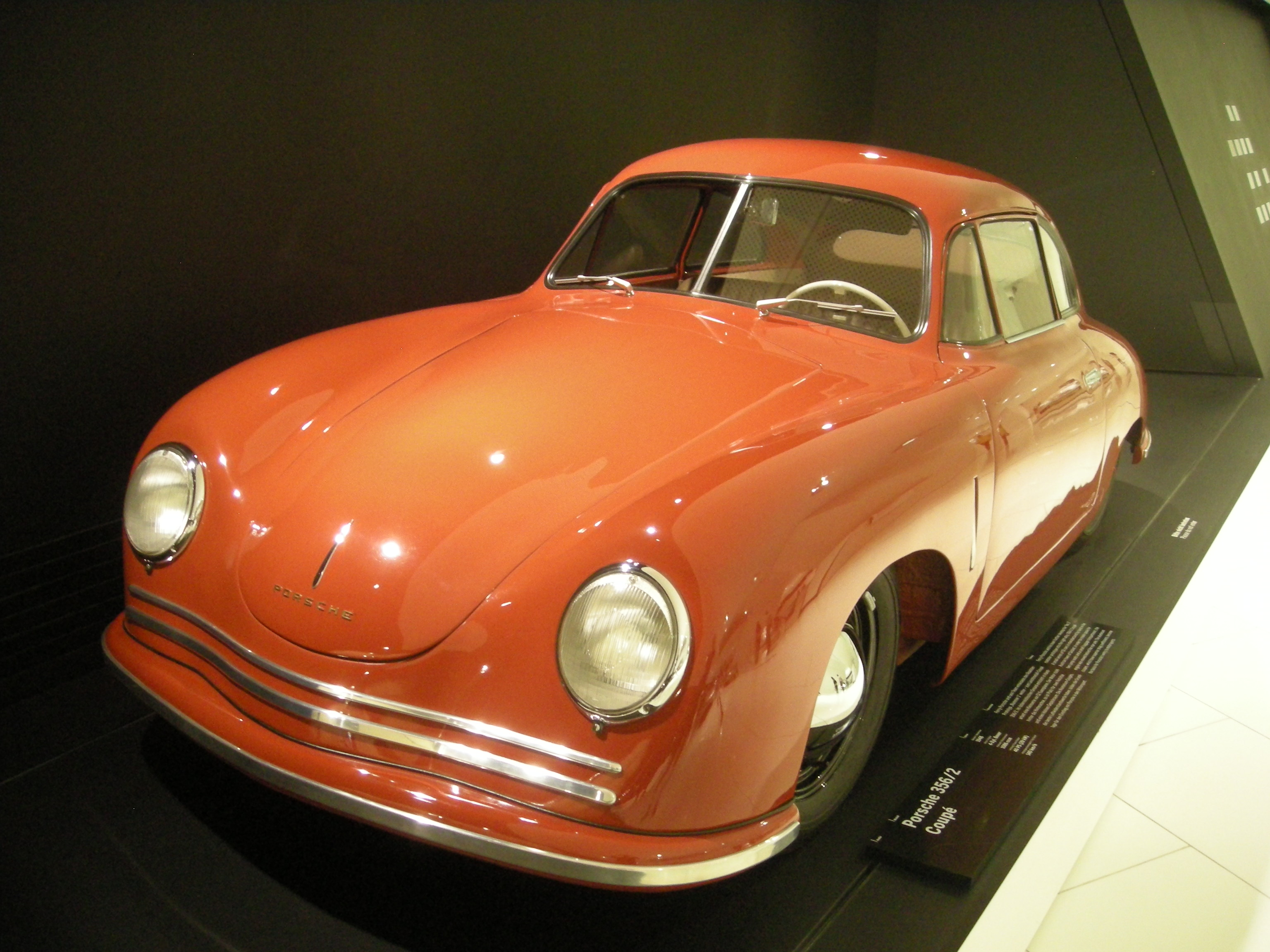
Porsche 356/2, the first rear-engined Porsche 356

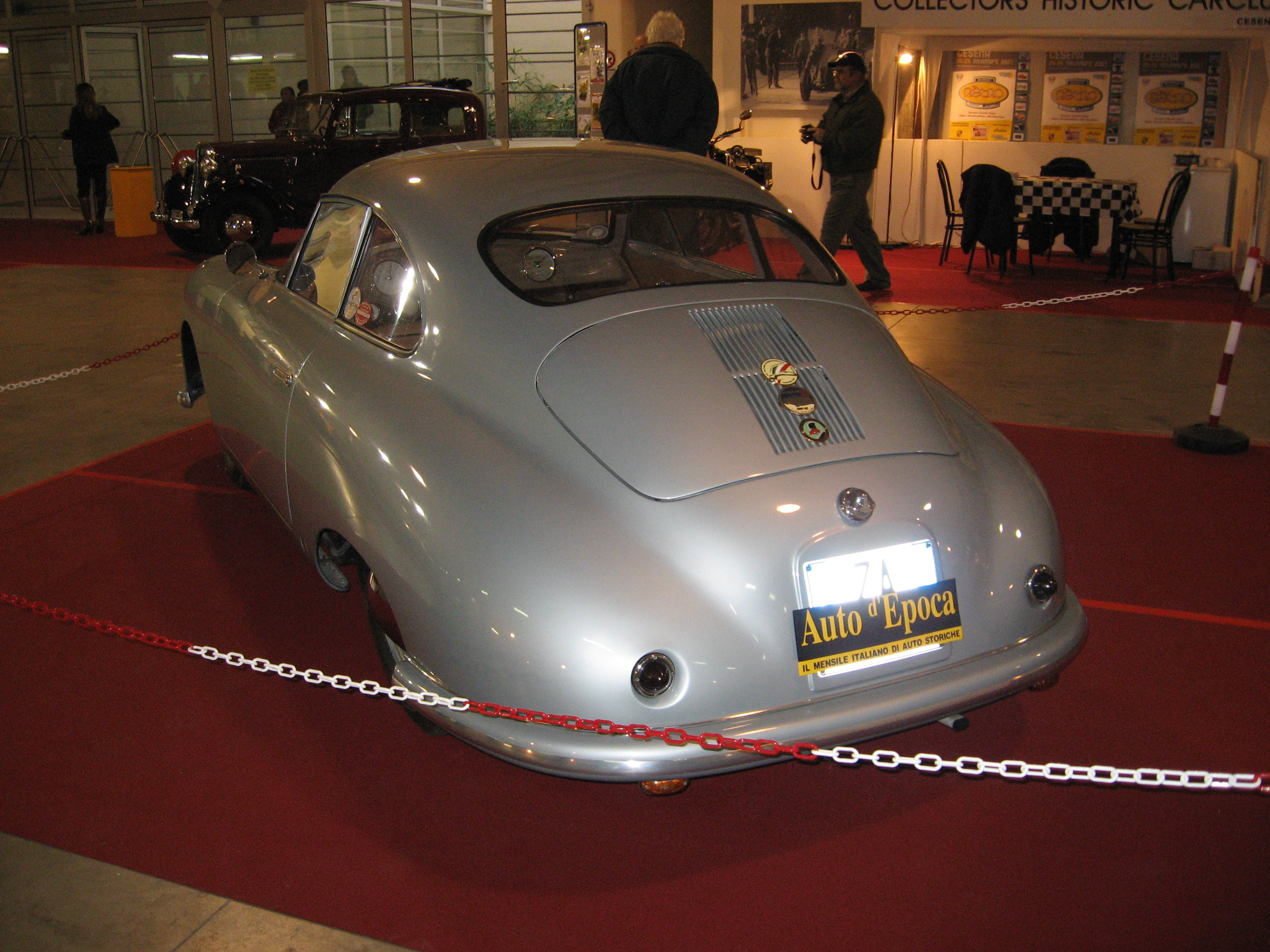
Aluminium bodied 1948 Porsche 356 made in Gmünd

Porsche Konstruktionen GesmbH was founded by Louise Piëch and Ferry Porsche (daughter and son of Ferdinand Porsche) in 1947 in Gmünd, Austria. After the Porsche 360 Grand Prix racing car was designed by Ferry Porsche with help from the engineers of his father's design office for Cisitalia in 1947, the company started manufacturing the Porsche 356, starting with the prototype Porsche 356/1 and then 356/2 in 1948 at a factory located at a saw mill in Gmünd, and later at a factory in Salzburg.

After Ferdinand Porsche was released from a French prison after the war, the production of the Porsche 356 was taken over by Dr. Ing. h.c. F. Porsche GmbH in Stuttgart, Germany, and the facility in Salzburg became home to Porsche Konstruktionen as the Austrian importer of Volkswagen and Porsche products in 1949. Ferry Porsche joined his father's company in Stuttgart, while the Austrian operation was left with Anton Piëch and Louise Piëch, who managed it to become the largest car dealership chain in Austria by 1957.

By the 1960s, Porsche Konstruktionen became one of the largest distributors of Volkswagen and Porsche products in Europe.

== Motorsport ==
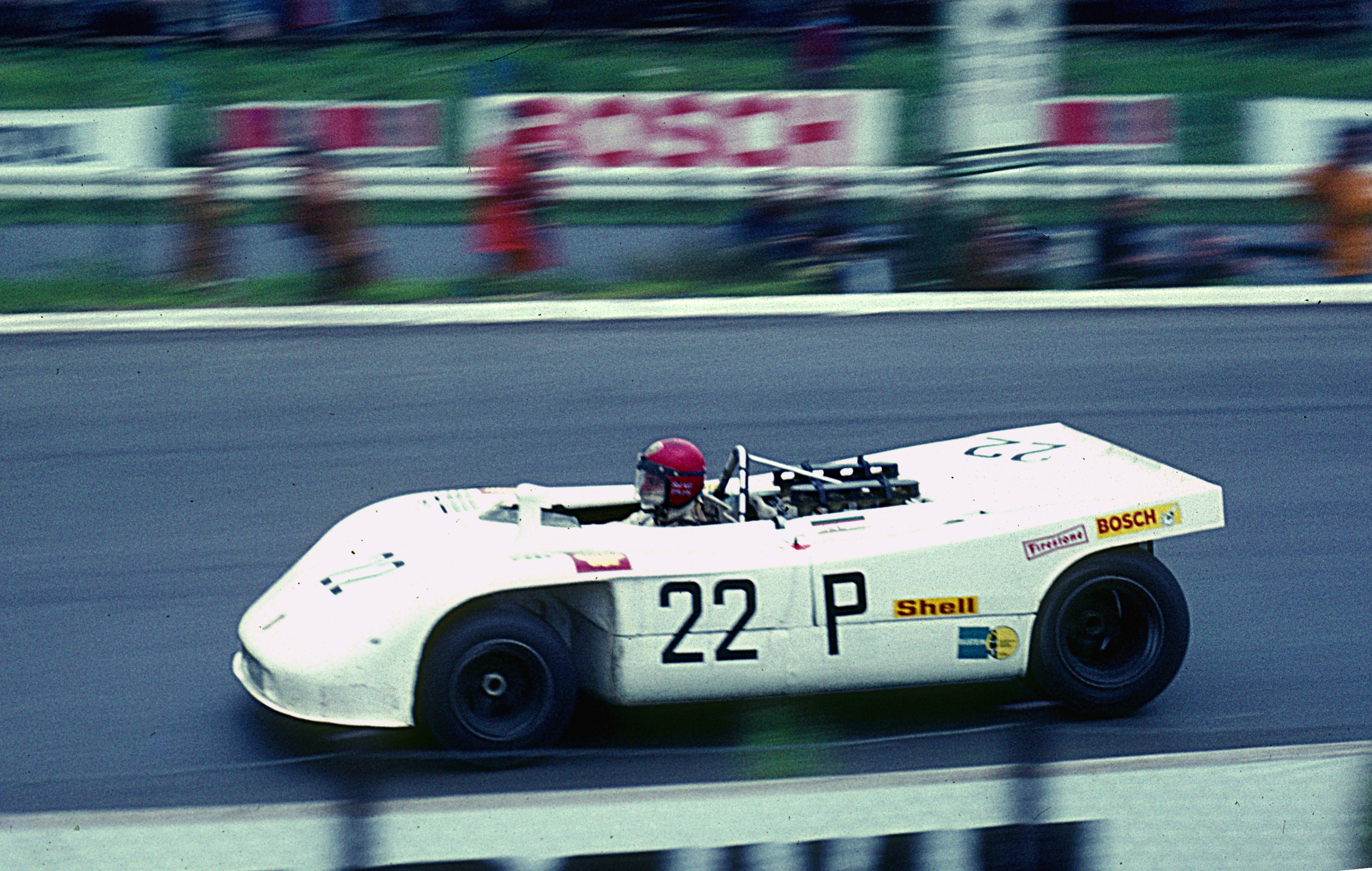
Porsche 908/03 of Vic Elford/Kurt Ahrens Jr., winner of the 1970 1000km Nürburgring, entered by Porsche Salzburg

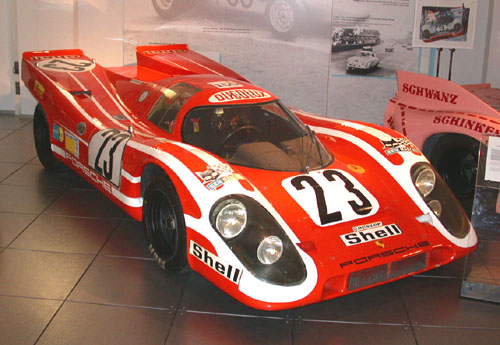
Porsche 917 Kurzheck 4.5L of Hans Herrmann/Richard Attwood, winner of 1970 24 Hours of Le Mans, entered by Porsche Salzburg

In the late 1960s, Porsche entered many sports cars in races, and to support the factory effort (then calling itself Porsche System Engineering), external semi-factory teams were set up to share the work load. In the 1969 World Sportscar Championship season, Porsche Salzburg became such a de facto second works team, sponsored by Porsche Konstruktionen. Early in the season, at the Nürburgring 1000 km, cars were entered as Salzburg Porsche Konstruktionen, but later at Austria's Österreichring, it became Porsche Salzburg for short. In the USA races, and in 1969 Can-Am, the Porsche 917PA of Jo Siffert was entered as Porsche Audi Division, the North American dealer organisation for both brands.

For homologation in April 1969, 25 Porsche 917 had been built, but barely tested. In addition to the Porsche 908 coupés raced in 1968, updated open top Porsche 908/02 were built, and no less than six of these were entered by Porsche System Engineering at the 1969 Targa Florio. More than enough cars were at hand, the limiting factor were resources, money, personnel, experienced driver combinations. The factory needed to concentrate on developing cars, while partners were needed for testing and racing all over the world.

For the 1970 World Sportscar Championship season, the Gulf-sponsored JWA team of John Wyer was the designated factory partner, representing Porsche in motorsport. Already in late 1969 they helped to develop the 917K. The Porsche factory itself did not compete anymore, focussing on development, but Porsche Salzburg continued, still receiving factory support as Ferdinand Piech wanted to put additional eggs in other baskets. He also wanted to race the long tail 917L at the 1970 24 Hours of Le Mans after the 1969 race was disappointing both for the 917L and the 908L. Wyer preferred the 917K, though, but Salzburg took one.

To a lesser degree, Hans-Dieter Dechent and his Martini Racing team was supported also in 1970, mainly with loaning the "hippie" 917L for Le Mans that finished second. Usually two cars were entered by Salzburg, with leading drivers Vic Elford and Hans Herrmann getting supported by others. Salzburg operated the winning Porsche 908/03 (Elford/Ahrens) in the 1970 1000 km of Nürburgring, and the winning Porsche 917K (Herrmann/Attwood) at the 1970 24 Hours of Le Mans. With FErarai winnign at

After 1970, the name of Porsche Salzburg disappeared from entry lists, as the second factory-backed team besides Wyer in the 1971 World Sportscar Championship season was merged with Martini Racing. The Martini entries won Sebring, where Ferrari had won in 1970, and again both Nürburgring and Le Mans. Alfa won two events, JWA five.

== Recent developments ==
In January 2009, Porsche SE became the largest shareholder of Volkswagen AG, and in March 2011, Porsche SE as well as the Porsche and Piëch families sold the ownership in the Austrian company, which had been reorganized into Porsche Holding GmbH (Porsche Holding Salzburg), to Volkswagen AG.

Today, Porsche Holding Salzburg is the largest car distributor in Europe, representing Volkswagen Group brands, including Porsche, in wholesale (as importer), retail (through its dealers), and in the after-sales business (service) in 21 countries in Europe, as well as in South America and in China.

== See also ==
- Porsche (disambiguation)
