= Porsche SE =

German holding company

Porsche Automobil Holding SE

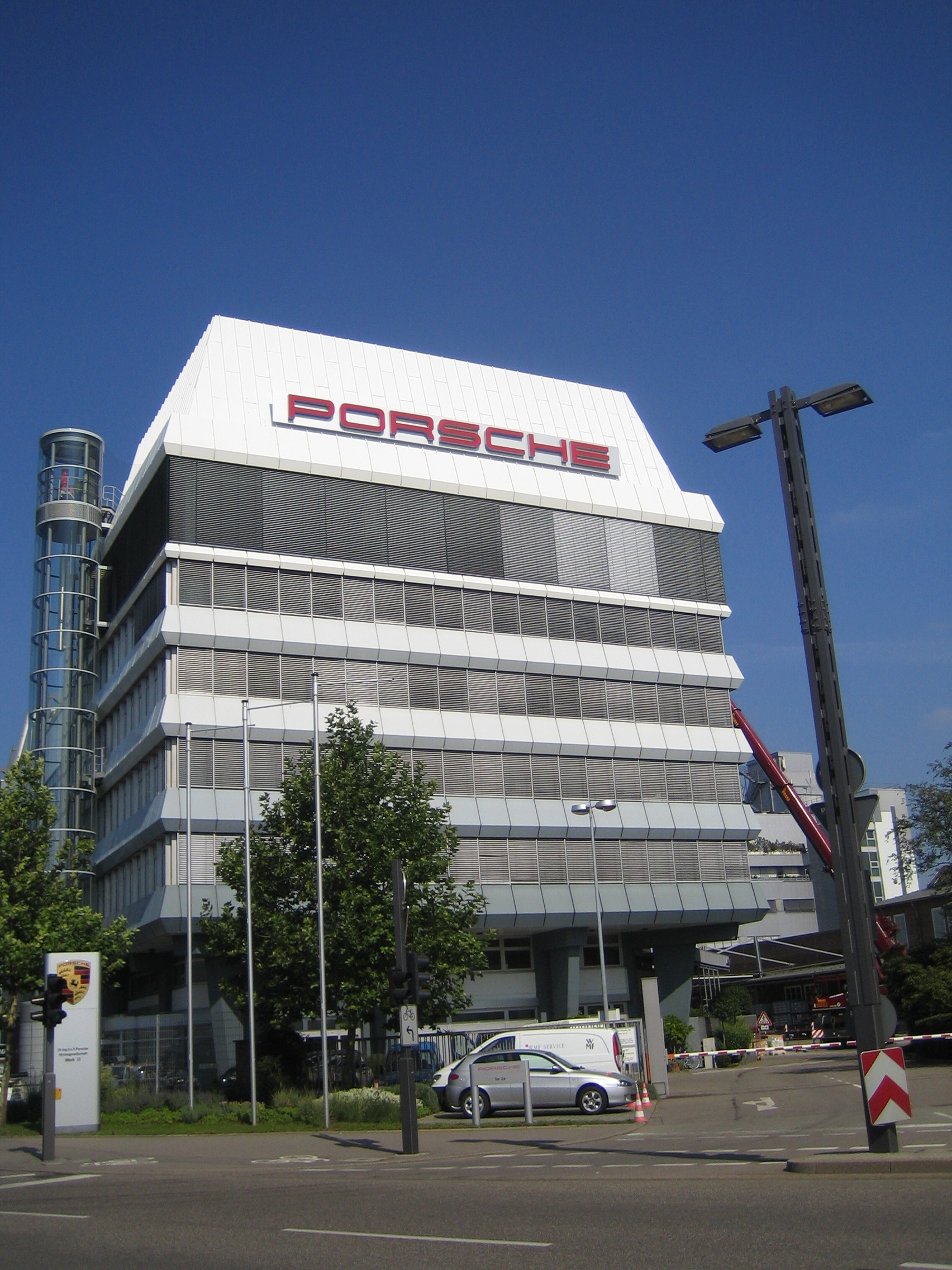
- Porsche headquarters in Stuttgart, Germany
- Trade name: Porsche SE
- Formerly: Dr. Ing. h.c. F. Porsche GmbH (1931–1972); Dr. Ing. h.c. F. Porsche AG (1972–2007)
- Type: Public (Societas Europaea)
- Traded as: FWB: PAH3; DAX component
- ISIN: DE000PAH0038
- Industry: Holding company
- Founded: 1931; 95 years ago
- Founder: Ferdinand Porsche
- Headquarters: Stuttgart, Germany
- Area served: Worldwide
- Key people: Wolfgang Porsche (chairman of the supervisory board); Hans Dieter Pötsch (chairman of the executive board)
- Services: Automotive financial services, engineering services, investment management
- Revenue: 116,000,000 euro (2021)
- Operating income: 5,412,000,000 euro (2023)
- Net income: ▲€824 million (2021)
- Total assets: ▲€42.533 billion (2021)
- Total equity: ▲€42.196 billion (2021)
- Owner: Porsche–Piëch family (50% of equity, 100% of voting power) (Note: There are two classes of Porsche Automobil Holding SE shares. Half is ordinary shares with voting power, and the other half is preferred shares without voting power. The Porsche–Piëch family owns 100% of the ordinary shares as of the end of 2013. The preferred shares, which are not owned by the family, are traded publicly.)
- Number of employees: 53 (2024)
- Subsidiaries: Volkswagen Group (31.9% of equity, 53.3% of voting power); Porsche AG (12.5% of equity, 25% of voting power)
- Website: porsche-se.com

Porsche Automobil Holding SE, trading as Porsche SE, (Note: German pronunciation: [ˈpɔʁʃə]) is a German multinational corporation primarily known as a holding company of Volkswagen Group with investments in the automotive industry. Porsche SE is headquartered in Zuffenhausen, a city district of Stuttgart, Baden-Württemberg, and is majority owned by the Austrian-German Porsche–Piëch family. The company was founded in Stuttgart as Dr. Ing. h.c. F. Porsche GmbH in 1931 by Ferdinand Porsche (1875–1951) and his son-in-law Anton Piëch (1894–1952).

== Corporate structure ==
Porsche SE was created in June 2007 by renaming the old Dr. Ing. h.c. F. Porsche AG, and became a holding company for the families' stake in Porsche Zwischenholding GmbH (50.1%) (which in turn held 100% of the old Porsche AG) and currently is the major shareholder in Volkswagen AG (31.3%) and holds the majority voting rights (53.1%). At the same time, the new Dr. Ing. h.c. F. Porsche AG (which stands for Doktor-Ingenieur honoris causa Ferdinand Porsche Aktiengesellschaft), usually shortened to Porsche AG, was created for the car manufacturing business.

In August 2009, Porsche SE and Volkswagen AG reached an agreement that the car manufacturing operations of the two companies would merge in 2011, to form an "Integrated Automotive Group". The management of Volkswagen AG agreed to 50.7% of Volkswagen AG being controlled by Porsche SE in return for Volkswagen AG management taking Porsche SE management positions (in order for Volkswagen management to remain in control), and for Volkswagen AG acquiring ownership of Porsche AG.

As of 2024, the 31.9% stake in Volkswagen AG and 12.5% stake in Porsche AG are the predominant investments by Porsche SE, and Volkswagen AG in turn controls brands and companies such as Volkswagen, Audi, SEAT, Škoda, Bentley, Bugatti, Lamborghini, Porsche, Ducati, Volkswagen Commercial Vehicles, Scania, MAN, as well as Volkswagen Financial Services.

Josef Michael Ahorner, Stefan Piëch and Peter Daniell Porsche, are members of board of directors of Porsche Automobil Holding along with Wolfgang Porsche, Hans Michel Piëch, Ferdinand Oliver Porsche and Hans-Peter Porsche.

=== Subsidiaries ===
In addition to its subsidiaries Volkswagen Group and Porsche AG, Porsche SE maintains a diversified portfolio of further corporate investments, including a 35.5% stake in PTV Group, an 11.3% stake in the American traffic information provider INRIX, and a 3% stake in Isar Aerospace.

== History ==
=== EU and the Volkswagen Law ===
Volkswagen and its principal factory (with the newly built town that hosted it, called Wolfsburg today) were designed by Ferdinand Porsche and his design office, and the factory with supporting town facilities were established by the German government then led by the National Socialist (Nazi) Party in 1937–1938. When the government-owned Volkswagenwerk GmbH was privatized in 1960 into Volkswagen AG (VW AG), the German parliament enacted the law known as Volkswagen Law to govern the privatization process. In order to maintain government control in the privately owned company, the law stipulated that the votes on major shareholder meeting resolutions would require 4/5th (80%) agreement. This effectively gave any shareholder with more than 20% ownership (the government of Lower Saxony held 20.1%) a veto of any resolution that is proposed. This not only secured government control, but also prevented the possibility of a hostile takeover in the future.

When the European Union was founded in 1993, a European Union law was signed with the principle of promoting free movement of goods, people and capital within the Union. It became somewhat clear that the anti-takeover measure (the 80% agreement requirement) in Volkswagen Law would violate the European company law (as a part of the EU law), and it was feared that suitors would eventually be able to take over Volkswagen AG, as amendments to the German law and the bylaws of VW AG were seen to be likely.

In late 2005, Porsche took an 18.65% stake in the Volkswagen Group, further cementing their relationship, and preventing a takeover of Volkswagen Group, which was rumoured at the time. Hypothetical suitors included DaimlerChrysler AG, BMW, and Renault. As of June 2006, the Porsche AG stake in VW AG had risen to 25.1%, giving Porsche the veto rights along with the government.

On 26 March 2007, amidst the rumours that hedge funds were trying to take over VW AG with the intent to dismantle and dispense the components of Volkswagen Group, Porsche took its holding of Volkswagen AG shares to 30.9%, triggering a takeover bid under German law which required other shareholders to be given the opportunity to sell the shares at least at the price paid by the new major shareholder. Porsche then formally announced in a press statement that it did not intend to take over Volkswagen Group (it would set its bid price at the lowest possible legal value) but intended to move to avoid a competitor taking a large stake. Porsche's move came after the European Union announced that it intends to take steps against the Volkswagen Law.

In October 2007, the European Court of Justice ruled against the law, potentially paving the way for a takeover.

On 16 September 2008, Porsche increased its holdings to 35.14%, in effect almost taking control of the company, with more than 35% of the voting rights. It again triggered a takeover bid, but this time over Audi AG. Porsche dismissed the bid as a mere formality, since it was Porsche's intention to keep the corporate structure of the Volkswagen Group.

In October 2008, Porsche SE announced its intent to raise its stake in Volkswagen AG to 75% during 2009, and on 7 January 2009, Porsche SE's holding in VW AG was raised to 50.76%. At 75% ownership level, Porsche SE would have been able to bring VW AG's cash position onto Porsche SE books. Porsche's move automatically triggered a bid for Scania AB, because VW AG already had a controlling position in the Swedish truck-maker. As Porsche had no strategic interest in Scania, they offered the minimum price in that mandatory takeover bid on 19 January 2009. There has been some tension and anxiety among the VW AG management and the workers, who feared that Porsche might replace the management after the takeover, and it may signify a hardened production efficiency control, rejection of demands for pay rises or even personnel cuts. Ferdinand Piëch (Chairman of VW AG) and his cousin, Wolfgang Porsche (Chairman of Porsche SE), also seemed to be on a collision course.

However, on 13 August 2009, Scania was bought in totality, and Volkswagen AG's supervisory board signed the agreement to create an "integrated automotive group" with Porsche AG, led by Volkswagen AG. Volkswagen would initially take a 49.9 percent stake in Porsche AG by the end of 2009, and it would also see the Porsche–Piëch family shareholders selling the VW distributor ownership of Porsche Holding Salzburg to Volkswagen AG, which is the largest car distributor in Europe.

On 5 July 2012, Volkswagen AG announced a deal with Porsche SE, resulting in VW's full ownership of Porsche AG on 1 August 2012. The deal was classified as a restructuring rather than a takeover due to the transfer of a single share as part of the deal. Volkswagen AG paid Porsche AG shareholders $5.61 billion for the remaining 50.1% it did not own. The families later used the amounts they received for Porsche AG and the dealership shares to buy back the Porsche SE shares from Qatar Investment Authority as described in the following section.

In October 2013, the EU Court of Justice ruled that a redraft of the Volkswagen law "complied in full" with EU rules, bringing "the matter to a close," as the 80% agreement requirement was taken off. This officially made Porsche SE the controlling owner of Volkswagen AG.

=== Corporate restructuring ===
Porsche reformed the company's structure, with Dr. Ing. h. c. F. Porsche AG becoming a holding company, renamed "Porsche Automobil Holding SE", and a new Dr. Ing. h. c. F. Porsche AG operating company being formed in 2007. Thus the operating activities are separated from holding activities of the company. There was an Extraordinary General Meeting for Porsche AG shareholders which took place on 26 June 2007, at the Porsche Arena in Stuttgart, Germany to discuss the change to the company structure.

By March 2009, Porsche SE was aiming for its first ever credit ratings from U.S. rating agencies Standard & Poor's and Moody's.

In its process to acquire a majority holding in Volkswagen AG, Porsche SE built up a large debt burden, aggravated by taxes due on very large paper profits on Volkswagen AG options. By July 2009, Porsche SE was faced with debts exceeding 10 billion euros. The supervisory board of Porsche SE finally agreed to a number of arrangements whereby the Qatar Investment Authority would inject a large amount of capital into Porsche SE, and Porsche automobile manufacturing business would be merged with Volkswagen Group. On 23 July 2009, Michael Macht was appointed CEO of Porsche AG, to replace Wendelin Wiedeking, who was expected to receive a compensation package of 50 million euros.

In July 2010, Porsche AG appointed Volkswagen executive Matthias Müller to its new CEO position, moving Michael Macht to another executive position within Volkswagen AG.

In July 2012, it was announced that Volkswagen AG was taking over the Porsche AG automotive company completely, which bears the same name, but is only a subsidiary of Porsche SE. In June 2013, Qatar Holdings, through the Qatar Investment Authority, sold its 10% holding in Porsche SE back to the founding Porsche–Piëch family, giving them 100% voting rights in the holding company. Porsche SE currently owns 50.73% of the voting rights in Volkswagen AG as the largest (controlling) shareholder.

=== Spin-off of Porsche AG ===
On 29 September 2022, preferred shares of the operating company Dr Ing. h. c. F. Porsche AG began trading on the Frankfurt Stock Exchange (FWB: P911). The shares ended trading on their opening day at €84, valuing the company at €76 billion. Porsche AG has 455.5 million ordinary and preferred shares each. In the listing process, Volkswagen Group sold 25% + 1 of the ordinary shares of Porsche AG to the holding company Porsche SE, representing 12.5% direct ownership (exclusive of Porsche SE's indirect interest through its holdings in Volkswagen Group). The Qatar Investment Authority, which is the third-largest shareholder in Volkswagen Group, purchased slightly less than 5% of the listed preferred shares, giving the Qatari sovereign wealth fund direct ownership of slightly less than 2.5% of Porsche AG. As a result, for the first time in a decade, Porsche SE and the Porsche–Piëch family held direct ownership over their namesake brand.

In March 2025, Porsche SE being the largest shareholder of Volkswagen, is not considering selling its voting shares, contradicting a report by German tabloid, Bild. The report suggested that Porsche and Piëch families were exploring ideas of selling some Volkswagen shares to raise capital for other investments, potentially reducing their stake from 53.3% to 45%-50%. This could generate between €1.07 billion and €2.69 billion. But statements from Porsche indicates no such plans were made and emphasized their long-term commitment to Volkswagen.
