= Porsche family =

Austrian–German family

- Business family
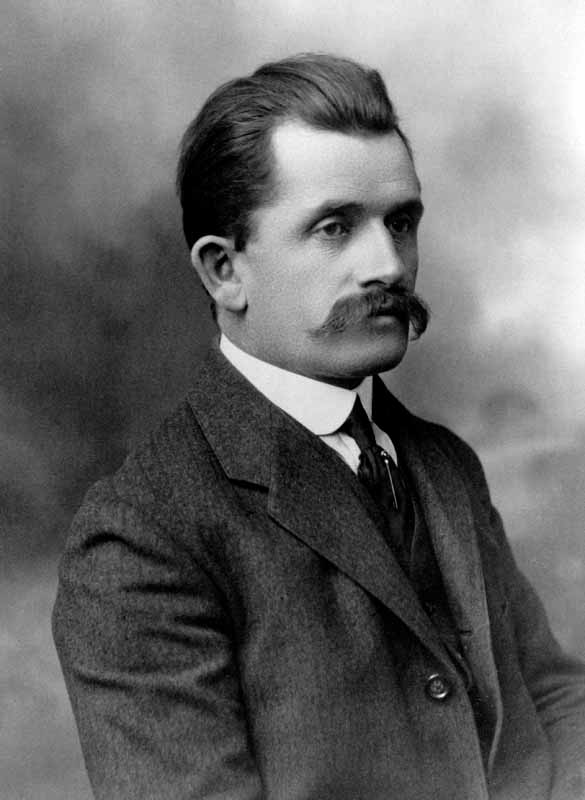
- Ferdinand Porsche, the founder and namesake of Porsche and patriarch of the Porsche family
- Origin: Reichenberg, Kingdom of Bohemia
- Current regions: Salzburg, Austria; Stuttgart, Germany
- Founded: 18th century
- Current head: Wolfgang Porsche
- Estate: Schüttgut
- Website: www.porsche-se.com/en/

The Porsche family (also known as Porsche–Piëch family) is a prominent Austrian-German family of industrialists descending from the Austrian-Bohemian-German automotive pioneer, Ferdinand Porsche. Its members control Porsche SE and have a majority voting right over Volkswagen AG, one of the largest automakers in the world. The Porsche family headquarters are in the Austrian town of Zell am See. The family is the seventh richest family of Germany (2022) with an estimated net worth of 22.5 billion euros.

== Founder ==
Ferdinand Porsche was born to a German-speaking family of Maffersdorf, Bohemia, son of Anton Porsche (1845–1908) and Anna Ehrlich.

== Porsche name ==
The Sudeten German surname Porsche can be traced to the 18th century in the area of Reichenberg, Bohemia (now Liberec, Czech Republic). The surname originates with the German word Bursche ("boy, young man, apprentice, farmhand") and is on record in northern Bohemia in various spellings (Porsch, Borsche, Borsch, Bursche, Bursch, Pursch, Pursche, etc.) from the early 17th century.

== Family trees ==
=== Ancestry of Ferdinand Porsche ===
Godifridus Porsche (1700–?)
Johannes Josef Porsche (1730–?)
Maria Magdalena Porsche (1762–?)	Wencelaus Porsche (1750–1808)
Maria Magdalena Porsche (1768–?)	Johann Joseph Gottfried Porsche (1773–?)	Anna Dorothea Porsche (1775–?)	Magdalena Gruner (1784–1843)	Antonius Porsche (1778–1843)
Joseph Porsche (1817–?)	Anton Porsche (1818–?)	Catharina Bradka (1819–1888)	Ferdinand Porsche (1820–1896)	Florian Porsche (1822–?)	Helena Porsche (1824–?)
Ferdinand Carl Porsche (1843–?)	Anna Ehrlich (1850–1919)	Antonius Porsche (1845–1908)	Caroline Porsche (1847–?)	Karl Porsche (1850–1852)	Maria Porsche (1855–?)	Anna Catharina Porsche (1861–?)
Karl Franz Ungermann (1865–?)	Anna Maria Porsche (1871–1943)	Antonius Ferdinandus Porsche (1873–1888)	Aloisia Johanna Kaes (1878–1959)	Ferdinand Porsche (1875–1951)	Antonius Josefus Wenzeslaus Porsche (1873–1940)	Hedwig Porsche (1878–1949)	Oscar Porsche (1881–1941)	Hermine Schier (1885–1968)
Anna Ungermann (1894)	Hedwig Aloisia Anna Porsche (1900–?)	Hermine Louise Porsche (1908–1992)

=== Porsche descendants of Ferdinand ===
Aloisia Johanna Kaes (1878–1959)	Ferdinand Porsche (1875–1951)
Anton Piëch (1894–1952)	Louise Hedwig Anna Wilhelmine Maria Porsche (1904–1999)	Ferdinand Anton Ernst Porsche (1909–1998)	Dorothea Reitz (1911–1985)
Ernst Piëch (b. 1929)	Louise Piëch (1932–2006)	Ferdinand Karl Piëch (1937–2019)	Hans-Michel Piëch (b. 1942)	Ferdinand Alexander Porsche (1935–2012)	Gerhard Anton Porsche (1938–2026)	Hans-Peter Porsche (b. 1940)	Wolfgang Heinz Porsche (b. 1943)

=== Piëch descendants of Louise Porsche ===
- Children of Ernst Piëch and his wife Elisabeth Nordhoff (1936–) daughter of Heinrich Nordhoff (1899–1968)
  - Charlotte Piëch-Wanivenhaus (1960–)
  - Florian Piëch (1962–)
  - Sebastian Piëch (1967–)
- Children of Louise Piëch and her husband Josef Ahorner:
  - Louise Dorothea Ahorner-Kiesling (1957–2022)
    - Andreas Johann Kiesling (1989–)
    - Hubertus Kiesling (1992–)
  - Josef Michael Ahorner (1960–)
    - Ferdinand Stefan Samuel Ahorner (1998–)
    - Nicola Louise Ahorner (2000–)
- Children of Ferdinand Piëch: with wife Corina von Planta (Arianne, Corina, Desiree, Ferdinand "Nando", and Jasmin), with Marlene Maurer (Hans, Valentin, and Anton), with Herma Hutter (Ferdinand and Caroline) and with wife Ursula Plasser (Markus, Florina Louise, and Gregor Anton)
  - Arianne Piëch (1959–)
  - Corina Piëch-Saxer (1960–)
    - Corina Lorena Saxer
    - Ladina Rebecca Saxer
  - Desiree Piëch (1962–)
  - Ferdinand "Nando" Piëch (1967–)
  - Jasmin Piëch-Lange (1969–)
    - Moritz Lange
  - Hans Piëch (1973–)
  - Valentin Piëch (1975–)
  - Anton Piëch (1978–)
  - Ferdinand Piëch (1979–)
  - Caroline Piëch-Büchele (1982–)
  - Markus Piëch (1985–)
  - Florina Louise Piëch-Pantic (1987–)
  - Gregor Anton Piëch (1994–)
- Children of Hans-Michel Piëch and his wife Veronika Piëch (Helene and Sophie):
  - Claudia Fox Piëch-Linton (1964–)
  - Melanie Piëch-Wenckheim (1967–)
  - Stefan Piëch (1970–)
  - Julia Piëch-Kuhn (1981–)
  - Helene Piëch (1993–)
  - Sophie Piëch (1994–)

=== Porsche descendants of Ferry Porsche ===
- Children of Ferdinand Alexander Porsche and his wife Brigitte Bube (1937–):
  - Ferdinand Oliver Porsche (1961–)
  - Kai Alexander Porsche (1964–)
  - Mark Philipp Porsche (1977–)
- Children of Gerhard Porsche and his wife Iris Porsche (Diana):
  - Geraldine Porsche (1980–)
  - Diana Porsche (1996–)
- Child of Hans-Peter Porsche and his wife Kuni Porsche:
  - Peter Daniell Porsche (1973–)
    - Ismene Porsche (1998–)
    - Orlando Porsche (2000–)
    - Tamino Porsche (2002–)
    - Aurelia Porsche (2004–)
- Children of Wolfgang Porsche: with Karin Handler (Christian and Stephanie), with wife Susanne Bresser (Ferdinand and Felix)
  - Christian Porsche (1974–)
  - Stephanie Porsche-Schroder (1978–)
  - Ferdinand Rudolf Porsche (1993–)
  - Felix Alexander Porsche (1996–)

== Shareholdings ==
- Porsche SE (subscribed capital: 50%/voting power: 100%)
  - Volkswagen Group (subscribed capital: 31.9%/voting power: 53.4%)
    - Porsche (subscribed capital: 75%/voting power: 75% – 1)
    - Porsche Holding
  - Porsche (subscribed capital: 12.5%/voting power: 25% + 1)
    - Porsche Design Group
- Piëch Automotive (co-owned by Toni Piëch)

== Gallery ==
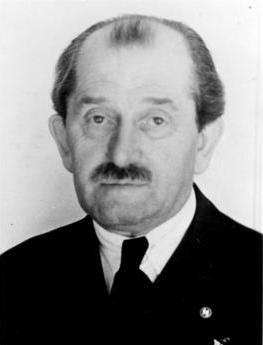
Ferdinand Porsche

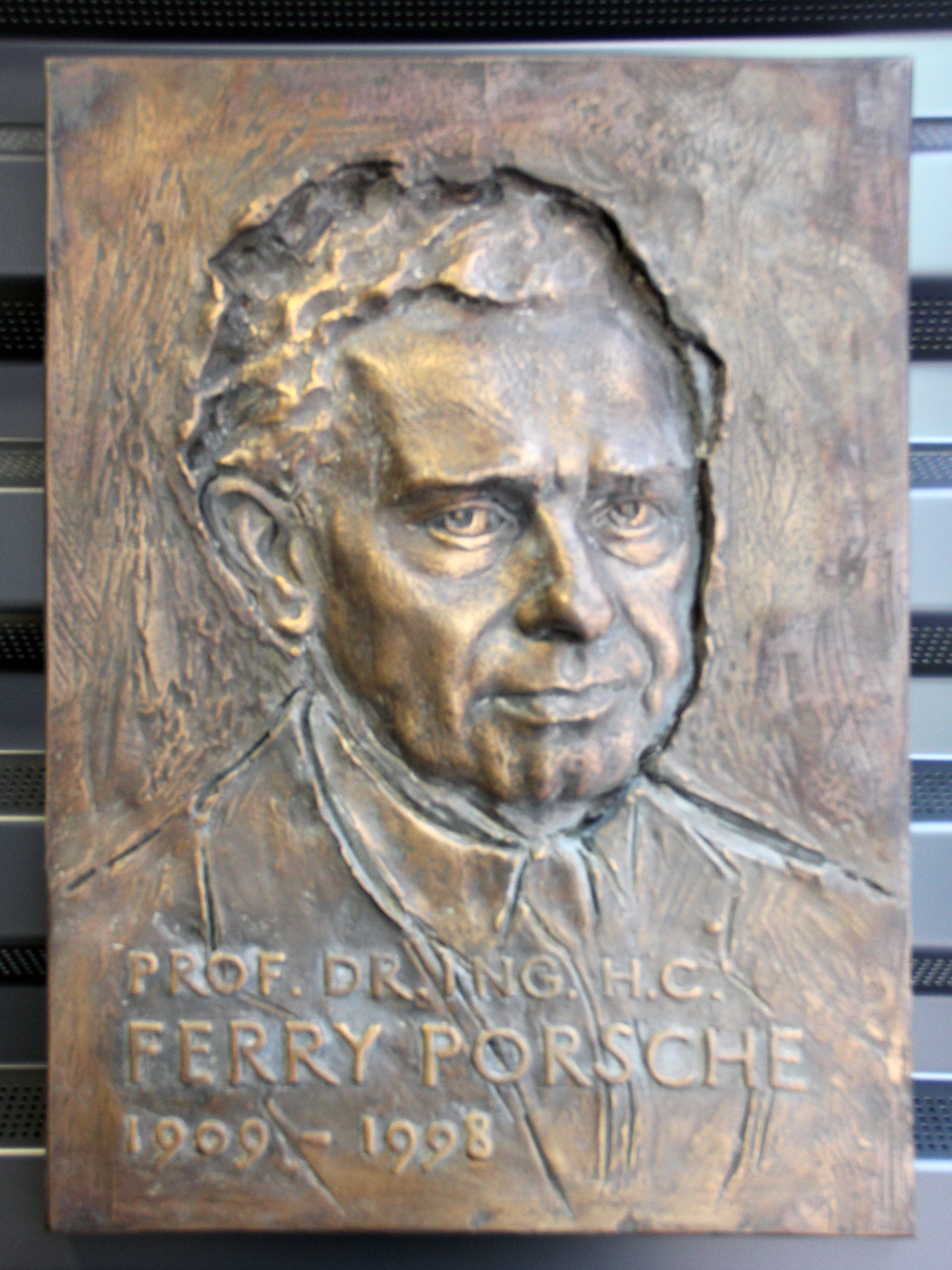
Ferry Porsche

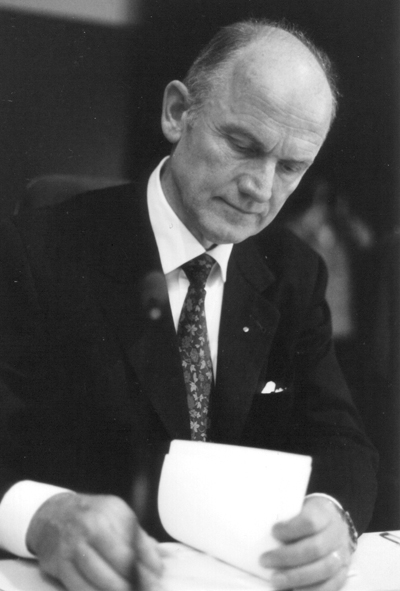
Ferdinand Piëch
