= Chroma Cnife =

American kitchen knife maker

Chroma

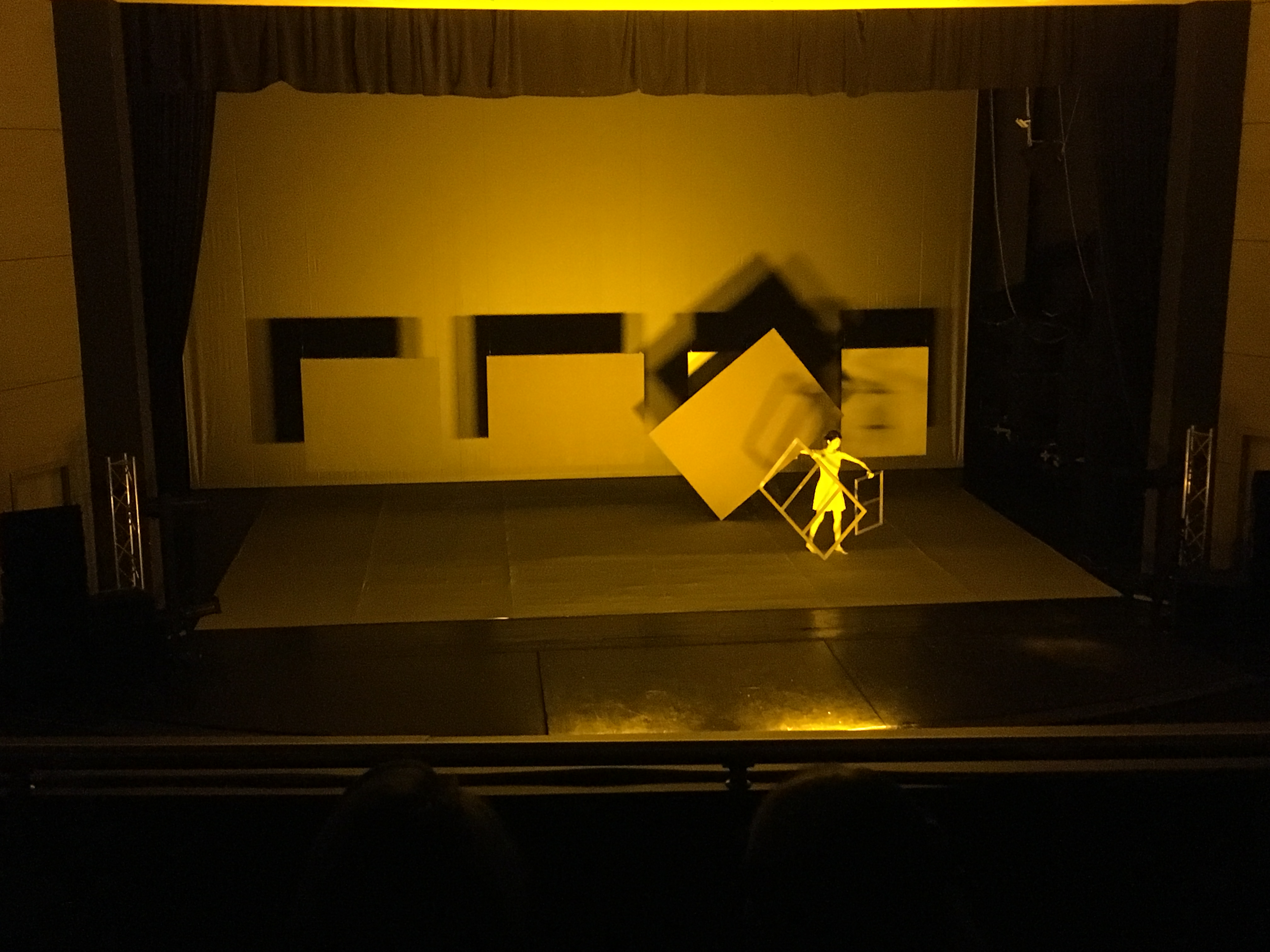
- Industry: Kitchenware
- Founded: 1989; 37 years ago
- Headquarters: Demorest, Georgia, US
- Area served: Worldwide
- Products: Kitchen knives, accessories, spice grinders
- Number of employees: 180
- Website: http://www.cnife.com/

Chroma Cutlery (also known as Chroma Cnife, and styled CHROMA) is a kitchen knife-maker based in Demorest, Georgia, US, founded in 1989. Chroma also produces spice grinders, knife sharpening stones, kitchen shears and other cooking accessories. The company also manufactures products for other brands.

== Overview ==
The company is owned by Garwick Industries Ltd.. Chroma's main market is Europe.

The Chroma knife range starts from US$20 for a quality Chinese made knife to US$25,000 for an original knife made by Japanese Master Okishiba Masakuni. In 2023 Garwick sold its HAIKU Ranges to HAIKU International, a French-based importer.

== Product line ==
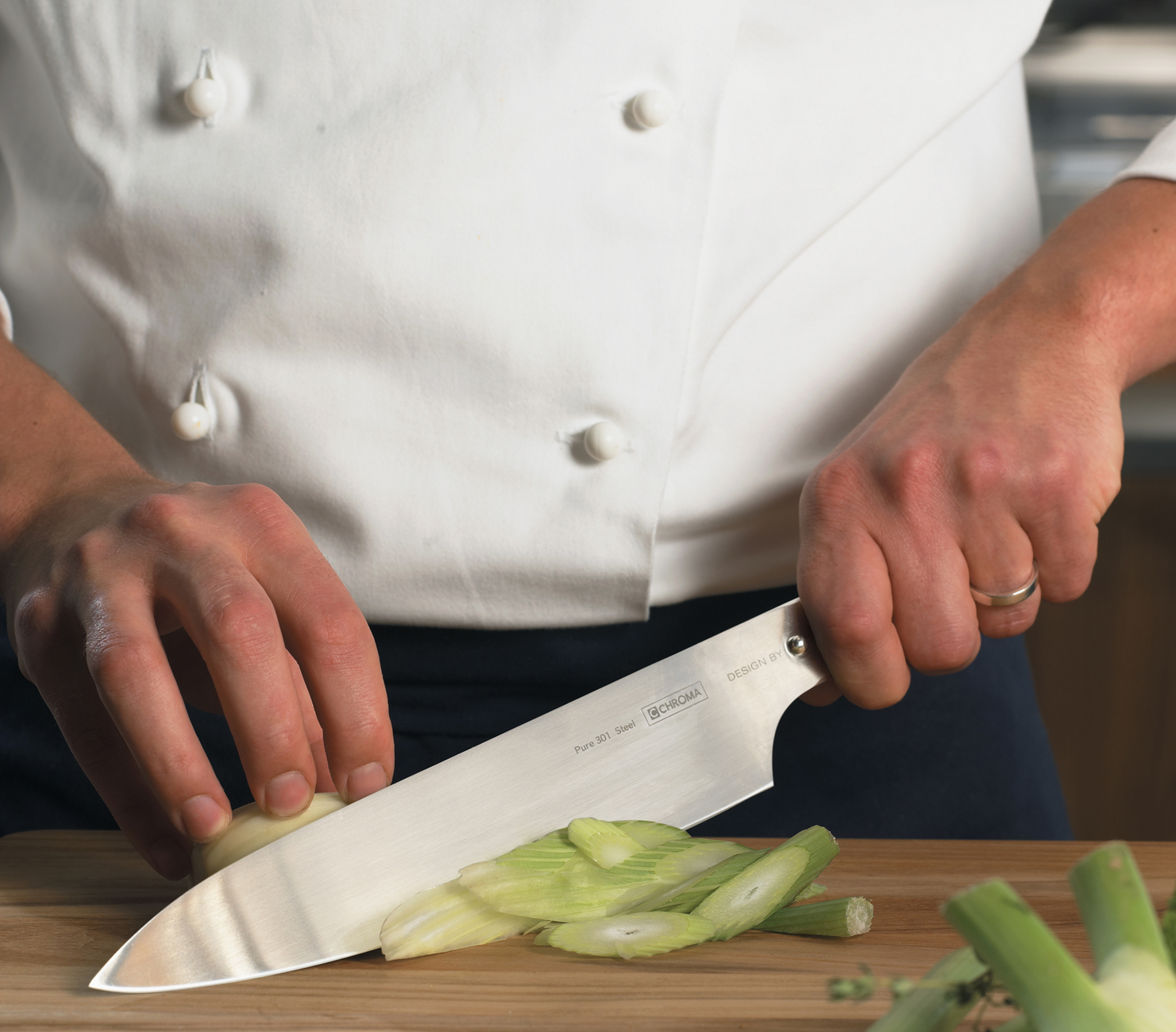
The Chroma Type 301

Chroma's main series include:

- Type 301 – a stainless steel knife range designed by German designer F. A. Porsche in cooperation with professional chefs
- Sharpening stones – whetstones for knives
- ProCuTe – a spice grinder with titanium cutting gear

== Professional users ==
Chroma knives target professional users. Some celebrity chefs like Bocuse d'or winners use Chroma knives. The knives are most popular in European countries, primarily Germany, France, Sweden and Belgium.

== Awards ==
- Focus Way of Life – International Design Award, Federal German State Baden-Württemberg, 2002 for Chroma type 301
- Formexpriset 2003 – Stockholmmässan Nordic Design Award, 2003 for Chroma type 301
- Adolf Loos Staatspreis Design 2003 – for Chroma type 301
- IF Design Award 2005 – for Chroma type 301
- Stiftung Warentest, Germany: Knife Test: Chroma Haiku 2nd Place
- Der Feinschmecker "Must have" – "Product of the month" of Germany's leading Gourmet magazine, May 2010 for Chroma ProCuTe Spice Grinder
- Best knife in test – for Chroma type 301 P-18 by "Test Fakta" – Nordic Test institute, Sweden – for best quality and performance
