= Porsha =

Porsha may refer to:

== Places ==
- Porsha Upazila, an upazila of Naogaon District in Rajshahi, Bangladesh

== People ==
- Porsha Ferguson (born 1989), American actress
- Porsha Lawrence Mavour, English actress who played Kelsey Hooper in The Sarah Jane Adventures
- Porsha Olayiwola (born 1988), American poet
- Porsha Phillips (born 1988), American professional women's basketball player
- Porsha Stubbs-Smith, Turks and Caicos Islander politician
- Porsha Williams (born 1981), American television personality, model, and actress

=== Fictional characters ===
- Porsha Taylor, character played by Ta'Rhonda Jones in the 2015 U.S. TV series, Empire
- Porsha Crystal, a character from the animated film Sing 2

== See also ==
- La'Porsha Renae (born 1993), American singer-songwriter
- Porsche (disambiguation)
