= Porsche Panamericana =

Concept car developed by Porsche

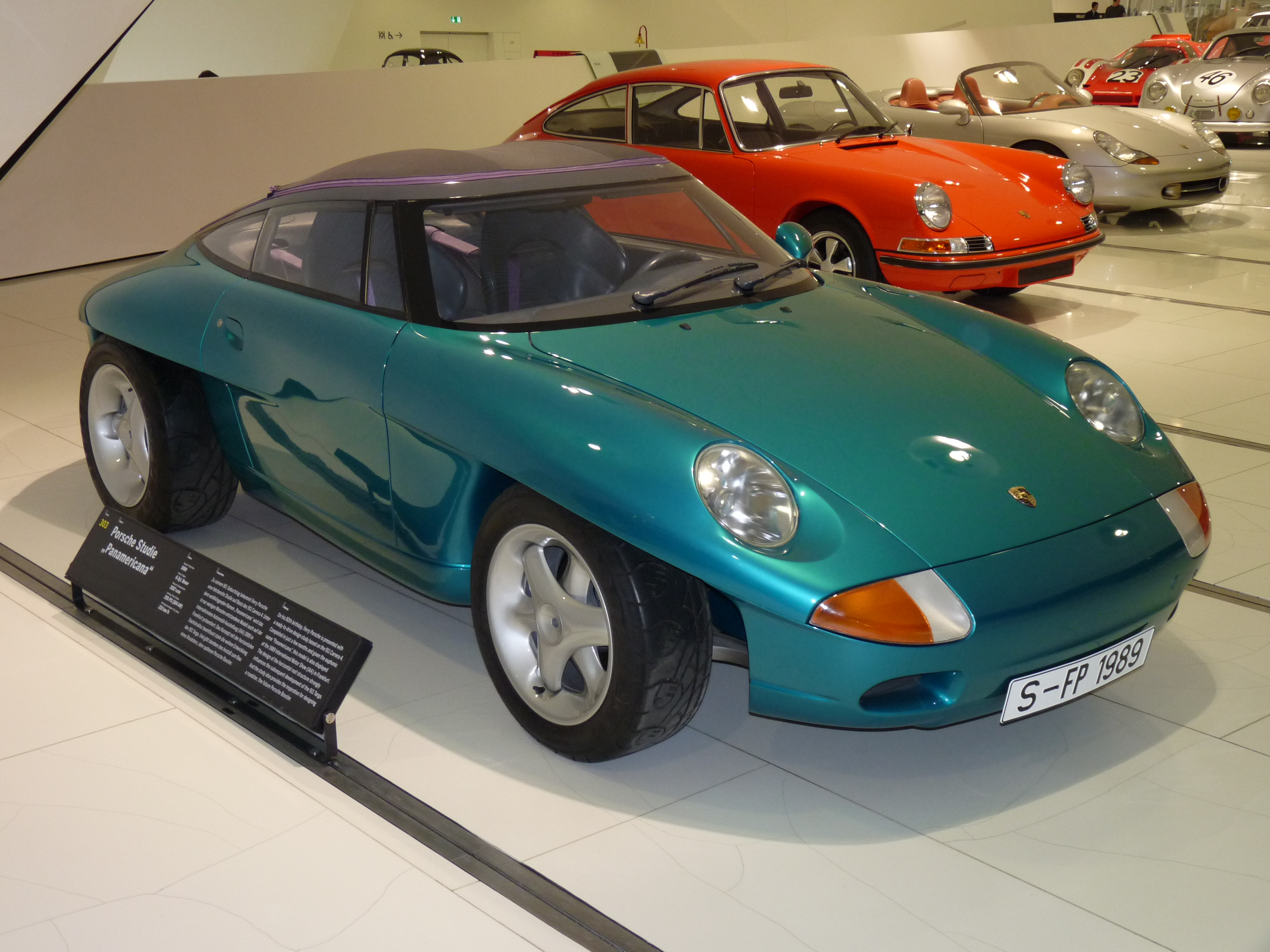
- Porsche Panamericana in the Porsche Museum, Stuttgart

Overview
- Type: Concept car
- Manufacturer: Porsche
- Production: 1989
- Designer: Harm Lagaay, Steve Murkett

Body and chassis
- Layout: Rear-engine, four-wheel-drive layout
- Related: Porsche 911 (964)

Powertrain
- Engine: 3.6 L flat-six
- Transmission: 5-speed manual

The Porsche Panamericana is a concept car produced by Porsche AG, designed by Dutchman Harm Lagaay along with Steve Murkett (designers) and Ulrich Bez (technical director) to preview design features of the forthcoming 993 generation 911. It was also built as a gift for Ferry Porsche for his 80th birthday. The name comes from the famous Carrera Panamericana race that was held in the 1950s.

The Porsche Panamericana was intended only as a concept car, and although Lagaay hoped that his creation would be manufactured at least in small series in 1992, the growing financial crisis at Porsche put an end to his wishes. The Panamericana did influence development of the 993 911 Targa and Boxster. The Panamericana was presented at the 1989 Frankfurt Motor Show, after a development period of six months.

Using the chassis of a 911 (964) Carrera 4 cabriolet, its bodywork was built with plastic and carbon fiber panels. The Panamericana's wheel covers, with enough room for various sizes of rims and tires, could accommodate off-road driving.

The three-part Speedline rims used on the concept were made exclusively for this Panamericana. The roof line was streamlined and sloped gently towards the rear engine deck and featured a removable waterproof fabric top that could be attached by a pink zipper. Various roof configurations were possible and the car was in fact a hybrid of a targa, convertible, coupe, and off-roader.

Viewed from the front it resembles the 996 and the Boxster. In spite of its un-streamlined wheels, its aerodynamic drag coefficient was only 0.30.

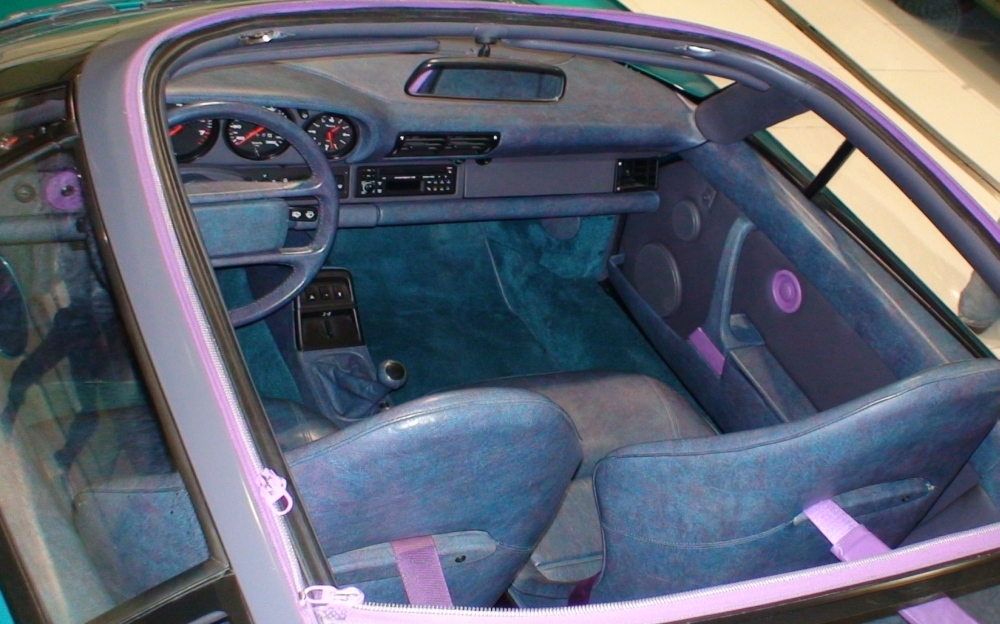
Panamericana interior with top off

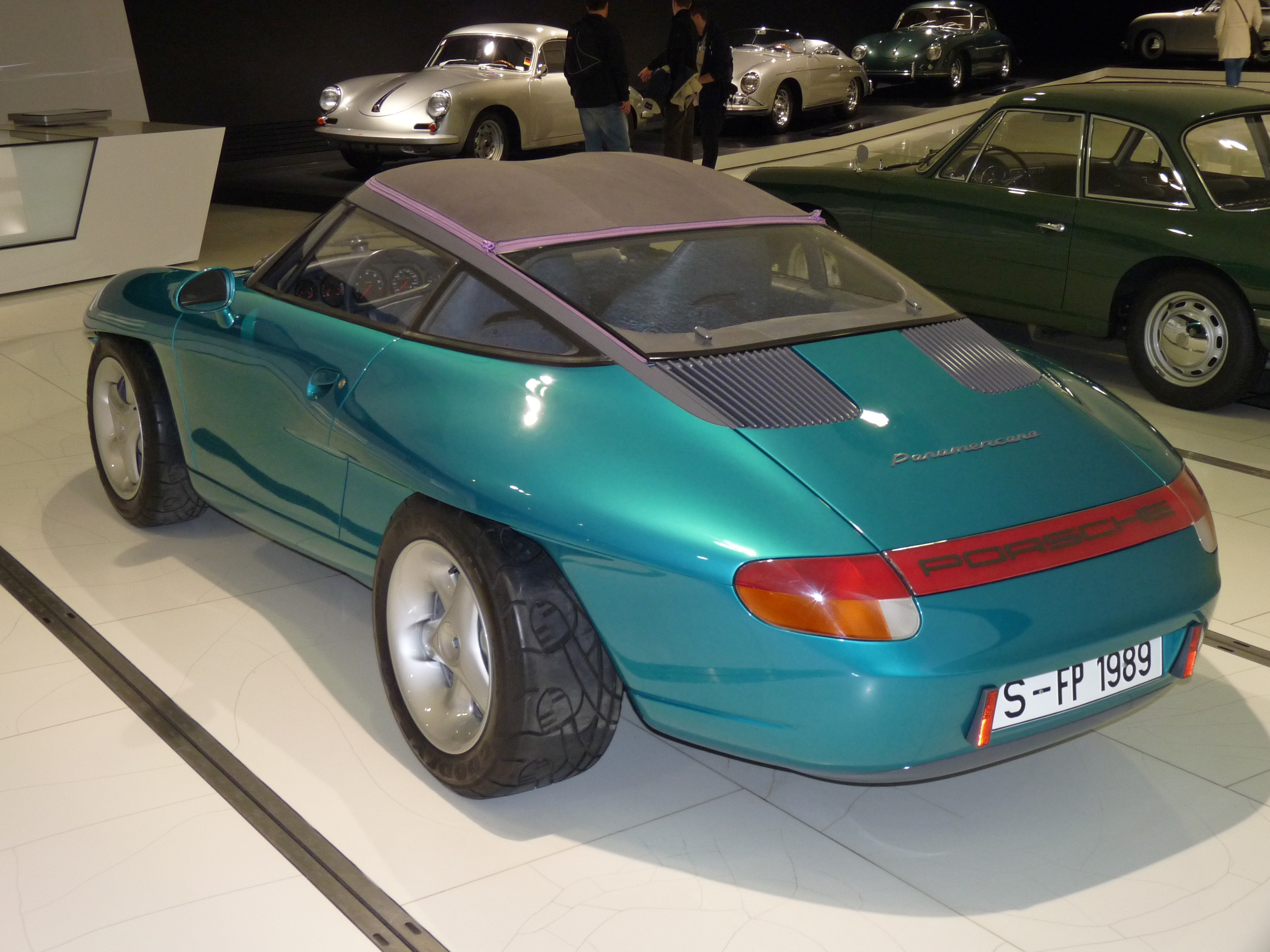
Panamericana rear end
