= Piëch Automotive =

Swiss car manufacturer

Piëch Automotive AG
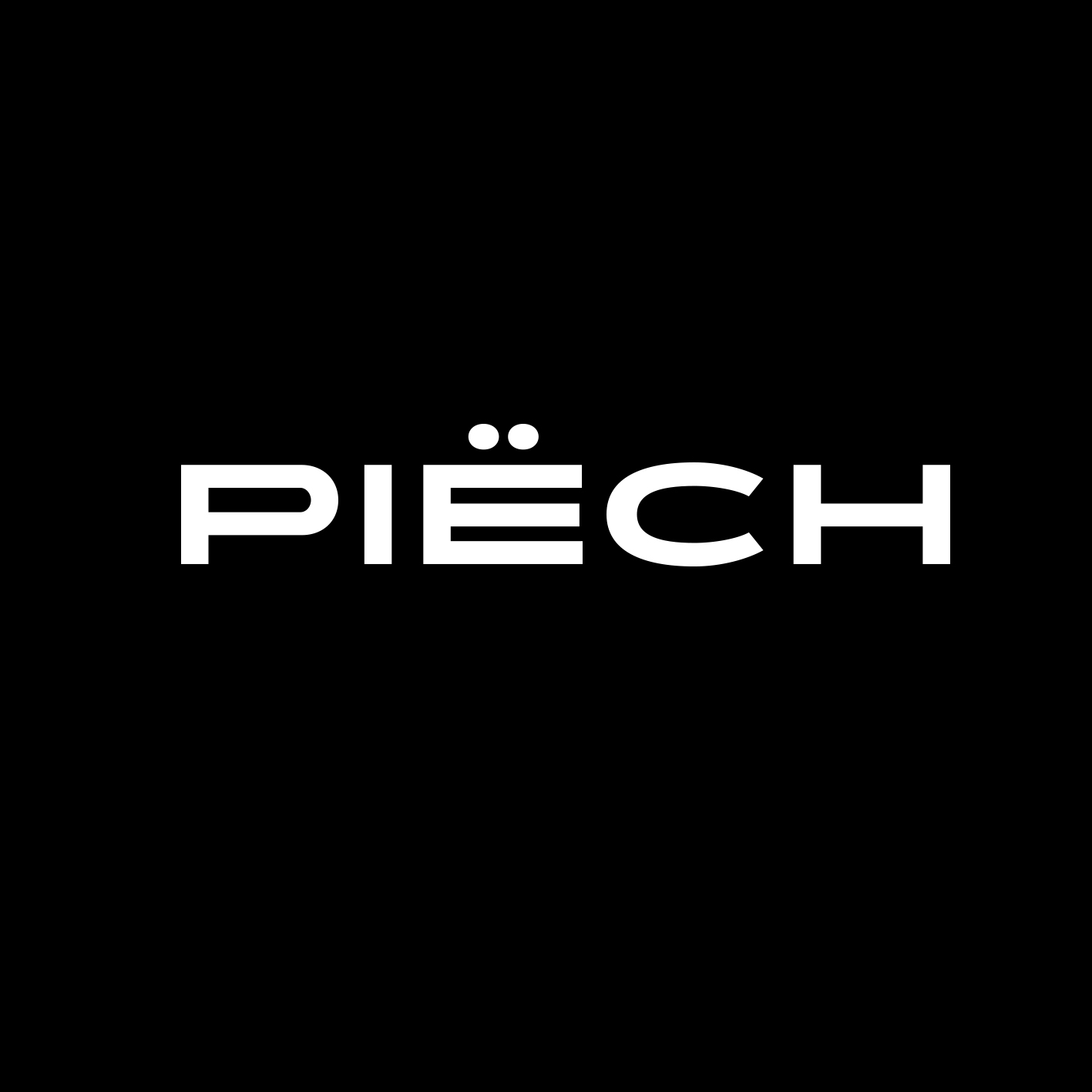
- Type: public limited company
- Industry: Automotive
- Founded: 2017
- Founders: Rea Stark Rajcic; Anton Piech
- Headquarters: Zug, Switzerland
- Key people: Anton Piech (Chairman); Tobias Moers (Co-CEO); Klaus Schmidt (CTO); Dr. Timo Kauer (CFO); Rea Stark Rajcic; (CDO)
- Products: Electric vehicles
- Parent: Piëch Holding AG
- Website: piech.com

Piëch Automotive is an electric car manufacturer based in Zug, Switzerland, founded in August 2017 by Anton "Toni" Piëch and Rea Stark Rajcic.

== History ==
Anton Piëch, son of former Volkswagen Group CEO Ferdinand Piëch, and great-grandson of Ferdinand Porsche, founded Piëch Automotive in 2017 with industrial designer Rea Stark Rajcic.

Piëch Automotive presented their first model, the GT Mark Zero (or Mk0), at the 2019 Geneva International Motor Show.

The particularity of Piëch Automotive's engineering is its modular concept, which makes it possible to keep software and hardware components up to date, in order to keep up with developments and technical progress, so the powertrain is interchangeable, while maintaining the structure and bodywork of the vehicle. The entire vehicle concept is designed and engineered for lean manufacturing with external partners without vertically integrating any production in the company.

== Mark Zero concept ==
Piëch Mark Zero GT
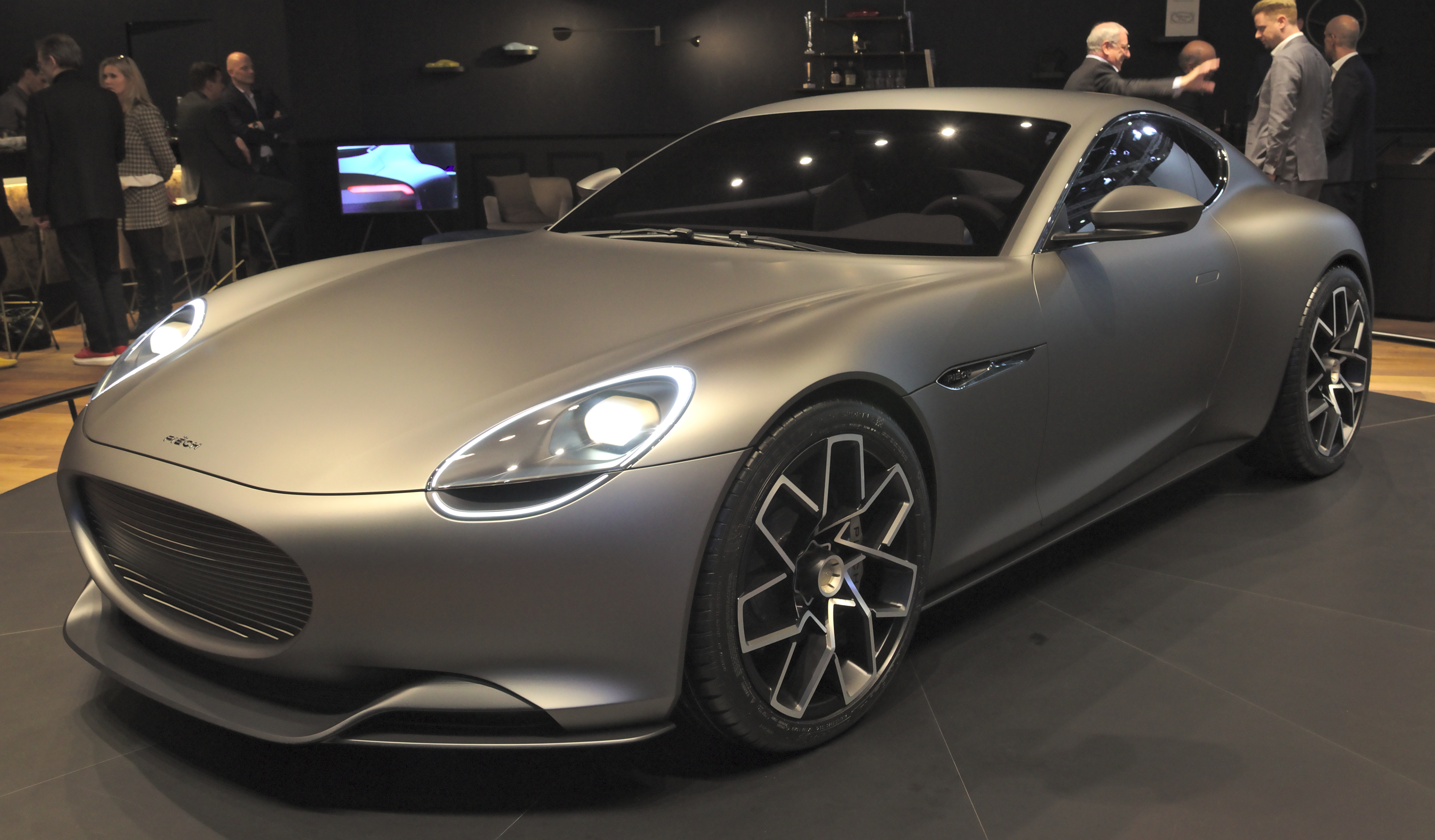

Overview
- Manufacturer: Piech Automotive
- Also called: Mark Zero, or Mk0
- Production: 2019 (Mark Zero) 2028 (GT)
- Model years: 2028

Body and chassis
- Class: Concept Car

Powertrain
- Electric motor: Front: 150 kW; Rear: 2x150 kW
- Range: 500 km

Dimensions
- Length: 4,430.0 mm (174.41 in)
- Width: 1,990.1 mm (78.35 in)
- Height: 1,249.9 mm (49.21 in)
- Kerb weight: 1,800–1,800 kg (3,968.32–3,968.32 lb)

The Piëch Mark Zero GT, whose first sketches date back to 2017, was presented as a concept car at the Geneva Motor Show in March 2019.

=== Specifications ===
The car is a two-seater sports coupé. The first models were planned to be delivered in 2022, equipped with electric motors and a battery positioned on the central tunnel as far as the rear axle, for a weight of 1,800 kg. The Mark Zero will be able to accommodate thermal, hybrid or fuel cell powertrains thanks to its modular platform, which was planned to be used for an SUV and a "Piëch sedan" in a second phase.

=== Powertrain ===
The Mark Zero is equipped with three electric motors, a 150 kW asynchronous electric motor mounted on the front axle and two independent synchronous electric motors mounted on the rear axle of 150 kW each, providing a total power of 600 hp.

Piëch claims its innovative battery is 80% rechargeable in 4 min 40 s on a 380 kW fast terminal that has not yet been deployed in 2019, for a range of 500 km.

=== Reception ===
The design of the new car concept was mainly evaluated positively. Klaus Schmidt for example, former sportscar developer of the BMW M GmbH, describes the design as unique.

=== Production ===
In September 2021, the company began testing the Piëch GT4, with the car expected to go into production mid-2024. The production version was expected to do 0 to 60 mph in under three seconds, and 0 to 124 mph in less than nine seconds. Piëch says it is working with Chinese company TGOOD on a proprietary charger that can refill 80% of the battery in five minutes In June 2024, the model was updated with a new look, with production supposed to start for 2028.
