= Wolfgang Porsche =

German-Austrian manager (born 1943)

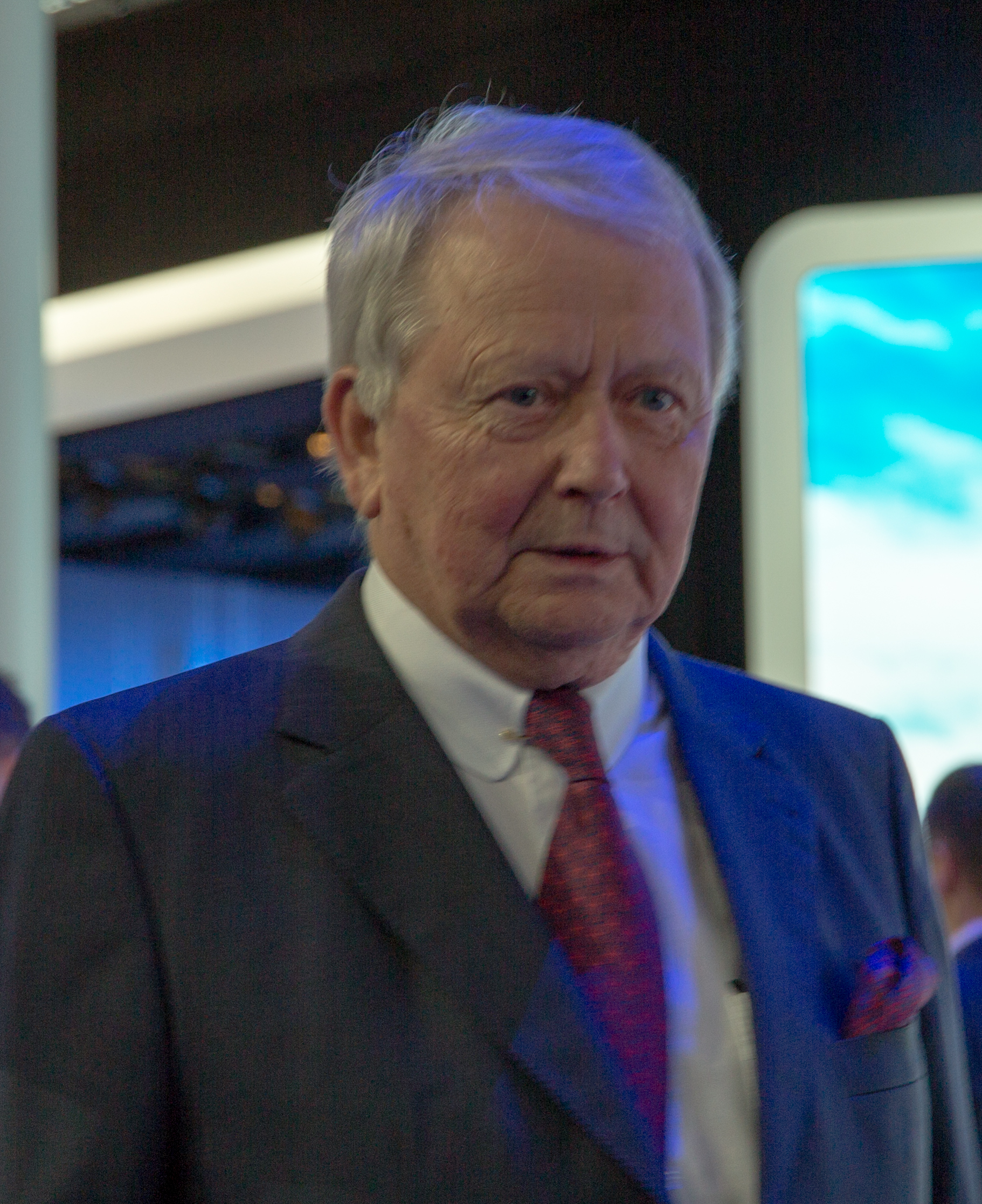
- Porsche in 2017
- Born: Wolfgang Heinz Porsche; 10 May 1943 (age 83); Stuttgart, Germany
- Citizenship: German, Austrian
- Occupation: Porsche executive
- Spouses: Susanne Bresser (m. 1988; div. 2008); Claudia Hubner (m. 2019; sep. 2023); Gabriele Homey (m. 2025)
- Children: 4
- Parents: Ferdinand Anton Ernst Porsche (father); Dorothea Reitz (mother)
- Relatives: Ferdinand Porsche (grandfather); Ferdinand Alexander Porsche (brother); Ferdinand Piëch (cousin)

Wolfgang Heinz Porsche (born 10 May 1943) is a German-Austrian manager and a member of the Porsche family. He is a shareholder and chairman of the Supervisory Board of Porsche Automobil Holding SE as well as of Porsche AG. He is the youngest son of Ferdinand (Ferry) Porsche and Dorothea Reitz. His oldest brother is Ferdinand (Butzi) Porsche, designer of the Porsche 911.

== Early life ==
After schooling, Porsche trained as a metalworker, and eventually obtained a degree in Business Administration from the Vienna University of Economics and Business. After qualifying, Porsche established his own business, importing Yamaha motorbikes to Austria. In 1976, Porsche joined Daimler-Benz. Two years later, he was appointed to the Supervisory Board of Porsche AG.

== Administrative and supervisory positions ==
In 2007, Porsche became Chairman of both Porsche AG and Porsche Automobil Holding SE. In 2008, Porsche also joined the Supervisory Board of Volkswagen AG. Porsche is a member of board of directors of Porsche Automobil Holding, along with Josef Michael Ahorner, Stefan Piëch, Peter Daniell Porsche, Hans Michel Piech, Ferdinand Oliver Porsche and Hans-Peter Porsche. Porsche also sits on the supervisory board of separately listed Volkswagen AG.
