= Ferdinand Alexander Porsche =

German-Austrian industrial designer (1935–2012)

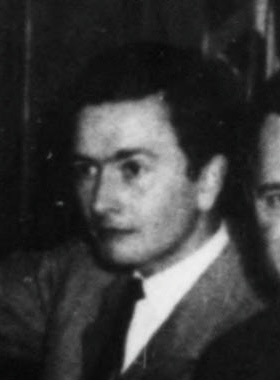
- Porsche in 1958
- Born: 11 December 1935; Stuttgart, Germany
- Died: 5 April 2012 (aged 76); Salzburg, Austria
- Citizenship: Germany; Austria
- Occupations: Porsche designer, Porsche Design founder and executive
- Notable work: Porsche 904; Porsche Typ 754 T7; Porsche 911
- Spouse: Brigitte Bube
- Children: 3
- Parents: Ferry Porsche (father); Dorothea Reitz (mother)
- Relatives: Ferdinand Porsche (grandfather); Wolfgang Porsche (brother); Ferdinand Piëch (cousin)
- Family: Porsche

Ferdinand Alexander Porsche (11 December 1935 – 5 April 2012), also known by the nickname "Butzi", was a German-Austrian designer whose best known product was the first Porsche 911. He was the son of Ferry Porsche, and the grandson of Ferdinand Porsche.

While his grandfather and father were both engineers, he was more involved in working out the appearance of a product. He never thought of himself as an artist or designer, but more as a technically talented craftsman in shaping.

== Education ==
After attending the Waldorf School in Stuttgart he began studying industrial design at the Ulm School of Design. After a year he was dismissed by the examination board, because his talent was doubted. In 1957 he started practical training at the body design department of the family-owned sports car company under design director Erwin Komenda.

== Porsche 911 ==
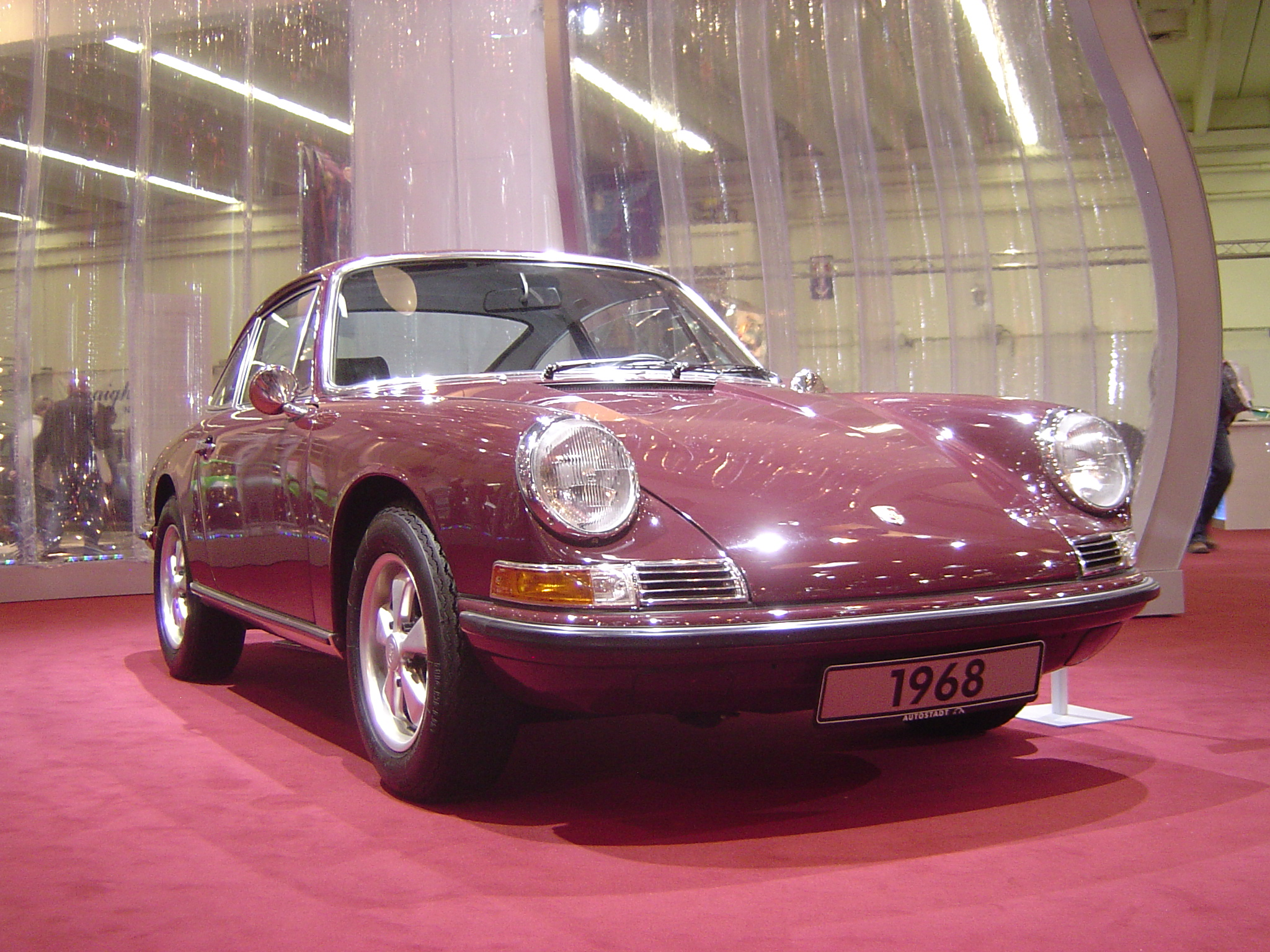
1968 Porsche 911

When it came to the designworks of the coachwork for the company's most successful car so far, the Porsche 911, Ferdinand Alexander was heavily involved, as it was family tradition that every generation of the Porsche family took part in the genesis of a new car generation. Ferry Porsche wished the successor of his 356 should provide more space and comfort in the cabin, though he was also cited as saying, "Comfort is not what makes driving fun, it is more on the opposite." The trunk, especially, should have provided more space. Ferdinand Alexander's first drafts were well accepted, but Komenda made unapproved changes over the objections of Ferdinand and Ferry. Ferry set the main attributes concerning wheelbase, power figures and suspension and after Komenda still did not cooperate, he took F.A.'s drawings to the coachwork manufacturer Reutter across the street. They gave the actual shape to the 901 as it was presented at the 1963 Frankfurt Motor Show. The original project code 901 was changed to 911 after legal objection by Peugeot which held trademark protection on three-number-combinations with "0" in the middle. Production began in 1964.

== Porsche 904 ==
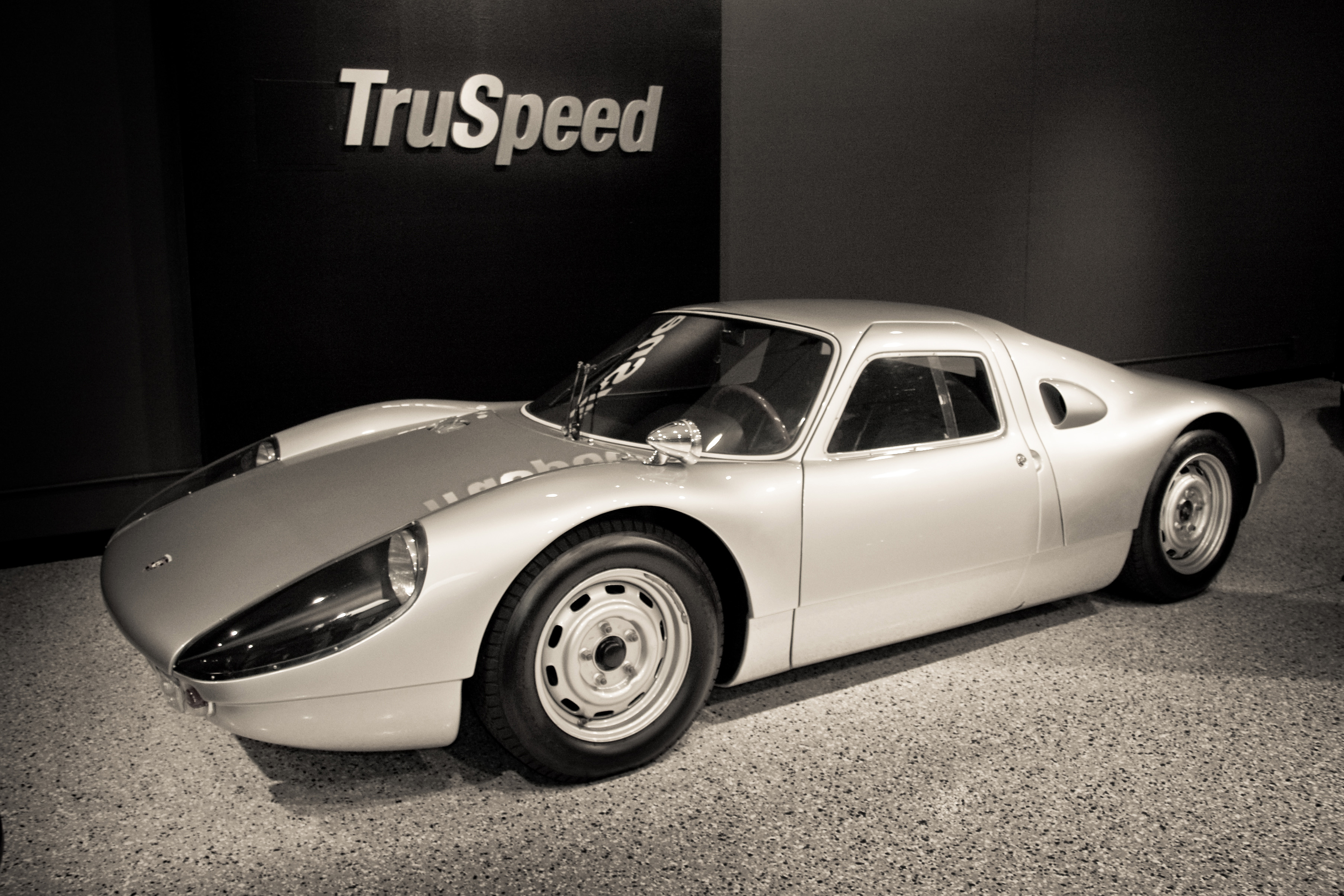
Porsche 904

Ferdinand Alexander also shaped another important car, the Porsche 904. He stated that the 904 was his favorite work for Porsche. Its body shell was made of Fiberglass-reinforced resin at the aircraft company Heinkel. The car was to be approved by racing homologation officers until a set date in order to attend the same year's racing season. Thus, the development team was under extreme time pressure. F.A. liked the design of the 904 best, as there was no time for anyone to demand or initiate changes, so it is his most original draft.

== Porsche Design Group ==
After the family decided to change the company's legal form and to keep the family out of its management, Ferdinand Alexander founded his own industrial design company, Porsche Design, in Stuttgart, which was later moved to Zell am See, Austria, where the Porsche family owns an estate called Schüttgut. The first product Porsche Design created was a chronograph wristwatch made by Swiss watchmaker company Orfina. Its design started while F.A. was still working at the Porsche Style bureau. It was launched in 1973 and was different from other chronograph wristwatches, as its case and bracelet were made out of matte black chromed steel. It was intended as accessory for Porsche drivers and sold by the Porsche dealers. It operated the then-new Valjoux 7750 movement, which is today still the most widespread mechanical movement for chronograph wristwatches. As many customers would have liked a normally-coloured watch, a version with bead-blasted stainless steel was issued. Later the movement was changed to the Lemania 5100, which was a simple and rugged movement mainly used for military watches. The Porsche Design Chrono I was made in different versions — color of case and straps, print on dial — for several country's air forces, as well as the NATO alliance.

In 1978 F.A. teamed up with Swiss watchmaker International Watch Company (IWC) to develop a wristwatch combining a non-magnetic automatic movement and a compass, the so-called Kompassuhr. The movement was housed in a hinge-attached upper case that could be flapped to give sight on the compass in the lower part of the case. Its cases and bracelet was made out of PVD coated aluminum (matte black or matte olive). Later versions had the cases and bracelet made out of titanium. IWC pioneered use of titanium in watch cases/bracelets together with F.A. in the development of the Titan Chronograph launched in 1980. The Titan Chronograph was the first watch to use titanium in wristwatches. IWC had to develop work processes paying attention to titanium's specific properties. The unique design aspect of the Titan Chronograph were the pushers to operate the stopwatch functions being integrated in the case's contour.

F.A.'s appeal to using unusual materials showed in the very rare Chrono II made by IWC. Its case was made of bead-blasted aluminum with bracelet made out of fibre-reinforced resin. This watch also employed integrated pushers.

Watches are still a main business of Porsche Design. In 1996 the Swiss watchmaker Eterna, which invented the ball bearing for the winding rotor used in automatic movements, was bought by F.A. holding company.

The Porsche Design product suffering most often from plagiarism is probably the sunglasses with drop-shaped lenses, which was issued during the 1980s in a lot of unusual color combinations, e.g., purple lenses with golden or white frame. F.A. designed many more spectacles. Most often, they had some unique attributes — e.g., a saddle-shaped cushion adapting to the nose shape automatically and opening symmetrically through an internal cam mechanism. The drop-shaped spectacle had a quick release mechanism to provide quick lens changes. One pair even had magnetically held lenses; another one got its shape from the intended production method: Its shape was accommodated to a sand casting process of titanium. The production issue was actually not made of titanium, but the shape remained.

Transportation design remained an issue on F.A. Porsche. He made several studies for metropolitan trains, a motorcycle, several bicycles and a slightly dolphin-shaped racing boat called Kineo.

As the company grew the product categories diversified. There are three possibilities how designs made by Porsche Design can appear — Porsche Design brand products made exclusively for Porsche Design; products bearing the manufacturer's name and the writing "Design by F.A. Porsche"; and products with no hint of Porsche Design at all. Porsche Design came up with several bathroom designs, a washing machine, furniture, knives, television receivers, desk lamps (one with three telescoping radio antennas attaching the light bulb holder to the base and one employing design aspects of a guillotine in its pull-out mechanism), tobacco pipes with air-cooled-engine-inspired cooling fins, pens made out of wire-cloth used in oil hoses for racing engines, computer monitors, computer external hard drives, coffee makers, and even a grand piano for an Austrian manufacturer Bösendorfer. The Design by F.A. Porsche mark is used no more, with the exception of the professional kitchen knives of Chroma Cnife.

The formerly completely private owned Porsche Design company belongs in the meantime to a cooperation company between F.A. Porsche and the Dr.-Ing. hc F. Porsche AG, of which F.A. held roughly 13%. F.A. Porsche retired in 2005 on health grounds. He was given the title Honorary Chairman of the Supervisory Board, a title that was originally invented for his father when he retired. He died in Salzburg, Austria on 5 April 2012, aged 76.
