= Ferdinand Piëch =

Austrian industrialist and head of Volkswagen (1937–2019)

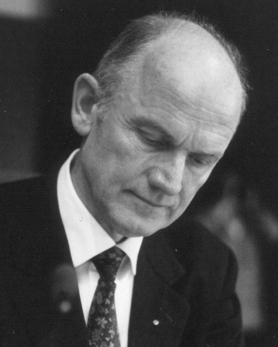
- Born: Ferdinand Karl Piëch; 17 April 1937; Vienna, Austria
- Died: 25 August 2019 (aged 82); Rosenheim, Germany
- Occupations: Automobile engineer, business executive
- Known for: Chairman of Volkswagen Group until 25 April 2015
- Spouses: Corina von Planta (before 1984) Ursula Plasser (m. 1984)
- Children: 13
- Parents: Anton Piëch (father); Louise Porsche (mother)
- Relatives: Ferdinand Porsche (grandfather); Ferry Porsche (uncle); Ferdinand Alexander Porsche (cousin); Wolfgang Porsche (cousin)

Ferdinand Karl Piëch (German pronunciation: [ˈfɛʁdinant ˈpiːɛç]; 17 April 1937 – 25 August 2019) was an Austrian business magnate, engineer, and executive who held the positions of chairman of the executive board (Vorstandsvorsitzender) of the Volkswagen Group from 1993 to 2002, and chairman of the supervisory board (Aufsichtsratsvorsitzender) from 2002 to 2015.

As a grandson of Ferdinand Porsche, Piëch began his career at Porsche before moving to Audi, where he was instrumental in transforming the brand into a formidable competitor to Mercedes-Benz and BMW, thanks to groundbreaking models like the Audi Quattro and the Audi 100. Trained as an engineer, Piëch had a profound impact on the design and engineering of several iconic vehicles, including the Porsche 911, Porsche 917, Audi Quattro, and most notably the Bugatti Veyron, which, as of 2012, held the title of the fastest, most powerful, and most expensive road-legal car ever produced. Due to his significant contributions to the automotive industry, Piëch was named "Car Executive of the Century" in 1999 and was inducted into the Automotive Hall of Fame in 2014.

== Biography ==
Piëch was born in Vienna, Austria and was the third child of Viennese lawyer Anton Piëch and his wife Louise, who was the daughter of Ferdinand Porsche. His older brother Ernst Piëch (born 1929) is the son-in-law of Heinrich Nordhoff, the first CEO of Volkswagen. His sister Louise Piëch-Ahorner (1932–2006) worked in management at the Austrian general importer of VW/Porsche in Salzburg. His younger brother Hans-Michel Piëch (born 1942) is a lawyer in Vienna.

From 1952 to 1958, Ferdinand Piëch attended the Swiss boarding school Lyceum Alpinum Zuoz in the Engadine. He graduated in 1962 from ETH Zurich in Switzerland with a degree in mechanical engineering, having written a master's thesis on the development of a Formula One (F1) engine.

He began his career at Porsche in 1963 under his uncle Ferry Porsche. He headed the development department from 1965 and became the technical director in 1971. During this time, he led the development of the Volkswagen EA 266, which was the planned successor to the Volkswagen Beetle. Although the project was completed in 1971, high development costs and profitability concerns meant the vehicle never left the prototype stage, with all 48 prototypes destroyed soon after.

Piëch was involved in the development of the Porsche 906 and subsequent models, including the successful Porsche 917. Piëch departed from the company in 1972. He subsequently founded his own engineering firm in Stuttgart and assisted in developing the Mercedes-Benz OM617 engine.

In August 1972, he joined Audi in Ingolstadt, serving as head of the special projects department. By 1975, he had become manager of technological engineering, became deputy chairman of the board in 1983 and in 1988 became chairman of the board of management. Piëch was responsible for the design concepts behind many Audi models from the 1970s and 1980s, including the Audi 80, the Audi 100, the Audi V8 and launched the world's first petrol five-cylinder engine in the 1977 Audi 100 5E. He initiated the development of a car for the World Rally Championship, which led to the creation of the Audi Quattro with its four-wheel drive system. The TDI diesel engine was also developed under Piëch's leadership.

== Time at Volkswagen ==
=== In management ===
In 1993, Piëch moved to the parent company of Volkswagen AG, becoming the Chairman of the Board of Management, succeeding Carl Hahn. Volkswagen was on the brink of bankruptcy at that time, but Piëch played a central role in orchestrating a dramatic turnaround. He addressed three main areas: First, production and procurement were to be optimized. Second, no more compromises were to be made regarding quality, and third, he expanded the VW Group's product range into additional areas such as the premium segment and the truck business. Piëch was Chairman of the Board of Management of Volkswagen until 2002, and subsequently Chairman of the Supervisory Board until April 2015. In 2000, Piëch was appointed chairman of Scania AB.

Under Piëch's leadership, Volkswagen consolidated an array of mid-sized and premium vehicle brands such as Volkswagen, Audi, Bentley, Bugatti, Ducati, Lamborghini, Porsche, Škoda, SEAT, Scania, and MAN under the VW Group umbrella and arranged them into a hierarchical structure akin to that used by Alfred Sloan at General Motors. According to Piëch, this strategy aimed to enhance these brands' status and reputation by taking full advantage of Volkswagen's engineering, design expertise, and commitment to quality.

=== Production optimization, procurement ===
In 1993, Piëch brought José Ignacio López and seven of his employees from General Motors to head the newly created board division for production optimization and procurement. López's negotiating tactics with suppliers, combined with the 28-hour workweek introduced by human resources director Peter Hartz, resulted in significantly reduced production costs at Volkswagen. Through extensive restructuring and rationalization measures to reduce costs, Piëch succeeded in bringing the Volkswagen Group back into profitability in the first few years.

=== North America ===
Volkswagen's market share deteriorated in the late 1970s and throughout the 1980s due to intense competition from Japanese automakers, poor quality control and the negative response to the "Americanized" Volkswagen Rabbit produced by the Westmoreland assembly plant. The good reputation built up by the Beetle was quickly squandered, the multi-year lead over Japanese competitors was lost and after Volkswagen closed the Westmoreland factory, they contemplated leaving the North American market in the early 1990s.

Audi sales were also affected due to reports that the Audi 100 (sold as the 5000 in North America) was prone to unintended acceleration events, which led to hundreds of accidents and several deaths. A weak US Dollar also raised the prices of German cars.

Piëch's decision to manufacture the Volkswagen New Beetle and the introduction of the vastly improved Golf Mk4, Jetta Mk4 and Passat B5 models revitalized Volkswagen's presence in the American market after years of stagnation and successfully repositioned the division as a premium rival to mainstream Japanese and American competitors.

During Piëch's tenure as chairman, Volkswagen sales in the United States rose from less than 50,000 cars in 1993 to 355,648 cars in 2001. Audi also experienced significant sales growth after introducing the A4, the redesigned A6 and the TT. Audi sold 85,726 cars in the United States in 2002, compared to just 12,117 cars in 1991.

=== Quality ===
After taking office in 1993, Piëch made very few compromises regarding quality and was very interested in understanding the causes of manufacturing problems and eliminating them. For example, the B-pillar of the Golf Mk4 was reinforced and partially hand-manufactured to ensure it performed no worse than the Mercedes-Benz A-Class in side-impact tests. Because of his meticulous attention to detail regarding small gaps, which are only possible with high body rigidity and therefore represent a quality feature, he was nicknamed "Gap Ferdl."

In 2014, fellow automotive executive Bob Lutz recounted a conversation he had with Piëch at the Frankfurt Auto Show in the early 1990s, in which he remarked how he was impressed with the fit and finish and tight body tolerances on Volkswagen's new models. Piëch told Lutz that he achieved this by assembling Volkswagen's top body engineers in his office and telling them they would all be fired if all of Volkswagen's vehicles didn't have body tolerances of 3 millimeters within six weeks.

=== Additional business areas ===
During his tenure, Piëch made significant moves into acquiring high-end marques, securing Lamborghini for Audi and establishing Bugatti Automobiles SAS. His acquisition of Rolls-Royce and Bentley proved more contentious. While Volkswagen successfully obtained the Crewe factory, car designs, nameplates and trademarks such as the Spirit of Ecstasy and the Rolls-Royce grille shape, it was denied the use of the Rolls-Royce name and emblem, which BMW had licensed from Rolls-Royce Holdings.

After negotiations, VW sold the Spirit of Ecstasy and the Rolls-Royce grille trademarks to BMW, allowing BMW to launch Rolls-Royce Motor Cars. Although Piëch later claimed that his primary interest was in Bentley, as it sold better than Rolls-Royce by a ratio of two to one, many saw the loss of the Rolls-Royce brand as a significant failure.

In the commercial vehicle sector, Scania and MAN were acquired, as was the Italdesign Giugiaro design studio. Volkswagen acquired motorcycle manufacturer Ducati in 2012, marking Volkswagen's entry into the motorcycle market.

Piëch was also the driving force behind the Volkswagen Phaeton luxury saloon, which was designed to compete with other high-end luxury cars. The Phaeton was a commercial failure, particularly in North America where only 3,500 cars were sold from 2004 until it was discontinued in 2006.

=== Farewell to VW ===
On 10 April 2015, he publicly stated that he was distancing himself from Martin Winterkorn, the CEO of Volkswagen AG and Porsche Automobil Holding SE. On 25 April 2015, Piëch resigned from all mandates within the Volkswagen Group with immediate effect because the Supervisory Board of Volkswagen AG no longer saw the mutual trust necessary for successful cooperation.

== Criticism ==
=== Problems within the VW Group ===
The Volkswagen Phaeton and the Bugatti Veyron, although they were successful at proving Volkswagen's technical capabilities, were developed at enormous expense and were consistent loss-leaders; Volkswagen lost an estimated $6 million on each Veyron that was sold and they also lost an estimated $40,000 on each Phaeton that was sold.

=== Personnel policy ===
As CEO of Volkswagen AG, he was partly responsible for the dismissal of numerous senior management employees and a large number of board members, both at Volkswagen and especially at Audi. Examples:

- Audi boss Franz-Josef Kortüm, who was dismissed after only 13 months in 1993 because Piëch was not satisfied with the sales figures.
- His successor, Herbert Demel, also had to vacate the position soon after repeated clashes with Piëch.
- Demel's successor, Franz-Josef Paefgen. Piëch dismissed him in 2001; previously, he had accused him of stagnation at Audi.

The discussion surrounding the future of VW CEO Bernd Pischetsrieder in early 2006, who had once been groomed by Piëch as his successor, was also triggered by a statement from Piëch. In February 2006, Piëch publicly questioned the support for Pischetsrieder from the employee representatives on VW's supervisory board. Nevertheless, Pischetsrieder's contract was extended in May 2006. However, this did not prevent the supervisory board from removing Pischetsrieder from his position on the board effective 31 December 2006.

=== VW emissions scandal ===
Piëch's role in the Volkswagen emissions scandal remains unclear, especially when he first learned of the allegations. Piëch claimed that he had informed members of the supervisory board, such as the Minister-President of Lower Saxony Stephan Weil and works council chairman Bernd Osterloh at an early stage about discrepancies in the software. In February 2017, he refused to testify before the Bundestag's investigative committee.

== Engineering ==
At Porsche, Piëch initiated significant policy changes within the company. For instance, starting with the 1967 Porsche 907, the driver's position in two-seat sports car racers was shifted from the left to the right, as this provided an advantage on predominantly clockwise race tracks.

After focusing mainly on producing small 2,000 cc (120 cu in) race cars that were intended to share parts and features with road cars, Porsche in 1968 made a bold and risky move by unexpectedly constructing the Group 4 Sportscars minimum of twenty-five Porsche 917s which allowed the use of 5,000 cc (310 cu in) engines instead of 3,000 cc (180 cu in) for prototypes, catching the rule makers at the FIA/CSI off guard. Even Enzo Ferrari had been compelled to sell his company to Fiat before making a comparable investment.

Always inclined to think on a grand scale, Piëch began the development of a 16-cylinder engine for the Can-Am series. It is perhaps no coincidence that his grandfather had designed a renowned supercharged 16-cylinder engine for the Auto Union racing cars in the 1930s. However, Piëch was not granted the opportunity to complete this project, as a turbocharged version of the existing 12-cylinder engine proved to be simpler, more powerful, and highly successful. Three decades later, as CEO of Volkswagen Group, Piëch championed the development of the extraordinarily ambitious Bugatti Veyron, featuring a turbocharged W16-cylinder engine with 1,001 horsepower (746 kW) and a top speed of 407 km/h (253 mph).

Although some of these specifications do not exceed those of the Porsche 917/30, they are still superior to most current racing cars.

== Porsche ownership ==
Piëch owned a significant share of Porsche, exactly 10%. In order to prevent discussions among the many family members, a policy was established in early 1972 that no Porsche or Piëch family member is allowed to be involved in the management of the company. Even company founder Ferry Porsche, Piëch's uncle, only held a seat on the supervisory board of Porsche after the company's legal form was changed from a limited partnership to a private legal company. This made Piëch move to Audi after the foundation of his engineering bureau.

In 2017, Piëch sold the majority of his ordinary shares in Porsche Automobil Holding SE to the Porsche and Piëch families. He also resigned from his position on the company's supervisory board.

== Personal life ==
Piëch had 13 children from four different women. He was married to his second wife Ursula Piëch from 1984 to his death, he lived with her in retirement in Salzburg, Austria. One of his sons, Toni Piëch, is the founder of car company Piëch Automotive. Piëch was dyslexic, and he had a vast car collection that included two Bugatti Veyrons regularly driven by him and his wife.

=== Death ===
Piëch collapsed suddenly on 25 August 2019 while having dinner with his wife in Aschau near Rosenheim, Oberbayern. He was rushed to hospital, where he was pronounced dead shortly thereafter. A specific cause of death was not released.

Both Lamborghini and Bugatti paid tribute to Piëch, first with the Lamborghini Sián FKP 37 that was unveiled in September 2019, whose name includes his initials and year of birth, and latest with the Bugatti F.K.P. Hommage in January 2026, which also includes his initials.

== Personality and management style ==
An engineer by trade, Ferdinand Piëch was both known for his intricate involvement in product development from a technical standpoint, as well as his domineering personality. Automotive blog Jalopnik said of Piëch, "He is the mad genius behind much of Porsche and Audi's racing successes as well as VW's all-out engineering and luxury push from the early 2000s. That's what gave us cars like the Bugatti Veyron and the 12-cylinder VW Phaeton." Fellow automotive executive Bob Lutz described Piëch as "one of the most successful leaders in the automotive business" and "the greatest living product guy" in the automobile industry.

Automotive News described Piëch as "a world-class eccentric but a figure of transcendent importance in the history of cars and car companies" who has had "The strangest and possibly most significant automotive industry career this side of Henry Ford". In their obituary, The Guardian said of Piëch, "His stewardship of VW has been indisputably successful. Piech will go down in history as an automotive legend, in the same class as Gottlieb Daimler, Henry Ford and Kiichiro Toyoda."

Piëch has been described as being socially awkward and having an abrasive personality; some automotive journalists who have encountered Piëch described him as being uncomfortable to be around. Automotive News once noted, "Many of his CEO peers said they could not hold a normal conversation with him. Discussions could be punctuated with long stretches of unexplained silence." Piëch himself has acknowledged that he occasionally struggles to relate to other people and understand their feelings.

As Piëch rose to the top of Volkswagen in the late 1980s and early 1990s, then-CEO Carl Hahn took notice of Piëch's poor social skills and tried to position him as a technocrat kept behind closed doors. Hahn was particularly bothered by how Piëch behaved during a visit to the Yasukuni Shrine; while a Shinto priest was showing the shrine's collection of vintage swords, Piëch examined one and told the priest that it was a fake. (Note: Piech was correct; The Emperor would later have the sword examined by experts and they confirmed that it was fake.) Subsequently, Hahn presented the Audi Avus quattro concept car himself at the 1991 Tokyo Motor Show and didn't allow Piëch to take part, which infuriated Piëch due to his extensive personal involvement in the Avus quattro's creation.

Piëch was widely interested in pushing technological boundaries in automotive development, especially as the head of Audi. Automotive News noted of this, "The company's slogan "Vorsprung durch Technik" was the personification of Piech – the belief that technology was the answer to all problems in the auto business. Audi was the test bed to prove his theory and the springboard for his ambition."

Piëch often spearheaded the development of audacious vehicles or oversaw business decision and strategies that baffled analysts, but still proved beneficial for the company as a whole. In recounting some of the extraordinary vehicles Volkswagen put in production under Piëch's watch, Wired noted that he alone pushed the Bugatti Veyron supercar into production, despite objection from other executives as well as the fact that Volkswagen lost what is believed to be millions on every Veyron sold: "Consider that for a moment. Long past the average retirement age, this gent greenlit one of the largest automotive losses in history and managed to keep his job. Moreover, he was hailed as a hero."

Piëch was known as an aggressive and demanding manager, who set both lofty and extremely specific goals and standards for projects. He would often become personally involved in vehicle development, such as how he oversaw the development of the Audi 100's aerodynamics himself, keeping it secret from even Audi's top engineers to prevent any crucial details of the car's aerodynamic capabilities from leaking to competitors.

Piëch often liked to ride along with automotive journalists during press test drives and would consider their critiques to improve Volkswagen's vehicles. Car and Driver writer John Phillips recounted how when he test drove the Volkswagen New Beetle during its launch in 1997, Piëch rode along and asked for his opinion on how its chassis and driving dynamics could be improved. Similarly, Piëch once demanded that an Automobile reviewer take the Volkswagen Phaeton up to its top speed while he rode along in the back seat.

With a leadership style described as "old fashioned", Piëch was known for his prolific firing of subordinates throughout his career, particularly how he engineered the ousting of former Volkswagen CEO Bernd Pischetsrieder and Porsche CEO Wendelin Wiedeking. According to Piëch, he fired any subordinate who "makes the same mistake twice". The Guardian noted, "Piech was known for his ability to outmanoeuvre competitors by stoking internal rivalries to his own advantage, even if it resulted in turning against his own managers, including the VW chief executive Bernd Pischetsrieder, to side with VW's labour leaders." Piëch leveraged this reputation to use threats and intimidation to get subordinates to meet his lofty goals; Wired described Piëch as "Machiavellian" and "an autocrat's autocrat".

Bob Lutz said of his management style, "It's what I call a reign of terror and a culture where performance was driven by fear and intimidation[...]That management style gets short-term results, but it's a culture that's extremely dangerous. Look at dictators. Dictators invariably wind up destroying the very countries they thought their omniscience and omnipotence would make great. It's fast and it's efficient, but at huge risk." He would also describe Piëch as a "mad genius" that while he respected, he would never want to work for or with at any capacity.

Lutz, CNBC, the American documentary TV series Dirty Money, among others, have claimed that the Volkswagen diesel emissions scandal is the result of the ruthless and tyrannical corporate culture Piëch installed at the company.

Although Piëch had tried a hostile takeover against Suzuki in 2010 and threatened its management, Suzuki won the case to terminate its partnership with Volkswagen at the International Court of Arbitration of the International Chamber of Commerce after Piëch fell from power, and could dissolve the capital tie-up until September 2015.

== Awards ==
- 1984: Honorary doctorate from the Vienna University of Technology
- 1999: Honorary doctorate from ETH Zurich
- 2001: Honorary citizen of Ingolstadt
- 2002: Honorary citizen of Wolfsburg
- 2014: Honorary citizen of Braunschweig
- In 1999, Piëch was named Automotive Manager of the 20th Century by the Global Automotive Elections Foundation
- In 2002, he received the Wilhelm Exner Medal
- In 2003, he received the Grashof Medal from the Association of German Engineers
- In 2011, he was awarded the title of "Auto Star of the Decade" by the trade and business newspaper Automobilwoche
- In 2011, Manager Magazin named Piëch the most important manager since 1971, recognizing his achievements for the German economy and the automotive industry.
- In 2012: Honorary Professor of Automotive Engineering at the West Saxon University of Applied Sciences of Zwickau
- In 2014: Honorary Senator of the Vienna University of Technology
- In 2014: Induction into the Automotive Hall of Fame
