= Susanne Porsche =

German film producer and investor (born 1952)

Susanne Porsche (née Bresser, born 4 June 1952 in Frankfurt) is a German film producer and investor.

Porsche began moderating TV shows for children on ZDF in 1979, but later decided to work behind the camera, directing and writing screenplays. From 1988 to 2008 she was married to Wolfgang Porsche, grandson of automotive pioneer Ferdinand Porsche. They have two sons. Since 2007, she lives with director Xaver Schwarzenberger.

== Business angel ==
In addition to her work in film and television production, Porsche invests in startup companies. Her involvement in the field is broad, ranging from Secucloud, a cloud-based security software, to Terraloupe, which analyzes aerial images with Artificial Intelligence, to Auticon, which exclusively employs people in the autism spectrum as IT consultants, and Pflegebox, which supplies the materials for home care and helps the customer to get the costs replaced by the health insurance. The entrepreneur received in 2018 the Goldene Aurora award, which is awarded annually by BAND (Business Angels Netzwerk Deutschland e.V.) and BAE (Business Angels Europe) to Europe's female business angel.

In 2018, Prof. Susanne Porsche was awarded the "Golden Aurora" as Europe's female business angel of the year.

Since 1999 she has been a member of the extended board of the Friends of the European Academy for Women in Politics and Business.
