= Ferry Porsche =

Austrian-German automobile designer

Ferdinand Anton Ernst Porsche
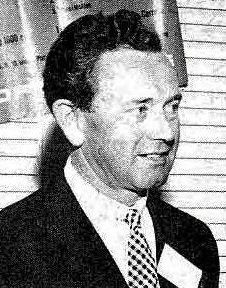
- Porsche in 1960
- Born: Ferdinand Anton Ernst Porsche; 19 September 1909; Wiener Neustadt, Austria-Hungary
- Died: 27 March 1998 (aged 88); Zell am See, Austria
- Other name: Ferry Porsche
- Occupations: Porsche AG designer and Chief Executive Officer
- Spouse: Dorothea Reitz (died 1985)
- Children: Ferdinand Alexander Porsche; Gerhard Porsche; Hans-Peter Porsche; Wolfgang Porsche
- Parents: Ferdinand Porsche (father); Aloisia Johanna Kaes (mother)
- Relatives: Louise Piëch (sister); Ferdinand Piëch (nephew)
- Family: Porsche

Ferdinand Anton Ernst Porsche (19 September 1909 – 27 March 1998), mainly known as Ferry Porsche, was an Austrian-German technical automobile designer and automaker-entrepreneur. He operated Porsche AG in Stuttgart, Germany. His father, Ferdinand Porsche, was also a renowned automobile engineer and founder of both Volkswagen and Porsche. His nephew, Ferdinand Piëch, was the longtime chairman of Volkswagen Group, and his son, Ferdinand Alexander Porsche, was involved in the design of the Porsche 911.

Ferry Porsche's life was intimately connected with that of his father, Ferdinand Porsche Sr., who began sharing his knowledge of mechanical engineering already in his childhood. With his father he opened a bureau of automobile design, in Stuttgart in 1931.

The Volkswagen Beetle was designed by Ferdinand Porsche Sr. and a team of engineers, including Ferry Porsche.

After World War II, while his father remained imprisoned in France being accused of war crimes, Ferry Porsche ran their company. Aided by the postwar Volkswagen enterprise, he created the first cars that were uniquely associated with the company. Despite the political-economical adversities of the postwar years, the company manufactured automobiles and, eventually, became a major sports car manufacturer.

== Early life ==
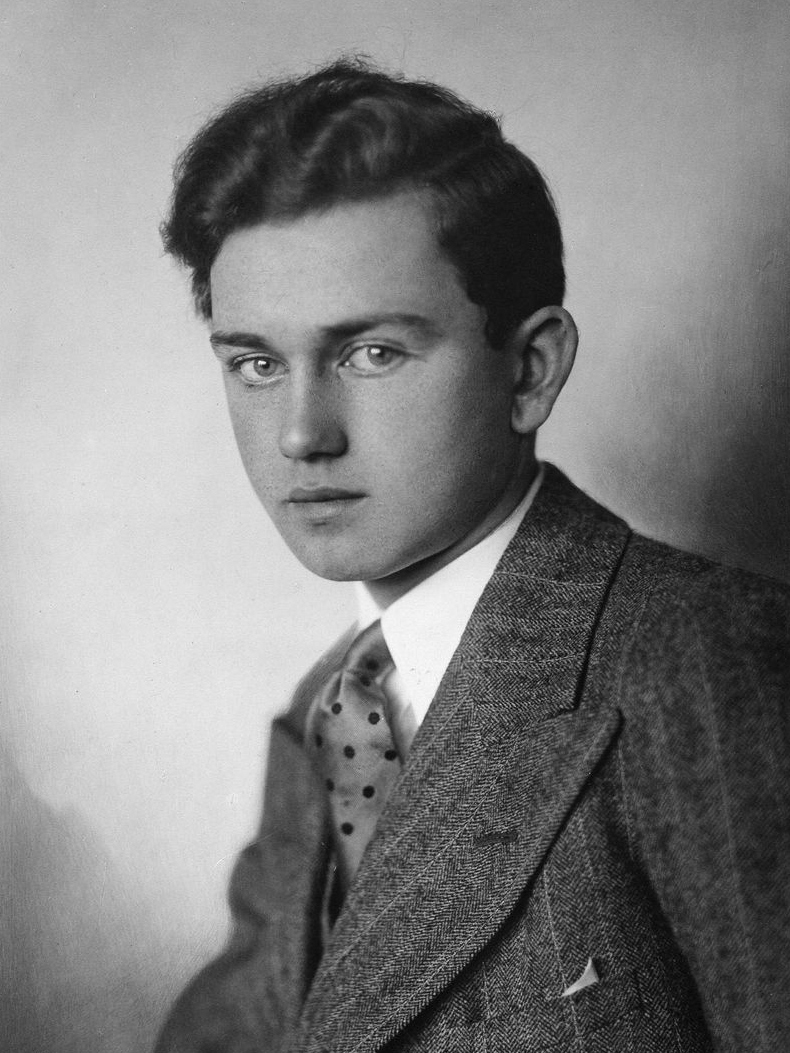
Young Ferry Porsche c. 1920

Ferdinand Porsche was chief designer at Austro-Daimler in Austria. His designs were focused on compact street cars and race cars. Austro-Daimler was so strongly tied to the local royalty that the Austrian double-headed eagle became the trademark of the company. The day Ferry Porsche was born, his father was competing with one of his race cars (called the Maja) at Semmering, finishing first in his class. He found out about his son's birth by telegram.

Ferry Porsche's mother was Aloisia Johanna Kaes. He had an older sister, Louise Piëch, who was five years his senior. He was baptised Ferdinand Anton Ernst Porsche, with the name Ferdinand after his father, the name Anton after his grandfather, and the name Ernst after his uncle on his mother's side. Early in his childhood, he picked up the nickname "Ferry" rather than the usual nickname "Ferdy", as Ferdy reminded his parents too much of a typical coachman nickname — a profession that, coincidentally, was made obsolete by the family's work.

During the following years, the family moved around a lot. He and his father spent much time together in workshops where he began early to learn about mechanical engineering. They also used to tour around Europe and the United States of America, where they raced the cars they designed.

Ferry remarked later, "...cars were my greatest passion from the very beginning.". For example, on Christmas Eve of 1920, Ferry Porsche was originally misled by his parents, who first presented him with a miniature coach pulled by a goat, while his real present was a petrol-driven miniature car with a four-stroke, two-cylinder engine specially designed by his father. Ferry Porsche learned to drive when he was only 10 years old. At age 12 he drove a real race car, the Austro-Daimler Sascha, which had just won its class at Targa Florio, Sicily, in 1922.

Ferry Porsche attended school at Wiener Neustadt and Stuttgart, concentrating on mathematics.

== Move to Stuttgart ==
In 1923, the family moved to Stuttgart, due to the elder Ferdinand's unrest about the poor financial condition of Austro-Daimler. He joined the Daimler Motoren Gesellschaft at Stuttgart-Untertürkheim (where the design department from the whole company was concentrated). Soon, he achieved the position of technical director.

Meanwhile, Ferry Porsche received consent from the company to stay at the plant together with his father because of his increasing interest in design issues. The local town authorities endorsed a special permission for him to drive, even at 16 years of age.

The elder Ferdinand enjoyed success particularly with his racing cars, which excelled at the race tracks. His personal preference for designing compact cars differed from the current policies of (now merged) Daimler-Benz, which were in favour of more luxurious Mercedes-Benz models.

So, in 1929, Daimler-Benz began to question Porsche's work seriously and halted it suddenly. He worked temporarily as the technical director of Steyr AG in Austria; nonetheless, he soon decided to open a consulting office of automobile design, again at Stuttgart.

At the same time, after finishing school, Ferry Porsche was residing in Stuttgart, where he began working for Bosch Company in 1928; this was to add depth to his interest in automobile engineering. In 1930, he was taking additional lessons in physics and engineering; however, he never formally enrolled in any university.

== Construction Bureau at Stuttgart ==
By the 1930s, Stuttgart had already established itself as a centre for the German automobile industry. It was thus an ideal location for the new Porsche design company. When Ferdinand Porsche opened his offices in April 1931, his son Ferry (then age 21) was by his side. The firm was called "Dr. Ing. h.c. F. Porsche GmbH Konstructionsbüro für Motoren, Fahrzeuge, Luftfahrzeuge und Wasserfahrzeugbau", meaning that Ferdinand Porsche's firm specialized in construction and consultation for engines, automobiles, airplanes, and motorboats. Porsche GmbH was founded in 1931 by Ferdinand Porsche, Dr. Anton Piëch and Adolf Rosenberger. While Rosenberger was the financial backer, he also brought technical knowledge and racing skill to the company. Father and son were accompanied by renowned engineers.

During the early 1930s, Germany's economic crisis was at its peak. The country was on the verge of political succession by the Nazis. In addition to the financial and political crises, Porsche also faced a lack of personnel, limiting the company's prospects initially.

Nevertheless, Porsche soon obtained contracts from important German automotive firms Wanderer, Auto Union, Zwickau, Zündapp and, starting in 1933, the Nazi government. Some of these projects had historical impact, such as the mid-engine Auto Union Silver Arrow race cars, designed by Porsche. By that time, a newspaper published that "in the automobile world, the name Porsche deserves a monument."

Ferry Porsche, at the time, managed departments "controlling of testing", "coordinating of the design engineers", and "keeping good relations with clients". On 10 January 1935, Ferry married Dorothea 'Dodo' Pauline Margrethe Reitz, whom he had first met at Daimler-Benz. The couple had four children: Ferdinand Alexander (born 1935), Gerhard (born 1938), Hans-Peter (born 1940), and Wolfgang (born 1943), and remained married until her death.

In 1938, when his father moved to the new Volkswagen plant at Wolfsburg, Ferry became deputy manager of the Stuttgart bureau and relocated the design departments to Stuttgart-Zuffenhausen.

=== Volkswagen ===
Ferdinand Porsche's dream had been to create a small compact car "from scratch", instead of a version derived from an existing sedan. The design work began at their familial residence in Stuttgart on Feuerbacher Weg. Ferry Porsche had complete access to help his father, intervening in important parts of the project. The work had originally been supported by Zündapp, until backing away soon after due to commercial reasons.

The German government accepted the project on 22 June 1934, interested in producing "an affordable car for the German family". Originally, it was called Porsche (Model) 60 but it was soon officially renamed as the KdF-Wagen or Volkswagen (people's car). In the family's garage in Stuttgart, three prototypes were built.

In 1939, when the Volkswagen factory opened in Wolfsburg, Porsche senior became its general manager, along with an officer from the Nazi party.

=== Auto Union and Wanderer ===
The German government had also decided to promote German race cars at the Grand Prix Motor Racing competitions. Therefore, the government had called for a concourse of the state-of-the-art racers of the time. Daimler-Benz easily won a bid. When Wanderer applied, it was rejected. Wanderer resorted to the Porsche firm.

In 1932, Ferdinand Porsche met with Adolf Hitler personally, and their bid was accepted. Ferry Porsche took part in the conception and construction of those race cars, and was also responsible for the general organization of the workshop and the testing of units. In 1933, their first race car was developed with a 4.5 litre V-16 engine and an aluminum framework.

In 1934, Wanderer and others merged to form Auto Union, and the senior Porsche became the chief designer of their race cars. Both racing teams, Daimler-Benz and Auto Union, were also used for political propaganda by the National Socialists. They overwhelmingly dominated all the competitions of the 1930s. In 1938, Ferdinand Porsche senior left the Auto Union racing team when his contract expired.

== Second World War ==
Porsche volunteered to join the SS on 17 December 1938, later claiming, falsely, that he had been conscripted by Himmler to design the Schwimmwagen. He would continue to deny having volunteered until his death. To avoid the aerial bombings of Stuttgart, Ferry Porsche was forced to bring some of the design departments to Austria, to two locations, Gmünd/Carinthia and Zell am See, where the family had a farm. Nonetheless, he stayed personally in Stuttgart, managing the business where factories were staffed with slave labour.

Meanwhile, Porsche senior continued on at Wolfsburg, working for the Germans until the end of the war. The production of compact civilian cars at that factory had been halted to produce small military cars called Kübelwagen.

Though after the end of WWII, the French government formally requested that the Porsche family build a French version of the compact Volkswagen in November 1945.

A group of French producers, led by Jean Pierre Peugeot, resisted this. During an official appointment at Wolfsburg, both Porsches, father and son, as well as Anton Piëch, a Viennese attorney who was Louise Porsche's husband, were arrested together as criminals of war, on December 15. Without any trial, a bail of 500,000 francs was officially asked for each of the Porsches. It could be afforded only for Ferry Porsche, who moved to Austria in July 1946. His father was taken instead to prison at Dijon.

== Porsche company at Gmünd ==
After his release, Ferry Porsche attempted to return to Stuttgart, but he was barred by the occupation forces. In consequence, in July 1946, he brought all the structure of the company to Gmünd/Carinthia, Austria.

Together with his sister Louise, Ferry took over the management of the company. Early on, the workshop was primarily used for automotive repair. Additionally, they commercialized water pumps and lathes.

In time, they obtained two contracts for automobile design. One was for the construction of racecars for the Cisitalia racing team. The other was for the design of their own car, which later became known as the Porsche 356.

=== Porsche Type 360 - Cisitalia ===
As a result of Carlo Abarth's mediation, Ferry Porsche inked a contract with Piero Dusio to produce Grand Prix racing cars again. The new model was called the Porsche 360 Cisitalia, and it was the first to spell out the name of the family's enterprise. Its design was mostly similar to the preceding pre-war ones, despite being smaller. It had a supercharged mid-mounted engine displacing 1.5 litres and four-wheel drive.

=== Porsche Type 356 ===
Following his father's old aspiration, Ferdinand Porsche designed the Porsche 356, with a unique chassis and body while using Volkswagen components. The 356 had an air-cooled, rear-mounted, 4-cylinder engine producing 35 hp. Due to the location of its engine, the car was a little unstable, but the balance favoured potency and light weight.

An automobile dealer from Zürich ordered the first shipment in the winter of 1947, and production of the automobile began. Under Ferry Porsche's supervision, the units were built completely by hand at an improvised workshop inside a sawmill at Gmünd.

By June 1948, 50 aluminium-bodied units had been completely assembled. Additionally, 6 frameworks were sent to the Beutler Company at Thun, Switzerland, where they were fitted with cabriolet bodies.

Despite its compact size, the car was popular with wealthy customers. If successful, the 356 would mean Porsche's final hop out from performing only designing chores for others. Indeed, surprisingly, the 356 remained in production for many years and by 1965 had sold nearly 78,000 units. Additionally, it laid the framework which was followed by the entirety of the successive series of Porsche's sports cars.

== Ferdinand's fate ==
During his 20 months of jail time in Dijon, Porsche senior collaborated on designs for Renault and their later popular 4CV. It is speculated that the conditions of his imprisonment contributed to his health decline.

In 1947, Ferry gathered the amount of the stipulated bail immediately after receiving the early fees for his new designs. His father was then released on 1 August 1947, along with Anton Piëch.

Once in Austria, Porsche senior reviewed the designs of his son for both projects; the 360 Cisitalia and the 356. He consented to the plans and aided the projects which were in progress. He commented daily to their employees that he "would have done the same designs as Ferry".

As Ferdinand's health further declined, Ferry took him to revisit Wolfsburg's plant, which was flourishing with the massive production of the Volkswagen Beetle—which was carried out under the supervision of the British occupation. In November 1950, the elder Ferdinand suffered a stroke, which disabled him until his death on 30 January 1951, aged 75.

== Return to Stuttgart ==
In the spring of 1949, the general manager of Volkswagen, Heinz Nordhoff, approached junior Ferdinand Porsche and unpacked a massive contract. For Porsche's designing services—for example, improving the Beetle—, it specified that Volkswagen would start providing in exchange:

- a share of the profits from each Beetle sold
- the raw materials for building the sport Porsche's vehicles
- the usage of Volkswagen's world structure of retailers
- the usage of Volkswagen's world structure for technical service

Also by this agreement, junior Ferdinand Porsche would become the only dealer of Volkswagen for all of Austria.

In view of this new stabilized situation, junior Ferdinand Porsche decided to reestablish the headquarters of the Porsche at Stuttgart-Zuffenhausen. Though the old original Porsche's facilities were occupied by American forces. Nonetheless, he rented some workshops then from the company Reutter (which was a constructor of bodies for automobiles). He brought most of his employees and opened in September 1949. Their first work was the development of an engine which was called Carrera.

In 1950, the production of the Porsche 356 resumed. Eventually, it was so successful that, despite being originally planned an annual production of 500, they had already produced 78,000 units by 1967. Ferdinand Porsche's motto was to produce automobiles which had to be reliable and of high-quality sports cars, of a high utilitarian value.

Porsche's most recognized involvement in car races began at 24 Hours of Le Mans, in June 1951, when an improved version of the 356 debuted on this track and won in its category. On successive years, Porsche's winning contribution to Le Mans is regarded as fundamental for the existence of the circuit. Later, in 1959, Porsche won for the first time an event of the World Sportscar Championship, at Targa Florio, while a Porsche 917 would finally achieve the first Le Mans win in 1970.

=== Porsche - Type 911 (1963) ===
At the demand of Porsche's fans, the company began planning a successor to the 356. The project was originally called Porsche 901. Ferdinand Alexander Porsche (who was also nicknamed "Butzi") and Ferdinand Porsche's nephew took charge of designing the new model.

The first units were manufactured in 1962. However, Peugeot pushed legally for a change of the name, due to its registered trademark on automobile names with a zero amid two numbers. The model was renamed Porsche 911. Over time, it has evolved, but still kept the general shape and architecture since the beginning, with a rear-mounted high-performance engine. On 11 May 2017, the millionth example was built.

== Porsche plc ==
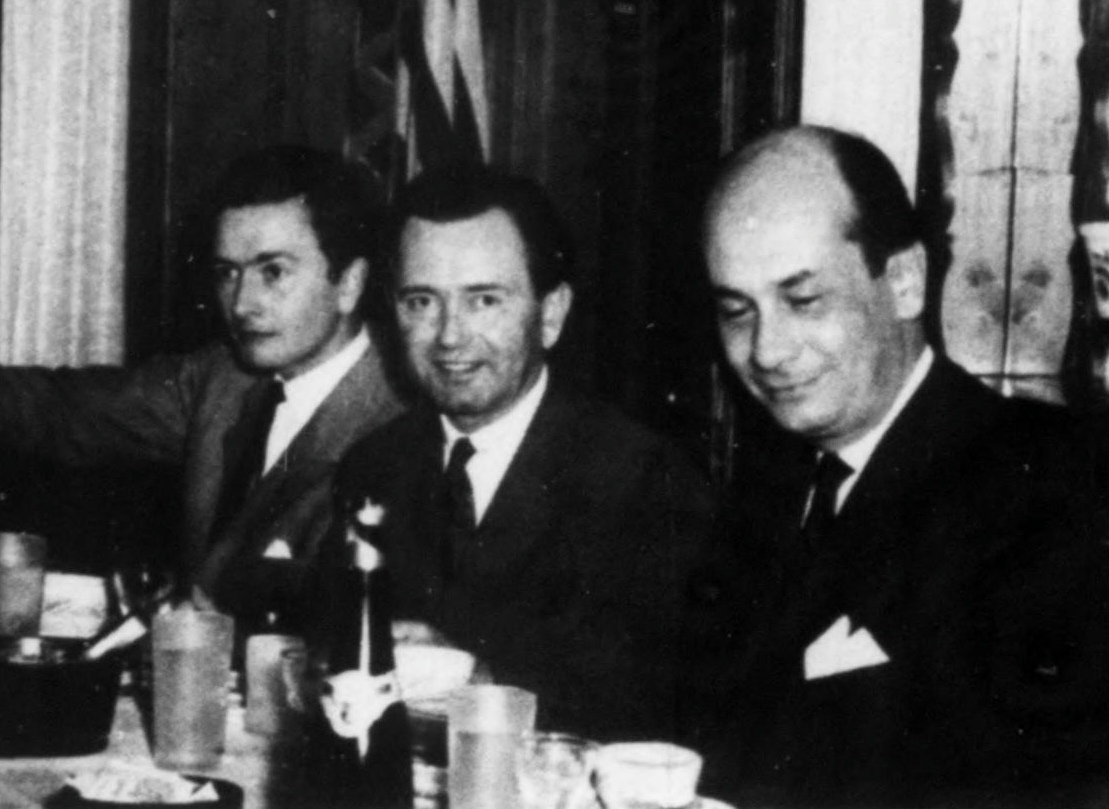
Ferry Porsche (center) at Michigan Club dinner meeting in 1958.

Following his father's death in 1951, Ferry Porsche was the most responsible official of the company, as general manager, the chairman of the board of management. In 1972, he decided to transform the Porsche Company (which was a limited partnership) into a public concern, also by merging all three enterprises which constituted it:

- Dr. Ing. h.c. F. Porsche KG, from Stuttgart
- VW-Porsche Vertriebsgesellschaft, from Ludwigsburg
- Porsche Konstruktion KG, from Salzburg

Additionally, Ferdinand Porsche stepped down from the chairmanship and became honorary chairman of the supervisory board. In fact, he continued controlling the company as such. He remained in that position until his death in 1998. Ferdinand Alexander Porsche took his place as general manager.

The enterprise became a public limited company (plc), Porsche GmbH. Nevertheless, the two deeply seated families, Porsche and Piëch, assured the possession of most of the shares. This status has also been kept through the years, until recently.

== Later years ==
In 1989, Ferdinand Porsche retired definitively from involvement with the company he created, returning to his cherished Austrian farm at Zell am See.

Later, one of his last visited events was the launching of a new model, the Porsche 911 Carrera Cabriolet. It was based on the old 356, with a 300 hp 6-cylinder air-cooled engine.

He also assisted in the large celebration of the 30 years of the Porsche 911, which took place in Stuttgart and Ludwigsburg. Despite being in an unhealthy condition, he signed autographs and drove through a street of 500 911s. He supported himself with a cane and was wearing a straw hat.

Ferdinand Porsche died 74 days short of the 50th anniversary of the company, at the age of 88, on 27 March 1998, at the farm in Zell am See, Austria. He was buried there at the Schüttgut church, beside his parents, his wife Dorothea and Anton Piëch. Porsche AG conducted a memorial service soon after in Stuttgart.

== Recognitions ==
- 1959. Grand Cross for Distinguished Service, from the Federal Republic of Germany. It was presented by President Theodor Heuss.
- 1965. Honorary doctorate, from the Vienna Technical College.
- 1965. Honorary doctorate, from the University of Stuttgart.
- 1984. Honorary professor, from the federal state of Baden-Württemberg.
- 1975. Grand Golden Decoration, from Austria. It was presented at Vienna.
- 1979. Wilhelm Exner Medal.
- 1979. Grand Cross for Distinguished Service, from the Federal Republic of Germany. It's the highest award for service. It was presented at his 70th birthday by the chief minister of Baden-Württemberg, Lothar Spath.
- 1981. Gold Medal, from the Societe des Ingenieurs de L'Automobile.
- 1981. Honorary citizenship (dubbed "Freedom of the City"), from the town of Zell-am-See, at Austria.
- 1984. Professor. It was presented by the chief minister, Lothar Späth.
- 1985. Honorary senator, from the University of Stuttgart.
- 1989. Economic Medal for outstanding service to the economy of Baden-Württemberg. It was presented by the Minister of Economy of Baden-Württemberg, Martin Herzog.
- 1989. Citizen's medal, from the city of Stuttgart.
- 1994. Honorary citizenship, from Wiener Neustadt.
