= Volkswagen Golf Mk2 =

Second generation of Golf compact car

Volkswagen Golf Mk2 (19E)
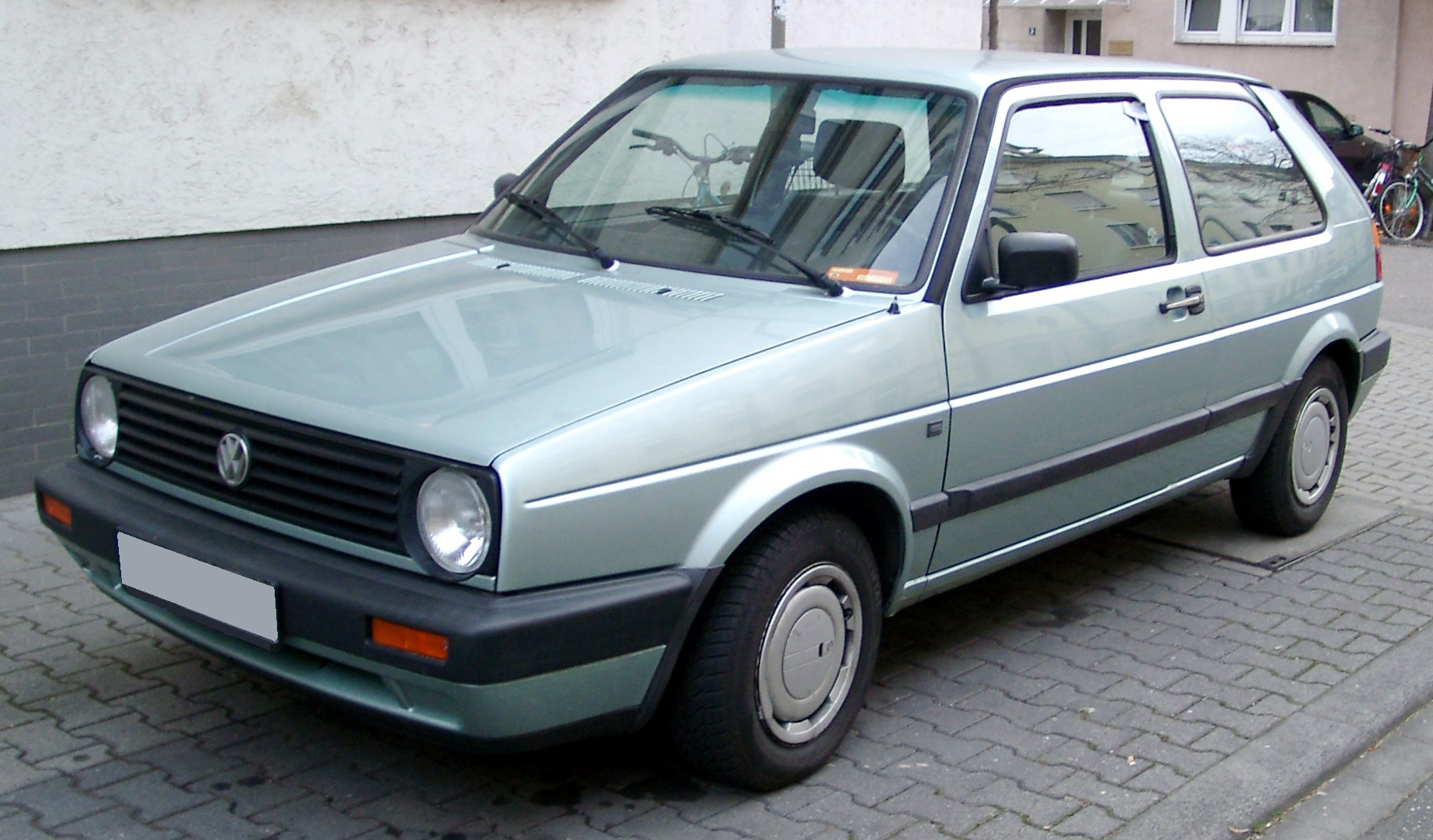

Overview
- Manufacturer: Volkswagen
- Production: September 1983–1992; 1985–1992 (Yugoslavia); 6.3 million units
- Assembly: Germany: Wolfsburg; Germany: Zwickau (Volkswagen Zwickau-Mosel Plant); Belgium: Brussels; Yugoslavia: Sarajevo (TAS); United States: New Stanton, Pennsylvania (Westmoreland Assembly); Mexico: Puebla; South Africa: Uitenhage; Austria: Graz (Golf Country only)
- Designer: Herbert Schäfer

Body and chassis
- Class: Small family car (C)
- Body style: 3-door hatchback, 5-door hatchback
- Layout: Front engine, front-wheel drive / four-wheel drive
- Platform: Volkswagen Group A2 platform
- Related: Volkswagen Jetta; Volkswagen Corrado; SEAT Toledo Mk1 (1G)

Powertrain
- Engine: petrol: 1.05 L EA111 I4; 1.3 L EA111 I4; 1.6 L EA827 I4; 1.8 L EA827 8V/16V I4; 1.8 L EA827 SC I4; 2.0 L EA827 16V I4; diesel: 1.6 L EA827 I4; 1.6 L EA827 turbo I4; Electric motor
- Transmission: 4-speed manual 5-speed manual 3-speed automatic

Dimensions
- Wheelbase: 2,470 mm (97.2 in)
- Length: 3,985 mm (156.9 in)−4,054 mm (159.6 in)
- Width: 1,665–1,700 mm (65.6–66.9 in)
- Height: 1,415 mm (55.7 in)
- Curb weight: 725–1,245 kilograms (1,598–2,745 lb)

Chronology
- Predecessor: Volkswagen Golf Mk1
- Successor: Volkswagen Golf Mk3

The Volkswagen Golf Mk2 is a hatchback, the second generation of the Volkswagen Golf and the successor to the Volkswagen Golf Mk1. It was Volkswagen's highest volume seller from 1983 and ended (German) production in late 1992, to be replaced by the Volkswagen Golf Mk3. The Mk2 was larger than the Mk1; its wheelbase grew slightly (+ 75 mm (3.0 in)), as did exterior dimensions (length + 180 mm (7.1 in), width + 55 mm (2.2 in), height + 5 mm (0.2 in)). Weight was up accordingly by about 120 kg (260 lb). Exterior design, developed in-house by VW design director Schäfer, kept the general lines of its Giugiaro-designed predecessor, but was slightly more rounded. All told, about 6.3 million second-generation Golfs were built.

== Overview ==
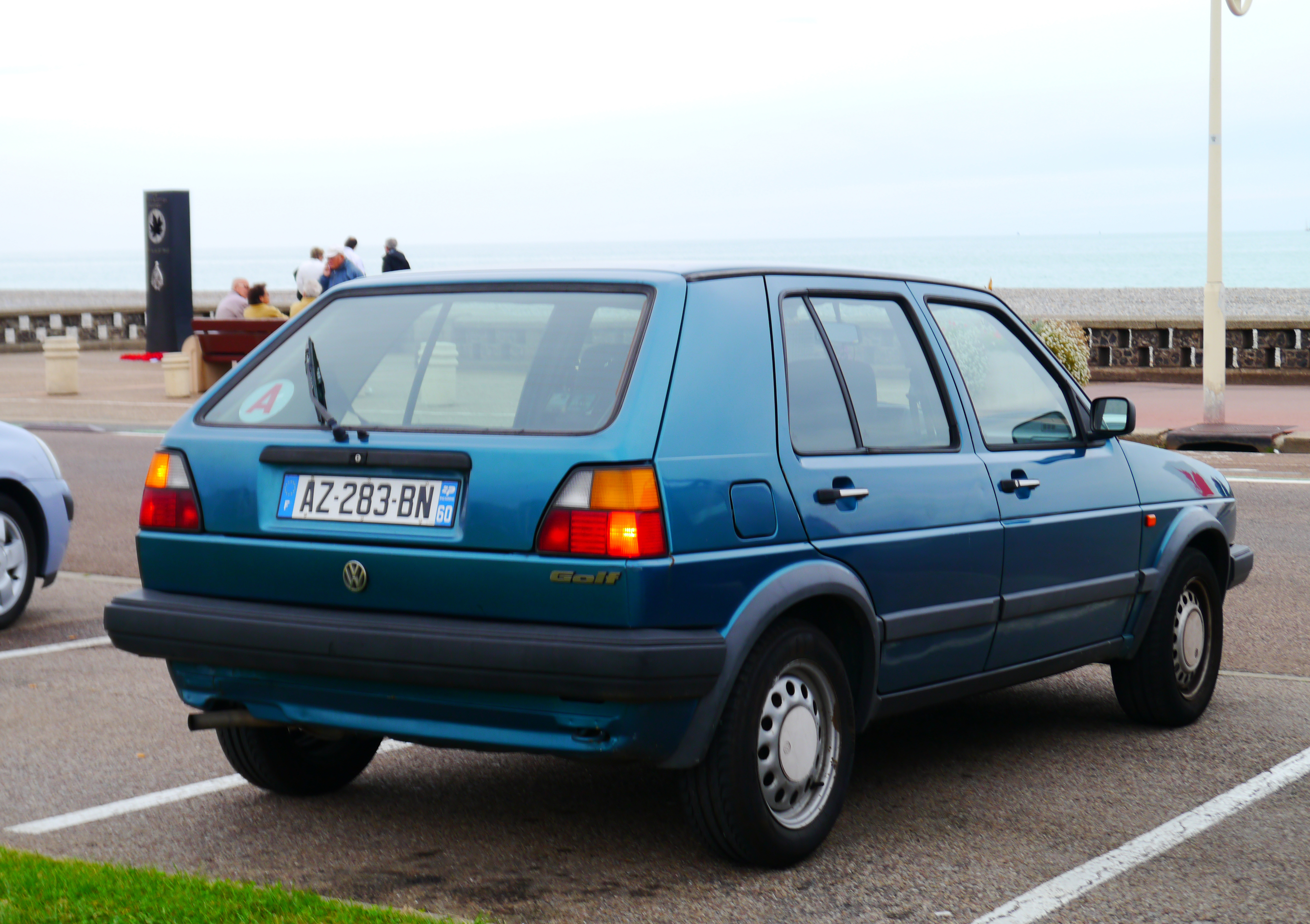
VW Golf 5-door.

The second-generation Volkswagen Golf (also known as the Typ 19E until the 1991 model year, and Typ 1G thereafter) was launched in Europe at the Frankfurt Motor Show in September 1983, with sales beginning in its homeland and most other left-hand drive markets soon after. It debuted in March 1984 on the right-hand drive British market, and it was introduced as a 1985 model in the United States. It featured a larger bodyshell, and a wider range of engine options, including a GTD turbodiesel (in Euro markets, later using the 1.6 "umwelt" (ECO) diesel engine), a DOHC 1781 cc (1.8) 16-valve version of the straight-four GTI (as well as the tried and tested 1781cc (1.8) 8v GTI), the supercharged 8v "G60" with front- and four-wheel drive options, and a racing homologated variant of this, the "Rallye Golf". This model was intended to be sold in the United States as well (badged as "Rallye GTI"), and prototypes were made, but it did not come to be.

The original Golf had been one of the few front-wheel drive hatchbacks on sale when launched in 1974, but within a decade almost all mainstream manufacturers had launched a Golf-like family hatchback. Ford had switched to front-wheel drive hatchback format for its MK3 Escort in 1980, soon after General Motors had adapted that concept for its latest Opel Kadett (Vauxhall Astra in Britain). Austin Rover (formerly British Leyland) did not enter the small family hatchback market until the launch of its Maestro at the beginning of 1983, although it had launched its larger Maxi hatchback as long ago as 1969 and in 1976 had taken the then unusual step of launching a hatchback bodystyle on a luxury car (the Rover SD1). Peugeot would not launch its first Golf-sized hatchback (the 309) until late 1985, but it had taken ownership of Chrysler's European division (which it renamed Talbot) in 1978, just after the launch of the Chrysler/Simca Horizon hatchback. However, the likes of Fiat, Renault and Volvo had all entered the small family hatchback market by the end of the 1970s. The hatchback bodystyle had also become popular on cars produced outside Europe, particularly on Japanese models.

In 1985, British motoring magazine What Car? awarded the Golf Mk2 1985 "Car of the Year", even though it had actually been launched on the UK market early in the previous year. It sold well in Britain, peaking at more than 50,000 sales a year by the end of the decade.

However, the Golf was overshadowed in the 1984 European Car of the Year contest, finishing third but being heavily outscored by the victorious Fiat Uno and runner-up Peugeot 205, which were similar in size to Volkswagen's smaller Polo.

During the life of the Golf MK2, there were a number of external style revisions. Notable changes to the looks of the Golf MK2 included the removal of quarterlight windows in the front doors, and the introduction of larger grille slats with the August 1987 facelift. The most notable was the introduction of so-called "Big Bumpers", which were introduced in the European market with an August 1989 facelift. They were available in the United States from August 1989 as well, as part of the "Wolfsburg Edition" package. They were not standardized until January 1990.

This Golf was marketed for the first time with that name in the United States and Canada. The Rabbit name used on the Mk1 was meant to give a car a cuddly image, but with the 1980s redesign of the car, Carl Hahn, the former Volkswagen of America president who was now chairman of the whole company, dictated that Volkswagen model names be standardized globally. James Fuller, head of the Volkswagen brand in North America, concurred in using the Golf name to stress the car's Teutonic character. The GTI body kit became available on a non-injection Golf and was sold as the "Driver" trim level in Europe. While the GTI remained a trim level in the Golf lineup in Europe, in some markets, it was (and continues to be) marketed as a separate model line.

The MK2 Golf remained in production until the launch of the MK3 model in August 1991. Continental sales began that autumn, but the MK3 did not take over from the MK2 on the right-hand drive British market until February 1992.

== Models ==
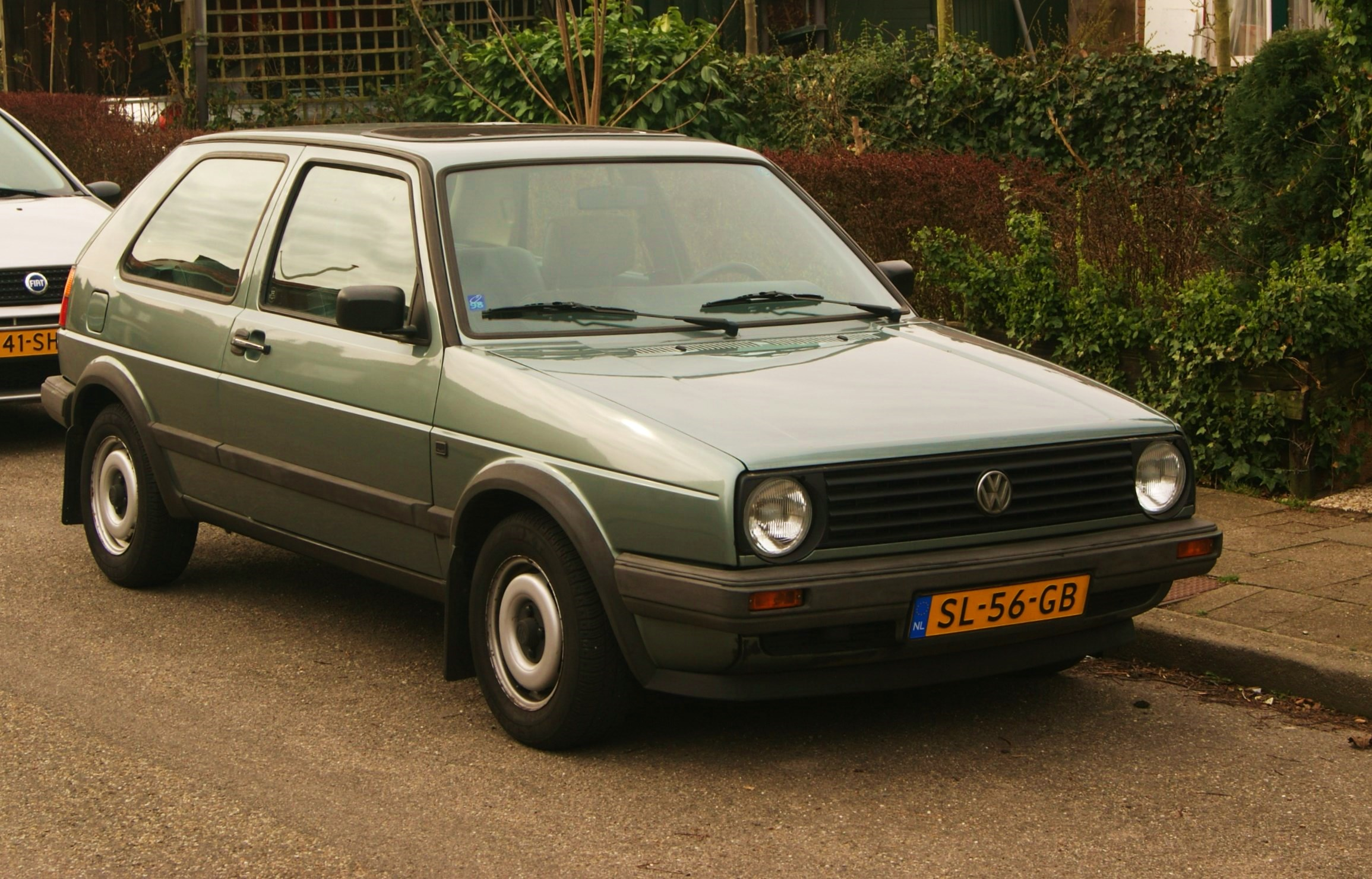
1987–1989 Volkswagen Golf II (3-door)

The Golf Mk2 was available as a 3- and 5-door hatchback. The 2-door and 4-door sedan variants of the Golf Mk2 were marketed under the Volkswagen Jetta name. No cabriolet version was developed from the Mk2; instead, the Mk1-based convertible continued to be produced, with minor changes.

Trim levels included base, C, CL and GL and initially a range-topping Carat model (until 1986), later a GT (in 1987) version was also on offer. In North America, there was only a base model until 1986, in 1987 a GL and GT model, in 1988–1989, there were all three, and in 1990 until the end of its run there was again only a GL. The GTI model existed from 1985 to 1987, and again from 1990 to 1992, and the GTI 16v existed from 1987 to 1992. In Japan the range consisted of catalysed Ci/CLi/GLi models all sharing the same 1.6 or later 1.8 liter fuel-injected inline-four engines. In the course of the years, a host of "limited edition" models appeared on various markets, distinguished by cosmetic changes and/or an enriched features list. Generally, these were option packages on top of a base "model" (CL, GL, etc.). Also in some countries it could be found trim level TX (Austria) and JX (Yugoslavia).

The base engine was initially the 1.3 option as used in the first generation Golf, accompanied by 1.6- and 1.8-litre petrol fours and 1.6-litre naturally aspirated or turbocharged diesel engines. In January 1984 a new base engine was introduced, a 1.05 litre inline-four mainly available in Italy and Greece. In North America, all Golf Mk2s had 1.8-liter petrol or 1.6 diesel engines (the GTI, while not a Golf model in North America, also had a 2.0-liter model).

The MK2 was the last version of the Golf to feature carburettor petrol engines, as all versions of the MK3 came with fuel injection from its launch, to meet requirements that all new cars sold in the EEC after 1992 must be fitted with a catalytic converter or fuel injection.

=== Golf GTI & GTI 16v ===
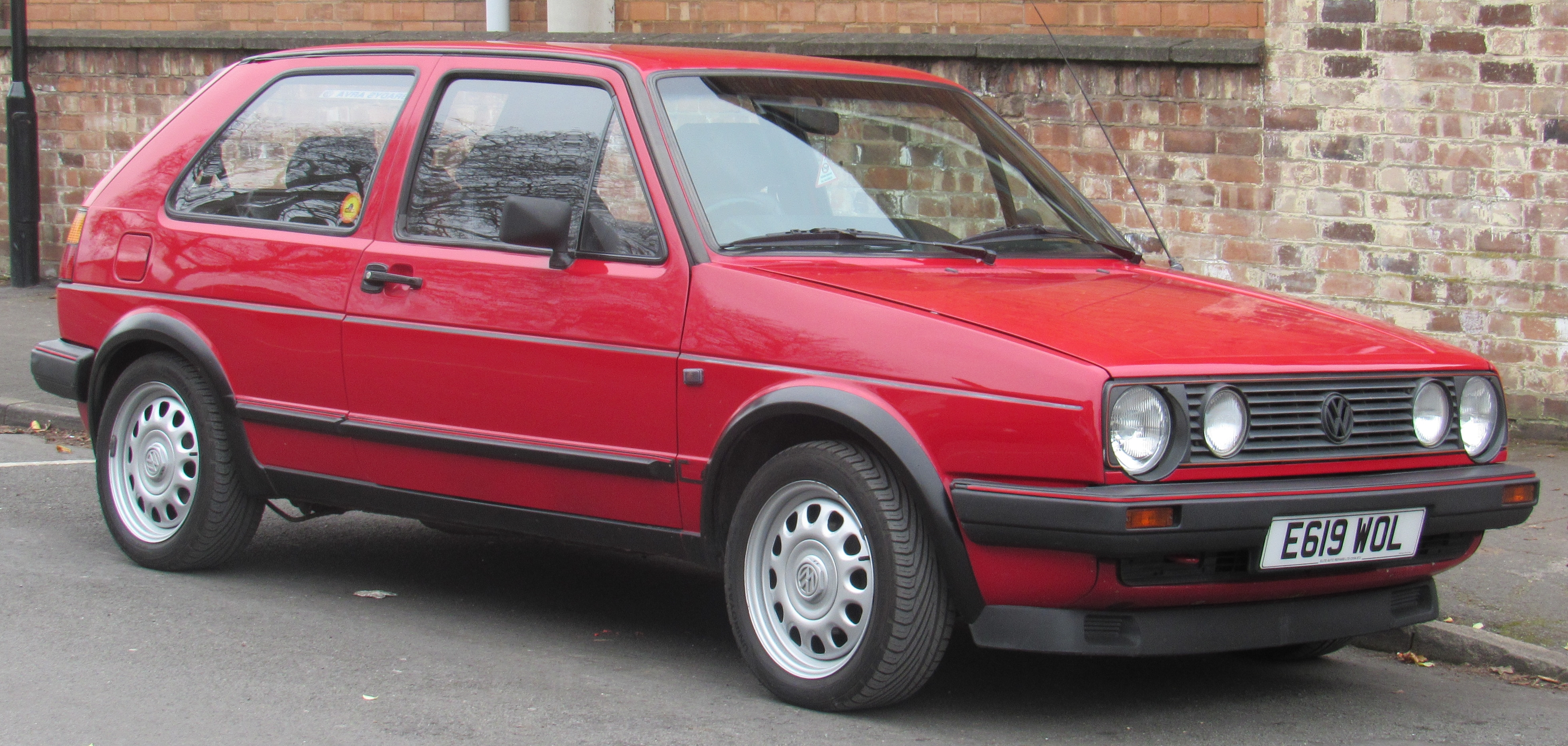

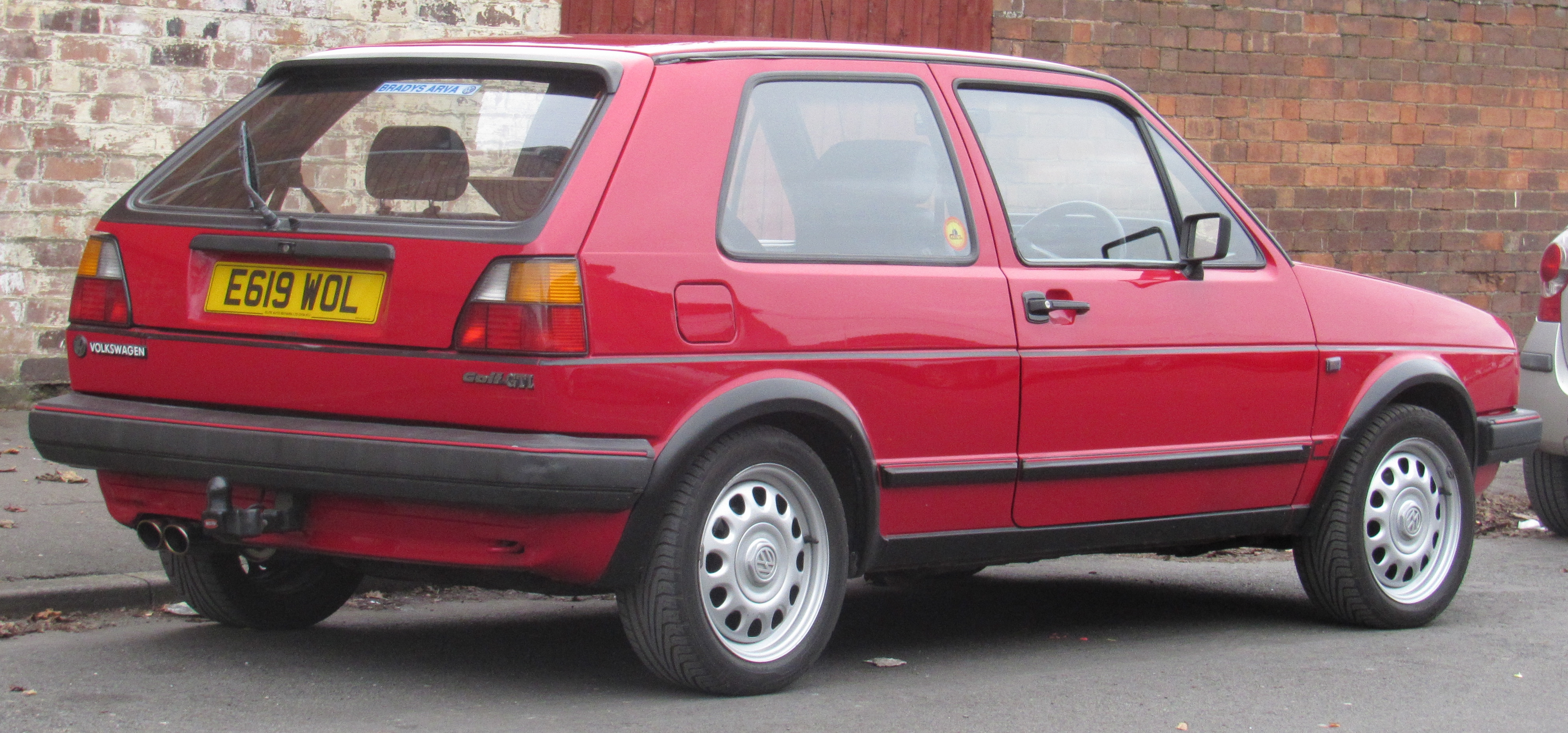
1987 Volkswagen Golf GTI 3-door (UK)

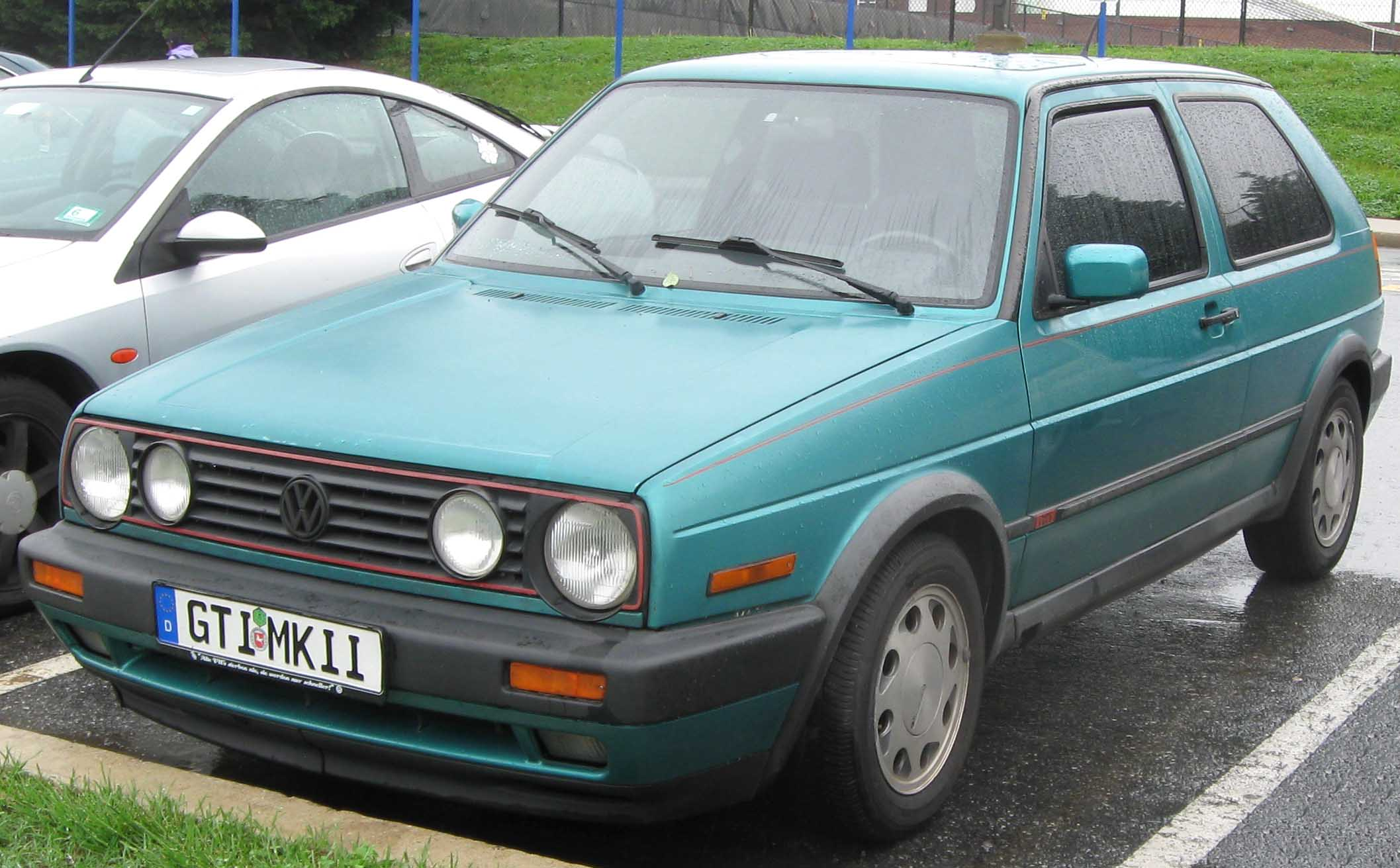
1990–1992 Volkswagen GTI 3-door (US)

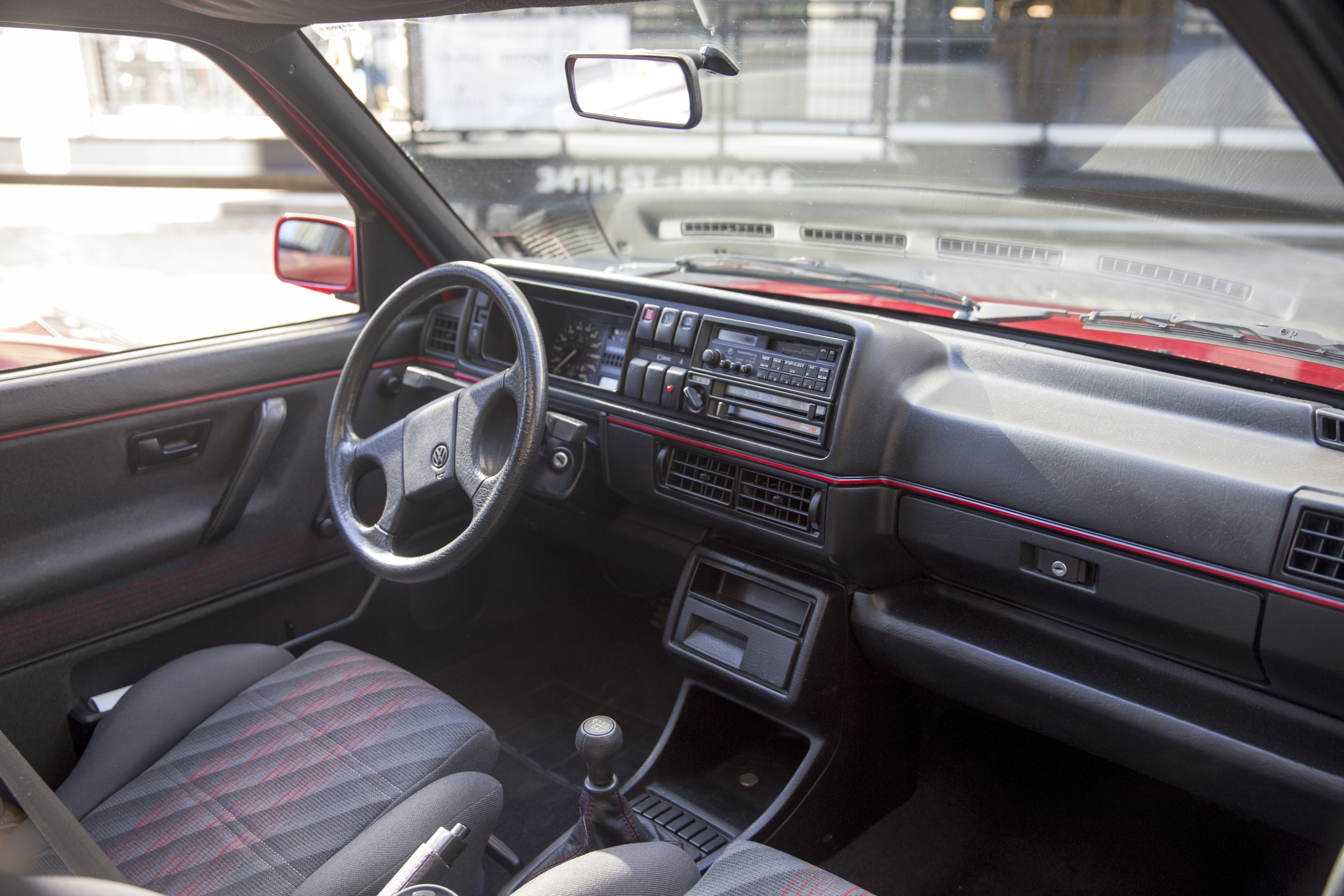
Interior (US-market 1992 GTI)

The successful Golf GTI (or, in the US, simply "GTI") was continued with the Mk2 as a sporty 3- or 5-door hatchback. Like late Mk1 GTIs, it featured a naturally aspirated Bosch K-Jetronic fuel injected 1781 cc inline-four engine developing 112 PS (82 kW; 110 hp). In 1986 (1987 for North America) a Golf GTI 16V was introduced; here the 1.8 litre engine output was 139 PS (137 hp; 102 kW) at 6,100 rpm (or 129 PS (95 kW) for the catalyst version) and 168 N⋅m (124 lb⋅ft) at 4,600 rpm of torque, the model was marked by discreet red-and-black "16V" badges front and rear. North American-market GTIs were later equipped with 2.0-liter, 16-valve engines, only available in the Passat and Corrado outside North America. In 1990, like the Golf, the GTI was given a facelift, and the "Big Bumper" became standard on all GTIs. This was maintained through the rest of the Mk2 model era. In 1990 the GTi G60 was also introduced featuring the 8v 1.8 with a G60 supercharger this version is not to be confused with the very rare G60 Limited (see below).

For the South African market, Volkswagen SA added a 2.0 8v engine in January 1992, the same engine which would go on to be used in the Mk3 model launched later that year.

=== Golf Syncro ===
In February 1986, Volkswagen presented the first Golf with four-wheel drive. This Golf Syncro was available as a five-door with the 90 PS (66 kW) 1.8 engine only, later with 98 PS (72 kW). Its 4WD system had been developed in collaboration with Steyr-Daimler-Puch of Austria, and featured a viscous coupling and flexible partition of torque between front and rear axle - up to 48% to the rear. Due to its high price (in 1986, a Syncro cost about 30% more than an equivalent front wheel drive model) the model remained rare; from 1986 to 1989, for instance, just 16,000 Syncros were built. Fewer than 1,000 were sold on the UK market.

The four-wheel-drive system was fully automatic and minimally intrusive, also in appearance. Aside from a few discreet "Syncro" badges there was no way to tell. There were no additional gauges or buttons in the interior either. The gearing was lowered somewhat, to mask the performance losses due to the additional 160 kg (353 lb). The rear seat was moved forward 30 mm (1.2 in), and the cargo floor was raised, making the luggage compartment 25 percent smaller than in a regular Golf.

=== Rallye Golf ===
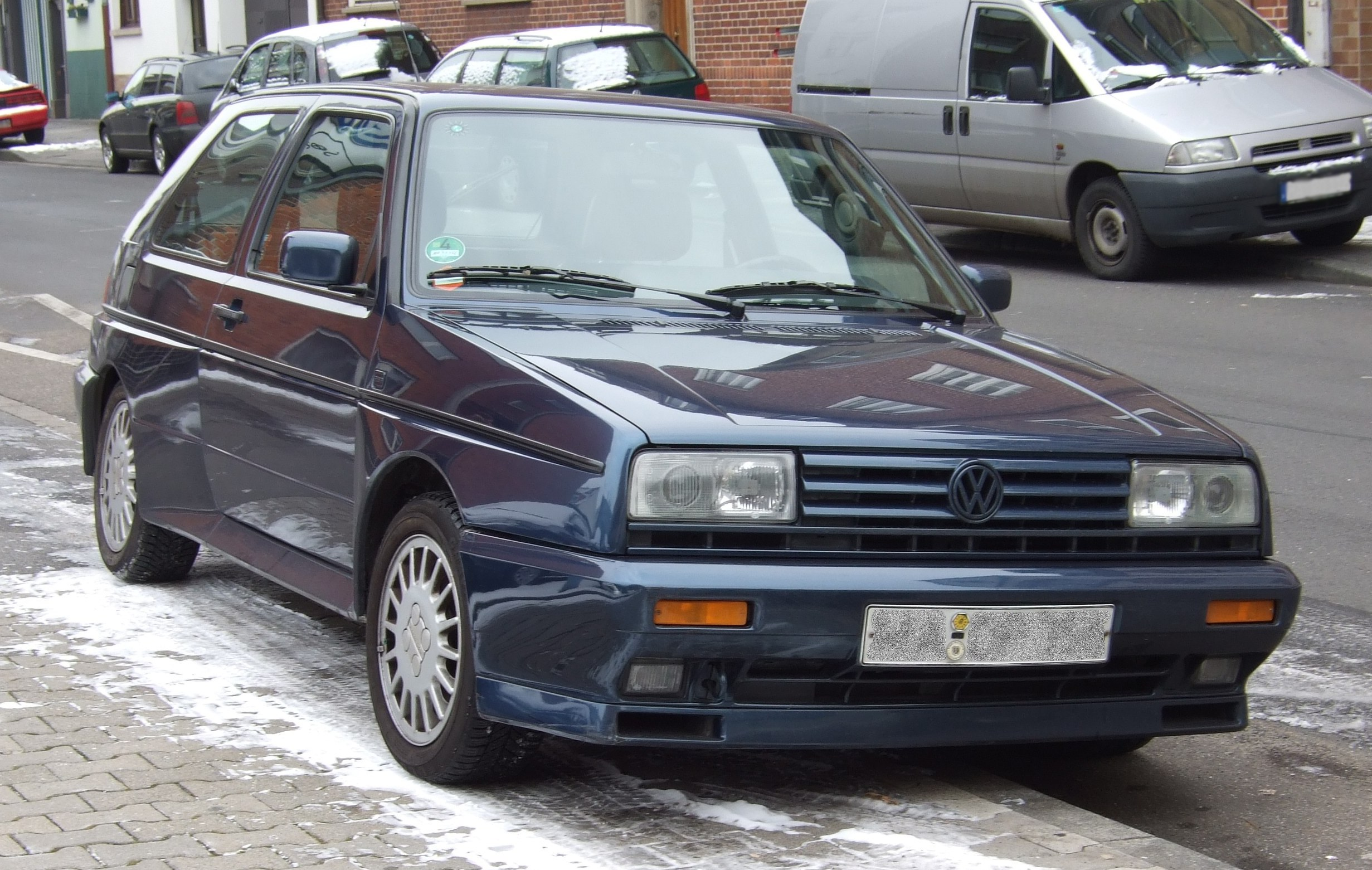
Rallye Golf

In 1989, the Rallye Golf appeared as a rallye "homologation special" for Group A rallying. Distinguishable by its box-flared wheel arches and rectangular projector headlamps, this model featured Syncro four-wheel drive, a cable shifted transmission and a G-supercharger 1763 cc, marginally less than the standard 1781 cc to enable the car to enter in the sub 3-litre class for Group A rallying.

Five thousand cars were built in Volkswagen's Brussels, Belgium, plant, priced at about DM 50,000 each (or roughly twice as much as a base Golf GTI). The Rallye Golf has 160 PS (118 kW; 158 hp). The Homologation was completed on 1 December 1989.

None were officially sold in the US. Two were sent over officially for testing, with five sent over for evaluation. Volkswagen of America vice-president James Fuller was a supporter of its addition to the U.S./Canadian lineup. Fuller died in December 1988 while flying home from Germany aboard Pan Am Flight 103, when a bomb planted by Libyan terrorists exploded over Lockerbie, Scotland; this had a detrimental effect on the Rallye Golf's chances of importation to North America.

Eventually, Volkswagen of America decided that the Rallye Golf would be too expensive to offer for sale in North America, where Volkswagen was perceived as a low-cost brand.

VW Motorsport entered the WRC from 1990-1991 with limited success, the best finishes being a third place on the 1990 Rally New Zealand and a fifth place on the 1990 Tour De Course Rally. Limited budget compared to the larger teams meant development time was small.

VW Motorsport pulled out of the WRC at the end of the 1990 season, however, they did enter the 1991 German Rally Championship (Deutsche Rallye Meisterschaft), in which they won both the drivers' and manufacturers' titles.

=== Golf Limited ===
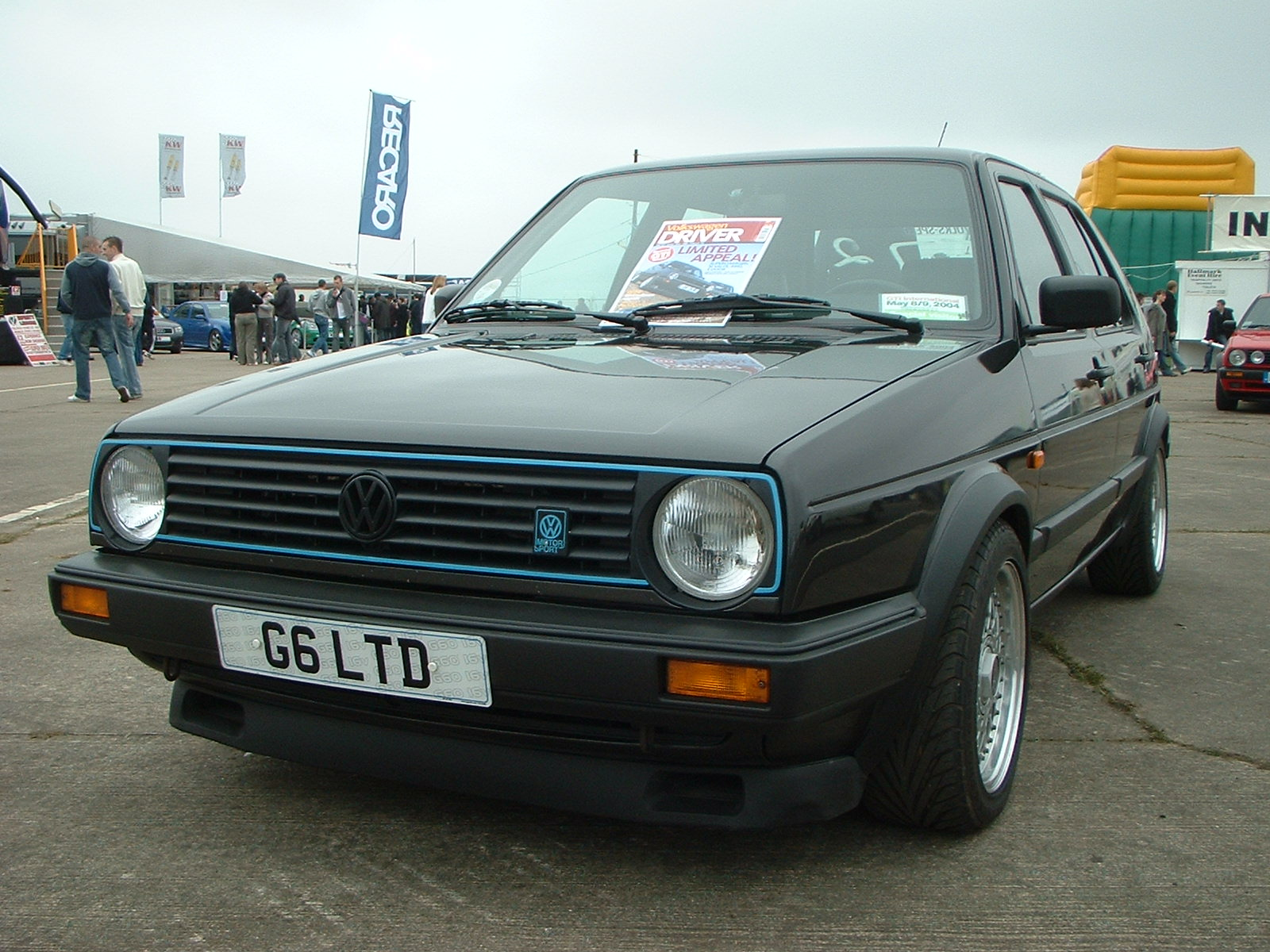
Volkswagen Golf Limited

Based on the Rallye Golf, a very limited edition Golf Mk2 variant exists, combining all of the high-line options (such as leather interior with heated and height adjustable front seats, 4 electric windows, electric mirrors, ABS, power steering and sunroof) available at the time. Designed and hand-built by the Volkswagen Motorsport division, only 71 of the "Golf G60 Limited" models were produced. The exclusive feature package included a G60 supercharged version of the 16-valve engine, mated to a sports transmission and Syncro four-wheel drive mechanism driving BBS RM012 wheels in 6.5Jx15". The cars were mainly built around the stronger, more angular 5-door chassis, with two 3-door models also produced. Externally, it featured US bumpers, a plain black grille with unique blue detail with VW Motorsport and black VW badging, Hella tinted taillights, motorsport badges, and a special numbered plaque. In 1989, these cars cost in the region of DM 68,500 each and were primarily sold to VAG executives and management. These cars produce 210 PS (154 kW) 252 N⋅m (186 lb⋅ft) and accelerated from 0–100 km/h (0-62 mph) in 6.4 seconds, making them the most powerful VW Golf ever produced until VW released the Mk4 R32 with 241 PS (177 kW) in 2003.

=== Golf Country ===
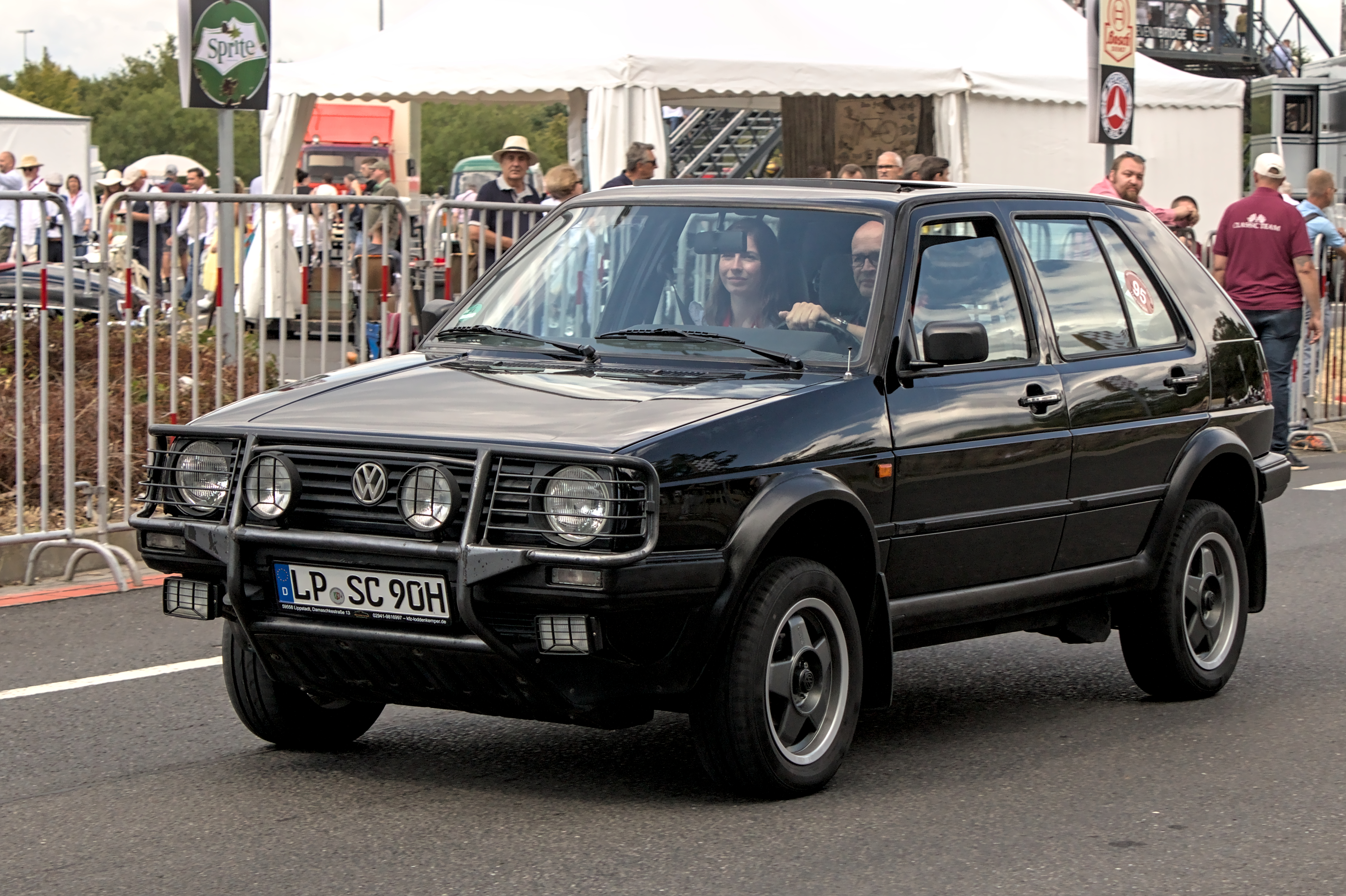
Golf Country

There was also a version called Golf Country (7,735 cars built), co-manufactured by Steyr-Daimler-Puch in Austria, designed for medium off-road driving. It had more suspension travel, Syncro four-wheel drive, improved ground clearance of 21 cm (8.3 in), bullbars at front and rear (generally over a single headlight grille), a skid plate for protecting the engine area, sub-frame to protect the rear Syncro differential and propshaft and a spare wheel mounted externally on a swing-away triangular frame on the back.

In Europe, it was offered with the acclaimed 98 PS (72 kW) 1.8 8v 1P petrol engine. There were also: 1500 "Country Allround" designed to appeal to a wider public, made without the electric luxuries like electric and heated mirrors, leather steering wheel and bullbar without headlight grills, in relation to a more affordable price range; 558 " Country - Chrompaket" with Chrome bullbars, Sliding sun roof, Engine and interior pre-heater and beige leather interior; and 50 "Country GTI" 112 PS (82 kW) 1.8 GTI petrol engine, made only for Golf Country project VW-staff. The Golf Country was particularly popular in Alpine regions in central Europe.

The Golf Country's powertrain was also used in the Biagini Passo, a compact convertible crossover built in Italy.

=== Golf Mk2 citySTROMer ===
In 1984 Volkswagen, in cooperation with RWE, released the second generation Golf citySTROMer, an electric version of the Mk2 Golf. It was the first electric Volkswagen to enter serial production as the Mk1 citySTROMer was only a prototype vehicle. The Mk2 citySTROMer had a range of approximately 50 km (31 mi) and used 16 gel-electrolyte batteries mounted under the cargo area and rear seats. Just 100 Mk2 citySTROMers were produced and sold for 45,000DM (~US$34,000) until production ceased in 1985. The citySTROMer name was continued in later models; the Jetta citySTROMer and the Mk3 Golf citySTROMer.

== Engines ==
Engine designation	Production	Displacement	Engine code (family)	Power	Torque	Compression ratio
1.0	1984–1985	1,043 cc (63.6 cu in)	GN (EA111)	45 PS (33 kW; 44 hp) at 5,500 rpm	74 N⋅m (55 lb⋅ft) at 3,600 rpm	9.5:1
1.0	1985–1987	1,043 cc (63.6 cu in)	HZ (EA111)	50 PS (37 kW; 49 hp) at 5,900 rpm	76 N⋅m (56 lb⋅ft) at 2,800 rpm	9.5:1
1.3	1983–1987	1,272 cc (77.6 cu in)	HK/MH (EA111)	50 PS (37 kW; 49 hp) at 5,200 rpm	76 N⋅m (56 lb⋅ft) at 2,800 rpm	9.5:1
1.3	1987–1992	1,272 cc (77.6 cu in)	NZ/2G (EA111)	55 PS (40 kW; 54 hp) at 5,000 rpm	95 N⋅m (70 lb⋅ft) at 3,000 rpm	9.5:1
1.6	1983–1991	1,595 cc (97.3 cu in)	EZ (EA827)	75 PS (55 kW; 74 hp) at 5,000 rpm	125 N⋅m (92 lb⋅ft) at 2,500 rpm	9.0:1
1.6	1986–1990	1,595 cc (97.3 cu in)	RF (EA827)	72 PS (53 kW; 71 hp) at 5,200 rpm	120 N⋅m (89 lb⋅ft) at 2,700 rpm	9.0:1
1.8	1983–1991	1,781 cc (108.7 cu in)	GU (EA827)	90 PS (66 kW; 89 hp) at 5,200 rpm	145 N⋅m (107 lb⋅ft) at 3,300 rpm	10.0:1
1.8 G60	1988–1991	1,781 cc (108.7 cu in)	PG (G60)	160 PS (118 kW; 158 hp) at 5,600 rpm	225 N⋅m (166 lb⋅ft) at 4,000 rpm	8.0:1
1.8 G60 Limited	1990	1,781 cc (108.7 cu in)	3G (G60)	210 PS (154 kW; 207 hp) at 6,500 rpm	252 N⋅m (186 lb⋅ft) at 5,000 rpm	
1.8 GTI	1983–1992	1,781 cc (108.7 cu in)	EV/PB (EA827)	112 PS (82 kW; 110 hp) at 5,500 rpm	153 N⋅m (113 lb⋅ft) at 3,100 rpm	10.0:1
1.8 GTI 16v	1986–1991	1,781 cc (108.7 cu in)	KR (EA827)	139 PS (102 kW; 137 hp) at 6,100 rpm	168 N⋅m (124 lb⋅ft) at 4,600 rpm	10.0:1
1.8 Rallye	1988–1989	1,763 cc (107.6 cu in)	1H (G60)	160 PS (118 kW; 158 hp) at 5,800 rpm	225 N⋅m (166 lb⋅ft) at 3,800 rpm	8.0:1
1.8 Syncro	1986–1989	1,781 cc (108.7 cu in)	RP (EA827)	90 PS (66 kW; 89 hp) at 5,250 rpm	142 N⋅m (105 lb⋅ft) at 3,000 rpm	9.0:1
1.6 Diesel	1983–1991	1,588 cc (96.9 cu in)	JP (EA827)	54 PS (40 kW; 53 hp) at 4,800 rpm	100 N⋅m (74 lb⋅ft) at 2,300 rpm	23.5:1
1.6 Turbo Diesel	1983–1991	1,588 cc (96.9 cu in)	JR (EA827)	70 PS (51 kW; 69 hp) at 4,500 rpm	133 N⋅m (98 lb⋅ft) at 2,600 rpm	23.0:1
1.6 Turbo Diesel Cat.	1989–1992	1,588 cc (96.9 cu in)	SB (EA827)	80 PS (59 kW; 79 hp) at 4,500 rpm	140 N⋅m (103 lb⋅ft) at 2,300 rpm	23.0:1
North American market
1.8	1985–1987	1,781 cc (108.7 cu in)	GX	85 hp (63 kW; 86 PS) at 5,250 rpm	130 N⋅m (96 lb⋅ft) at 3,000 rpm	9.0:1
1.8 (Canada, leaded)	1985–1989	1,781 cc (108.7 cu in)	MZ	90 hp (67 kW; 91 PS) at 5,500 rpm	133 N⋅m (98 lb⋅ft) at 3,250 rpm	9.0:1
1.8 GTI	1985–1991	1,781 cc (108.7 cu in)	HT	100 hp (75 kW; 101 PS) at 5,500 rpm	142 N⋅m (105 lb⋅ft) at 3,000 rpm	10.0:1
1.8 GTI	1985–1991	1,781 cc (108.7 cu in)	RD	102 hp (76 kW; 103 PS) at 5,250 rpm	149 N⋅m (110 lb⋅ft) at 3,250 rpm	9.0:1
1.8	1987–1992	1,781 cc (108.7 cu in)	RV	100 hp (75 kW; 101 PS) at 5,400 rpm	148 N⋅m (109 lb⋅ft) at 3,800 rpm	10.0:1
1.8	1985–1991	1,781 cc (108.7 cu in)	PF	105 hp (78 kW; 106 PS) at 5,400 rpm	155 N⋅m (114 lb⋅ft) at 3,800 rpm	10.0:1
1.8 16v	1986–1989	1,781 cc (108.7 cu in)	PL	123 hp (92 kW; 125 PS) at 5,800 rpm	163 N⋅m (120 lb⋅ft) at 4,250 rpm	10.0:1
2.0 16v	1990–1992	1,984 cc (121.1 cu in)	9A	134 hp (100 kW; 136 PS) at 5,800 rpm	180 N⋅m (133 lb⋅ft) at 4,400 rpm	10.0:1
1.6 Diesel	1985–1992	1,588 cc (96.9 cu in)	ME	52 hp (39 kW; 53 PS) at 4,800 rpm	96 N⋅m (71 lb⋅ft) at 2,500 rpm	23.0:1

== North America ==
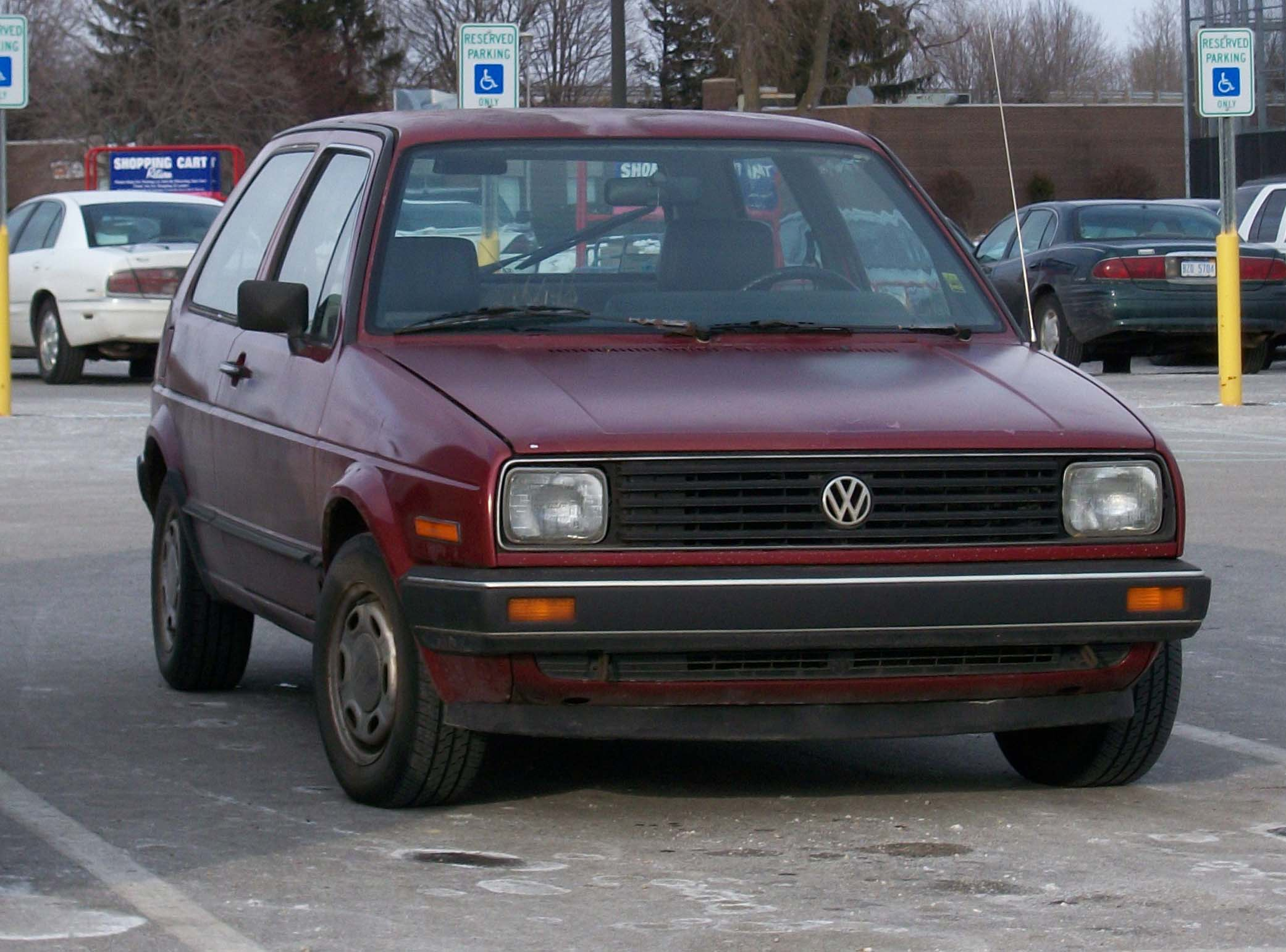
1985–1986 Golf 3-door (US), with the early square headlights

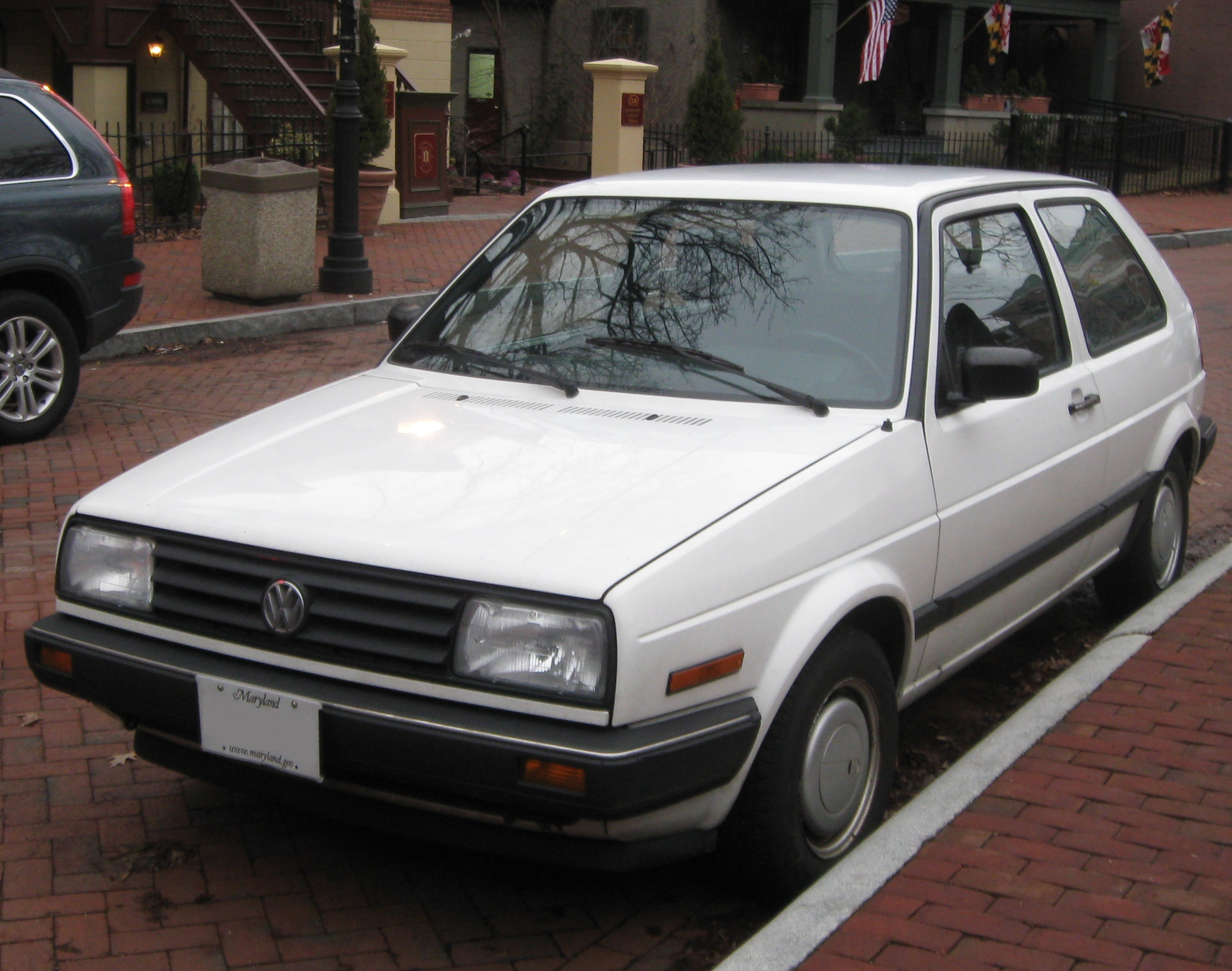
1988–89 Volkswagen Golf 3-Door (US)

As with the North American Rabbit, the second-generation Golf was produced for North America in Pennsylvania. When sales in North America failed to live up to expectations and with increasing productions costs, the Westmoreland Assembly Plant was closed in July 1988. Subsequent Golfs sold in North America came from the Puebla assembly plant, in Mexico. The Mk2 Golf was discontinued in Europe in 1991, but Mexican-made Mk2 models remained available in North America for another year.

In its first years on sale in North America, 1985 and 1986, the Golf II maintained sealed-beam square headlights, while the GTI bore flush headlights (from the Jetta). All Golfs gained the flush "aerolamps" in 1987 after a design freshening to move it more upscale in the wake of the introduction of the Brazilian-built Fox (Voyage in Brazil) in North America. This is also the reasoning for the model being called "Golf GL", while virtually no equipment changes occurred. The 1985 U.S. models are easy to distinguish from subsequent models due to the absence of a high-mounted brake light; these became required of all cars sold in the U.S. for 1986.

The GTI was Motor Trend magazine's Car of the Year for 1985, as well as VWVortex's "Best Golf of all time".

In its first year on sale in the U.S., Golf sales were eight percent below those of the 1984 Rabbit. Sales of the all-new 1985 Jetta, by contrast, skyrocketed compared with the 1984 model. In 1986, the Jetta became VW's bestseller in North America, a position it has held ever since.

As with the Mk1, there was a "warm hatch" version known as the Golf GT. Introduced in 1987, it featured the GTI's exterior styling, namely the red stripe exterior trim, and wheel-arch spoilers but with a standard 1.8 L engine, available in an automatic and with 5 doors (unlike the GTI). It only lasted for a few years, but with the reintroduction of the GTI in 1989 (the GTI 16v was produced continuously from 1987 to 1992), this model bore the concept. Year by year, the GTI with the 8 valve engine lost its GTI-like features, getting standard Golf brakes in 1990, suspension in 1991, losing the MFA computer, and finally being optional with an automatic, a first in GTI history. All GTI models got the European quad-headlight grille with the upgrade to big bumpers in 1990.

A 2.0 L engine producing 134 horsepower (100 kW) replaced the 1.8 in 1990–1992 North American 16V models. This version included 15" 2pc BBS RM wheels. In the interior, the Recaro seats no longer had vinyl bolsters of earlier GTIs.

=== Mexico (1987–1992) ===
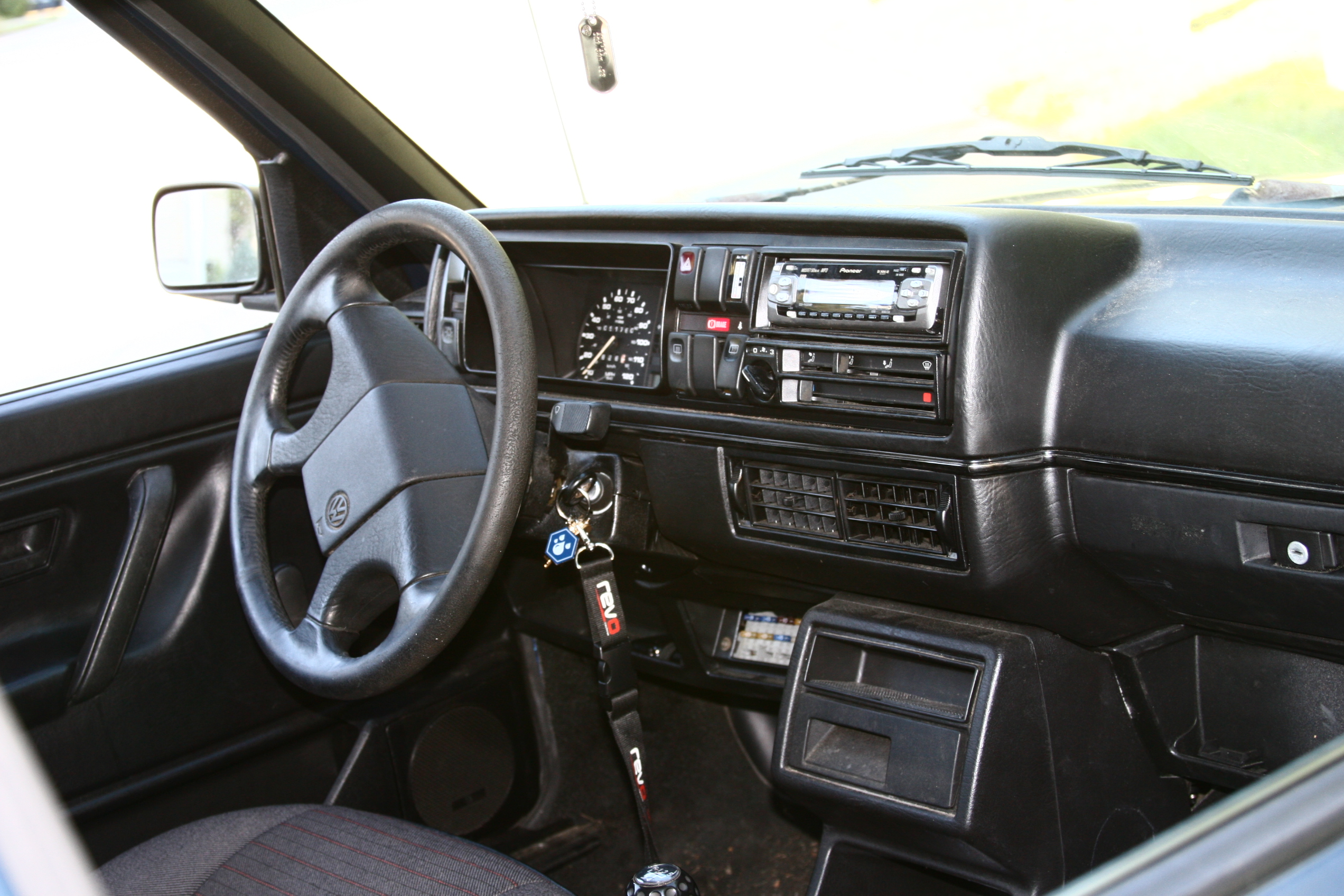
Interior of the Mark 2

The Golf Mk2 was introduced in Mexico in March 1987 to replace the successful Caribe (Golf Mk1). It was available with two variants of the 1.8-litre engine: A 72 hp (54 kW), and the 85 hp (63 kW) previously used in the Caribe GT, the Atlantic GLS, and the Corsar. It came in C, CL and GL trims, with a 4-speed manual gearbox for the lesser engine (C and CL), and a 5-speed manual or optional 3-speed automatic for the more powerful Golf GL. Tires for the C and CL were 155 SR 13, and P 175/70 R 13 for the GL. In 1988 the Golf received the same modifications as in Europe, but for the nameplates (which changed for 1989). In 1989 a GTI version was introduced with a 105 hp (78 kW) "Digifant" fuel injected variant of the 1.8-liter engine with no catalytic converter.

In early 1992, the MkII Golf was replaced by the MkIII.

== Other markets ==
=== Japan ===
In Japan, all models were sold with fuel injected and catalyzed engines as the CLI and GLI, with the GTI model also available. Sales were bolstered due to the Golf's compliance with Japanese Government dimension regulations. In 1982, the Golf was joined by the Polo in Japan which was also in compliance.

=== United Kingdom ===
Sales in the UK were strong; though it never quite made the top 10 for sales in any of the eight years in sale, it came close. In 1990, it was the UK's 12th most popular car with almost 50,000 sales. As of 2012, over 20 years after the Mk2 Golf's demise, it is still a very common sight on British roads and is being recognized by many as a growing classic.

=== Yugoslavia ===
Volkswagen also produced the Mk2 Golf in Yugoslavia, in a factory at Vogošća near Sarajevo, called Tvornica Automobila Sarajevo (TAS). Following on from the production of the Mk1 Golf at the factory, the Mk2 was produced from June 5, 1985, with a yearly production of 25,000 units, and plans had been made to start production of the Mk3 Golf amid the Bosnian War in 1992, however the factory was destroyed by bombing that year. The Mk2 Golf was produced by TAS only for the six Yugoslav republics, with a rear badge J, JX (which stands for less equipment than C and CL), C and CL and TAS badge on the front grille and Sarajevo city logo instead side blinkers. Such models were usually very poorly equipped, with the passenger-side rear-view mirrors being optional equipment which had to be paid for. Engines were 1.3 (carburettor), 1.6 petrol and 1.6 diesel.

== See also ==
- Changes (advertisement)

Preceded by Volkswagen Golf Mk1	Volkswagen Golf Mk2; 1983–1992	Succeeded by Volkswagen Golf Mk3
