= Dauch =

Dauch may refer to:

- Dauch Corporation, a Detroit-based auto parts manufacturer
- Richard E. Dauch, a co-founder of Dauch Corporation
