= James McLernon =

American businessman (1927–2020)

James Wright McLernon (August 7, 1927 – March 21, 2020) was an American automobile company executive who worked for Chevrolet while at General Motors as an engineer. Born in Kenmore, New York, he became the first president in 1976 of manufacturing at Volkswagen of America, the U.S. division of Volkswagen AG. He was assigned to get VW's Westmoreland Assembly Plant, the first factory in the United States operated by a non-American automaker, up and running in 1978 and then became president of VW's entire American division. His role at Volkswagen was controversial, due to the softening of the Volkswagen Rabbit (known in Europe as the Golf), to make the car appeal to a mass market. He was fired by Carl Hahn when Hahn became the chairman of Volkswagen AG in 1982.

McLernon died March 21, 2020, at Beaumont Hospital, Royal Oak, Michigan and was buried at Acacia Park Cemetery, Beverly Hills, Michigan.

== Sources ==
- University of Buffalo, Alumni Profiles, Fall 1998: James W. McLernon, Class of 1950
- Kiley, David, "Getting The Bugs Out: The Rise, Fall and Comeback of Volkswagen in America", Adweek, 2002
