= Pittsburgh Technology Center =

American office park

Coordinates: 40.4326°N 79.963°W

Pittsburgh Technology Center (PTC) is an office park located in the South Oakland neighborhood of Pittsburgh, Pennsylvania. PTC, on the 48 acre site of a former Jones and Laughlin Steel Mill, is a hub of advanced academic and corporate technology research. More than 1,000 people work on site which has become an attractive location for knowledge workers in Pittsburgh's new economy. The center was budgeted at $56.8 million ($131 million today) during the summer of 1991. The total development cost, including public and private investment, exceeded $104 million. The Pittsburgh Life Sciences Greenhouse operates wet lab space in its Bridgeside Point I business incubator that has been responsible for assisting over 24 companies. The $46.5 million 150,000 Bridgeside Point II began construction in 2007.

PTC is considered to be one of the best examples of brownfield redevelopment in the United States.

== History ==
The site that now contains the Pittsburgh Technology Center was originally occupied by the Pittsburgh and Boston Copper Smelting Works, later called C.G. Hussey and Company, in 1849 (Archeological Survey, 1989). Until the 1930s, there were still houses located along Second Avenue where the PTC is now located. The last company to have operations on the site was the Pittsburgh Works of the Jones and Laughlin Steel Corporation in 1979. This area was purchased by the Park Corporation in 1981, when J&L stopped their operations on the site. The Urban Redevelopment Authority of Pittsburgh (URA) then purchased the land from Park Corporation in 1983. The following is a list of other companies who have occupied the site in whole or in part before the Park Corporation purchased it. Many of these findings can be documented using Sanborn maps, which were maps created by the Sanborn Fire Insurance Company in order to record the facilities which they insured. Figures 1 through 5 are Sanborn maps of the facilities operated by these companies in the past on the PTC site.

Carnegie Mellon University won a highly competitive federal grant with RIDC assistance in November 1984 to build a Software Engineering Institute which kick started Pittsburgh's development as a technology hub, leading eventually to the investment in and creation of PTC.

Adjacent to PTC is the 178-acre redevelopment site – Hazelwood Green – the remainder of the former J&L / LTV steel mill site. Having begun 30 years after PTC, redevelopment of Hazelwood Green is still in its early stages; the first building on-site was occupied in Summer 2019.

== Conditions and infrastructure at the time of redevelopment ==
A concrete structural slab, which was once the foundation of the hot strip mill, exists below the ground surface of the PTC site. The slab has an average thickness of 11 inches, but it ranges from 6 to 34.75 inches. The slab was not demolished once construction began on the PTC. There were also structure and machine foundations that include pit, tunnel, and basement walls located below the surface. Before construction began on the PTC, the pits and tunnels were re-excavated to provide better support for the new structures being built (Archeological Survey, 1989).

Before construction began on the PTC, the site was cleared of all existing buildings except one, the former Soho Works galvanizing line and attached warehouse. This building was eventually occupied by Metaltech, Inc, which was itself acquired by Steel Dynamics in 2007.
