= Biagini Passo =

Compact convertible Italian crossover vehicle

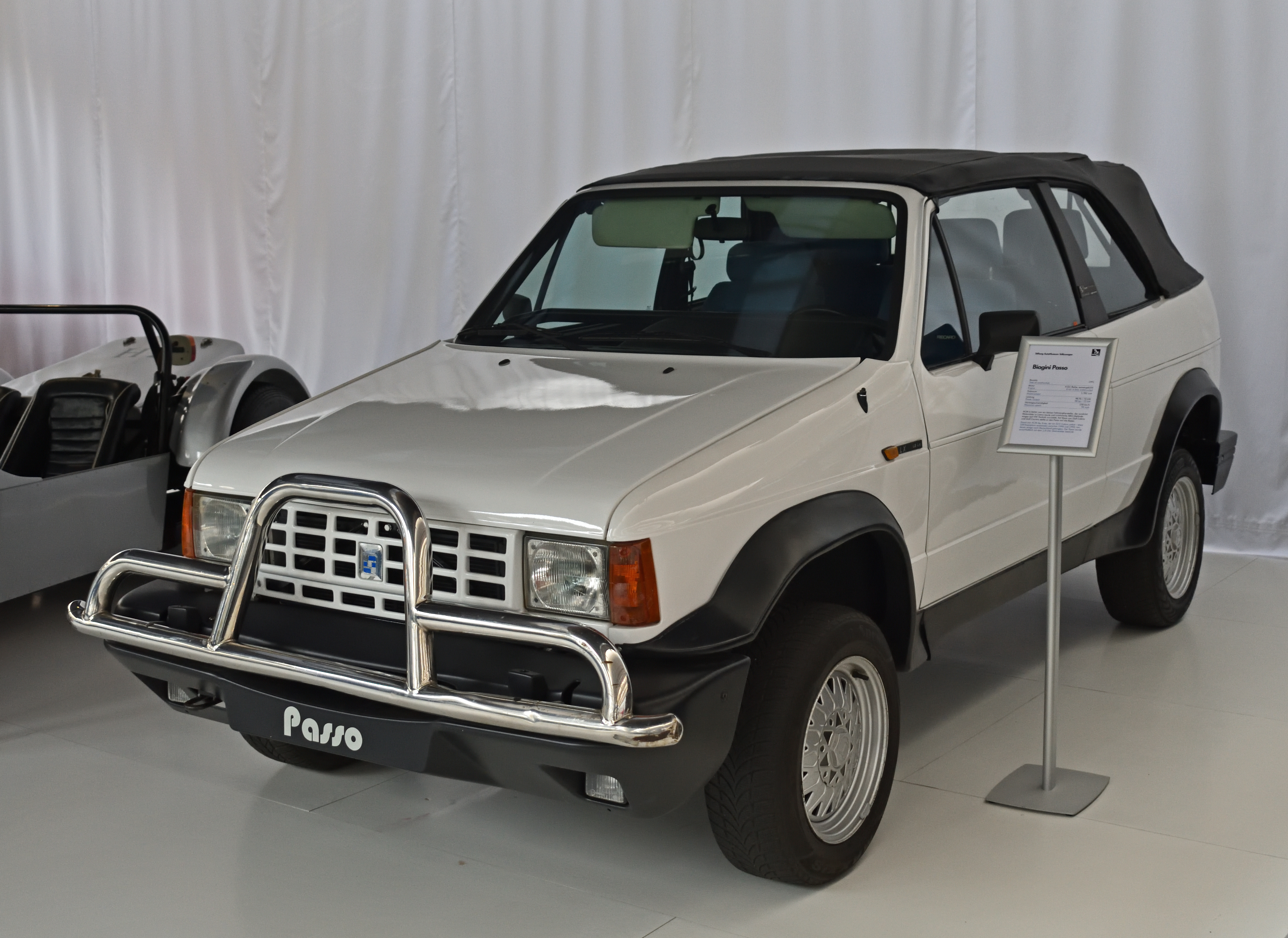

Overview
- Manufacturer: Automobili Biagini
- Production: 1990–1993
- Assembly: Italy: Atessa, Chieti

Body and chassis
- Class: Crossover
- Body style: Convertible
- Layout: Front-engine, all-wheel-drive
- Platform: Volkswagen Group A1 platform
- Related: Mk1 Golf Cabriolet; Mk2 Golf Country

Powertrain
- Engine: 1.8 L (109.8 cu in) I4
- Transmission: 5-speed manual

Dimensions
- Wheelbase: 2,480 mm (97.6 in)
- Length: 4,255 mm (167.5 in)
- Width: 1,705 mm (67.1 in)
- Height: 1,555 mm (61.2 in)
- Curb weight: 1,245 kg (2,745 lb)

The Biagini Passo is a compact convertible all-wheel drive crossover built in Italy from 1990 to 1993. It made extensive use of Volkswagen components. Reminiscent of some earlier beach cars and buggys, it has been called the first ever convertible crossover.

== Background ==
The corporate background of the Biagini Passo has been described as "complex". Period advertising calls the Passo a product of Automobili Biagini, a division of ACM SpA. ACM had previously operated under the name Ali Ciemme SpA, part of that name being an initialism for even earlier company names; "Carrozzeria Mediterranea", and, later, "Centro Multiindustriale".

ACM was best known for assembling a version of the Romanian ARO 10 for sale in Italy. Early copies used the original ARO body style. Models with Renault gasoline engines were called the Aro Ischia, and those with Volkswagen diesel engines were the Aro Super Ischia. A later model with revised bodywork was called the ACM Enduro x4.

A key person behind both ACM and the development of the Biagini Passo was Livio Biagini. Early in his career, Livio worked for his uncle Bruno Cavani, who produced motorcycles under his own name using engines from DKW and frames and other parts sourced locally. In 1957 Cavani transferred control of DKW-Cavani to his nephew Livio, who shortly thereafter closed it down and established a new company called Motauto.

Livio was later one of the principals of IAP-Honda, an Italian company established to assemble Honda motorcycles for sale in Europe from imported and locally-produced parts. He was subsequently investigated for fraud in relation to this company's dealings. During the investigation Livio apparently fled the country, possibly to Venezuela, and was considered a fugitive. Livio's name was also found on a list of purported members of the illegal Propaganda Due organization.

Livio returned to Italy and became the local importer of Chrysler products for the country. His dealings with the Romanian ARO came after this.

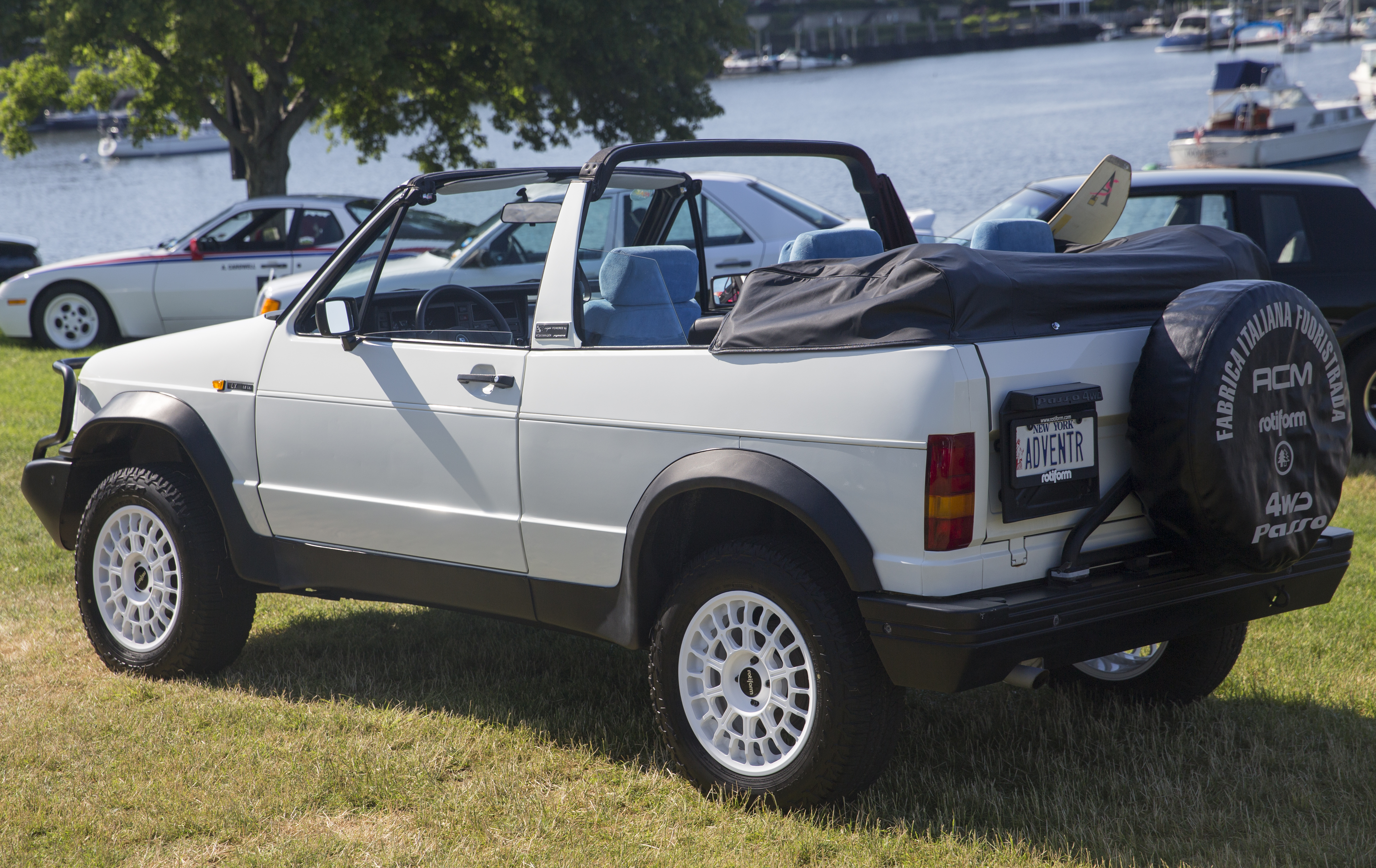
Rear side view of 1992 Biagini Passo LX

The Biagini Passo was built in ACM's factory in Atessa, in the province of Chieti. 220 people worked at this location building the car.

Production estimates range from a high of around 300 units, to a low of less than 100, and possibly as few as 65. The Passo was sold in both Italy and Germany.

While most production Passos used a 1.8 L gasoline engine, a 2.0 L version was available in some markets, including Italy. The company planned to eventually offer three different gasoline engine options and one diesel, while also reportedly working on a hardtop version of the Passo.

Inadequate corrosion protection has resulted in many Passos being scrapped due to rust damage, making roadworthy examples even rarer.

Volkswagen called the Biagini Passo a "conceptual predecessor" of their own T-Roc Cabriolet of 2020. A Biagini Passo was displayed at the Volkswagen AutoMuseum in February 2019.

== Features ==
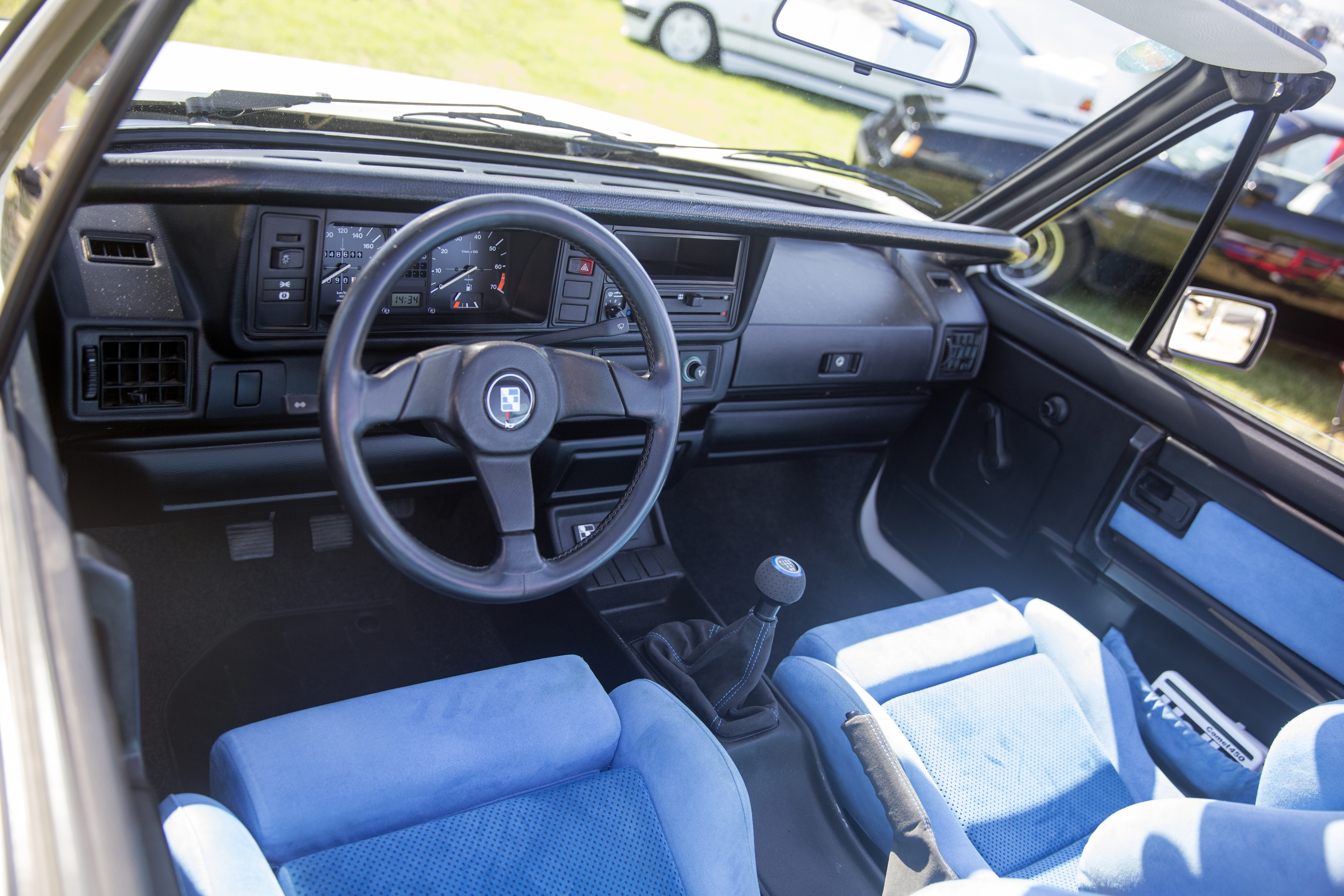
Biagini Passo interior

The Biagini Passo is based on the body and unibody chassis of the Volkswagen Golf Mk1 Cabriolet. Biagini added a custom subframe that allowed it to accept the Syncro all-wheel drive powertrain from the MkII Golf Country. Ground clearance was raised to 10.2 in (259 mm).

The Golf Country powertrain provided the Passo's 1.8 L Volkswagen EA827 single overhead camshaft (SOHC) inline four cylinder gasoline engine and five-speed manual transmission. It also provided the part-time all-wheel drive system developed by Steyr-Daimler-Puch with viscous coupler that engages the rear wheels when the fronts began to slip.

The Passo's headlamps and front indicators are from the 1980–1985 Fiat Panda, side indicators from the 1983 Fiat Ritmo, and taillamps from the 1983 Opel Kadett D sedan and first generation Vauxhall Astra.

The Golf's original top-hinged rear liftgate is replaced with a wider bottom-hinged dropgate. The folding roof framework is a modified Golf Mk1 Cabriolet assembly used with the original soft top. The Golf's original glass rear window panel is replaced with a transparent Perspex panel that can be zipped out, a change necessitated by the revised tailgate.

The front fenders and the hood are custom pieces produced by Biagini. A bullbar was added in front, plastic fender flares on the sides, and at the rear an externally mounted spare wheel and tire.

On the interior, the fascia is from the Golf Mk1 but is fitted with an additional full-width handle that extends across to the passenger side. The steering wheel is from Nardi, and the front seats from Recaro. The interior is trimmed in a combination of cloth and leather or Alcantara.

== Models ==
- Passo 1.8i L, 88 hp (66 kW) (December 1990 – November 1991)
- Passo 1.8i LX (December 1990 – November 1991)
- Passo 1.8i L Plus (November 1991 – December 1993)
- Passo 1.8i LX, with catalytic converter (November 1991 – December 1993)

== Specifications ==
Biagini Passo	Detail
Engine type:	Volkswagen EA827 straight-four engine
Bore × Stroke:	81.0 mm × 86.4 mm (3.2 in × 3.4 in)
Displacement:	1,781 cc (108.7 cu in)
Compression ratio:	9.0:1
Induction:	Naturally aspirated, multi-point injection
Maximum power:	72 kW (97 hp) at 5400 rpm
Maximum torque:	143 N⋅m (105 lb⋅ft) at 3000 rpm
Emission control:	Catalytic converter
Transmission:	5-speed manual transmission
Drive:	Part-time all-wheel drive with viscous coupling unit
Length: Width: Height:	4,255 mm (167.5 in); 1,705 mm (67.1 in); 1,555 mm (61.2 in)
Wheelbase:	2,480 mm (97.6 in)
Track f/r:	1,435 / 1,443 mm (56.5 / 56.8 in)
Turning circle:	10.5 m (34.4 ft)
Wheels:	6Jx15
Tires:	195/60R15
Curb weight:	1,245 kg (2,745 lb)
Maximum total weight:	1,640 kg (3,616 lb)
Top speed:	155 km/h (96 mph)
0–80 km/h (0–50 mph) time:	8.2 s
0–100 km/h (0–62 mph) time:	12.3 s
Fuel:	Regular unleaded gasoline
Consumption at 90 km/h (56 mph):	8.5 L/100 km (33.2 mpg_{‑imp}; 27.7 mpg_{‑US})
Consumption at 120 km/h (75 mph):	11.4 L/100 km (24.8 mpg_{‑imp}; 20.6 mpg_{‑US})
Consumption (city):	11.9 L/100 km (23.7 mpg_{‑imp}; 19.8 mpg_{‑US})
