= RIDC =

American non-profit organization

RIDC (Regional Industrial Development Corporation)
- Founded: 1955 (71 years ago)
- Location: 267 Kappa Drive, Pittsburgh, PA 15238
- Region served: Pittsburgh metropolitan area
- Key people: Donald F. Smith, Jr. PhD, President Timothy White, Senior VP, Business Development and Strategy Mike Goldstrom, Senior Vice President, Real Estate
- Employees: 31
- Website: ridc.org

The Regional Industrial Development Corporation of Southwestern Pennsylvania—known colloquially as RIDC—is a privately funded non-profit serving the Pittsburgh metropolitan area to focus on a regional approach to economic development primarily through managing and rehabilitating area research and industrial parks, often old abandoned or obsolute facilities formerly used as steel mills or other heavy industry, for modern tenants. RIDC was formed on August 8, 1955, as a non-profit corporation after area business, corporate, government and labor leaders supported a central agency responsible for developing and coordinating efforts to create new employment and economic diversity. As of March 2024 it is listed as the fourth largest commercial property manager in metropolitan Pittsburgh with 7,700,000 gross leasable square feet, behind only Oxford Development and CBRE Group while surpassing Jones Lang LaSalle.

== Research parks ==
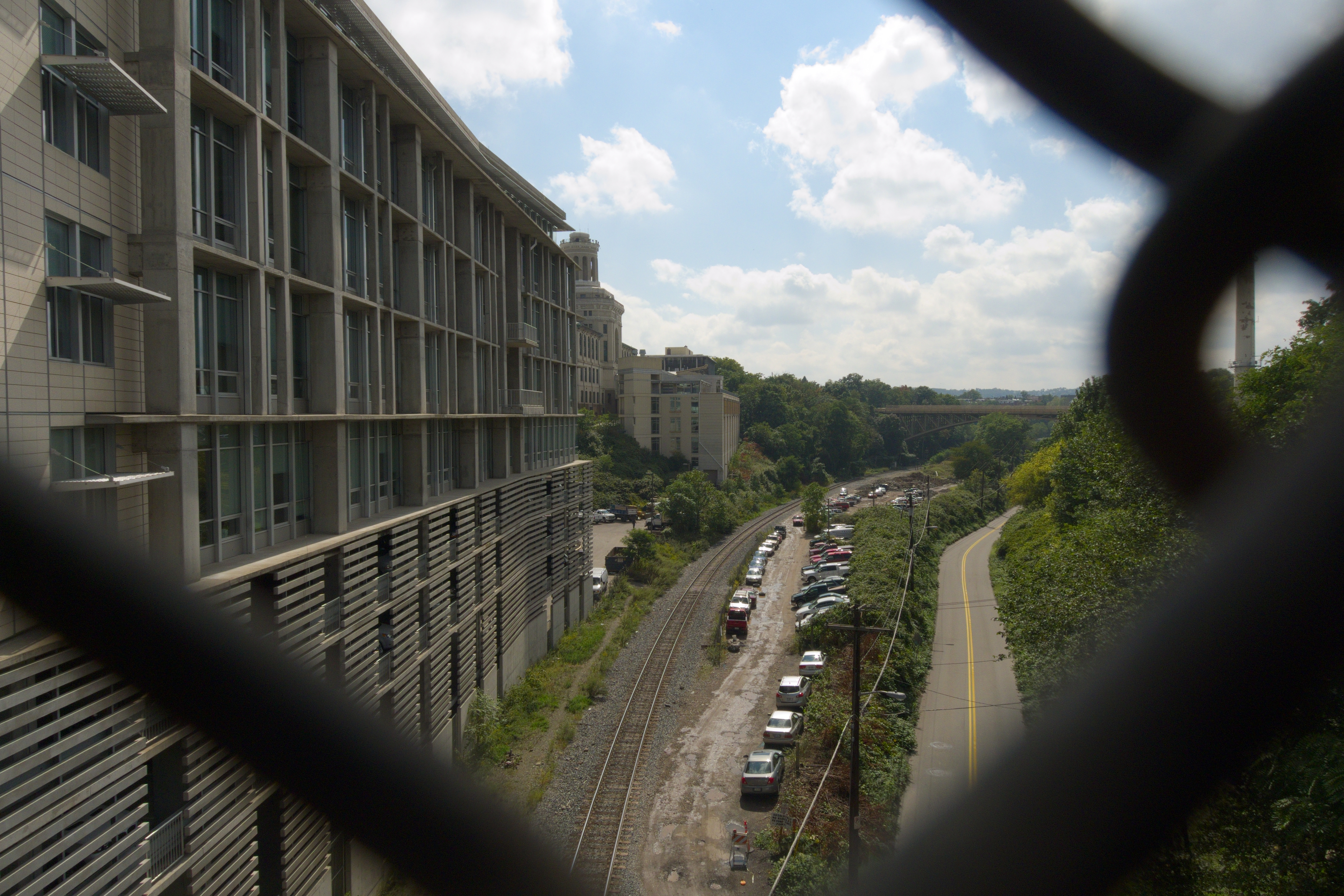
The Collaborative Innovation Center (left), Carnegie Mellon University's Hamerschlag Hall (center), and railroad tracks in Pittsburgh

RIDC provides development, finance and leasing of new and redeveloped research and business parks using a wide range of real estate development activities. RIDC Research and Business parks are both new development and lab or industrial transfers from such corporations as Sony, Westinghouse and US Steel and include:

- Bakery Square (2007 site preparation)
- Beaver Manor (since 1987)
- Carrie Furnace
- City Center of Duquesne
- Collaborative Innovation Center
- Glassport (historical involvement circa 1978)
- Industrial Center of McKeesport (since 1984)
- Innovation Ridge
- Keystone Commons (since 1893, RIDC since 1987)
- Lawrenceville Technology Center
- Mill 19 at Hazelwood Green (home to Carnegie Mellon University's Manufacturing Futures Institute and Advanced Robotics for Manufacturing, Motional, and others)
- Neighborhood 91 (advanced manufacturing campus, as master developer)
- Neshannock
- New Kensington Advanced Manufacturing Park (partnership with Westmoreland Industrial Corp)
- Park Lane (1988 site preparation)
- Park West (original home to USAirways Ops Center)
- Pittsburgh Technology Center (48 acres since 1984)
- RIDC Armstrong Innovation Park
- RIDC O'Hara Industrial Park (Giant Eagle headquarters)
- RIDC Westmoreland Innovation Center
- Southpointe (historical involvement, 589 acres)
- Tech 21
- Thorn Hill (900 acres started December 11, 1968)

== Mission ==
RIDC's mission is to foster and support economic growth with job creation through public policy advocacy, economic development initiatives, and real estate development to advance the public interest within the greater Pittsburgh region. Relying on public, private, and institutional partnerships, RIDC has assisted both emerging and existing growth opportunities across industry sectors.

== Community support ==
With a long history of regional economic development initiatives RIDC staff includes professionals in economic development, public policy, finance and property management, planning, engineering, construction, site selection, facility design, construction management with regular interaction with community leaders, corporate CEOs and Chairman. RIDC has provided comprehensive and coordinated development or redevelopment of property projects from conceptual design to completion and occupancy as well as business incubators. Varied industry needs, including machinery and equipment financing assistance are serviced by the RIDC for new, small and growing business enterprises, applied research and development activities and partnership with Western Pennsylvania's academic institutions. Historically the RIDC has hosted Pittsburgh Hilton conferences with area business leaders, Chambers of Commerce and speeches from the Governor of Pennsylvania and head of the Department of Community and Economic Development, as well as County and municipal officials around the region. It has partnered with the Appalachian Regional Commission, Carnegie Mellon University the Heinz Endowments and the Richard King Mellon Foundation among others. It has provided board members for the Allegheny County Planning Commission for such projects as Oxford Centre.

== History ==
In early 1955 Pittsburgh business, corporate, government and labor leaders supported a central agency responsible for developing and coordinating efforts to create new employment and economic diversity. The RIDC was established August 8, 1955 as a nonprofit corporation and amended its charter on February 16, 1962 to allow it to engage directly in such things as construction, purchasing, selling and financing of developments.

Operational goals of the RIDC are to maintain a dynamic economic development portfolio through preserving, strengthening and expanding the area's employment base through retention and expansion of job opportunities, and by developing and promoting programs that assist in the creation of a more diversified economy.

== Presidents ==
- John P. Robin 1955–1967
- Hiram Milton 1967–1981
- Frank Brooks Robinson 1981–2003
- Robert C. Stephenson 2003–2009
- Dr. Donald F. Smith Jr. 2009–Present

Managing Initiatives RIDC also manages several programs, including the Strategic Investment Fund, Keystone Innovation Zone, Foreign Trade Zone, and PIDA loan applications.
