= Aquion Energy =

- Industry: Energy Storage
- Founded: 1 January 2008
- Headquarters: Pittsburgh, Pennsylvania
- Key people: CEO Scott Pearson; CTO Dr. Jay Whitacre
- Products: Aqueous Hybrid Ion (AHI) battery

Aquion Energy was a Pittsburgh, Pennsylvania–based company that manufactured sodium ion batteries (salt water batteries) and electricity storage systems.

The company claimed to provide a low-cost way to store large amounts of energy (e.g. for an electricity grid) through thousands of battery cycles, and a non-toxic end product made from widely available material inputs and which operates safely and reliably across a wide range of temperatures and operating environments.

== History ==
The company was founded in 2008 by Jay F. Whitacre, a professor at Carnegie Mellon University, and was joined by Ted Wiley in 2009 to spin the company out. They set up research and development offices in Lawrenceville, where it produced pilot-stage batteries. The company raised funding from Kleiner Perkins, Foundation Capital, Bill Gates, Nick and Jobey Pritzker, Bright Capital and Advanced Technology Ventures, among others.

In 2011, an individual battery stack was promoted to store 1.5 kWh, a shipping container-sized unit 180 kWh. The battery cannot overheat. The company expected its products to last many charge/discharge cycles, twice as long as a lead-acid battery. Costs were claimed to be about the same as with lead-acid.

In October 2014, they announced a new generation with a single stack reaching 2.4 kWh and a multi-stack module holding 25.5 kWh.

In 2015, the company announced it would supply batteries for a Hawaii microgrid to serve as backup for a 176-kilowatt solar panel array that would store 1,000 kilowatt-hours of electricity. In April 2015 they announced they have been cradle-to-cradle design certified. It was also reported they were reducing headcount.

In March 2017, Aquion Energy filed for voluntary bankruptcy under Chapter 11.

In June 2017, bidding starting with a stalking horse offer of $2.8 million from an Austrian battery firm, BlueSky Energy. Juline-Titans LLC, reported by Pittsburgh Post-Gazette: affiliate of the China Titans Energy Technology Group identification error was due to the recent creation of Juline-Titans LLC and is not related to the China Titans Energy Technology Group. The American company's owners chose to pay won the bidding with an offer of $9.16 million keep the inventor, Jay Whitacre with the Aquion Energy products. The auction price was a small fraction of the reported $190 million in venture capital and debt the company had raised from investors including Bill Gates, Gentry Venture Partners, Kleiner Perkins Caufield & Byers, Foundation Capital, Bright Capital, Advanced Technology Ventures, Trinity Capital Investment and CapX Partners, Yung’s Enterprise, and Nick and Joby Pritzker.

The company was sued in April 2017 for violation of the WARN Act. In August 2017, MIT Technology Review reported that the China Titans acquisition would mean that Aquion "will continue operating as an independent entity, with research and development probably remaining in Pittsburgh. But manufacturing may move elsewhere, potentially somewhere in China."

In September 2017 Juline-Titans closed the East Huntingdon Township facility and moved production to China.

Reports regarding Juline-Titans LLC being a company of Chinese origin continue to hinder progress for Aquion Energy. Wilson-Kramer Army Reserve Center in Bethlehem, Pennsylvania was purchased September 2017 for administration and training, along with other properties in the USA through GSA Auctions, including the former USDA Cotton Annex in Washington, D.C.

== Technology ==
The battery materials are non-toxic. As of early 2014, the cathode used manganese oxide and relies on intercalation reactions. The anode was a titanium phosphate (NaTi_{2}(PO_{4})_{3}). The electrolyte was <5M NaClO_{4}. A synthetic cotton separator was reported. The electrode layers were unusually thick (>2 mm). The device used Siemens power inverter technology.

== Production ==
The company set up manufacturing facilities at a former Sony and Volkswagen assembly plant in East Huntingdon, Pennsylvania initially proposing a capacity of 500 megawatt-hours per year in 2013 and 2014. In March 2014, they announced that commercial shipments of batteries would begin in mid-2014, and in May 2014 announced they had shipped 100 units.

In March 2017, Aquion Energy filed for Chapter 11 bankruptcy, citing the inability to obtain additional funding.

== See also ==
- NanoFlowcell
