= James Fuller (automobile executive) =

American businessman (1938–1988)

James Ralph Fueller
- Born: September 17, 1938; Boston, Massachusetts, U.S.
- Died: December 21, 1988 (aged 50) over Lockerbie, Scotland, U.K.
- Education: Northeastern University; Fairleigh Dickinson University
- Occupation: Automobile executive
- Employer: Volkswagen America (1981–1988)
- Title: President of Volkswagen America (1982–1988)

James Ralph Fuller (September 17, 1938 – December 21, 1988) was an American automobile executive who worked for various foreign and domestic car companies before joining Volkswagen.

Fuller was born in Boston, and grew to love cars as a boy, regularly reading Sportscar Graphic magazine in his teens. In 1962, while still in college at Northeastern University, Fuller participated in a cooperative education program at Ford Motor Company. After graduating with honors he went to work at Ford, where he conducted the launches of the Torino, Mustang II, and Granada models made by Ford's namesake brand. He later worked at Renault and American Motors.

Fuller ultimately joined Volkswagen of America, where he directed the Porsche-Audi division and was able to increase sales 17 percent by 1981.

He was appointed to run the VW brand in May 1982 to duplicate his success at Porsche-Audi. Fuller was credited with helping to restore Volkswagen's image as an inexpensive European car with the performance and handling typical of German car makes. At the time Fuller became the leader of the Volkswagen sales division, the Volkswagen Rabbit had been manufactured at the company's Westmoreland Assembly Plant for four years, and revisions to make it drive and handle more like an American car had compromised VW's reputation.

Soon after taking over VW, Fuller succeeded in having the GTI version of the Rabbit (Golf in Europe) manufactured at the Pennsylvania plant, after the Golf GTI had been on sale in Europe for six years. Automobile magazines and Volkswagen enthusiasts in the United States welcomed the GTI to the Rabbit lineup, and Volkswagen quickly followed with a high-performance version of the Jetta notchback, the GLI. Fuller explained that he wanted Volkswagen to go farther with performance by offering good passing speed and safety-related factors like braking.

The Volkswagen brand's German-ness was also emphasized by Fuller in VW marketing. When Dr. Carl Hahn insisted that the second-generation Golf bear that name in the United States and Canada instead of the Rabbit name, Fuller strongly agreed. He believed that "Golf" (short for Golf-Strom, German for "Gulf Stream") was a more appropriate name for a German brand, even in North America. By 1987, Volkswagen was using as its U.S. slogan the term "German engineering. The Volkswagen way."

Fuller could not reverse VW's slide in the U.S., despite a brief sales surge in 1985 and 1986, but he was able to keep many dealers from deserting VW at a critical time for the company's American operations. In July 1988, however, the Pennsylvania plant—a factory Fuller himself believed was a questionable idea—closed due to declining Golf sales. He had been instrumental in orchestrating the arrival of the Passat and Corrado in 1990, keeping them mostly in-line with their German roots, and he had also been a major part of the (ultimately unsuccessful) effort to bring the Rallye Golf, a four-wheel-drive, supercharged motorsport model of the Golf, to the U.S.

In December 1988, Fuller and VW marketing director Lou Marengo were flying home from a meeting with Volkswagen executives in Germany when they were killed in the Pan Am Flight 103 bombing. Abdelbaset al-Megrahi was convicted in 2001 of 270 counts of murder in connection with the bombing and was sentenced to life imprisonment.

The deaths of Fuller and Marengo were a major blow to Volkswagen of America, but Fuller had given the company a sense of focus that would allow it to recover in the 1990s.

== Sources ==
- Ceppos, Rich, Car and Driver , November 1982.
- Kiley, David, "Getting The Bugs Out: The Rise, Fall and Comeback of Volkswagen in America", Adweek, 2002.
