= Volkswagen Westmoreland Assembly =

Former automobile plant in Pennsylvania, U.S.

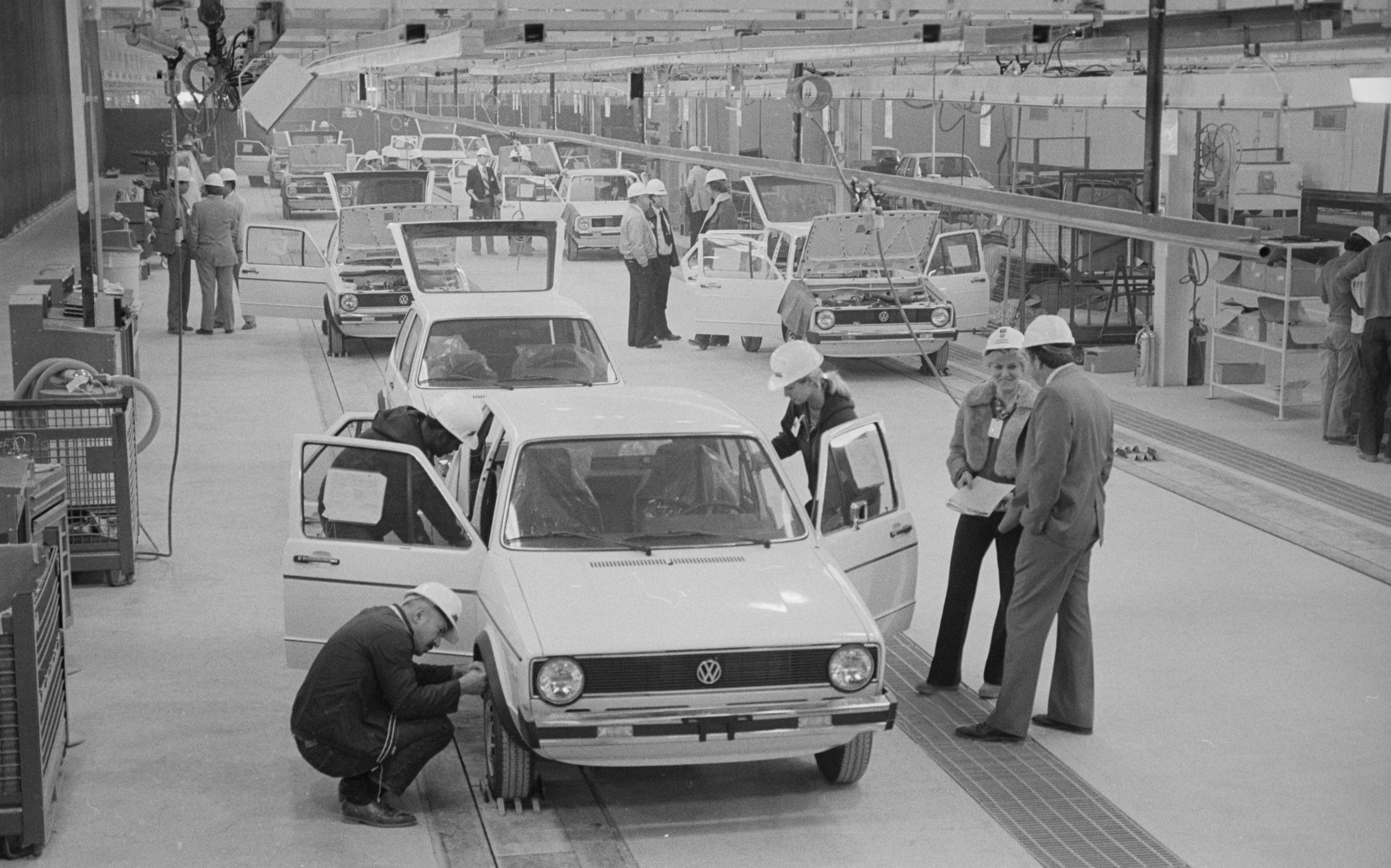
- Westemoreland assembly workers being trained in 1977
- Operated: 1978–1988
- Location: Westmoreland County, Pennsylvania
- Coordinates: 40.1864°N 79.5783°W
- Industry: Automotive
- Products: Automobiles
- Owner: Volkswagen USA

Volkswagen Westmoreland Assembly was a manufacturing complex located 35 miles (56 km) southeast of Pittsburgh in Westmoreland County, Pennsylvania, near New Stanton—and noted for manufacturing 1.15 million Volkswagens from 1978 until 1988. When VWoA began manufacturing in the unfinished Chrysler plant, it became the first foreign automobile company to build cars in the US since Rolls-Royce manufactured cars in Springfield, Massachusetts, from 1921 to 1931.

Chrysler had called the facility the New Stanton plant; Volkswagen changed the name to Westmoreland.

The factory manufactured a range of fuel-efficient small cars with gasoline and diesel engines, all variants (or rebadged models) of Volkswagen's Golf: the Rabbit (79–84); Rabbit GTI (83–84); Rabbit Pickup (1979–1982); the Golf Mk2 and GTI (85–89) and the Jetta (87–89). Built with the largest incentive package the Commonwealth of Pennsylvania had ever offered, the factory had an estimated annual capacity of 240,000 cars, and reached production of 200,000 in 1980. Engines and drivetrains for Westmoreland production were sourced from West Germany. Employment, projected at 20,000, reached its highest level in mid-1981 at 6,000 and by 1984 had dropped to 1,500.

Initially the plant was successful, but numerous factors contributed to a sharp decline in sales of the cars manufactured at Westmoreland and the factory's ultimate demise. These included increased competition in the North American small car market, easing of the period's fuel crisis, poorly received changes to the character of the cars, VWoA's long product life-cycle, the internal economics of the plant, persistent labor unrest and poor networking between Westmoreland and Volkswagen headquarters in Germany. The factory operated at less than half its design capacity and VWoA suffered operating losses during the last five years of its operation. Sales of Volkswagen's US-built cars plummeted by nearly 60% between 1980 and 1985.

Japanese manufacturers soon followed VWoA's presence in the US, achieving success but having non-unionized plants including Honda at their Marysville, Ohio, plant and Toyota at their Georgetown, Kentucky, plant.

By the early 1980s, Volkswagen began retreating from manufacturing in North America, selling another assembly plant it had begun developing and two ancillary plants to Westmoreland in West Virginia and Texas. With the plant operating at 40% capacity and annual losses of $120 million, Volkswagen closed Westmoreland Assembly on July 14, 1988.

Volkswagen later expanded production of cars in Puebla, Mexico, and in 2011 inaugurated its Chattanooga Assembly Plant.

The Westmoreland plant was subsequently used by Sony for producing televisions from 1990 to 2009, as the Sony Technology Center-Pittsburgh (STC-P). As of 2014, the site is marketed as RIDC Westmoreland and is owned by RIDC, the Regional Industrial Development Corporation of Southwestern Pennsylvania.

== Beginnings ==
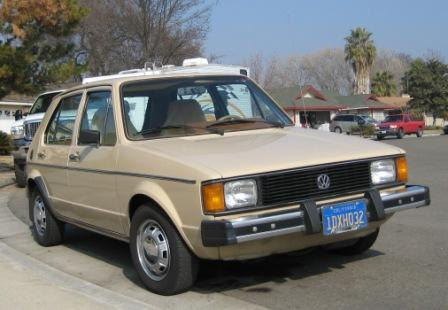
Volkswagen Rabbit manufactured at Westmoreland Assembly

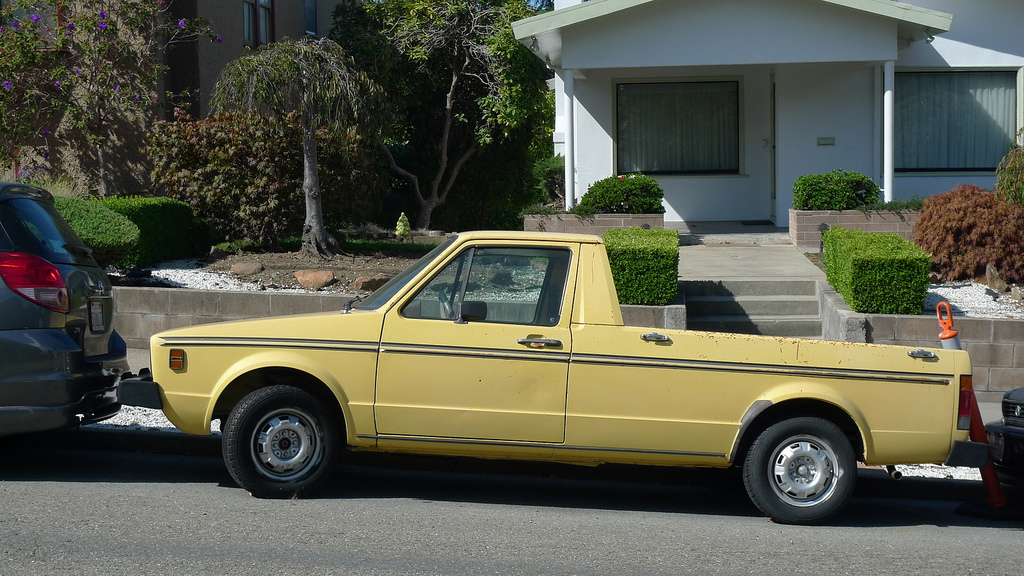
Volkswagen Rabbit Pickup manufactured at Westmoreland Assembly

Prior to development of Westmoreland Assembly, Volkswagen of America was headed by James W. (Jim) McLernon, a former Chevrolet manufacturing chief. Toni Schmücker, VW management board Chairman, selected McLernon to investigate feasibility of US production, in part to help the company avoid international currency fluctuations and high German wages.

After investigating five sites and narrowing the field to two alternate sites, a former Westinghouse appliance factory in Columbus, Ohio, and a federal tank plant in the Cleveland suburb of Brook Park, VWoA signed a 30-year lease on Chrysler's unfinished New Stanton plant originally constructed in 1969 on 1,200 acres (5 km^{2}) at Route 119 in East Huntingdon Township – just outside New Stanton, Pennsylvania.

At Westmoreland, Volkswagen developed three major buildings, two minor buildings, and a waste water treatment system. Richard S. Cummins, the plant manager, described the inside of the largest unfinished building with 2.1 million square feet, as a "three-dimensional chess-board covering an area of over 37 football fields." Land was graded for a new railway spur, and underground holding tanks constructed for the various fluids to be pumped into the building. The complex included several two-story buildings: an administration building, a building with worker facilities and a metallurgy, plastic, rubber, and electrical testing lab, a building with a paint lab as well as durability and emissions testing and a rail yard.

VWoA purchased the site with a $40 million loan from the state of Pennsylvania and then invested about $250 million to ready the factory for assembly. In the richest corporate deal to date in Pennsylvania history, state and local officials offered VWoA an incentive package worth nearly $100 million in government assistance, highway and rail improvements and a property-tax exemption.

VW subsequently purchased an American Motors stamping plant in South Charleston, West Virginia, investing further to make the factory capable of producing exterior sheet metal stampings for Westmoreland and then purchased a small plant in Fort Worth, Texas for manufacture of the air-conditioning and heating systems and plastic-trim to facilitate integration of factory installed air-conditioning in the Westmoreland-manufactured cars. VWoA later purchased a former Chrysler missile plant in Sterling Heights, Michigan, to begin developing its second North American assembly plant.

On April 10, 1978, VWoA dedicated Westmoreland Assembly by driving its first car off the line, a two-door white Rabbit (in Rabbit C or mid trim level, as with all the initial production) — which had actually been assembled the week before and was shipped after the plant dedication to Volkswagen's Wolfsburg headquarters for its museum. Toni Schmücker, Richard E Dauch, James McLernon, U.S. Treasury Secretary Michael Blumenthal, Pennsylvania Governor Milton Shapp and 1,200 employees were on hand the day the first car came off of the line. In his remarks, Schmücker, CEO of Volkswagen AG, paraphrased Neil Armstrong remarks when stepping onto the moon, saying "this may be one small step for America, but it is a giant step for Volkswagen."

According to Richard Dauch, who was general manufacturing manager for Volkswagen Manufacturing of America from 1976 to 1978, "within 18 months, from 1976 until April 10, 1978, we had production, excellent quality with no product recalls, over 1,000 (completed cars) a day within two months of launch, two-door, four-door, diesel, K-Jetronic (fuel injection), 10 different body colors, four different interiors. And in that period, every single goal set by the board of directors was met or exceeded, we launched on time and early. We were staying within budgets. We were actually making profits." As of 1979, Volkswagen was "extremely pleased with the quality and productivity" of Westmoreland Assembly.

== Problems ==
Prior to manufacturing the first car, VWoA conceded that Westmoreland "was a gamble in 'a problem market' marked by sluggish sales and intense competition from other small car makers." Changes to the cars' Germanic character were not well-received. Problems surfaced with the plant's economics as well as vehicle quality. Also, Westmoreland was beset with unionized labor problems.

=== Americanization ===
Neither buyers nor company executives in Germany were pleased with the Americanization of the Rabbit using a softer suspension, less expensive interior materials and decidedly un-Germanic color-keyed interiors. Popular Mechanics said "inside is where you really see the Americanization of the Rabbit, the interior is comfortable but puffy. In fact, it's downright tacky" – adding that the side marker lights on the Rabbit looked as if they "came off a kids bike." USA Today, in 2010 described the Americanization of the Rabbit from Westmoreland: "Malibu-ing the Rabbit was the dismissive comment at the time, a reference to a soft-riding Chevy model unloved by fans of German makes." Management at Volkswagen of America was also described as having become Americanized and having struggled with advertising for Westmoreland's main product, the Rabbit. In his 2002 book Getting the Bugs Out: the Rise, Fall, and Comeback of Volkswagen in America, David Kiley said that "the German character was fading into oblivion."

By 1983 Westmoreland went back to using stiffer shocks and suspension with higher-quality interior trim. Volkswagen claimed to have made 1,300 changes to the Rabbit for the 1983 model year, with all Rabbit models getting a retuned suspension with stiffer spring rates and revised shock valving. This, along with the North American introduction of the GTI, was part of efforts by new Volkswagen CEO (and former Volkswagen of America president) Carl Hahn and American Volkswagen brand leader Jim Fuller to de-Americanize the VW brand in the US.

=== Plant economics ===
In some respects, the Westmoreland plant was "virtually outdated by the day it opened." A similar plant opened at the same time by Chrysler had far more automation and could produce half again as many cars as Westmoreland. VWoA's plant had to run at 85% of capacity to break even, rather than the projected 50% — which proved detrimental when Rabbit sales fell and VWoA had to begin offering rebates on a stock of unsold cars. The West Virginia stamping plant arrangement proved problematic. The plant was not automated, was four hours from Westmoreland, and body panels had to be shipped between the two sites. At times, crucial parts were rushed to Westmoreland by helicopter or Lear jet to avoid a shutdown.

=== Quality ===
Consumers Union ranked the VWoA Westmoreland vehicles in 1977-79 had "worse than average maintenance record, including an oil burning problem." An analyst with Drexel Burnham Lambert said in 1987 "the quality of the cars built in Pennsylvania wasn't up to the quality of the cars in Germany." An analyst for Global Insight, John Wolkonowicz, said the Rabbit was "probably the most troublesome Volkswagen ever built."

=== Labor unrest ===
For the assembly line, Volkswagen did not develop its own skill base for Westmoreland, instead bringing in workers from Detroit. 100 workers were brought in from Great Britain. A field of 40,000 applied for jobs at Westmoreland. No more than 20% of the workers had ever worked for an automobile manufacturer, and the average age of workers was 24-26; at the time this was considered a demographic that was "independent and militant." VWoA chose employees not by skills, but by how long they had been unemployed.

The plant was organized by the United Auto Workers; a 1992 New York Times article described it as the only "transplant" factory (a factory of a foreign automotive company in the US) that the UAW had succeeded in representing, and that the plant "began with a strike and lurched from problem to problem before closing"

From the outset, minorities picketed the site, seeking fair treatment in the hiring process and by its first 20 months of operation, workers had staged six walkouts.

On October 13, 1978, six months after the plant opened, UAW workers staged a wildcat strike at Westmoreland for salaries equal to those received by General Motors Corporation employees. Picketing workers chanted "No Money, No Bunny." In 1981, Westmoreland Assembly avoided a strike when it reached agreement with the UAW over essentially the same issue: the disparity between wages earned at Westmoreland, where assemblers made an average of $10.76 per hour, and those at domestic auto plants in Detroit, where GM and Ford assemblers made an average of $11.42 per hour.

Volkswagen settled a 1983 discrimination suit with the United Auto Workers to settle claims that they discriminated against black employees at Westmoreland Assembly. Plaintiffs had sought $70 million when filing suit, charging that management had initiated or tolerated "a pattern and practice" of limited hirings and promotions of blacks, that blacks were also subject to arbitrary firings and demotions and that the company openly allowed racial insults and threats in the workplace. Volkswagen of America Inc. denied the charges and later settled the case in 1989, paying 800 plaintiffs $670,000 and the United Auto Workers $48,000. The most prominent black executive at the Westmoreland factory and spokesman for the "VW Black Caucus" committed suicide, bringing further notoriety to the suit.

== Demise ==
Sales of the VWoA models built at Westmoreland dipped "as gas prices fell and consumer preference shifted to larger models," dropping by nearly 60% between 1980 and 1985. VW dealer defections became common. In 1983, Volkswagen and Chrysler entered discussions about joint-venturing at Westmoreland. The Detroit Free Press had earlier reported that Chrysler would take over VWoA's assembly operations.

VWoA built the last Rabbit model at Westmoreland on June 15, 1984, a white, two-door, fuel-injected, five-speed manual transmission Wolfsburg Edition Rabbit after spending about $200 million to retool the plant for the slightly larger and more powerful second generation Golf model. Tim Moran, writing for Automotive News in 2005, said the styling of the main product became too old, the fuel crisis had eased, Wolfsburg was too slow to adapt to changing conditions and costs became too high.

In September 1982, VWoA President Jim McLernon resigned amid widening losses. In 1983 VWoA sold its Sterling Heights, Michigan, plant back to Chrysler, the same former Chrysler missile plant it had previously purchased to develop as its second North American assembly plant. Subsequently, VWoA sold the former American Motors stamping plant in South Charleston, West Virginia, and its air-conditioning and plastic-trim plant in Texas to Valeo SA. Over the Thanksgiving weekend in 1987, Volkswagen announced it would close Westmoreland Assembly and on July 14, 1988, VWoA closed the plant.

Commenting on the US plant closings in a 1998 Volkswagen publication about the history of Volkswagen Mexico, Dr. Carl Hahn, who was chairman of Volkswagen AG at the time, said "The transfer of vehicle production to Mexico was done not only because of production losses in the U.S., but also with an eye to boosting sales in the US automotive market again through import to that country of low-cost vehicles made in Puebla... the decline of the US auto market had been foreseen for some time since the costs involved in US auto production were not competitive with European costs."

== After VWoA ==
After its closing, VWoA sold the welding line, tooling and other production equipment from Westmoreland Assembly to First Automotive Works of Changchun, China, producing the Volkswagen Jetta (A2) for over 30 years and contributing to the explosion of the Chinese auto market.

Machinery, tools and facilities including production facilities for the presses used in the South Charleston plant were transferred to Puebla. In 1988, Volkswagen spent $1 billion to expand operations in Puebla, Mexico, to build Golfs and Jettas.

Unverified reports suggest the stamping dies for the Rabbit and Rabbit Pickup may have been used to start Volkswagen Caddy and Citi Golf production in South Africa. VWoA sold the facility to the Commonwealth of Pennsylvania and the factory remained dormant for several years.

In 1990, Sony announced it would begin manufacturing televisions at the site. The facility employed more than 3,000 people in the late 1990s. That number had dwindled to just 250 in 2007. On December 9, 2008, Ed Rendell, Governor of Pennsylvania, announced that Sony planned to close the facility.

Automotive News reported in 2005, that the Corporation for Enterprise Development, a Washington economic think tank, estimated that "taxpayers were left with more than $70 million in incentives and loans used to lure (Westmoreland Assembly), whose promise never fully materialized."

As of 2010, the 2,000,000 square feet (190,000 m^{2}) plant remained idle, the largest block of commercial space available in Western Pennsylvania. As of 2014, the site is promoted as RIDC Westmoreland, and is owned by RIDC, the Regional Industrial Development Corporation of Southwestern Pennsylvania.

Twenty-three years after closing Westmoreland, in 2011 Volkswagen inaugurated its new Chattanooga Assembly Plant in a "right-to-work" state, one of 22 in the US that give workers the choice to join or not to join the dominant labor union on the premises — this with an estimated $577 million in incentives.

Aquion Energy opened a factory on the site in 2014 to produce large rechargeable batteries for renewable energy systems. The factory closed in 2017, and operations were moved to China.

== Overview timeline ==
- 1968: (September 26) Chrysler announces construction of the New Stanton plant.
- 1969: Chrysler suspends construction of the New Stanton plant while building's steel structure is being erected.
- 1976: (April 23) Volkswagen AG's supervisory board approves Rabbit production beginning in late 1977.
- 1976: (May) Volkswagen tentatively chooses Chrysler's abandoned New Stanton plant for its venture.
- 1976: (September) Volkswagen signs papers, committing to Chrysler's New Stanton plant.
- 1976: (October) Volkswagen signs 30-year lease on the New Stanton plant from Chrysler as an empty shell with a dirt floor, changing its name from the New Stanton plant to Westmoreland.
- 1978: VWoA purchases an American Motors stamping plant in South Charleston, West Virginia
- 1978: (April 3) VWoA completes first car off the assembly line.
- 1978: (April 10) VWoA dedicates Westmoreland, drives the "first car off the assembly line" is a white Rabbit.
- 1978: Minorities picket the site, seeking fair treatment in the hiring process.
- 1978: (October 13) UAW workers stage a wildcat strike at Westmoreland, for salaries equal to those received by General Motors Corporation employees. Picketing workers chant "No Money, No Bunny."
- 1980: (February) VW tentatively decides to build a second U.S. assembly plant in Sterling Heights, Michigan.
- 1981: (December) Sluggish sales force VWoA to cut production to 856 vehicles a day from an earlier peak of 1,100.
- 1981: (March 31) VWoA Westmoreland manufactures 500,000th car.
- 1982: (September) VWoA President James W. McLernon resigns amid widening losses.
- 1983: (January 7) William B. Brock, assistant administrator of personnel (the most prominent black executive at Westmoreland), commits suicide after a drawn-out controversy of alleged racial discrimination at the plant.
- 1983: VWoA sells its Sterling Heights, Michigan plant it had begun developing as its second North American assembly plant.
- 1983: VWoA ends discussions about joint-venturing with Chrysler at Westmoreland Assembly.
- 1985: (November 15) VWoA Westmoreland manufactures its millionth vehicle.
- 1985: Volkswagen sells former American Motors stamping plant in South Charleston, West Virginia
- 1987: (November, Thanksgiving weekend) Volkswagen announces it will close Westmoreland Assembly.
- 1988: (July 14) Volkswagen closes Westmoreland Assembly.
- 1988: VW sells its air-conditioning and plastic-trim plant in Texas to Valeo SA.
- Volkswagen sells Westmoreland to Commonwealth of Pennsylvania.
- 1988: Volkswagen spends $1 billion to expand operations in Puebla, Mexico, to build Golfs and Jettas.
- 1990: Sony announces plans to manufacture televisions at the plant.
- 2008: (December 9) Sony announces plans to close its Westmoreland manufacturing facility, the final television plant in the United States, laying off about 560 employees.
- 2009: (February) Television production ceased at Sony's Westmoreland plant.
- 2010: (March) The 2,000,000 square feet (190,000 m^{2}) building was closed by Sony.
- 2011: Volkswagen inaugurates its Chattanooga Assembly Plant in Tennessee, a "right-to-work" state, one of 22 in the United States that give workers the choice to join or not to join the dominant labor union on the premises.
- 2014: Aquion Energy begins manufacturing sodium ion batteries at the plant
- 2017: Aquion Energy ceases operations on the site.
