= Carl Hahn =

German businessman (1926–2023)

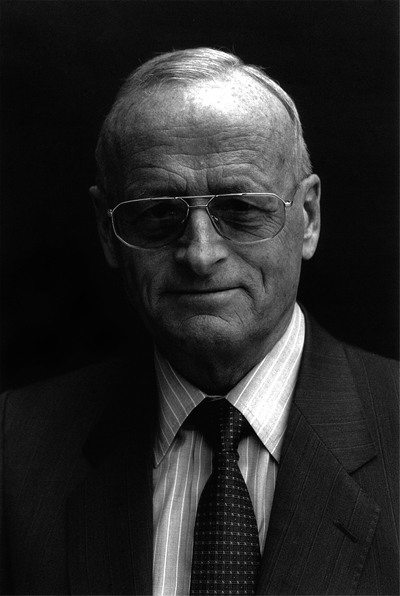
- Born: Carl Horst Hahn; 1 July 1926; Chemnitz, Saxony, Weimar Republic
- Died: 14 January 2023 (aged 96); Wolfsburg, Lower Saxony, Germany
- Known for: Chairman emeritus of Volkswagen Group

Carl Horst Hahn (1 July 1926 – 14 January 2023) was a German businessman and head of the Volkswagen Group from 1982 to 1993. He served as the chairman of the board of management of the parent company, Volkswagen AG (formerly Volkswagenwerk AG). During his tenure, the group's car production increased from two million units in 1982 to 3.5 million a decade later.

== Life and career ==
=== Early life and education ===
Hahn was born in Chemnitz, and grew up near the town. His father had been a senior manager of the German car and motorcycle company DKW and was a co-founder of the Auto Union in 1932, which later evolved into the Audi car brand. Hahn studied business administration at the University of Cologne and the University of Zurich, and economics and politics in the UK and France. In 1952, Hahn received his doctorate in economics at the University of Berne in Switzerland. He went to Perugia for a year to study art history, intending to volunteer at Fiat.

=== Early career ===
Before joining Volkswagen, he worked as an economist at the OECD in Paris in the European Productivity Agency. In 1954 Hahn joined VW as an assistant of chairman Heinrich Nordhoff, and in 1955 became head of sales promotion in VW's export department.

=== Volkswagen of America, 1959–1965 ===
In 1959, Nordhoff made him president of the company's U.S. subsidiary, Volkswagen of America. Under Hahn's leadership, Volkswagen of America began a national advertising campaign to attract more attention to its quirky Beetle sedan and Microbus wagon. Hahn soon hired the Doyle Dane Bernbach ad agency. Its print and television ads for the Volkswagen brand respected the customer's intelligence, gave detailed information about Volkswagen's products, and made fun of the unorthodox qualities of the cars. The ads became cultural icons as much as the cars did. As the Beetle served a market segment that American car builders did not cover, Volkswagen enjoyed exceptional sales in the U.S. in the 1960s and early 1970s. Hahn became a beloved figure in the United States before his return to Germany in 1965, having been affectionately nicknamed "Mr. Volkswagen" by VW enthusiasts. Hahn became a member of the board of VW in 1964.

=== Chairman of Volkswagen AG, 1982–1993 ===
In 1973, Hahn left VW and returned to Hannover, Germany, to lead the German tire company Continental AG. Subsequently, in 1982, with the image of Starverkäufer (star seller), he returned to VW to become chairman of the company. Under his leadership, Volkswagen entered a cooperation agreement with the Spanish car brand SEAT in 1982, bought a majority interest in 1986, and by 1990 owned the entire company. In 1985, Hahn was able to push VW's earnings up 140 per cent to $225 million based on sales of more than $21 billion, and he was credited with pushing VW beyond the one-car strategy left over from the era of air-cooled Beetles and the early success of the Volkswagen Golf Mk1 in the 1970s. The second-generation edition, introduced in Europe in 1983 and in North America in 1984, was one of the best-selling cars of the 1980s worldwide. Two out of every three Volkswagen vehicles sold in 1985 were Golfs, and 97,128-second-generation Golfs were produced at Volkswagen's Volkswagen Westmoreland Assembly Plant in Pennsylvania that year.

Despite Hahn's earlier success in leading Volkswagen of America, VW sales in the United States dropped during his tenure as VW chairman, from 171,281 units in 1982 to 75,873 in 1992, largely due to intense competition from American and Japanese carmakers. Soon after Hahn became chairman of VW, he tested an American Volkswagen Rabbit built at the Westmoreland plant, which had opened in 1978, and he was deeply disappointed in how the Rabbit had been changed. The car had been re-engineered to drive like an American family sedan, with softer suspension and shock absorbers. "When I drove the American Rabbit, it felt like a Chevrolet", he complained. "If you want a Chevrolet, you should go to General Motors." Hahn fired Volkswagen of America president James McLernon, a former Chevrolet engineer who had been tapped by VW to get the Westmoreland plant up and running. Hahn brought in new management and kept the Westmoreland factory open to produce the second-generation Golf as a hedge against currency fluctuation between the German mark (DM) and the U.S. dollar, but inefficient production and soft sales in North America caused VW to close the plant in 1988.

In 1984, Hahn initiated engagement in the Chinese market, sooner than European competitors. After the fall of the Iron Curtain in 1991 Volkswagen entered a joint venture with the Czech company Škoda Auto. Hahn's acquisitions made Volkswagen a global force, and affirmed its place as Europe's largest automaker. Hahn could not keep manufacturing and development costs under control in the early 1990s, and he was replaced as Volkswagen CEO by Ferdinand Piëch in 1993. Hahn was a member of the advisory board of VW until 1997. He helped clean up VW's business practices, dealing with a case of foreign exchange fraud, but its $300 million cost to Volkswagen ate into the very profits Hahn had helped the company make.

=== Personal life ===
While stationed in the U.S., Hahn married Marisa Lea Traina; three of their four children were born in the U.S. His wife died in 2013. Hahn died on 14 January 2023, aged 96.

== Legacy ==
Former Volkswagen of America president Bill Young, in an interview with journalist David Kiley, explained Hahn's record as chairman of VW: "Dr. Hahn had a lot on his plate in the 1980s, and VW was an organization that he was not suited or equipped to turn upside down the way Piech did."
