= Richard E. Dauch =

American businessman

- Born: July 23, 1942; Norwalk, Ohio, U.S.
- Died: August 2, 2013 (aged 71); Bloomfield Hills, Michigan, U.S.
- Education: Purdue University
- Occupations: Businessman; Chairman of American Axle

Richard E. "Dick" Dauch (July 23, 1942 – August 2, 2013) was an American businessman, and co-founder and Executive Chairman of the Board of American Axle and Manufacturing, now Dauch Corporation. Previously, Dauch served as a manufacturing manager at Chevrolet, Chrysler and at Volkswagen's Westmoreland Assembly Plant.

== Background ==
Dauch was born in Norwalk, Ohio, in 1942 to W.G. Albert and Helen Dauch, the youngest of their seven children. After high school, he attended Purdue University, where he played football before graduating in 1964 with a Bachelor of Science in Industrial Management and Science. He married Sandy Rule in 1960, and they have four children.

Dauch contributed $3 million to an 67,000-square-foot (6,200 m^{2}) alumni center at Purdue University and served as chair for the 2006 United Way torch drive.

== General Motors, Volkswagen and Chrysler ==
Dauch joined General Motors as a college graduate-in-training assigned to the Chevrolet Motor Division's Flint, Michigan, car and truck assembly plant. By 1973, at the age of 30, he was named the youngest plant manager in the history of the Chevrolet Motor Division. After a stint as Assistant Sales Manager in the Chevrolet Detroit Zone, he was appointed Plant Manager Chevrolet Gear and Axle (one of the five plants he later acquired to co-found American Axle and Manufacturing). In 1976, Dauch became Vice President of Manufacturing for Volkswagen Manufacturing of America, where he managed the manufacturing facilities (Volkswagen Westmoreland Assembly), the first volume automotive transplant in the United States.

Dauch joined Chrysler in April 1980, as Vice President of Diversified operations, where he helped re-engineer their manufacturing systems, establishing just-in-time material management systems and the three shift manufacturing vehicle assembly process. Dauch retired from Chrysler in 1991 as Executive Vice President of Worldwide Manufacturing.

== American Axle and Manufacturing ==
In 1993, Dauch headed an investment group that acquired five General Motors parts plants in Michigan and New York to form American Axle and Manufacturing. It became a stand-alone tier one automotive supplier on March 1, 1994. American Axle has become a publicly traded company on the New York Stock Exchange, and has grown from its original five plants to 35 locations worldwide.

== American Drive ==
Dauch has written a book about his experiences called American Drive: How Manufacturing Will Save Our Country , written with co-author Hank H. Cox. The book was published in September 2012. The book narrates the story of AAM against the backdrop of nearly fifty years in the auto industry, from America's glory days to its massive decline in the face of foreign competition, the government bailouts, battles with unions, and the recent financial crisis.

== Death ==
Dauch died on August 2, 2013, of cancer in his home in Bloomfield Hills, Michigan, according to the Oakland County medical examiner's office. American Axle said in a statement, "Our thoughts and prayers are with Dick’s family and friends. All of us have lost a great friend and leader."

== Awards ==
1996 Automotive Hall of Fame's Industry Leader of the Year
1997 Michigan Manufacturers Association Manufacturer of the Year
1997 Crain's Detroit Business Newsmaker of the Year
1999 Detroit News Michiganian of the Year
2002 Detroit Regional Chamber's World Trader of the Year
2002 Wayne State University, College of Business Administration's Michigan Executive of the Year
2005 CEO Legend Award from Automation Alley
2006 Shien-Ming Wu Foundation Manufacturing Leadership Award
2012 AAM CEO Richard E. Dauch was named keynote speaker at Automotive Parts Manufacturers' Association Conference, MarketWatch.com, June 5, 2012.
