= Volkswagen Group =

German multinational conglomerate automotive manufacturer

Volkswagen Aktiengesellschaft

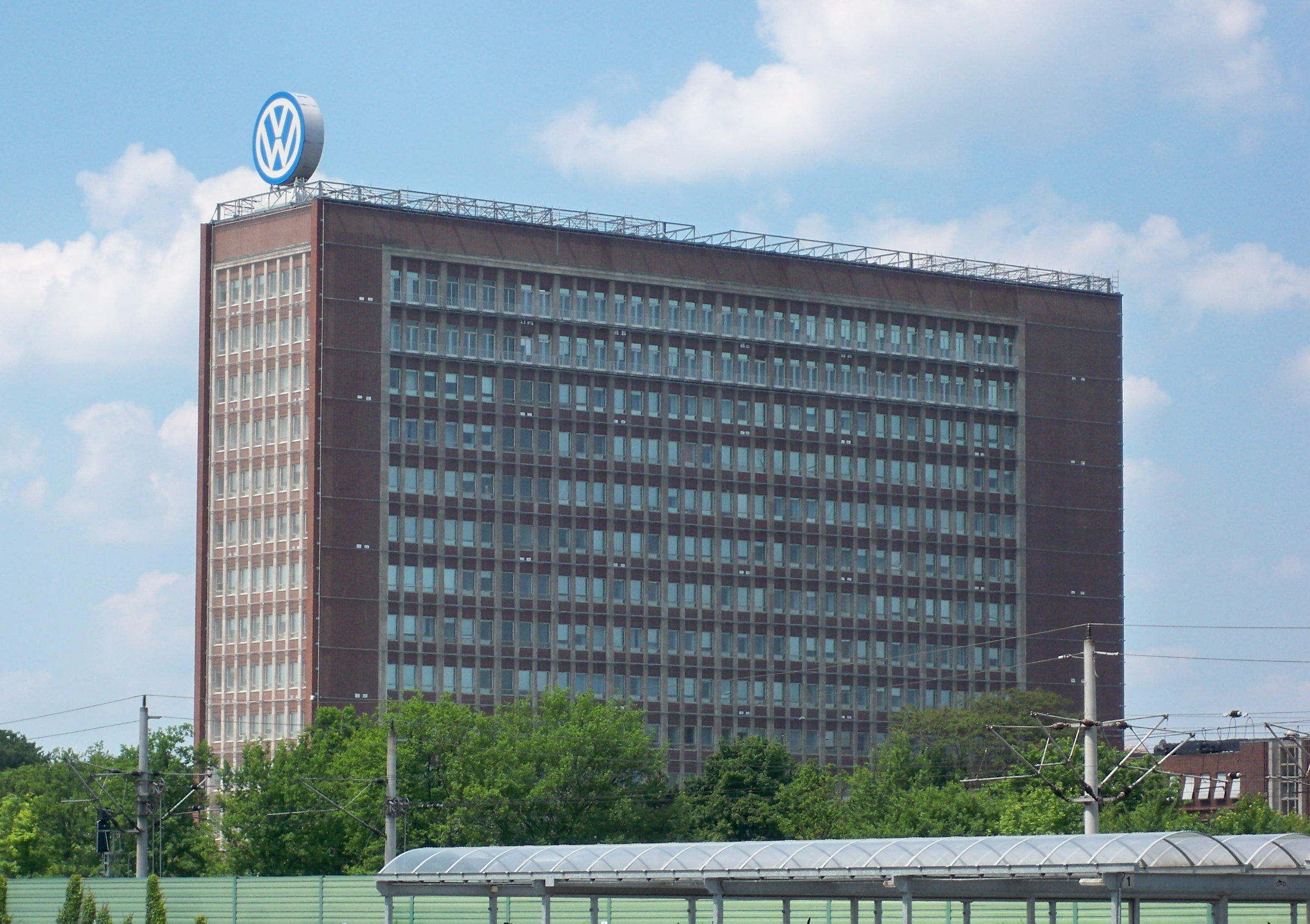
- Headquarters in Wolfsburg, Germany
- Trade name: Volkswagen Group
- Type: Public
- Traded as: FWB: VOW, FWB: VOW3; DAX component (VOW3)
- ISIN: DE0007664005
- Industry: Manufacturing
- Founded: 28 May 1937; 89 years ago, in Berlin, Germany
- Founder: German Labour Front
- Headquarters: Wolfsburg, Lower Saxony, Germany
- Number of locations: 100 production facilities across 27 countries
- Area served: Worldwide
- Key people: Hans Dieter Pötsch (chairman of the supervisory board); Oliver Blume (chairman of the board of management)
- Products: Automobiles, commercial vehicles, internal combustion engines, motorcycles, turbomachinery
- Production output: ▼8.98M (2025)
- Brands: Automotive: Audi Bentley Cupra Ducati Jetta Lamborghini Porsche Scout SEAT Škoda Volkswagen Cars; Commercial: IC Bus International Motors MAN Neoplan Scania VW Commercial Vehicles VW Truck & Bus; Design: Italdesign Giugiaro
- Services: Banking, financing, fleet management, insurance, leasing
- Revenue: ▼€321.913B (2025)
- Operating income: ▼€8.868B (2025)
- Net income: ▼€6.904B (2025)
- Total assets: ▲€644.467B (2025)
- Total equity: ▲€203.054B (2025)
- Owners: Porsche SE (31.9% equity; 53.3% voting); Lower Saxony (11.8% equity; 20% voting); Qatar Investment Authority (10.4% equity; 17% voting)
- Number of employees: ▲682,724 employees (average during 2024)
- Subsidiaries: Transportation: Traton (89.7%) Porsche Holding Volkswagen Marine; Financial services: Lamborghini Financial Services Bentley Financial Services Volkswagen Financial Services AG Volkswagen Leasing GmbH Porsche Financial Services Volkswagen Immobilien; Logistics: Volkswagen Group Fleet International Volkswagen Group Supply Volkswagen Air Service; Industrial: Volkswagen Industrial Motor; International: Volkswagen Group China Volkswagen Group Japan Volkswagen Group India Volkswagen Group of America Volkswagen Argentina Volkswagen Australia Volkswagen Group Canada Volkswagen Group Malaysia Volkswagen de México Volkswagen do Brasil Volkswagen Group Ireland Volkswagen Group Italia Volkswagen of South Africa Volkswagen Group Taiwan Volkswagen Group United Kingdom Audi
- Website: www.volkswagen-group.com

Volkswagen Aktiengesellschaft, (Note: German: [ˈfɔlksˌvaːɡn̩]) trading as Volkswagen Group, is a German multinational conglomerate automotive manufacturer headquartered in Wolfsburg, Lower Saxony, Germany. Since the late 2000s, it has been a publicly traded family business owned by Porsche SE, which in turn is half-owned but fully controlled by the Austrian-German Porsche-Piëch family. The company also offers financing, leasing, and fleet management services. In 2024, it was the world's second-largest automaker by sales. It has maintained the largest market share in Europe for over two decades. It ranked 11th in the 2024 Fortune Global 500 list of the world's largest companies. In 2024, Volkswagen Group was the largest company in the European Union and the largest car manufacturer in the world by revenue.

The Volkswagen Group sells passenger cars under the Audi, Bentley, Cupra, Jetta, Lamborghini, Porsche, Scout, SEAT, Škoda, and Volkswagen brands, motorcycles under the Ducati marque, light commercial vehicles under the Volkswagen Commercial Vehicles brand, and heavy commercial vehicles via the marques of the listed subsidiary Traton (International, MAN, Scania, and Volkswagen Truck & Bus). Software and techstack products are sold under CARIAD. It is divided into two primary divisions: the Automotive Division and the Financial Services Division. As of 2008, it had about 342 subsidiary companies. Volkswagen also has three joint ventures in China, FAW-Volkswagen, SAIC Volkswagen and Volkswagen Anhui. The company has operations in roughly 150 countries, and it has 100 production facilities across 27 countries.

Volkswagen was founded in Berlin in 1937 and incorporated in Wolfsburg to manufacture the car that would become known as the Beetle. The company's production grew rapidly in the 1950s and 1960s. In 1965, it acquired Auto Union, which subsequently produced the first postwar Audi models. Volkswagen launched a new generation of front-wheel drive vehicles in the 1970s, including the Passat, Polo and Golf; the latter became its bestseller. Volkswagen acquired a controlling stake in SEAT in 1986, making it the first non-German marque of the company, and acquired control of Škoda in 1994, of Bentley, Lamborghini, and Bugatti in 1998, Scania in 2008 and of Ducati, MAN, and Porsche in 2012. The company's operations in China had grown rapidly in the 2010s, with the country becoming its largest market. However, sales in China have declined significantly in the 2020s.

In 2015, Volkswagen was discovered to have used defeat devices to deceive environmental regulators about how much NO_{x} its cars were emitting. The company was fined over US$30 billion (€26.8 billion).

Volkswagen Aktiengesellschaft is a public company and has a primary listing on the Frankfurt Stock Exchange, where it is a constituent of the Euro Stoxx 50 stock market index, and secondary listings on the Luxembourg Stock Exchange and SIX Swiss Exchange. It has been traded in the United States via American depositary receipts since 1988, currently on the OTC Marketplace. Volkswagen delisted from the London Stock Exchange in 2013. The government of Lower Saxony holds 12.7% of the company's shares, granting it, by law, 20% of the voting rights.

== History ==
=== 1937 to 1945 ===
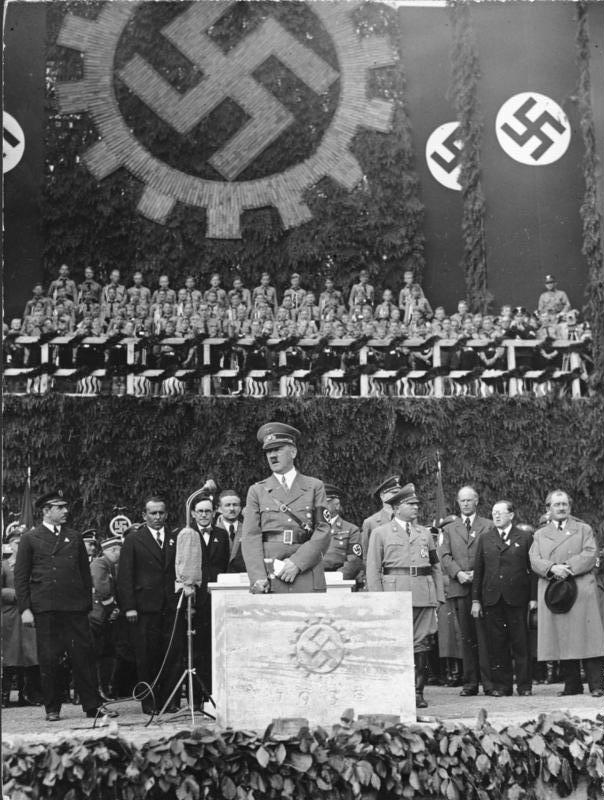
26 May 1938: Laying the foundation stone of the first Volkswagen plant by Adolf Hitler. In the front right is Ferdinand Porsche.

Volkswagen (transl. "People's car"; lit. 'People's wagon') was founded in Berlin as the Gesellschaft zur Vorbereitung des Deutschen Volkswagens mbH ('Limited Liability Company for the preparation of the German People's Car', abbreviated to Gezuvor) by the National Socialist Deutsche Arbeitsfront (German Labour Front) and incorporated in the Stadt des KdF-Wagens bei Fallersleben, ("City of the Strength Through Joy car at Fallersleben) on 28 May 1937. The purpose of the company was to manufacture the Volkswagen car, originally referred to as the Porsche Type 60, then the Volkswagen Type 1, and commonly called the Volkswagen Beetle. This vehicle was designed by Ferdinand Porsche's consulting firm, and the company was backed by the support of Adolf Hitler. On 16 September 1938, Gezuvor was renamed Volkswagenwerk GmbH ('Volkswagen Factory GmbH').

Shortly after the factory at Fallersleben was completed World War II started, and the plant primarily manufactured the military Kübelwagen (Porsche Type 82) and the related amphibious Schwimmwagen (Type 166), both of which were derived from the Volkswagen. Only a small number of Type 60 Volkswagens were made during this time. The Fallersleben plant also manufactured the V-1 flying bomb, making the plant a major bombing target for the Allied forces.

Slave labour was utilised in the Volkswagen plant, e.g. from the Arbeitsdorf concentration camp. The company would admit in 1998 that it used 15,000 slaves during the war effort. German historians estimated that 80% of Volkswagen's wartime workforce consisted of slave labour. Many of the slaves were reported to have been supplied from the concentration camps upon request from plant managers. A lawsuit was filed in 1998 by survivors for restitution for the forced labour. Volkswagen would set up a voluntary restitution fund.

=== 1945 to 1970 ===
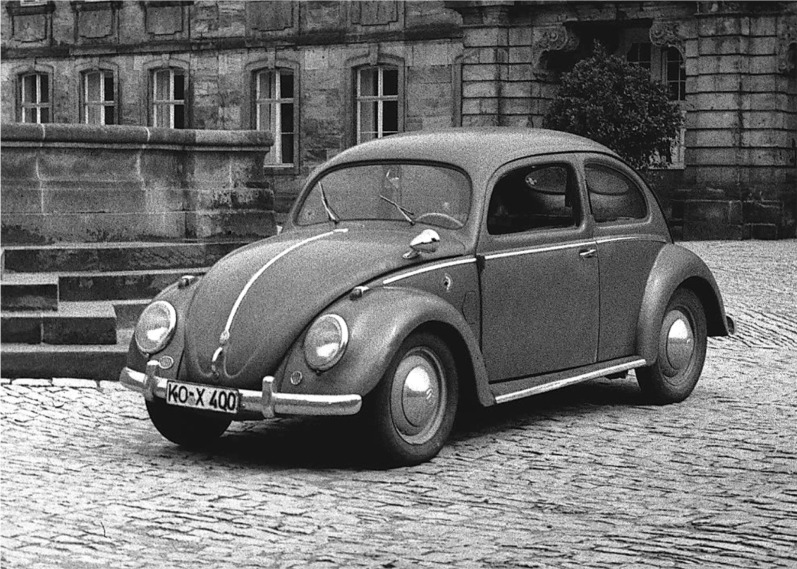
A 1951 Volkswagen Beetle

After the war in Europe, in June 1945, Major Ivan Hirst of the British Army Royal Electrical and Mechanical Engineers (REME) took control of the bomb-shattered factory for use in repairing British Army vehicles, pending the expected disposal of the plant tooling and equipment as war reparations. However, no British car manufacturer was interested. A British report on the car said that "the vehicle does not meet the fundamental technical requirement of a motor-car … it is quite unattractive to the average buyer … To build the car commercially would be a completely uneconomic enterprise."

In 1948, the Ford Motor Company of USA was offered Volkswagen, but Ernest Breech, a Ford executive vice president, said he did not think either the plant or the car was "worth a damn." Breech later said that he would have considered merging Ford of Germany and Volkswagen, but after the war, ownership of the company was in such dispute that nobody could possibly hope to be able to take it over. As part of the Allies' industrial plans for Germany, large parts of German industry, including Volkswagen, were to be dismantled. Total German car production was set at a maximum of 10% of 1936 car production numbers. The company survived by producing cars for the British Army, and in 1948 the British Government handed the company back over to the German state, to be managed by former Opel chief Heinrich Nordhoff.

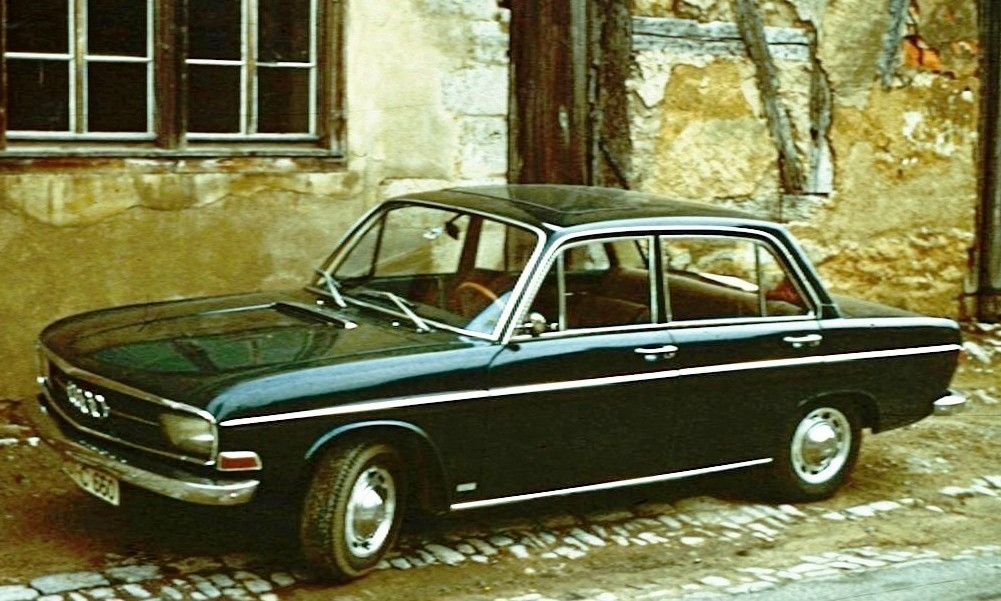
The Audi F103, in production from 1965 to 1972

Production of the Type 60 Volkswagen (re-designated Type 1) started slowly after the war due to the need to rebuild the plant and because of the lack of raw materials, but production grew rapidly in the 1950s and 1960s. The company began introducing new models based on the Type 1, all with the same basic air-cooled, rear-engine, rear-drive platform. These included the Type 2 in 1950, the Karmann Ghia in 1955, the Type 3 in 1961, the Type 4 in 1968, and the Type 181 in 1969.

In 1960, upon the flotation of part of the German federal government's stake in the company on the German stock market, its name became Volkswagenwerk Aktiengesellschaft (usually abbreviated to Volkswagenwerk AG).

On 1 January 1965, Volkswagenwerk acquired Auto Union GmbH from its parent company Daimler-Benz. The new subsidiary went on to produce the first post-war Audi models, the F103-series, shortly afterwards.

Another German manufacturer, NSU Motorenwerke AG, was merged into Auto Union on 26 August 1969, creating a new company, Audi NSU Auto Union AG (later renamed AUDI AG in 1985).

=== 1970 to 1999 ===
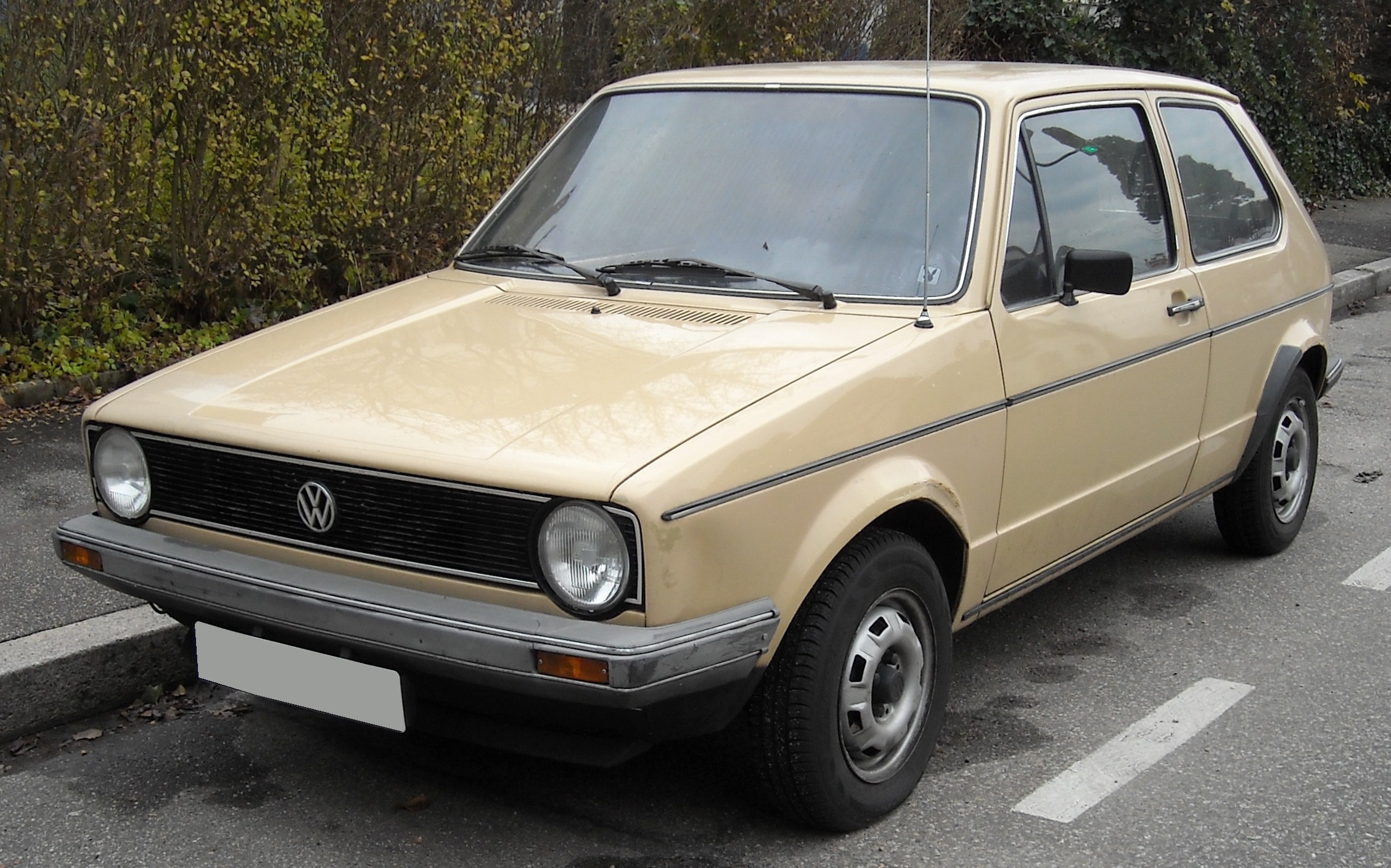
A Golf Mk1 - the Golf is the third-bestselling car of all time, selling over 30 million up to 2013.

From the late 1970s to 1992, the acronym V.A.G. was used by Volkswagen AG as a brand for group-wide activities, such as distribution and leasing. Contrary to popular belief, "V.A.G." had no official meaning, and was never the formal name of the Volkswagen Group.

On 30 September 1982, Volkswagenwerk made its first step expanding outside Germany by signing a co-operation agreement with the Spanish car manufacturer SEAT, S.A., which led to the first VW models being built in Spain within SEAT factories, ultimately leading on to the Spanish company's full takeover by Volkswagen (below).

To reflect the company's increasing global diversification from its headquarters and main plant (the Volkswagenwerk in Wolfsburg), on 4 July 1985, the company name was changed again—to Volkswagen Aktiengesellschaft (Volkswagen AG).

On 18 June 1986, Volkswagen AG acquired a 51% controlling stake in SEAT, making it the first non-German subsidiary of the Volkswagen Group. On 23 December the same year, it became the Spanish company's major shareholder by increasing its share up to 75%.

In 1990—after purchasing its entire equity—Volkswagen AG took over the full ownership of SEAT, making the company a wholly owned subsidiary, and on 28 March 1991, another step to the expansion of the group's activities was made through the signing of a joint-venture partnership agreement with Škoda automobilová a.s. of Czechoslovakia, accompanied with the acquisition of a 30% stake in the Czech car manufacturer on 16 April 1991.

On 19 December 1994, the group began the acquisition of Škoda Auto by raising its share to 60.3%. Later, on 11 December 1995, it became the Czech company's largest and controlling shareholder by increasing its share up to 70%.

Three prestige automotive marques were added to the Volkswagen portfolio in 1998: Bentley, Lamborghini, and Bugatti.

=== 2000 to present ===
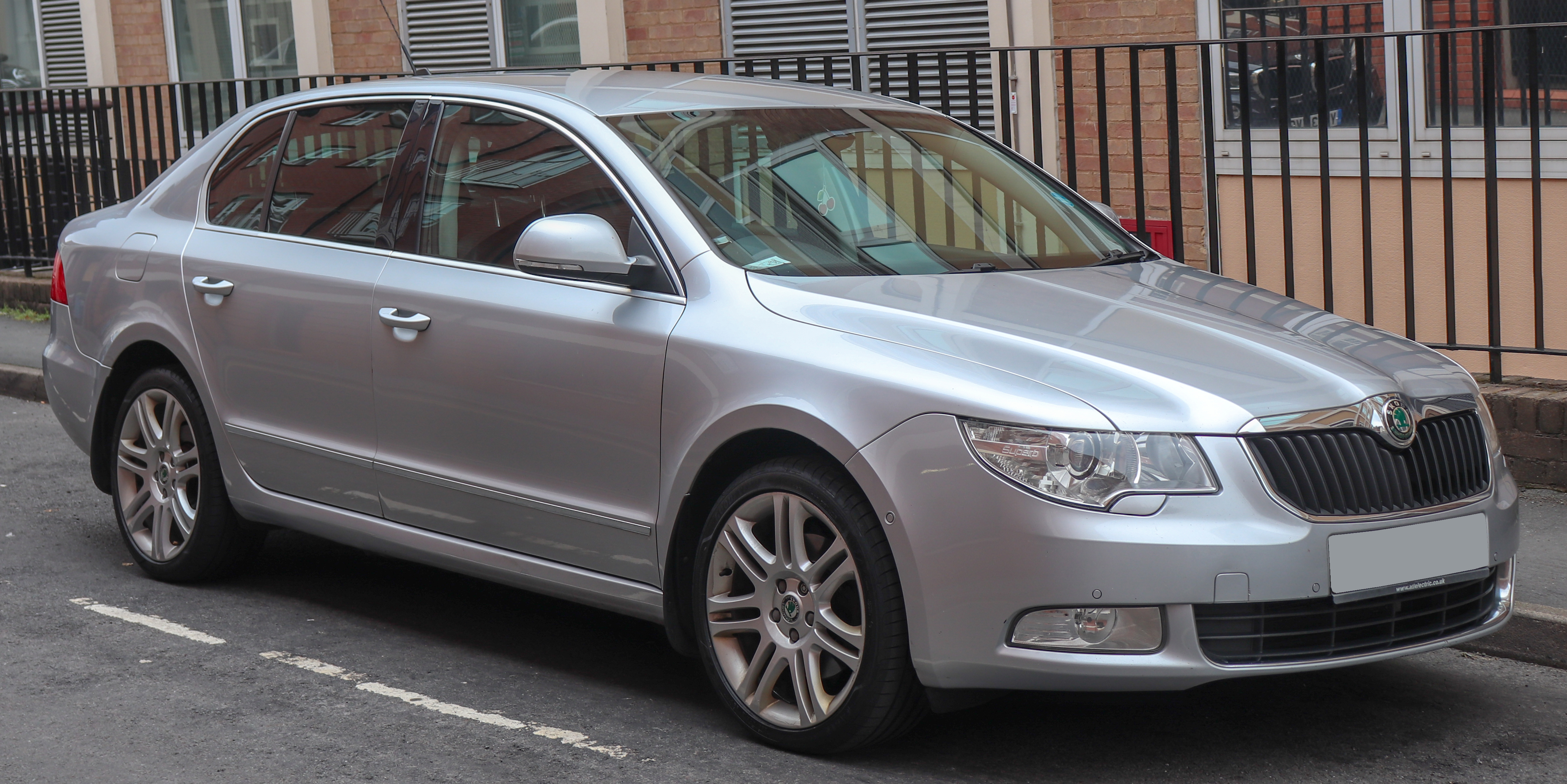
The Škoda Superb B6, in production from 2008 to 2015

On 30 May 2000, after having gradually raised its equity share, Volkswagen AG took over the full ownership of Škoda Auto, making the company a wholly owned subsidiary.

From 2002 to 2007, the Volkswagen Group's automotive division was restructured so that two major "Brand Groups" with different profiles would be formed. The Audi Brand Group included Audi, SEAT and Lamborghini, while the Volkswagen Brand Group consisted of Volkswagen, Skoda, Bentley and Bugatti.

Volkswagen Group revealed on 24 October 2009 that it had made an offer to acquire long-time partner and German niche automotive manufacturer Wilhelm Karmann GmbH out of bankruptcy protection. In November 2009, the supervisory board of Volkswagen AG approved the acquisition of assets of Karmann, and planned to restart vehicle production at their Osnabrück plant in 2012.

In December 2009, Volkswagen AG bought a 49.9% stake in Dr. Ing. h.c. F. Porsche AG (more commonly known as Porsche AG) in a first step towards an 'integrated automotive group' with Porsche. The merger of Volkswagen AG and Porsche SE was scheduled to take place during the course of 2011. On 8 September 2011, it was announced that the planned merger "cannot be implemented within the time frame provided for in the Comprehensive Agreement". As reasons, unquantifiable legal risks, including a criminal probe into the holding's former management team were given. Both parties "remain committed to the goal of creating an integrated automotive group with Porsche and are convinced that this will take place".

On 4 July 2012 Volkswagen group announced they would wrap up the remaining half of Porsche shares for €4.5 billion (US$5.6B) on 1 August 2012 to avoid taxes of as much as €1.5B, which would have to be paid if the wrap up happened after 31 July 2014. On 1 August 2012, Volkswagen AG purchased the remaining stake in Porsche AG equalling 100% of the shares in Porsche Zwischenholding GmbH, thus making Porsche the second German wholly owned subsidiary of the group after Audi.

Volkswagen AG completed the purchase of 19.9% of Suzuki Motor Corporation's issued shares on 15 January 2010. Suzuki invested part of the amount received from Volkswagen into 1.49% of Volkswagen. In 2011, Suzuki filed a lawsuit at an arbitration court in London requesting that Volkswagen return the 19.9% stake.

On 25 May 2010, it was announced that Volkswagen Group, through its subsidiary Lamborghini Holding S.p.A., had acquired a 90.1% stake in the Italian automotive design house Italdesign Giugiaro. In less than three months, the transaction had been completed making the Italian firm a member of the Volkswagen Group. Since 2013 the Volkswagen Group has held a 89.7% stake in Traton.

In 2015 research showed a security flaw in the keyless ignition of Volkswagen and other carmakers' vehicles. Volkswagen spent two years trying to keep the research from the public domain. On 3 August 2015, Nokia announced that it had reached a deal to sell its Here digital maps division to a consortium of three German automakers—BMW, Daimler AG, and Volkswagen Group, for €2.8B. This was seen as an indication that the automakers were interested in automated cars. Volkswagen held a 19.9% non-controlling shareholding in Suzuki between 2009 and 2015. An international arbitration court ordered Volkswagen to sell the stake back to Suzuki. On 17 September 2015, Suzuki paid US$3.8 billion (€3.4 billion) to complete the stock buy-back just hours prior to a major scandal about emissions violations engulfing Volkswagen. Suzuki had wished to buy Fiat diesel engines. In 2021, Volkswagen agreed to combine Bugatti with Rimac Automobili to form the joint venture company Bugatti Rimac. As part of this change, Volkswagen handed its 45% share to subsidiary Porsche AG. In 2026, Porsche sold it's share of Bugatti Rimac to an international consortium led by HOF Capital, a New York based investment firm.

In early 2024, Volkswagen Group began looking for partners among international technology corporations to create AI labs, new digital prototypes of products and functions using artificial intelligence. In October 2024, Volkswagen plans to close at least three plants in Germany and cut jobs, facing challenges from delayed EV investments and a drop in Chinese sales.

==== Emissions scandal, 2015 ====
On 18 September 2015, the US EPA announced that Volkswagen had installed a "defeat device" software code in the diesel models sold in the US from 2009 to 2015. The code was intended to detect when an emissions test was being conducted, and altered emissions controls for better compliance. Off the test stand, the controls were relaxed, and emissions jumped 35 to 40 times regulatory levels according to investigators at West Virginia University and the California Air Resources Board. About 482,000 vehicles are under the recall order, a potential US$18 billion (€16.2 billion) —US$37,500 (€33,800) per violation— in fines are pending, and news accounts speculate a criminal indictment for the deception is certain.

The VW Group CEO, Martin Winterkorn, said he was "deeply sorry" and ordered an external investigation. The software code was only revealed when the EPA refused to certify VW's 2016 models for sale in the US unless the corporation provided full disclosure. On Sunday, 20 September 2015, VW Group announced it was halting the sale of its four-cylinder diesel models in the US. The US EPA press release on its Notice of Violation, and the California Air Resources Board letter dated 18 September 2015 contain significant chronological detail of the agencies interaction with VW on the issue.

On 22 September 2015, VW AG admitted that 11 million cars worldwide had been fitted with software intended to deceive emissions testing. The company issued a profit warning, saying it had set aside US$7 billion (€6.3 billion) to fix the fraud. On 23 September 2015, Martin Winterkorn announced his resignation from the CEO position after a crisis meeting of the company board. On 25 September 2015 Matthias Müller was named CEO. Müller was the head of the Porsche marque within the VW corporate umbrella.

On 21 April 2017, a US federal judge ordered Volkswagen "to pay a US$2.8 billion (€2.5 billion) criminal fine for rigging diesel-powered vehicles to cheat on government emissions tests". The "unprecedented" plea deal formalised a punishment that Volkswagen AG agreed to earlier in 2017. In addition, the plea deal includes a US$1.5 billion (€1.3 billion) settlement for various environmental, customs and financial violations.

Overall, Volkswagen will pay more than US$30 billion (€26.8 billion) in penalties and lawsuit settlements related to the scandal.

==== Huge debt ====
In its own financial report for 2023 Volkswagen Group estimated its long, medium and short term debt at €155,6B. It is unclear how Volkswagen group plans to pay off that massive debt considering its falling global vehicle deliveries, planned closure of at least three factories in Germany after it previously closed two factories in Russia as well as 64% drop in profit for the three months to the end of September 2024. German Chancellor Olaf Scholz criticised Volkswagen's plan to close factories in Germany. He proposed a European subsidy program for electric vehicles.

Latest setback for Volkswagen came on 21 November 2024, when Swedish battery producer Northvolt filed for bankruptcy, Volkswagen previously invested €1.4B in their failed business. On 27 November 2024, Volkswagen announced sale of its Xinijang factory in China partly because "demand for combustion engine vehicles is going down".

==== Electrification strategy 2025 ====
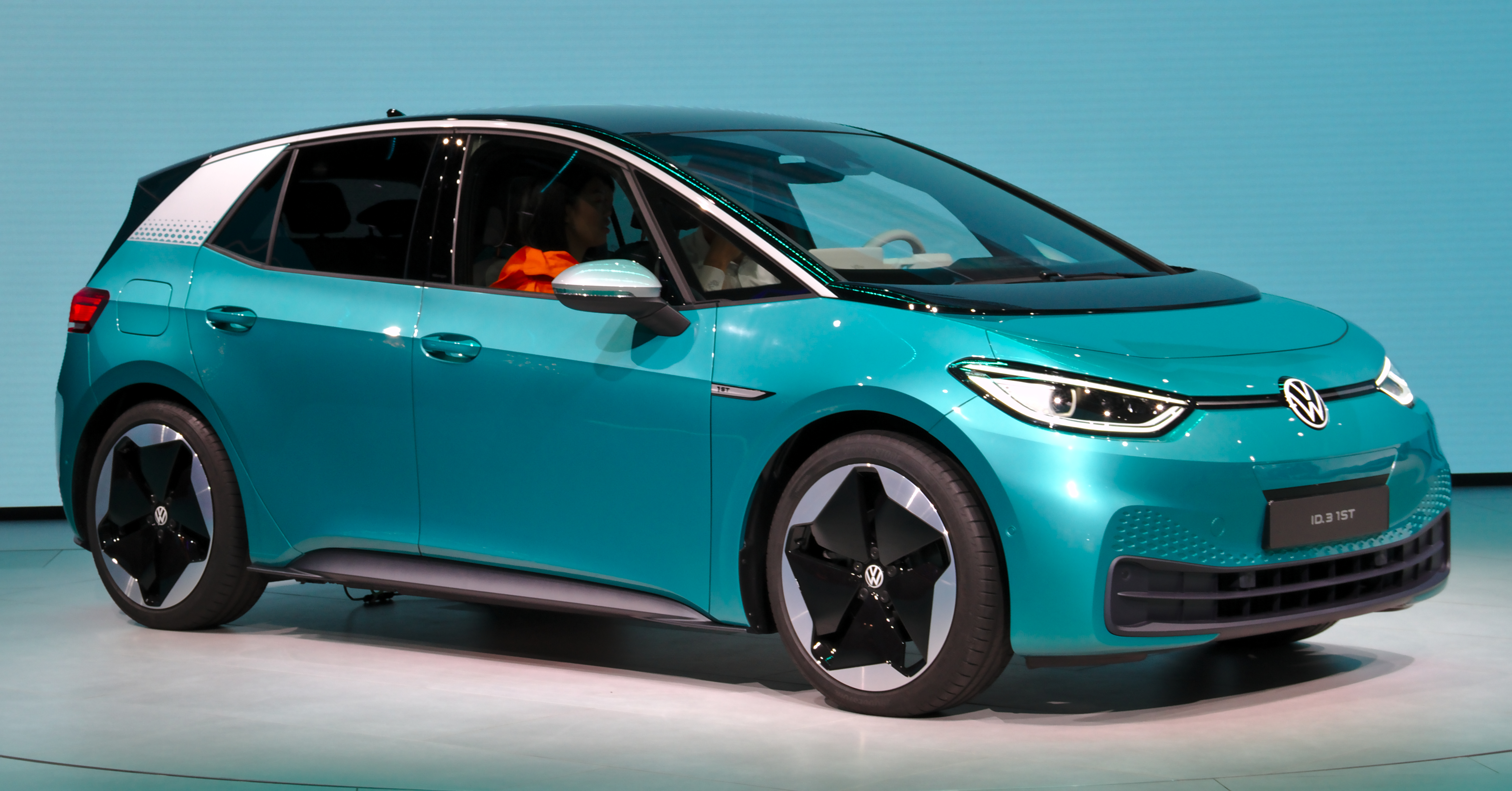
VW Group has invested in a wide-ranging electrification strategy in Europe, North America and China, with its electric "MEB" platform.

In 2016, Volkswagen Group announced a corporate "Strategy 2025" that focuses on electrification of its portfolio. The VW Group developed the Volkswagen Group MEB platform chassis that will be utilised in a range of various cars and light utility vehicles across several VW Group marques due to its flexibility and floor-mounted battery.

As of May 2018, the VW Group has committed US$48 billion (€41 billion) in car battery supplies and plans to outfit 16 factories to build electric cars by the end of 2022. According to VW Group CEO Dr. Herbert Diess, the company will offer 25 electric models and 20 plug-in hybrids by 2020.

==== Production in Xinjiang ====
Volkswagen Group came under pressure for cooperating with the Chinese government in the region of Xinjiang. In that same region, western-funded NGOs accused the Chinese government of having committed human rights abuses against the Uyghur minority group, which included mass surveillance, incarceration, and forced labour. After these accusations emerged, Volkswagen responded, "We do not assume any of our employees are forced laborers." Süddeutsche Zeitung claimed that Volkswagen was operating a plant in Xinjiang at a loss in order to curry favour with the Chinese government to set up more lucrative plants in other parts of China, which Volkswagen denied, saying that the decision to set up the plant in 2012 was purely based on economics. In November 2024, Volkswagen announced it would sell the plant to Shanghai Motor Vehicle Inspection Certification.

==== New Auto ====
In 2021, Volkswagen Group released their New Auto strategy. The strategy was based on transitioning to electric cars, and building a shared platform, battery systems, software and mobility solutions to use across all their brands. This involves creating the Scalable Systems Platform, as well as developing software under a new subsidiary CARIAD. Volkswagen Group aims by 2024 to transition to selling mostly electric cars. It aims to have six battery factories in Europe by 2030. In 2023, Volkswagen Group announced plans to cut costs by €10 billion (US$11.1B). In February 2024, Volkswagen Group and Chinese electric vehicle manufacturer XPeng signed a technology cooperation and joint development agreement on platform and software.

==== Restructuring (2026–present) ====
In March 2026, during the conflict involving the United States, Israel, and Iran, Volkswagen entered talks with Israel's state‑owned defence firm Rafael Advanced Defence Systems to explore converting its Osnabrück car plant into a facility producing components for the Israeli Iron Dome air defence system. The deal was reportedly blocked by the Qatar Investment Authority, which owns over 10% of Volkswagen shares and over 17% of its voting rights.

In July 2026, Volkswagen Group announced plans to cut around 50,000 jobs in Germany by 2030 as part of a broader restructuring amid growing competition from Chinese automakers, particularly BYD, alongside US tariffs and weaker profitability.

== Operations ==
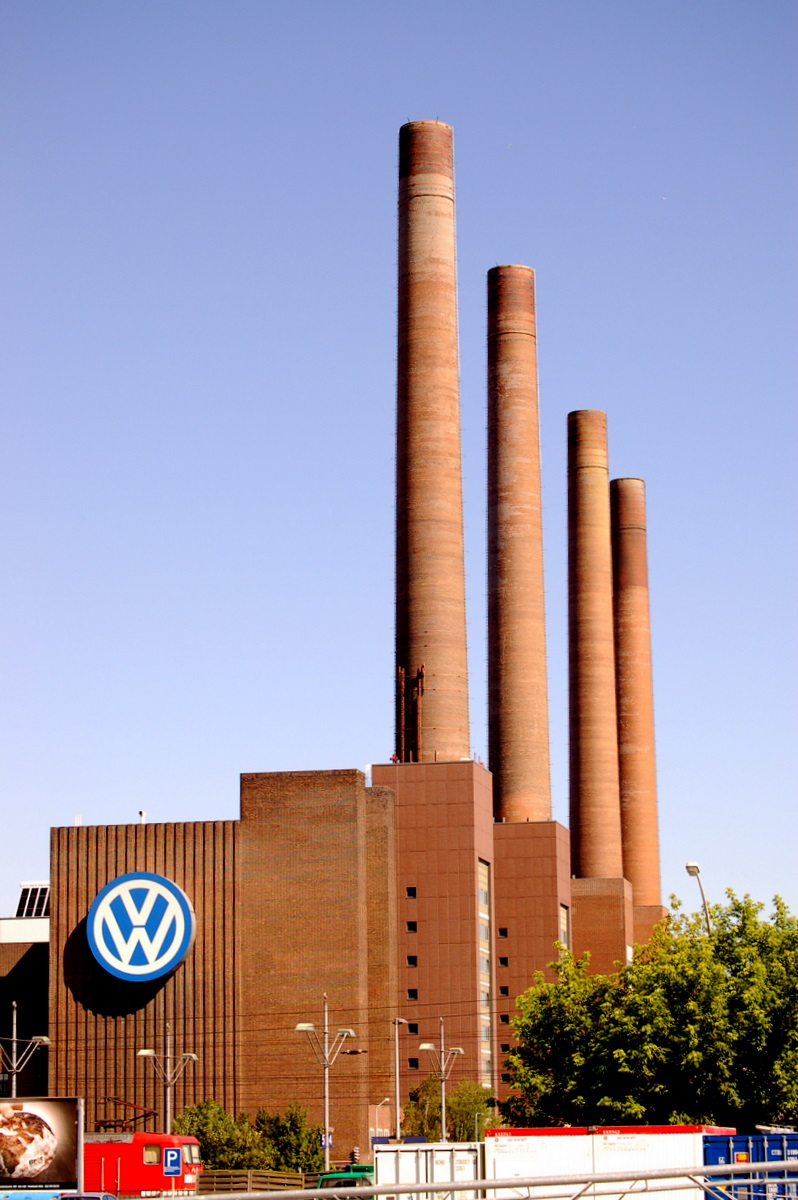
Part of the Wolfsburg Volkswagen Plant in Wolfsburg, Germany, its largest worldwide

Rooted in Europe, the Volkswagen Group operates in 153 countries. Volkswagen Passenger Cars is the Group's original marque, and the other major subsidiaries include passenger car marques such as Audi, Bentley, Lamborghini, Porsche, SEAT, and Škoda. Volkswagen AG also has operations in commercial vehicles, owning Volkswagen Commercial Vehicles, along with a controlling stake in truck, bus and diesel engine manufacturer Traton. In January 2026, the company was reported to be among the top 30 global investors in research and development (R&D) in 2025.

== Brands ==
The following active brands operate under the Volkswagen Group:

Brand	Origin	Established	CEO
Audi	Germany	1909	Gernot Döllner
Bentley	United Kingdom	1919	Frank Walliser
Cupra	Spain	2018	Markus Haupt
Ducati	Italy	1926	Claudio Domenicali
Jetta	China	2019	Dong Xiuhui
Lamborghini	Italy	1963	Stephan Winkelmann
Porsche	Germany	1931	Michael Leiters
Scout	United States	2022	Scott Keogh
SEAT	Spain	1950	Markus Haupt
Škoda	Czech Republic	1896	Klaus Zellmer
Volkswagen	Germany	1937	Thomas Schäfer
Volkswagen Commercial Vehicles	Germany	1995	Stefan Mecha

The following defunct brands are managed through the companies Auto Union GmbH and NSU GmbH, both of which are 100% owned by Audi AG:

Brand	Origin	Established	Defunct
Auto Union	Germany	1932	1969
DKW	Germany	1916	1966
Horch	Germany	1904	1959
NSU	Germany	1873	1977
Wanderer	Germany	1896	1945

== Operating structure and subsidiaries ==
The Volkswagen Group is operationally divided into four 'brand groups'.

=== Core brand group ===
The Core brand group is led by the Volkswagen Passenger Cars brand. It was formerly called the 'Volume' brand group until 2023.

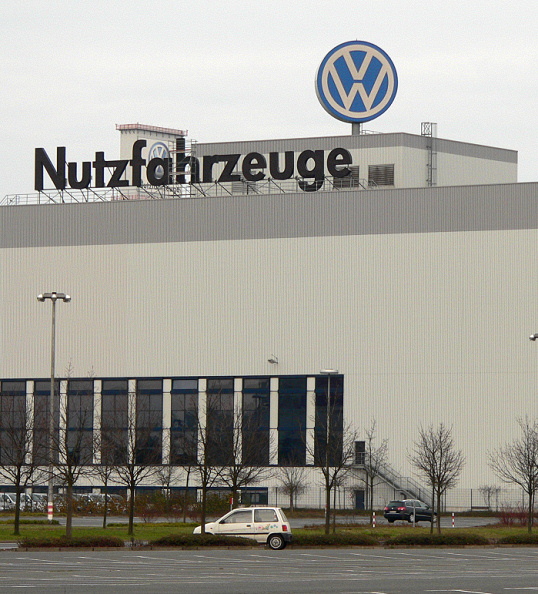
The Volkswagen Commercial Vehicles assembly plant in Hannover, Germany

- Volkswagen Passenger Cars: 100% ownership — the founding and flagship marque of the company.
  - Jetta: brand created in 2019 by FAW-Volkswagen, a Chinese joint venture between Volkswagen and First Automotive Works.
  - SEAT, S.A.: 100% ownership — initially in 1982 a co-operation agreement with AUDI AG; 51% and 75% ownership in 1986, and full ownership in 1990. SEAT was the first non-German subsidiary of the Volkswagen Group.
    - Cupra: 100% ownership by SEAT. In 2018, SEAT's motorsport division SEAT Sport was renamed Cupra Racing and at the same time, Cupra was launched as an independent brand alongside SEAT.
  - Škoda Auto a.s.: 100% ownership — initially in 1991 a co-operation agreement and 30% ownership; 60.3% and 70% ownership in 1994 and 1995 respectively, 100% ownership since 2000.
  - Volkswagen Commercial Vehicles (Volkswagen Nutzfahrzeuge): 100% ownership — Volkswagen's light commercial vehicle division started operations as an independent entity in 1995.

=== Progressive brand group ===
The Progressive brand group is led by the Audi brand. It was formerly called the 'Premium' brand group until 2023.

- Audi AG: 100% ownership — The current company was formed through the acquisitions of Auto Union from Daimler-Benz on 30 December 1964, and NSU Motorenwerke on 9 March 1969 - Audi being the sole surviving marque from the Auto Union combine.
  - Audi Sport GmbH — Audi's performance engineering and manufacturing subsidiary.
  - Automobili Lamborghini S.p.A.: 100% ownership — acquired by AUDI AG in September 1998.
    - Ducati Motor Holding S.p.A.: 100% ownership — bought via Lamborghini S.p.A. on 19 July 2012.
  - Bentley Motors Limited: 100% ownership. Volkswagen purchased Rolls-Royce Motors and Bentley from Vickers on 28 July 1998, however the purchase did not include the license to use the Rolls-Royce trademark on automobiles, which is controlled by Rolls-Royce Holdings plc. BMW outmaneuvered Volkswagen, succeeding in obtaining the rights to use the Rolls-Royce trademark on automobiles. From July 1998 until December 2002, BMW continued to supply engines for the Rolls-Royce Silver Seraph and the Bentley division sold cars under both the Bentley and Rolls-Royce marques, under an agreement with BMW. In January 2022, Bentley became part of the Audi Group.

=== Sport & Luxury brand group ===
The Sport & Luxury brand group consists only of the Porsche brand. Under the leadership of Porsche, the Sport & Luxury brand group previously included Bentley and Bugatti. Bentley was transferred to Audi in 2022 and Bugatti left the Volkswagen Group in 2021, as a result of the combination with Rimac Automobili to form Bugatti Rimac.

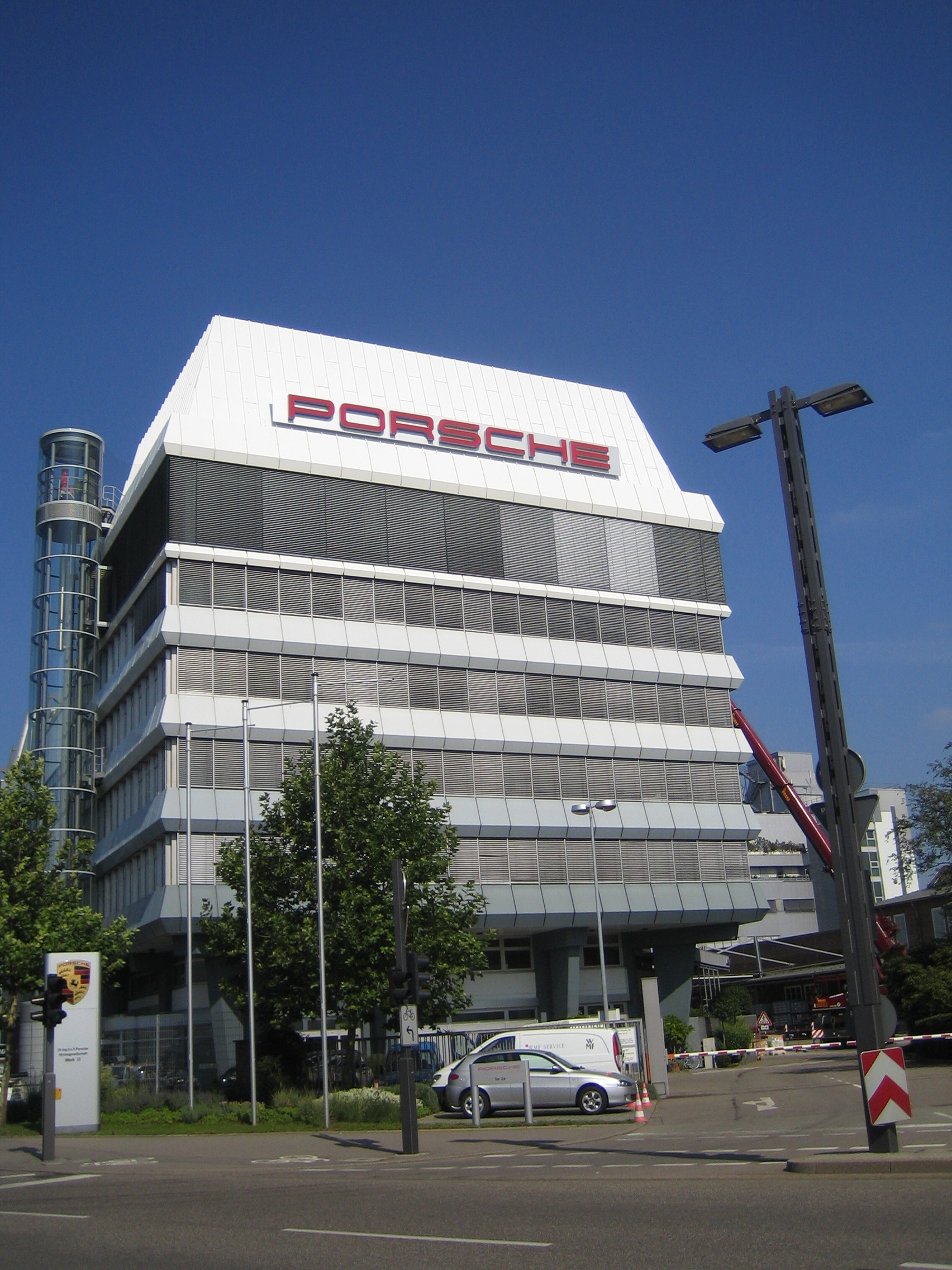
Porsche headquarters in Stuttgart

- Dr. Ing. h.c. F. Porsche AG: 75% ownership — Volkswagen AG purchased 49.9% of the shares in Porsche Zwischenholding GmbH (the holding company of Porsche AG) in December 2009. Volkswagen AG purchased the remaining stake in Porsche AG equalling 100% of the shares in Porsche Zwischenholding GmbH, effectively becoming its parent company as of 1 August 2012. 25% of shares sold in an IPO of Porsche AG in 2022.

=== Trucks brand group ===
The Trucks brand group, named 'Truck & Bus' until 2023, consists of the Traton Group, which was formed by the Volkswagen Group in 2013 when it brought together all of its heavy commercial vehicle brands into a single subsidiary.

- Traton SE: 87.5% ownership — Formerly Volkswagen Truck and Bus, TRATON is the holding company for Volkswagen Group's heavy commercial vehicle operations.
  - International Motors, LLC: 100% ownership — formerly named Navistar. Produces heavy trucks under the International brand and buses under the IC Bus brand. Wholly owned by TRATON SE since July 2021. Volkswagen Truck and Bus (now TRATON) took an initial 16.6% stake in February 2017.
  - MAN Truck & Bus SE: 100% ownership — Transferred to TRATON SE after it merged with MAN SE in August 2021. Responsible for the MAN and Neoplan brands.
  - Scania AB: 100% ownership — wholly owned by TRATON SE since 15 January 2015. Volkswagen acquired a controlling stake in July 2008, making Scania the 9th marque of the Volkswagen Group.
  - Volkswagen Truck & Bus: 100% ownership — Volkswagen's Brazilian heavy truck and bus division. Sold by Volkswagen Group to MAN SE in December 2008 and from that point was also known as MAN Latin America. In November 2011, Volkswagen acquired a majority of the shares in MAN SE, bringing Volkswagen Truck & Bus back into the group. Transferred to TRATON SE after it merged with MAN SE in August 2021.

=== Other subsidiaries and shareholdings ===
- CARIAD: 100% ownership
- Diconium: 100% ownership
- Everllence: 100% ownership — formerly called MAN Energy Solutions.
- MOIA: 100% ownership — new mobility services company.
- Scout Motors: 100% ownership — founded in 2022.
- Volkswagen Financial Services: 100% ownership
- IAV: 50% ownership
- Rivian and Volkswagen Group Technologies: 50% ownership — joint venture with Rivian.
- Gotion: 24% stake since 2022.
- Rivian Automotive: 16% ownership
- XPeng Motors: 4.99% ownership

== Corporate affairs ==
=== Business trends ===
Sales by business (2024)
Sector	Share
Passenger Cars and Light Commercial Vehicles	68.9%
Financial Services	16.7%
Commercial Vehicles	13.1%
Power Engineering	1.2%

Sales by region (2024)
Region	Share
Europe/Other Markets	44.1%
Germany	19.5%
North America	18.6%
Asia Pacific	11.8%
South America	5.9%

In April 2026, Volkswagen's market capitalisation was valued at €45.4B. The key trends for the Volkswagen Group are (as at the financial year ending 3 March):

Year	Revenue (€ B)	Net income (€ B)	Employees (k)	Deliveries (m)	Sources
1990	34.8	0.55	261	3.0	
2000	81.8	2.6	322	5.1	
2001	87.3	2.9	324	5.1	
2002	85.2	2.5	324	4.9	
2003	84.8	1.0	335	5.0	
2004	88.9	0.69	343	5.1	
2005	93.9	1.1	345	5.1	
2006	104	2.7	324	5.7	
2007	108	4.1	329	6.1	
2008	113	4.6	369	6.2	
2009	105	0.91	368	6.3	
2010	126	7.2	399	7.2	
2011	159	15.7	502	8.3	
2012	192	21.8	550	9.3	
2013	197	9.1	573	9.7	
2014	202	11.0	593	10.2	
2015	213	−1.3	610	10.0	
2016	217	5.3	627	10.2	
2017	230	11.6	634	10.7	
2018	235	13.9	656	10.8	
2019	252	12.3	671	10.9	
2020	222	8.3	663	9.3	
2021	250	14.8	673	8.8	
2022	279	14.9	675	8.2	
2023	322	16.0	679	9.2	
2024	325	12.6	680	9.0	
2025	321	6.9	663	9.0	

=== Ownership and leadership ===
Volkswagen (mbH, GmbH, AG) leaders
Tenure	Leader(s)
1937–1945	Bodo Lafferentz, Ferdinand Porsche, Jakob Werlin
June 1945–December 1947	Ivan Hirst (Note: Major Ivan Hirst of the British Army Royal Electrical and Mechanical Engineers (REME))
1 January 1948–April 1967	Heinrich Nordhoff
1 May 1968–September 1971	Kurt Lotz
1 October 1971–February 1975	Rudolf Leiding
10 February 1975–December 1980	Toni Schmücker
1 January 1982–December 1992	Carl Hahn
1 January 1993–16 April 2002	Ferdinand Piëch
16 April 2002–31 December 2006	Bernd Pischetsrieder
1 January 2007–23 September 2015	Martin Winterkorn
25 September 2015–12 April 2018	Matthias Müller
12 April 2018–31 August 2022	Herbert Diess
From 1 September 2022	Oliver Blume

Under the Volkswagen Law, no shareholder in Volkswagen AG could exercise more than 20% of the firm's voting rights, regardless of their level of stock holding. This law was supposed to protect Volkswagen Group from takeovers. In October 2005, Porsche acquired an 18.53% stake in the business, and in July 2006, Porsche increased that ownership to more than 25%. Analysts disagreed as to whether the investment was a good fit for Porsche's strategy.

On 26 March 2007, after the European Union moved against the Volkswagen law, Porsche took its holding to 30.9%, triggering a takeover bid under German law. Porsche formally announced in a press statement that it did not intend to take over Volkswagen Group, setting its offer price at the lowest possible legal value, but intended the move to avoid a competitor taking a large stake, or to stop hedge funds dismantling Volkswagen Group, which is Porsche's most important partner.

On 16 September 2008, Porsche announced that the company had increased its stake in Volkswagen AG to 35%. By October 2008, Porsche held 42.6% of Volkswagen AG's ordinary shares, and held stock options on another 31.5%. thus, effectively holding over 74%; 42.6% actual shares, and the rest as convertible options. Volkswagen AG briefly became the world's most valuable company, as the stock price rose to over €1,000 per share as short sellers tried to cover their positions. The substantial investment in Volkswagen left Porsche with huge financial burden with its debts accumulating up to €13B by 2009. Porsche would get emergency infusion of about US$1 billion (€716.9 million) from Volkswagen.

In July 2012, Volkswagen completed takeover of Porsche ending the four-year saga and formed an integrated automotive group with Porsche. Porsche AG would become the 10th brand of Volkswagen. The holding company Porsche SE was left with 31% of the subscribed capital of Volkswagen AG, and 50.7% of the voting rights in the company.

As of 31 December 2020, share ownership of Volkswagen AG is distributed as follows:

Subscribed capital:
Percentage	Shareholder name
31.4%	Porsche Automobil Holding SE
25.9%	Foreign institutional investors
14.6%	Qatar Holding LLC
11.8%	State of Lower Saxony
12.9%	Private shareholders / Others
3.4%	German institutional investors

Voting rights:
Percentage	Shareholder name
53.3%	Porsche Automobil Holding SE
20.0%	State of Lower Saxony
17.0%	Qatar Holding LLC
9.7%	Others

=== Stock market listings ===
Volkswagen AG shares are primarily traded on the Frankfurt Stock Exchange, and are listed under the 'VOW' and 'VOW3' stock ticker symbols. First listed in August 1961, the shares were issued at a price of DM 350 per DM 100 share, Volkswagen AG shares are now separated into two different types or classes: 'ordinary shares' and 'preference shares'. The ordinary shares are now traded under the WKN 766400 and ISIN DE0007664005 listings, and the preference shares under the WKN 766403 and ISIN DE0007664039 listings.

Volkswagen AG shares are also listed and traded on other major domestic and worldwide stock exchanges. In Germany's domestic exchanges, since 1961 these include those in Berlin, Düsseldorf, Hamburg, Hanover, Munich and Stuttgart. International exchanges include those in Basel (listed in 1967), Geneva (1967), Zürich (1967), Luxembourg (1979), London (1988), and New York (1988).

Since the start of trading in 1961, Volkswagen AG shares have been subjected to two stock splits – the first was on 17 March 1969 when they were split at a ratio of 2:1, from a DM 100 share to a DM 50 share. The second split occurred on 6 July 1998, the DM 50 share being converted into a share of no overall nominal value, at a ratio of 1:10.

From 23 December 2009, Volkswagen AG preferred shares replaced its ordinary shares in the DAX index.

=== Sales and market share ===
Top 3 Automakers — Global and EU
Group	Units	Share
Global, by global volume (2018)
Volkswagen	10,083,000	—
Renault-Nissan-Mitsubishi	10,076,000	—
Toyota	10,059,000	—
EU, new passenger car volume (EU27, 2013)
Volkswagen	2,957,653	25.0
PSA	1,311,406	11.1
Renault	1,076,367	10.4

In 2024, Volkswagen Group's largest single country market was China with 2.93 million units delivered, followed by Germany with 1.12M units. Divided by regions, Asia-Pacific was the second-largest market of the Volkswagen Group with 3.21M units in 2013, followed by Western Europe with 3.14M, and North America with 962,000 units delivered in 2024.

The European ranking of automakers is compiled monthly by the European Auto Manufacturers' Association (ACEA). Volkswagen has held the top spot in Europe uninterrupted for more than two decades.

The company was again the top global automaker in 2018, for the fifth consecutive year, selling 10.083M vehicles in the year 2018, just 7,000 more than the Renault–Nissan–Mitsubishi Alliance.

=== Co-management ===
All VW employees are represented by Works Councils and local trade unions in every country it operates with the exception of the United States. In Germany, the local trade union representing employees is IG Metall.

In September 2024, in response to the threat of mass layoffs at Volkswagen, German Economy Minister Robert Habeck said that the government would consider how it could help Volkswagen. In December 2024, tens of thousands of VW workers in Germany went on strike.

== Sponsorships ==
Volkswagen is heavily involved in sports sponsorship, with investments having included the 2008 Summer Olympics, the 2014 Winter Olympics, as well as the David Beckham Academy. Volkswagen AG wholly owns the Bundesliga football side VfL Wolfsburg; the company is also the shirt sponsor of League of Ireland Premier Division Sligo Rovers and top level of the Mexican football league system Liga MX team Puebla F.C.

== See also ==
- List of automobile manufacturers
- List of automobile manufacturers of Germany
- List of Volkswagen Group factories
- List of Volkswagen Group platforms
- Wolfsburg Volkswagen Plant
- Rivian and Volkswagen Group Technologies
- List of automotive manufacturers by production
