= Thomas Schäfer =

Thomas Schäfer may refer to:

- Thomas Schäfer (politician), German lawyer and politician
- Thomas Schäfer (diplomat), German diplomat
- Thomas Schäfer (manager), chief executive officer of Volkswagen Passenger Cars
- Thomas Jerome Schaefer, American mathematician

== See also ==
- Thomas Schaffer, Austrian gridiron football player
- Thomas L. Shaffer, American legal ethics scholar and dean of the Notre Dame Law School
