= Gerd Stieler von Heydekampf =

- Born: 5 January 1905; Berlin, Germany
- Died: 25 January 1983; Heilbronn, Baden-Württemberg, West Germany
- Occupations: Automobile Executive; Chairman of NSU
- Spouse: Elisabeth Stieler von Heydekampf (born Elisabeth Heuschen, 1908–1978)

Gerd Stieler von Heydekampf (5 January 1905 – 25 January 1983) was an engineer who became a leading figure in the German automobile industry during the 1950s and 1960s. He joined NSU in 1948, becoming the company's chairman in 1953. Following the takeover of the company by Volkswagen, he stayed on as chairman of the new conglomerate's Audi-NSU division till 31 March 1971 when he retired following a heart attack.

== Life ==
Gerd Stieler von Heydekampf was born into an old Prussian aristocratic-military family in Berlin during the economically dynamic first decade of the twentieth century. His father died in 1907. Between 1923 and 1927 he studied Mechanical engineering at the Braunschweig University of Technology, emerging with an engineering doctorate in 1929. He then spent several years working in the United States. Here he worked first for Babcock & Wilcox and then with Baldwin Locomotive Works. On returning to Germany he joined Adam Opel AG, Germany's largest automobile manufacturer, which in 1929 had been acquired by the US based General Motors Corporation (as it was known at the time). Within Opel von Heydekampf was soon promoted, in 1936 joining the board and taking charge of the company's purchasing function. Further promotion followed in October 1938 when he took over as General Manager, in succession to Hanns Grewenig, at Opel's new Brandenburg truck plant.

Régime change hit Germany in January 1933 and the Hitler government lost little time in imposing one-party government. The same year Stieler von Heydekampf became a Nazi Party member. He was then, in 1935, appointed a Wehrwirtschaftsführer (literally "military economic leader"), a quasi-military honour given by government to senior industry figures expected to be supportive in any future military rearmament programme.

In 1942 he left Opel where he was succeeded at the Brandenburg plant by Heinrich Nordhoff. Stieler von Heydekampf relocated to Kassel, becoming Director General at Henschel & Son and deputy chairman of the Henschel Group. Henschel had by this time become a major producer of tanks, and on 21 December 1943 he took over from Ferdinand Porsche the chairmanship of the Tanks Commission operating under Albert Speer's Ministry for Armaments and War Production. In effect this meant that Gerd Stieler von Heydekampf was now in charge of Germany's tank production until the war ended in May 1945. He presided over Germany's all-time tank production record year of 1944.

Following the end of the war Stieler von Heydekampf worked as a consultant to the NSU company in Neckarsulm, becoming an employee in 1948. In 1950 he joined the company's board, with responsibility for purchasing. Three years later, in 1953, he took over as General Director and Chairman. Under his leadership by 1955, with output of almost 300,000 units, NSU had become the world's largest producer of motorcycles. In 1957 the company was also able to return to automobile production, after a gap of 28 years. Following a pilot run of 150 preproduction cars, volume production began in March 1958.

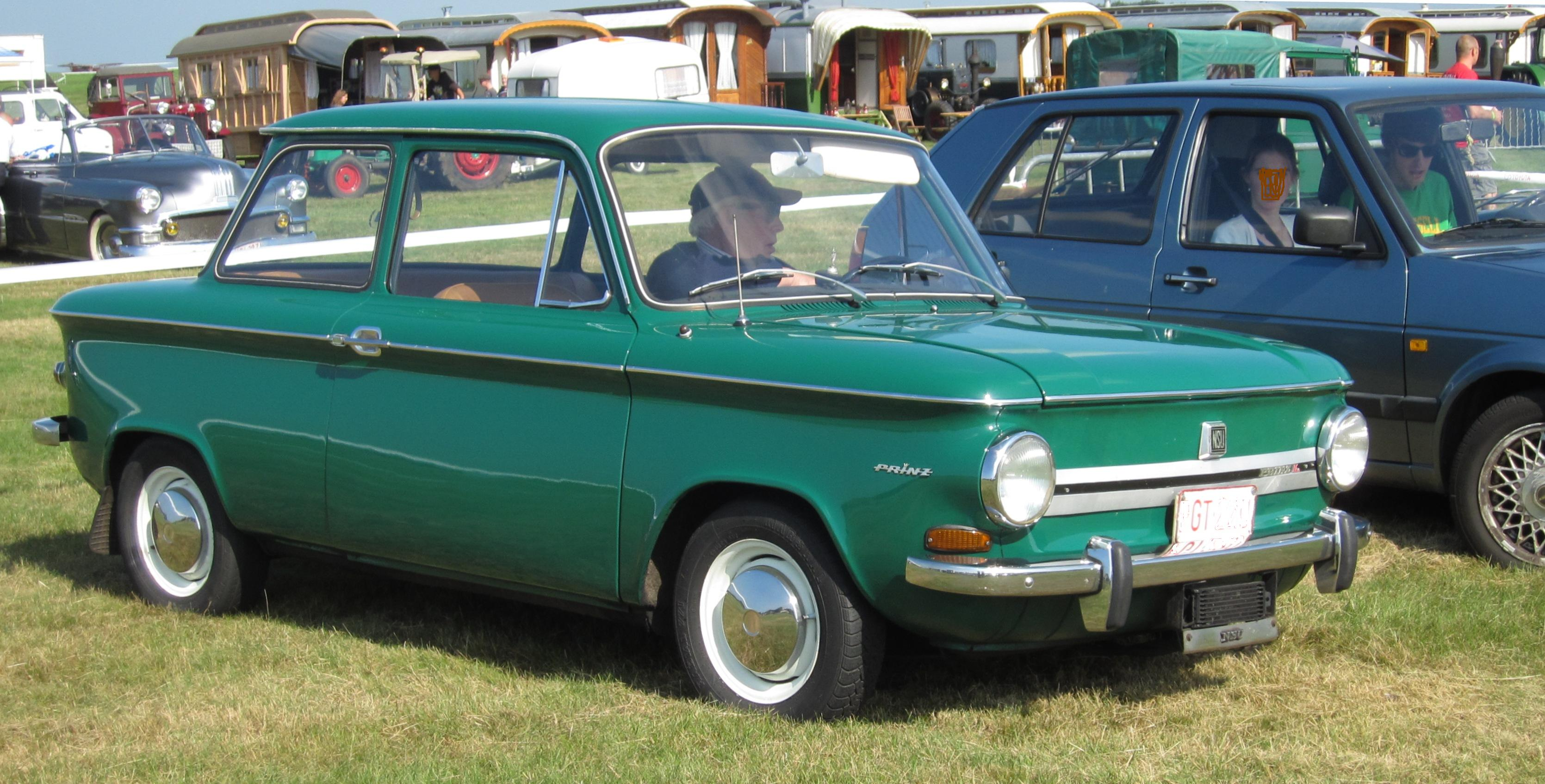
Under Gerd Stieler von Heydekampf the NSU company returned to automobile production in 1957/58.

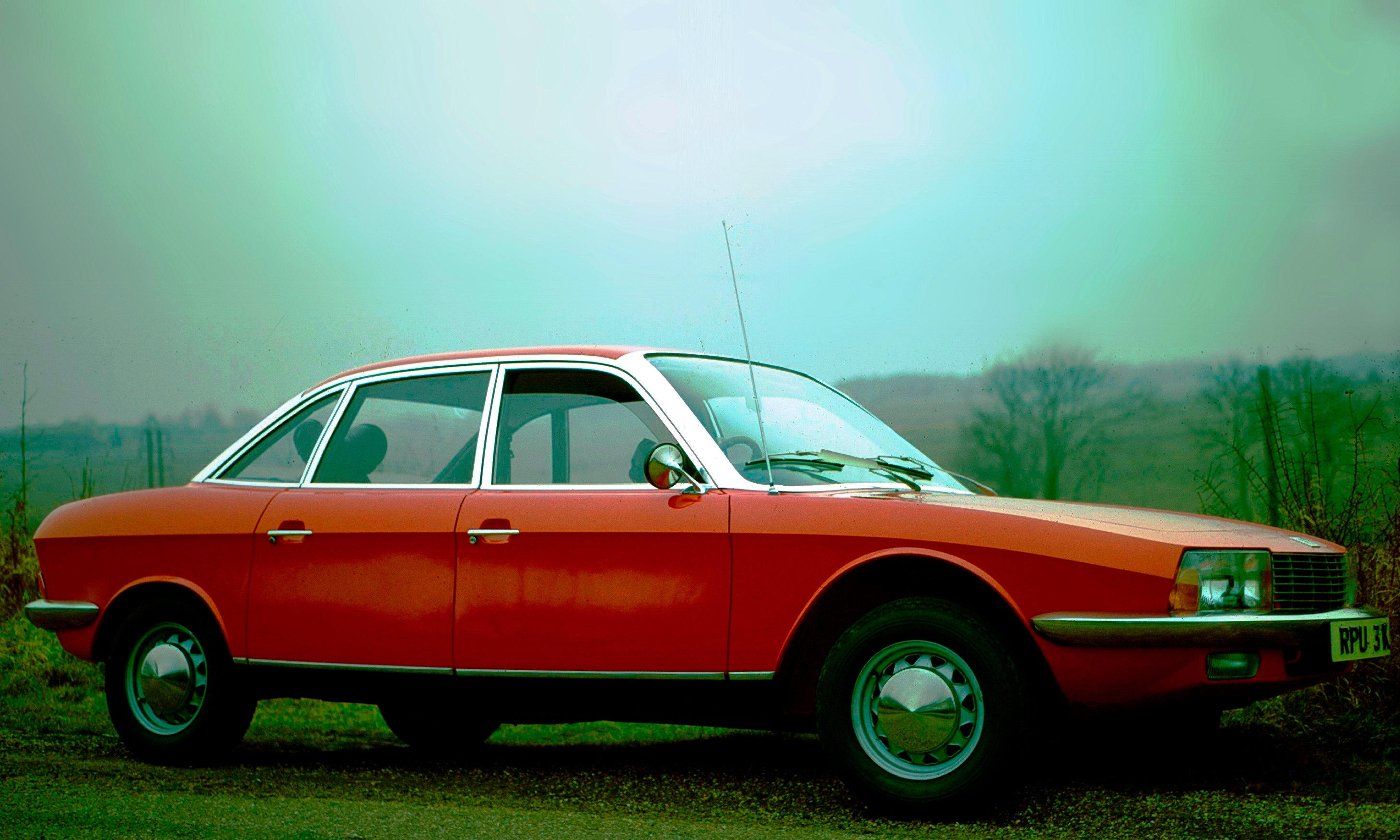
NSU Ro80

The 1960s were boom years for the German automobile industry. Following the bankruptcy in 1960 of the Borgward Group, the volume end of the business was represented by five domestic producers, of which Volkswagen, thanks to the runaway success of the Beetle, and Opel, supported by frequent model changes and the deep pockets of General Motors, dominated the sales charts. The other three, Auto Union-DKW, Ford and NSU survived with smaller market shares and all three struggled to fund new model investment. NSU had nevertheless acquired a license to develop the Wankel engine, during the 1960s investing lavishly in developing Wankel powered models of their own. Under Stieler von Heydekampf the first Wankel powered car, a small low volume open topped sports car, the NSU Spider, appeared in 1964.

However, it was the appearance in 1967 of the futuristic NSU Ro 80 which caught the attention both of the pundits and of the business press. Unfortunately, however, the ability of the engine to rotate faster, even before the engine had warmed up, than the developers had provided for led to major reliability problems for the Ro80. Massive enthusiasm for the car's virtues was accompanied by massive warranty costs as the company found itself replacing engines that had lost pressure in their revolutionary combustion chambers. Even in September 1963, when the Spider had first been exhibited at the Frankfurt Motor Show, doubts had been expressed as to whether a company the size of NSU would have the financial capability properly to develop and produce a car that was such a departure from the industry norm. The Ro80 represented a far more substantial and important investment than the Spider: it seemed the company had not been able to apply sufficient financial resource to developing it ahead of launch. Problems were exacerbated by insufficient training in preparation for the new technology across the company's dealership network. Engine problems were addressed in 1969 when the "soft carbon" used for the rotor-tip seals was replaced with a harder compound, and this development was accompanied with the fitting of a warning device that provided drivers with audible discouragement when they exceeded recommended engine speeds, but the reputational damage and the shortage of technical expertise across the dealership network was not so quickly addressed, and in the end only 37,395 Ro80s were manufactured, which was nothing like enough to recover the massive amounts invested in developing the car. Having gambled massively on the commercial success of the Ro80, Gerd Stieler von Heydekampf's final years at the helm of NSU were spent trying to save the company from bankruptcy.

One answer to the cost of developing the Ro80 was to team up with a larger automobile producer, and in 1967 it appeared that a solution might have presented itself in the shape of Citroën, already famous as a producer of futuristic cars, albeit cars which (less famously) were powered by relatively conventional engines that traced their origins back to the 1930s. In 1967 a partnership was announced whereby Citroën would invest substantially in development of the Wankel engine and, in return, manufacture and install the power units in their own cars. The commercial details of the deal were fearsomely complicated, and Stieler von Heydekampf had to confess that the unequal financial muscle that the two companies brought to the table might, ultimately, threaten NSU's independence. ("Ein finanzielles Übergewicht von Citroën ist natürlich zu befürchten." / "a financial preponderance from Citroën is naturally something that we fear.") By the time NSU had completely run out of financial options, however, two years later, Citroën's own financial problems had intensified and their enthusiasm for the Wankel project had begun to cool. It was Volkswagen that acquired the company. NSU still enjoyed a healthy income stream (with the possibility of more to come) from the licensing deals entered into back in 1966 with well over a dozen automakers including Daimler-Benz, General Motors, Porsche and Toyo Kogyo (Mazda): in the highly pressured negotiations the NSU shareholders were keen to avoid passing over to Volkswagen shareholders the potential income stream from future Wankel engine production by licensees. The deal that emerged was described in the press reports of the time as a "Fusion" (merger). Volkswagen had indeed acquired more than 50% of the shares in NSU, but the deal expressly reserved to the existing shareholders the income stream anticipated from the licensing deals for the Wankel engine. Interviewed in March 1969, Stieler von Heydekampf insisted that the deal was "not a sale [of the NSU business] but a transaction" ("...handelt es sich nicht um einen Verkauf, sondern um eine Transaktion, bei der die Majorität beim Volkswagenwerk liegt...."). It was nevertheless widely reported that Stieler von Heydekampf had been forced to agree to the "transaction" in order to secure the survival of NSU.

Volkswagen, who were by now encountering unplanned financial headwinds as the world's appetite for the Beetle finally appeared to have been satisfied, merged the NSU business with the Audi business which they had acquired five years earlier in another convoluted deal. During the next few years, Volkswagen acquired the remaining NSU shares. Gerd Stieler von Heydekampf stayed on as Chairman of Audi-NSU AG till 1971 when a heart attack triggered his retirement. His successor was Rudolf Leiding who himself would resign from Audi NSU before the year was out in order to take the top job at Volkswagen itself. In 1975 Audi-NSU AG moved its head office out of the Neckarsulm building from which Stieler von Heydekampf had directed NSU, to a new head office on the spacious Audi site at Ingolstadt in Bavaria.

== Burial arrangements ==
Gerd Stieler von Heydekampf and his wife lived for many years in Heilbronn. They also owned a second house in Stocksberg, a hamlet in the hills to the east of the city. In 1963 Stieler von Heydekampf hit the headlines nationally when he endowed a chapel with a little bell tower and a small cemetery at Stocksberg. In 1983, after he died, his body was buried in the little cemetery, together with that of his wife who had predeceased him by five years.
