= Matthias Müller =

Matthias Müller or Mueller may refer to:

- Matthias Müller (businessman) (born 1953), German manager at Volkswagen AG, and CEO of Porsche AG
- Matthias Müller (filmmaker) (born 1961), German experimental filmmaker and curator
- Matthias Müller (footballer) (born 1954), German footballer
- Matthias Müller (orienteer) (born 1982), Swiss orienteering competitor

== See also ==
- Mathias Müller (born 1992), German field hockey player
