= Oliver Blume =

German businessman

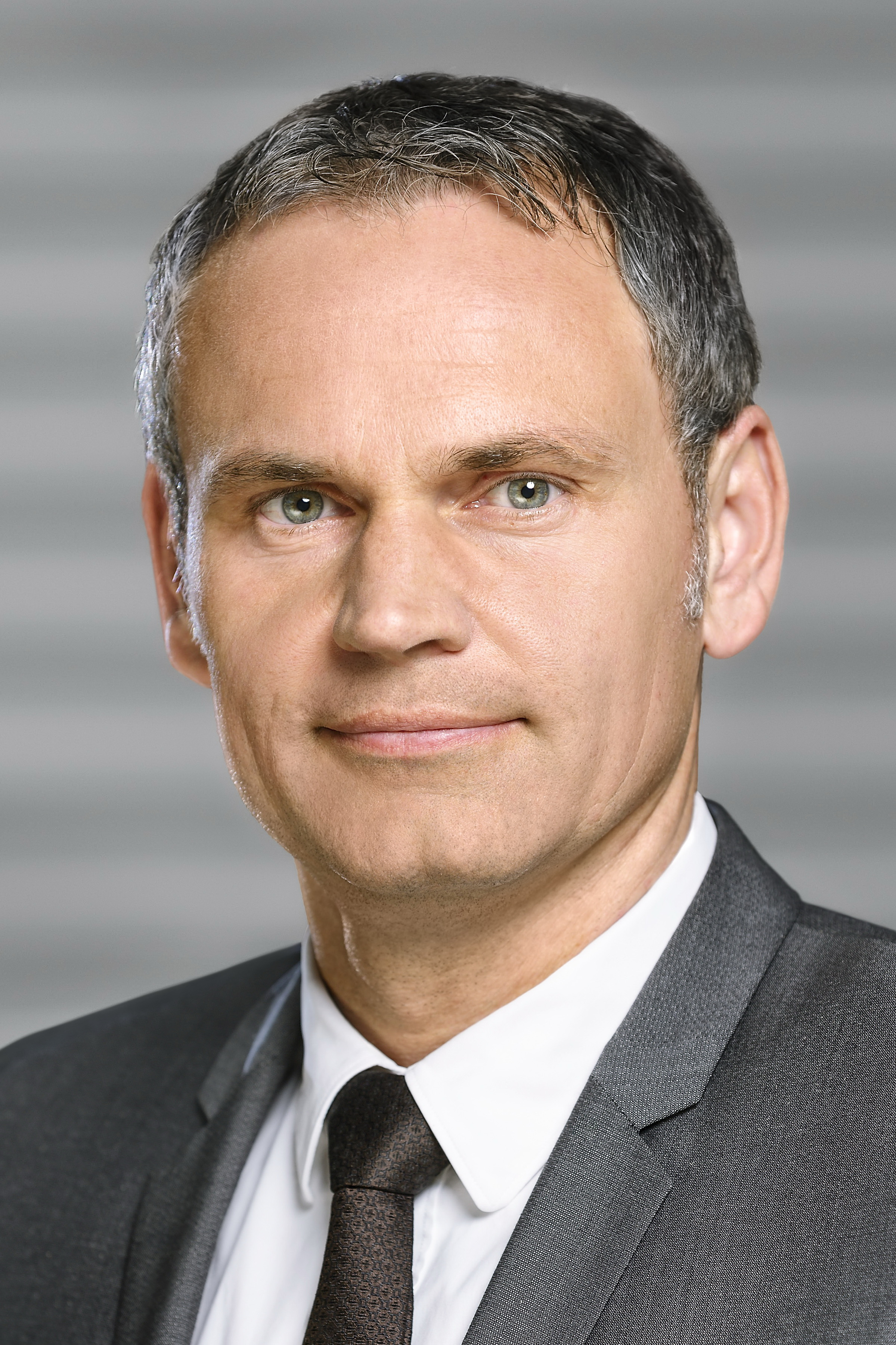
- Blume in 2013
- Born: Oliver Ingo Blume; 6 June 1968 (age 58); Braunschweig, West Germany
- Education: Technische Universität Braunschweig
- Occupation: CEO Volkswagen Group

Oliver Blume (born 6 June 1968) is a German executive and the CEO of the Volkswagen Group.

== Early life and education ==
Oliver Ingo Blume was born on 6 June 1968 in Braunschweig, West Germany. After completing his secondary education in Braunschweig, he pursued a degree in mechanical engineering at the Technische Universität Braunschweig (TUB).

He went on to earn a PhD in mechanical engineering from the TUB.

== Career ==
In 1994 Blume joined Volkswagen subsidiary Audi as a trainee, in an international trainee program. Thereafter, he is spoken of as "working his way up the ranks"; at age 28, he began work as a planner for body shop and paint operations at Audi. Three years later, he assumed responsibility for the body of the Audi A3, and two years after that, he was promoted to Executive Assistant for production at Audi.

He went on to work at Seat, the Spanish carmaker, where he spent 5 years involved in production planning. He moved to Volkswagen to head production planning in 2009, spending the next five years with that brand.

In 2013, he joined the board of the Volkswagen subsidiary Porsche, based in Stuttgart in southwest Germany, where he oversaw production and logistics.

Blume became CEO of Porsche in 2015. Volkswagen's board made the decision to appoint him in September 2015, and he begain serving in the role from the following October, continuing through the end of 2025. He succeeded Matthias Müller in the role, who went on to become CEO of the Volkswagen Group. In October 2022, Blume was appointed CEO of Volkswagen Group, replacing Herbert Diess (who had resigned in July 2022).

== Affiliations ==
As of the appearance of the Fraunhofer Society's 2023 annual report, Blume was serving as a member of that organisation's senate.
