= Ivan Hirst =

British army officer

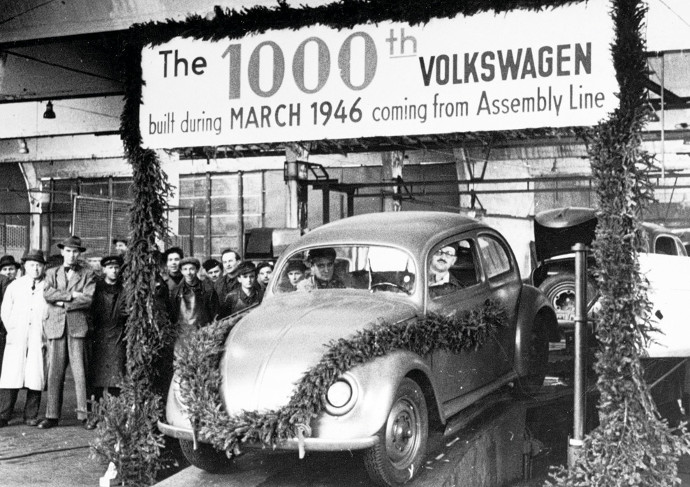
- Born: 1 March 1916; Saddleworth, West Riding of Yorkshire, England
- Died: 10 March 2000 (aged 84)
- Resting place: St Thomas' Church, Friarmere, Greater Manchester, England
- Citizenship: British
- Education: University of Manchester
- Occupation: Engineer
- Known for: Post-war revival of Volkswagen
- Spouse: Marjorie Pilkington Hirst (m. 1940; died 1992)
- Parent(s): Fred and Florence Hirst

Major Ivan Hirst (1 March 1916 – 10 March 2000) was a British Army officer and engineer. He was instrumental in reviving Volkswagen from a single factory in Wolfsburg, Germany, into a major postwar automotive manufacturer.

== Education ==
Hirst was born in Saddleworth, West Riding of Yorkshire, England and attended Hulme Grammar School in Oldham, across the county boundary in Lancashire. His family had founded the Hirst Brothers Company, a manufacturer of watches, clocks and optical components in Oldham. He studied optical engineering at the University of Manchester, prior to forming his own company repairing optical instruments. While a student he was a member of the university's Officers' Training Corps contingent.

== Army career ==
Hirst was commissioned as a second lieutenant in the 7th Battalion, Duke of Wellington's Regiment (Territorial Army) on 27 June 1934, and promoted to lieutenant three years later.

A captain on the outbreak of the Second World War, he was appointed adjutant on 1 October 1939. He transferred to the Royal Army Ordnance Corps (RAOC) as a Mechanical Engineering Officer on 14 November 1941, and to the Royal Electrical and Mechanical Engineers (REME) on its formation on 1 October 1942.

During the liberation of Belgium in late 1944, Hirst was posted there, in charge of a tank repair facility.

With his colleague, Colonel Charles Radclyffe, Hirst arrived in Germany in mid-1945, after the British Army took control of the town of Wolfsburg, including the Volkswagen factory. Soviet ground forces had already visited the factory after crossing the Mittelland Canal, but were not interested in it. Representatives of the US Army also reportedly visited and similarly showed no interest.

Inspecting the factory with a view to it being used as a REME workshop, Hirst discovered that much of the machinery had survived the bombing. Debris covering parts of the factory, including the generator plant, had been put there to disguise the fact that it was still operational. Hirst also found other machinery and stock, including a pre-war prototype Volkswagen, in outbuildings at the site. He realised that the factory could be used for producing new vehicles for the British occupation forces in Germany.

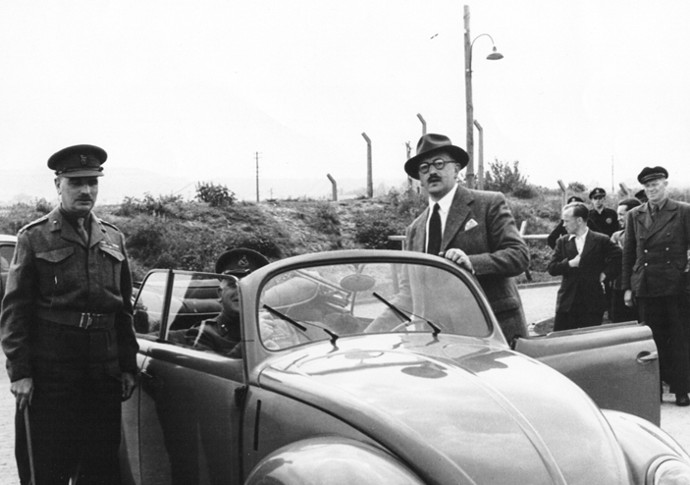
Hirst (left) in 1946, as a major with the British Army Royal Electrical and Mechanical Engineers (REME) and a new Volkswagen, built at the Wolfsburg factory

Cars were put together with old stock, including components from the military Kübelwagen until 1946, when the factory produced about 1,000 cars a month.

Hirst became interested in another Volkswagen military vehicle, the four-wheel drive Kommandeurswagen ('commander's wagon'), which he was confident had commercial potential – in particular, in the forestry industries of France and Canada. He also admired the proven versatility of the basic Volkswagen chassis, as demonstrated by Ambi Budd, Karmann and other coachworks.

His final substantive rank in the British Army was major.

== Post-war specials ==
Two of the most significant custom cars developed by Volkswagen while under the control of the British were the Radclyffe Roadster, and a four-seater convertible, both custom-built by Rudolph Ringel. The Radclyffe was a two-seater roadster that was the transport of Colonel Charles Radclyffe over the summer months of 1946. The four-seater convertible was Ivan Hirst's personal transport.

Karmann was asked to build a four-seater, and coach-builder Hebmüller was asked to make a two-seater roadster. Its design was not unlike the Radclyffe Roadster, with a similar hood and side windows. The rear engine cover, however, was a hand-formed panel, not a converted front bonnet as was the Radclyffe version.

== REME ==
The Corps of Royal Electrical and Mechanical Engineers (REME), to which Hirst belonged, has a relationship with Volkswagen which began in 1945 with a REME detachment using the factory to repair captured enemy vehicles and later to overhaul Willys MB and other British Army vehicle engines. Hirst, the Control Commission for Germany's British Senior Resident Officer, arrived at the Volkswagen factory in August of that year.

From 1946 the Volkswagen factory focus was on repairing and reconditioning Volkswagens and became known as No 2 REME Auxiliary Workshop. As the company's prospects improved, the unit became essentially civilian-run but directed by the army. The REME link ended when, on 6 September 1949, ownership transferred to the West German government. Since then Volkswagen has recognised the role that Ivan Hirst and the REME played in its rise from the ashes of the Second World War. A close bond exists between Volkswagen and REME to this day.

== Memories ==
Hirst had strong memories of his time at Wolfsburg which he would share with local Volkswagen enthusiasts. The one strongest memory he would refer to regularly was the smell of the fish glue used to fix the cardboard headlinings in early cars. In later life, he became somewhat more reticent about his involvement, often saying that it was only by chance that he had been involved and that if he had not done it someone else would have.

In January 1948, Hirst and Colonel Radclyffe were instrumental in assigning the former Opel production manager Heinrich Nordhoff as the managing director of Volkswagen, who served the group for 20 years until his death in 1968, building up the plant into one of the world's leading car manufacturers. The Volkswagen trademark was registered with the German Patent Office in Munich in October in the same year.

Being a keen amateur photographer, his home was littered with images taken in the early days at Volkswagen, including one really early picture of a prototype coupe which was very similar to the Volkswagen Type 14A (Hebmüller Cabriolet) cars of the early 1950s.

== Presentation of the model cars ==
Hirst once showed a friend a scale model of a Volkswagen Beetle that Volkswagen had presented to him. The 1:10 scale model, now on display in the REME Museum, was one of three made by Koch in Cologne. The second model was given to Colonel Charles Radclyffe; the third was presented to Heinrich Nordhoff, whom the British occupying authorities appointed managing director of Volkswagen in early 1948.

== Later life ==
Hirst later joined the industry staff of the German section of the Foreign Office, where he stayed until 1955 when he joined the Organisation for European Economic Co-operation (OEEC) (before it became the Organisation for Economic Co-operation and Development (OECD) in 1961) in Paris until his retirement in 1975. He died on 10 March 2000 (aged 84). Just one month earlier, he had appeared in an edition of the British Top Gear magazine, which revealed the story of how Major Hirst revived the Volkswagen car plant. He was also photographed driving a new front wheel-drive, front-engined Beetle in the magazine.

Hirst married Marjorie Pilkington on 28 March 1940. They remained married until her death in 1992. They had no children.

== Honours ==
- A road in Wolfsburg, not far from Volkswagen's factory buildings, is named Major-Hirst-Straße (lit. 'Major-Hirst-Road') in his honour.

== Sources ==
- Richter, Ralf (2003). Ivan Hirst – British Officer and Manager of Volkswagen's Postwar Recovery (PDF). Historical Notes, Volume 4, A series of publications from the Volkswagen AG Corporate History Wolfsburg. Wolfsburg: Volkswagen AG. ISBN 3-935112-13-0. ISSN 1615-1593. Archived (PDF) from the original on 27 September 2007.
- Patton, Phil (22 March 2000). "Maj. Ivan Hirst, Who Saved Volkswagen, Is Dead at 84". The New York Times. Archived from the original on 26 August 2000.
- Clausager, Anders Ditlev (18 March 2000). "Ivan Hirst - Englishman who made Volkswagen part of the German economic miracle". The Guardian.
