= Thomas Schäfer (diplomat) =

German diplomat

Thomas Schäfer (born December 1, 1952, in Oldenburg) is a retired German diplomat. He was German ambassador to North Korea from 2007 to 2010 and from 2013 to 2018. He voluntarily served the second term, as he is personally fascinated by the country. He was described as one of the most experienced Western diplomats in Pyongyang by Handelsblatt. Schäfer is the author of From Kim Jong Il to Kim Jong Un: How the Hardliners Prevailed: On the Political History of North Korea (2007 - 2020). He received his PhD in German History from the University of Kiel in 1985. His first posting after studying history took him to Beijing in the 1980s. The fact that he gained an insight into the Chinese bureaucracy there helped him to understand North Korea. Since then, he has commuted between Latin America and Asia, holding posts in El Salvador, Hong Kong and Venezuela. Before heading back to North Korea, Schäfer became German ambassador to Guatemala, his wife's home country, in 2010.
