= Thomas Schäfer (manager) =

German manager, Chief Executive Officer of Volkswagen Passenger Cars

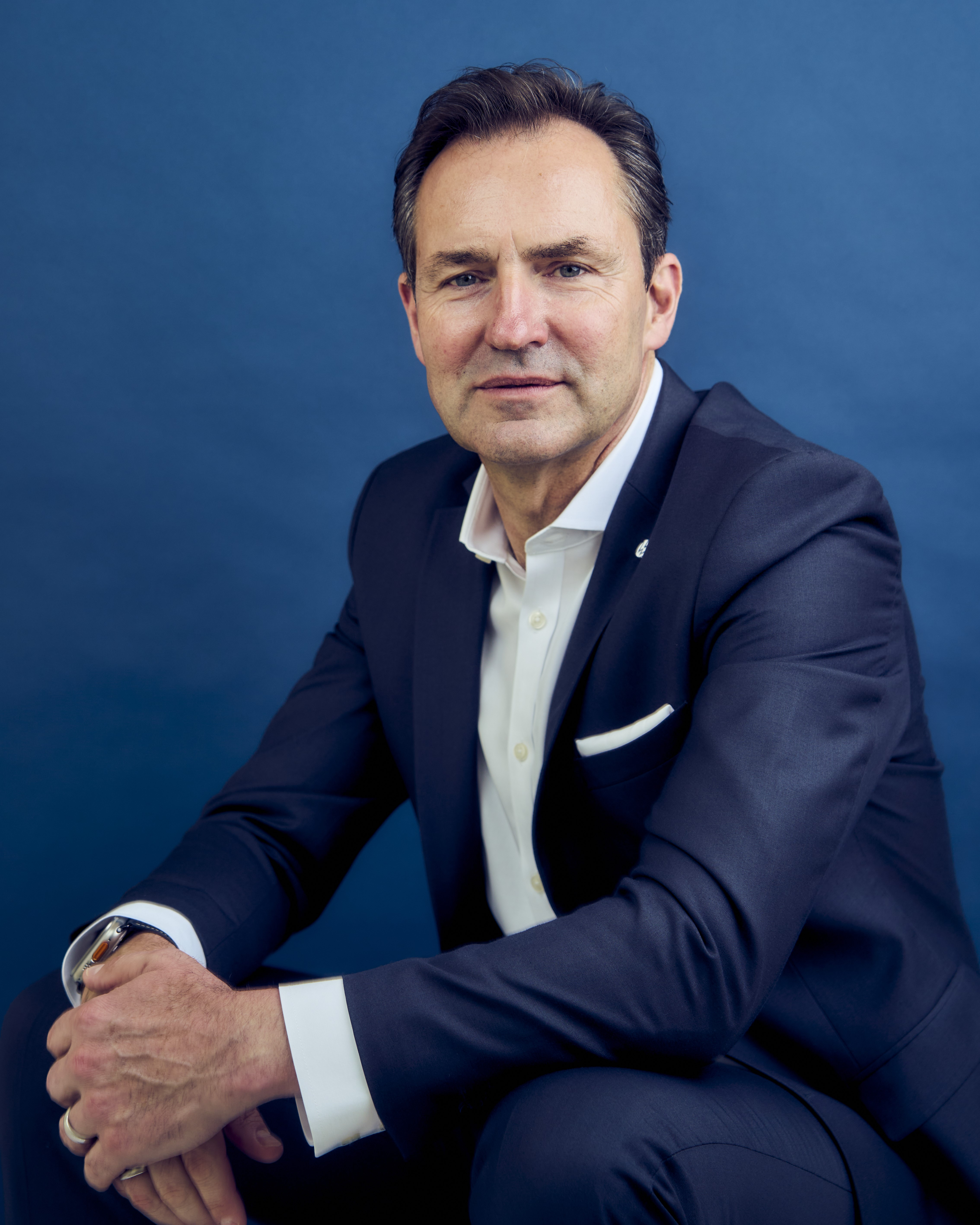
- Thomas Schäfer, 2024
- Born: 1 April 1970 (age 54); Marburg, Germany
- Education: Mechanical engineering; Production technology
- Alma mater: Baden-Württemberg Cooperative State University
- Occupation: CEO of Volkswagen Passenger Cars
- Years active: 1991–present
- Organization: Volkswagen Group
- Board member of: Member of the Board of Management, Volkswagen Group; Chairman of the Supervisory Board, Škoda Auto; Chairman of the Supervisory Board, SEAT/Cupra; Member of the Advisory Board, Volkswagen Commercial Vehicles

Thomas Schäfer (German: [ˈtoːmas ˈʃɛːfɐ]; born 1 April 1970) is a German manager. Since July 2022, he has been chief executive officer (CEO) of Volkswagen Passenger Cars (VW) and a board member of the Volkswagen Group. Schäfer is responsible for all volume brands. This includes Škoda Auto, which he managed from 2020 to 2022. Before that, Schäfer worked for Daimler and Mercedes-Benz.

== Early life and education ==
Schäfer was born on 1 April 1970 in Marburg. He spent his childhood in Hesse. After graduating from Freiherr vom Stein School Gladenbach, he studied mechanical engineering and production technology at the Baden-Württemberg Cooperative State University in Mannheim from 1991 to 1994.

== Career ==
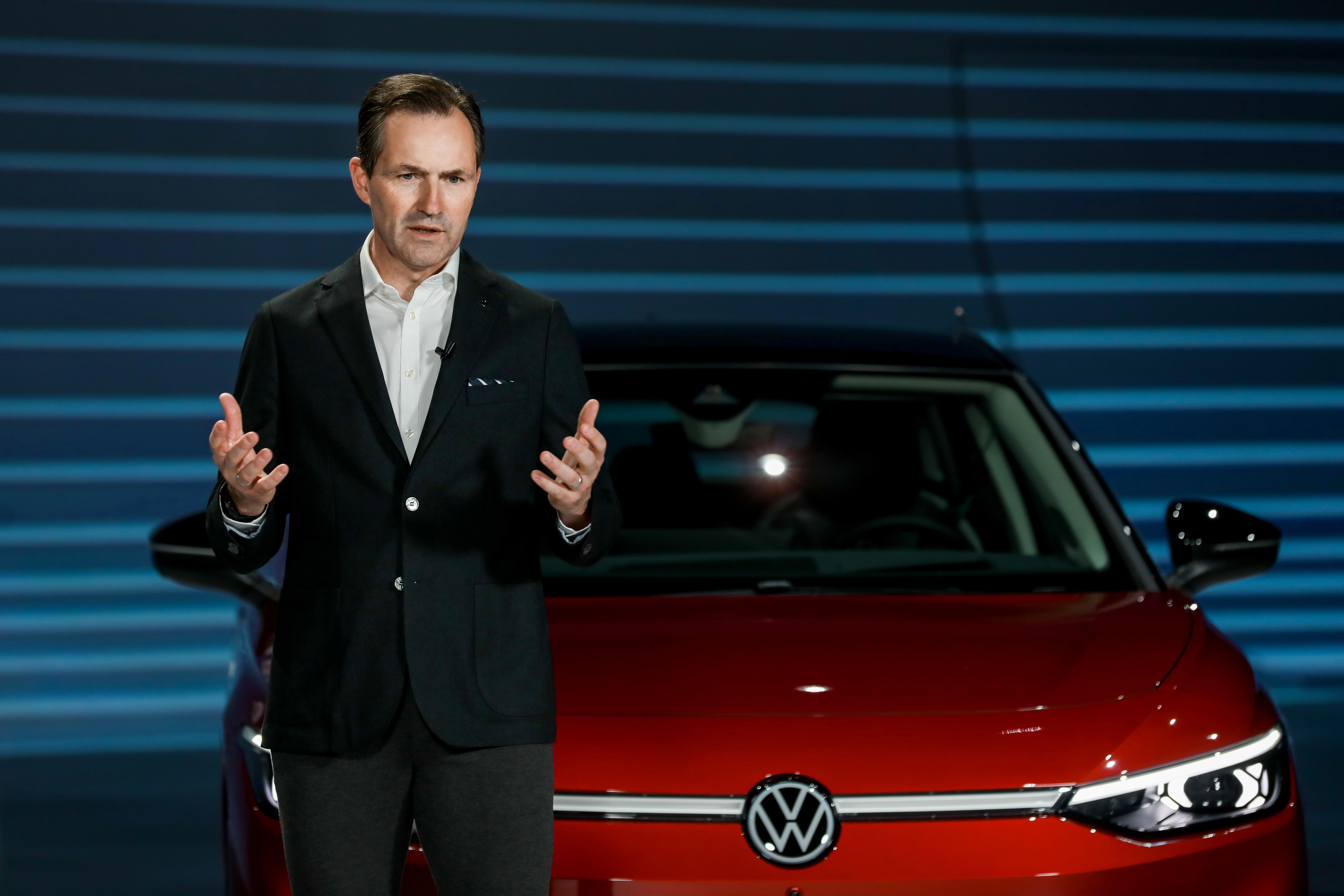
Schäfer with the VW ID.7

=== Daimler ===
Schäfer began his career at Daimler AG in 1991. After completing his studies, he worked in the quality assurance department. After spending time in Germany and the United States, he supported Mercedes-Benz production in South Africa and has been Vice President of Mercedes-Benz Malaysia.

In 2005, Schäfer returned to Sindelfingen. His responsibilities included vehicle deliveries and the Mercedes-Benz customer center at Daimler's corporate headquarters. Besides, Schäfer was responsible for managing emerging markets production.

=== Volkswagen ===
In 2012, Schäfer moved to Volkswagen AG in Wolfsburg. He was initially responsible for production processes at various international locations. In 2015, he became Chairman and Managing Director of Volkswagen Group South Africa, where he also held responsibility for the sub-Saharan region.

Schäfer's appointment as CEO of Škoda Auto in August 2020 attracted attention. Under his leadership, the brand updated its strategy until 2030, with a focus on more affordable models for the mass market. He also pushed ahead with the electrification of the model range. One example is the successful production and sales launch of the Škoda Enyaq. In addition to the traditional markets, India and Africa have been identified as growth regions for Škoda.

In 2022, Schäfer moved to Volkswagen passenger cars. After joining the Board of Management as Chief Operating Officer (COO), he was appointed CEO of the brand in July 2022. At the same time, he was promoted to the Board of Management of the Volkswagen Group. There he is responsible for the Brand Group Core, the organizational merger of the group's volume brands. Schäfer is chairman of the supervisory boards of Škoda and SEAT/Cupra and heads the advisory board of Volkswagen's commercial vehicles division.

Schäfer drove the development of smaller electric cars at Volkswagen, including the VW ID.2. At the same time, successful models with combustion engines were continued, such as the VW Tiguan and VW Passat. In order to secure future investments in the transformation of the company, he aims to achieve a 6.5% return on sales by 2026, with an emphasis on reducing costs, streamlining operations, and increasing efficiency in development and production.

== Other activities ==
In October 2023, Schäfer took over the role of Chairman of the Sub-Saharan Africa Initiative of German Business. His goal is to expand the activities of German business on the African continent.
