= Matthias Müller (businessman) =

German businessman (born 1953)

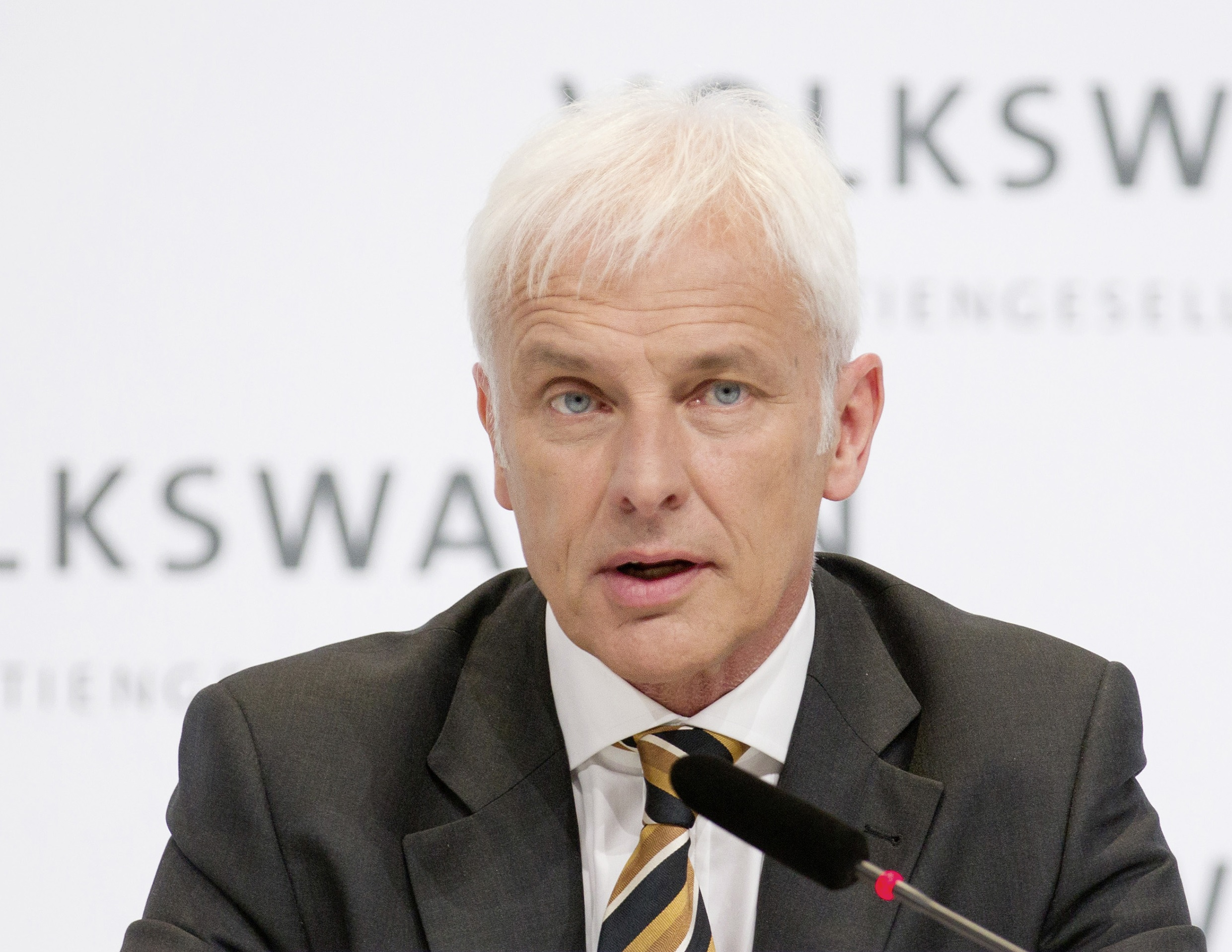
- Matthias Müller in 2015
- Born: 9 June 1953 (age 73); Limbach-Oberfrohna, East Germany
- Education: Munich University of Applied Sciences
- Occupations: Former CEO, Volkswagen AG

Matthias Müller (born 9 June 1953) is a German businessman who served as the chief executive officer (CEO) of Volkswagen AG from 25 September 2015 to 12 April 2018. He had been the CEO of its subsidiary, Porsche, since 2010 and has been a Member of the executive board of Porsche Automobil Holding SE since 2010.

== Early life and education ==
Matthias Müller was born on 9 June 1953, in Limbach-Oberfrohna, East Germany. His family moved to West Germany in 1955, and he grew up in Bavaria. After graduating from school in Ingolstadt, Müller started an apprenticeship as a toolmaker at Audi, which he completed in 1977. He subsequently studied computer engineering science at the Munich University of Applied Sciences.

== Career ==
Müller returned to Audi and assumed a junior management position in the IT department in 1984. After joining the planning department in 1993, Müller became product manager for the Audi A3; two years later he was given overall responsibility for product management at Audi.

Following Martin Winterkorn assumption of management at Audi, Müller was appointed coordinator of the Audi and Lamborghini model lines in 2002. In 2007 Winterkorn became boss of the VW Group and appointed Müller as general representative, later making him head of VW's product strategy, in control of all group brands.

In October 2010, he was appointed the CEO of Porsche AG. In February 2014 he became chief information officer of Porsche Automobil Holding SE.

On 25 September 2015, he was appointed the CEO of Volkswagen AG. He was ousted of his position as CEO of Volkswagen on April 12, 2018. Dr. Herbert Diess assumed Müller's position as CEO of Volkswagen AG.
