= Herbert Diess =

Austrian businessman

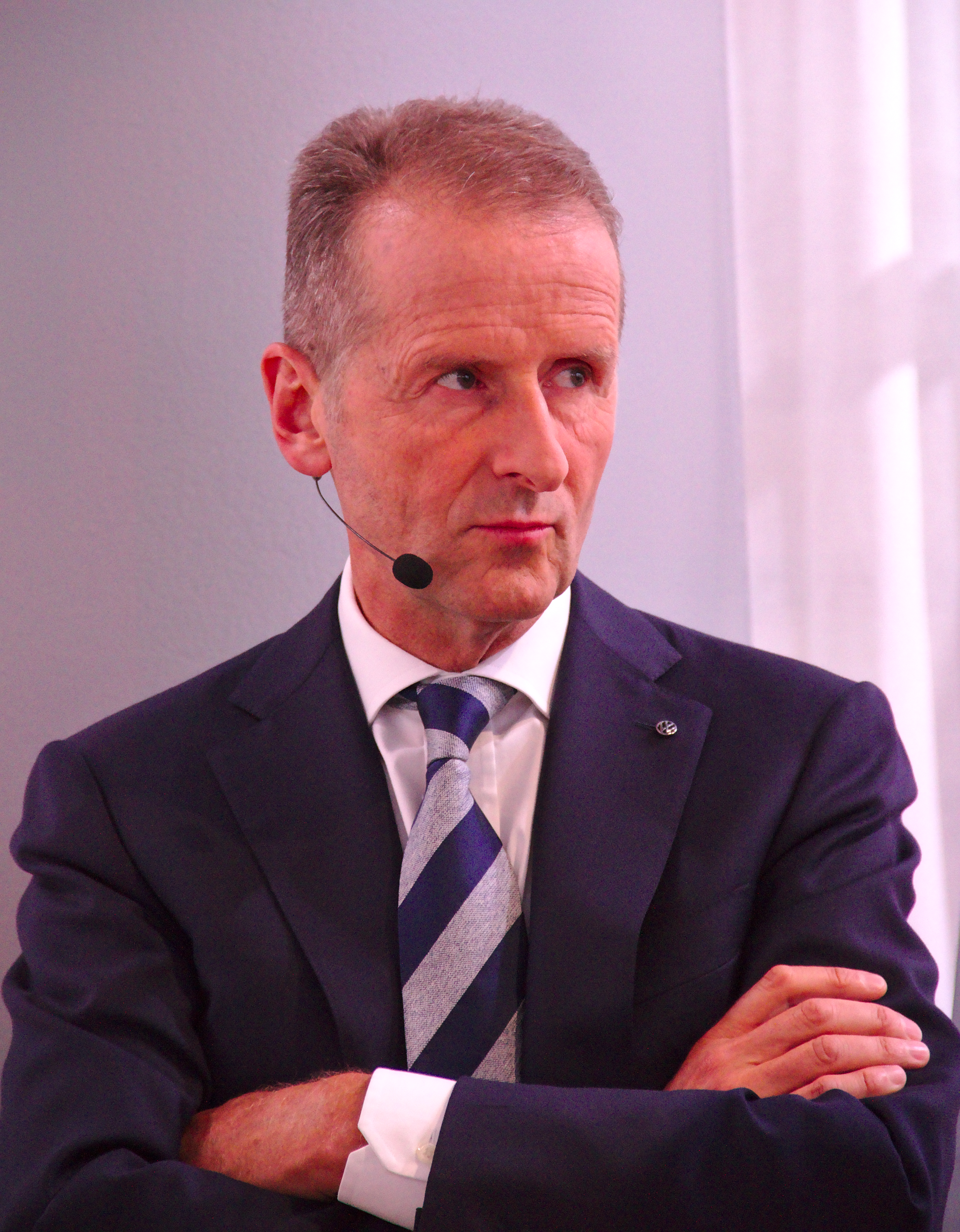
- Diess in 2019
- Born: 24 October 1958 (age 67); Munich, West Germany
- Education: Munich University of Applied Sciences (1977–1978); Technical University of Munich (1978–1983)
- Occupations: Chairman of Management Board, CEO, Chairman of Volkswagen Brand Board of Management
- Employer: Volkswagen Group
- Board member of: Audi AG, Volkswagen AG, SEAT S.A., Škoda Auto, Porsche Holding GmbH, others

Herbert Diess (born 24 October 1958) is an Austrian businessman, the former (2018-2022) chairman of the board of management of Volkswagen Group, he also held the position of chairman of the board of management for the Volkswagen Passenger Cars brand.

== Career ==
=== BMW ===
In 1996, Diess joined BMW. He worked a variety of jobs there, and was widely seen as responsible for the BMW i3 and BMW i8. He left BMW to take on a role at Volkswagen in 2015.

=== Volkswagen ===
In 2019, Herbert Diess told VW employees at a work event "EBIT macht frei", a play on the words “Arbeit macht frei” (Work makes you free) which was the slogan over the entrance to Auschwitz and other concentration camps. During the Russian invasion of Ukraine in 2022, Herbert Diess called for Brussels (the EU) to push for a peace deal with Russia so that trade could resume and the EU's commercial interests would be protected.

In July 2022, following discontent from labor representatives, Volkswagen announced that Diess had resigned as CEO and would leave the company by the end of August. He was replaced by Oliver Blume.

=== The Mobility House ===
In January 2024, Diess joined The Mobility House, an electromobility company, as the Executive Chairman of the Board.

== Diesel Emissions Scandal ==
As the CEO of Volkswagen Group, Herbert Diess was prosecuted, along with Hans Dieter Pötsch, the chairman of the supervisory board of Volkswagen, on September 24, 2019, for the manipulation of Volkswagen's diesel emissions.

Executives were charged with withholding information from shareholders about the huge financial implications due to the scandal, which gained much media attention. German law requires top executives to inform shareholders about significant financial risks and issues. This follows after the investigation finding that Volkswagen's rigged millions of diesel cars worldwide to cheat on emissions tests, which led the company to lose over $30 billion. As a result of the spurious information, the stocks plummeted almost 40 per cent. However Volkswagen defended themselves: "The company has meticulously investigated this matter with the help of internal and external legal experts for almost four years ... the result is clear: the allegations are groundless."

Legal proceedings against Diess and Pötsch ended in 2020 after VW agreed to pay a fine of €9 million.
