= Toni Schmücker =

German businessman (1921–1996)

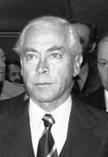
- Born: 23 April 1921; Frechen, North Rhine-Westphalia, Germany
- Died: 6 November 1996 (aged 75); Bergisch Gladbach, North Rhine-Westphalia, Germany
- Known for: Volkswagen

Toni Schmücker (23 April 1921 in Frechen – 6 November 1996 in Bergisch Gladbach) was the fourth chief executive officer of the Volkswagen automobile company (Volkswagenwerk AG), following the handover of the company in 1948 to German control from the British, who had administered the VW factory in Wolfsburg, Germany after the Second World War ended.

Schmücker's automotive experience came from a long successful career with Ford at Cologne where he began his career as a commercial apprentice when aged 16. He returned to Ford in 1946, following his military service, working successively in the sales, finance and export departments. He was appointed Purchasing Manager in 1956 and joined the management board in 1961. He was appointed Sales manager in 1967 before leaving to become Chairman of Rheinstahl in 1968.

He became Chairman of the Volkswagen board in February 1975, succeeding Rudolf Leiding. Schmücker brought to the job a combination of political skill and personal charm that had eluded his two immediate predecessors: his authority within the company was also enhanced by the extent of the financial crisis that directly preceded his appointment and which had appeared to place the very survival of the business in doubt. At the time of Schmücker's assumption of the job, Volkswagen had just staved off bankruptcy with the introduction of the Volkswagen Golf (marketed as the Rabbit in North America and as the Caribe in Latin America), which would eventually replace the Volkswagen Beetle. One of Schmücker's first achievements at Wolfsburg involved reducing the Volkswagen workforce by 25,000 employees during 1975, applying, in the words of a contemporary industry commentator, methods and systems he had learned at Ford. The loss making assembly plant in Australia was closed, but after a period of rationalisation he placed the plants in Mexico and Brazil on a sounder footing for growth than that on which he had found them.

Schmücker's cost-cutting instincts were also evident in the decision to sell back to Porsche the commission for a successor to the commercially disappointing VW-Porsche 914. The new car, based on the underpinnings of the Audi 100 C2, turned up a couple of years later badged as the Porsche 924, but sold in much lower volumes (and at a near Porsche-level higher price) than had been envisaged when Volkswagen had commissioned the project.

In September 1976, Schmücker made history by securing a deal to build the Volkswagen Westmoreland Assembly Plant near New Stanton, Pennsylvania, making VW the first non-American car company to build its products in the United States since the 1930s. It was an effort to make the Rabbit less expensive to sell in North America at a time when the German Mark was gaining in value both against the U.S. dollar and against the currencies of other competitor economies such as Italy, Japan and France. The Pennsylvania factory opened on 10 April 1978.

The Schmücker era saw a conscious retreat from the old commitment to crank up volumes at almost any price: Volkswagen by 1980 was only the world's fifth largest auto-maker in terms of unit sales, overtaken during the 1970s by Toyota and Nissan since volumes had peaked in 1971. Under Schmücker, the Beetle was no longer the unstoppable force in European and US marketplaces it had been at the start of the decade, and in price sensitive markets the German built Golf was hampered by government determination to retain a strong currency. VW lost sales volume to the Japanese automakers, generally around the world but particularly in North America. Nevertheless, in 1975 Volkswagen was again profitable and in 1976 it posted a profit of One Billion Marks, earning Schmücker the epithet in Wolfsburg "Toni, der Trickser".

After suffering a heart attack in 1981, Schmücker was forced to resign the following year, and was succeeded by Dr. Carl Hahn.
