= Kurt Lotz =

- Born: 18 September 1912; Lenderscheid (Frielendorf), Hessen
- Died: 9 March 2005 (aged 92); Hanover
- Known for: Volkswagen

Dr. Kurt Lotz (18 September 1912 – 9 March 2005) was the second post-war Chief executive officer (CEO) of the Volkswagen automobile company in Germany. He was nominated in April 1967 to succeed Heinrich Nordhoff at the end of December 1968. Nordhoff died in April 1968.

Lotz was the son of a farmer from the German state of Hesse. During World War II, he became a Luftwaffe general-staff Major, assigned to assessing needs for the military, which Lotz later looked back on as his first experience with industrial planning on a major scale.

After the war, Lotz worked as a clerk in Mannheim with the German subsidiary of the Swiss electrical company Brown, Boveri & Cie, which makes a range of electrical equipment, from home appliances to locomotives. Within twelve years, Lotz rose to chairman. He attempted to diversify the firm, by investing in a small computer company to compete with American computer companies, but when it lost money, a rift between Lotz and his Swiss superiors ensued, and he left. By the time he agreed to become Nordhoff's successor at Volkswagen, he was thought of as a wunderkind of German industry for his rapid rise to the top.

Lotz had been scheduled to take over as VW chairman in October 1968, when Nordhoff was to retire; instead, Nordhoff died six months earlier, and Lotz immediately took over then. He made it VW's priority to wean itself off production of its exceedingly popular Beetle when that model began to look dated in comparison to newer small cars in the North American and European markets. Beetle sales actually peaked in the United States the same year Lotz took over. In addition to that, a serious recession in West Germany the previous year, coupled with serious competition at home from Opel and from Ford's newly merged British and German operations, weakened the Beetle's dominance.

Lotz bought out the small German carmaker NSU. Work began on a new small car in 1969, a prototype of which was exhibited for the European auto press.

At a time when Germany was swinging decisively towards SPD politics, Lotz as a CDU man found himself increasingly out of tune with the political mood of the time, while his position placed him at the head of a particularly political company. His relationship with the VW trades union leaders was not constructive and he failed to retain the support of the Supervisory Board. The struggle to maintain management control of the business left him with insufficient time to drive through resolution of the increasingly urgent issues involving product policy: he resigned as chairman on 13 September 1971, to be succeeded by Rudolf Leiding.

In the Autumn/Fall of 1977 Lotz published a memoir entitled "Lebenserfahrungen - Worüber man in Politik und Wirtschaft auch sprechen sollte". It was reported that those familiar with the manuscript had identified no "indiscretions" concerning his time with Volkswagen. These reports were accompanied by speculation that his substantial retirement settlement of a monthly DM 16,000 pension would render any printed indiscretion superfluous.

In 1981 Lotz became Chairman of the World Wildlife Fund in Germany. By 2002 he was honorary president of the German branch of the organisation.

When Lotz died in 2005, Ferdinand Piech, chairman of VW from 1993 to 2002, eulogized him as "a strong entrepreneurial personality" who "set his mind thoroughly on steering Volkswagen into the future."

Lotz received an honorary doctorate from the University of Mannheim in 1962.

== Notes ==
- TIME magazine, April 14, 1967
