= Rudolf Leiding =

German businessman (1914–2003)

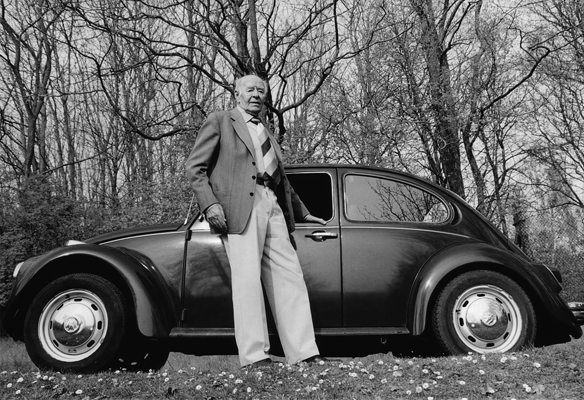
- Born: 4 September 1914; Iden, Saxony-Anhalt, Germany
- Died: 3 September 2003 (aged 88); Baunatal, Hesse, Germany
- Known for: Volkswagen Golf

Rudolf Leiding (4 September 1914 – 3 September 2003) was the third post-war chairman of the Volkswagen automobile company (Volkswagenwerk AG), succeeding Kurt Lotz in 1971.

== Career ==
Leiding began his career with Volkswagen at Wolfsburg in 1945 where he was responsible for the repair of army vehicles. Heinrich Nordhoff then charged him with setting up the first postwar Wolfsburg assembly line, using such parts as he could find. Leiding's ingenuity at this task led to promotion, and Leiding found himself sent to the United States to organize the first VW service network there. Between 1958 and 1965, he was the first director of the VW works in Kassel. Subsequently, he transferred to Auto Union GmbH in Ingolstadt where he became chairman of the board, presiding during the company's development of the successful Audi 100.

Leiding arrived at the top Volkswagen job with a reputation as a successful trouble-shooter. When Volkswagen under Nordoff acquired Auto Union/Audi, Leiding was sent to "sort out" morale and discipline, as general manager at the Ingolstadt plant. During his first week he took to standing at the plant entrance each day at 7 am in order to check on late arrivals for the morning shift, a technique he subsequently employed at other plants. Finding a compound filled with 28,000 unsold, unused and increasingly obsolete cars, he sent office staff onto the street to "get rid of them at any cost". Many friends and relations of Ingolstadt-based Audi employees acquired bargain unused cars as a result of the exercise. Demand for the Ingolstadt plant's output did not justify a night shift at this time, and Leiding took to walking through the plant at night in the company of a photographer. The next day departmental heads responsible for areas where examples of inefficiency or waste had been identified would receive photographs of the deficient work stations, with no comment beyond the signature of the general manager. It was reported that during his first year at Ingolstadt Leiding reduced production costs by 34%.

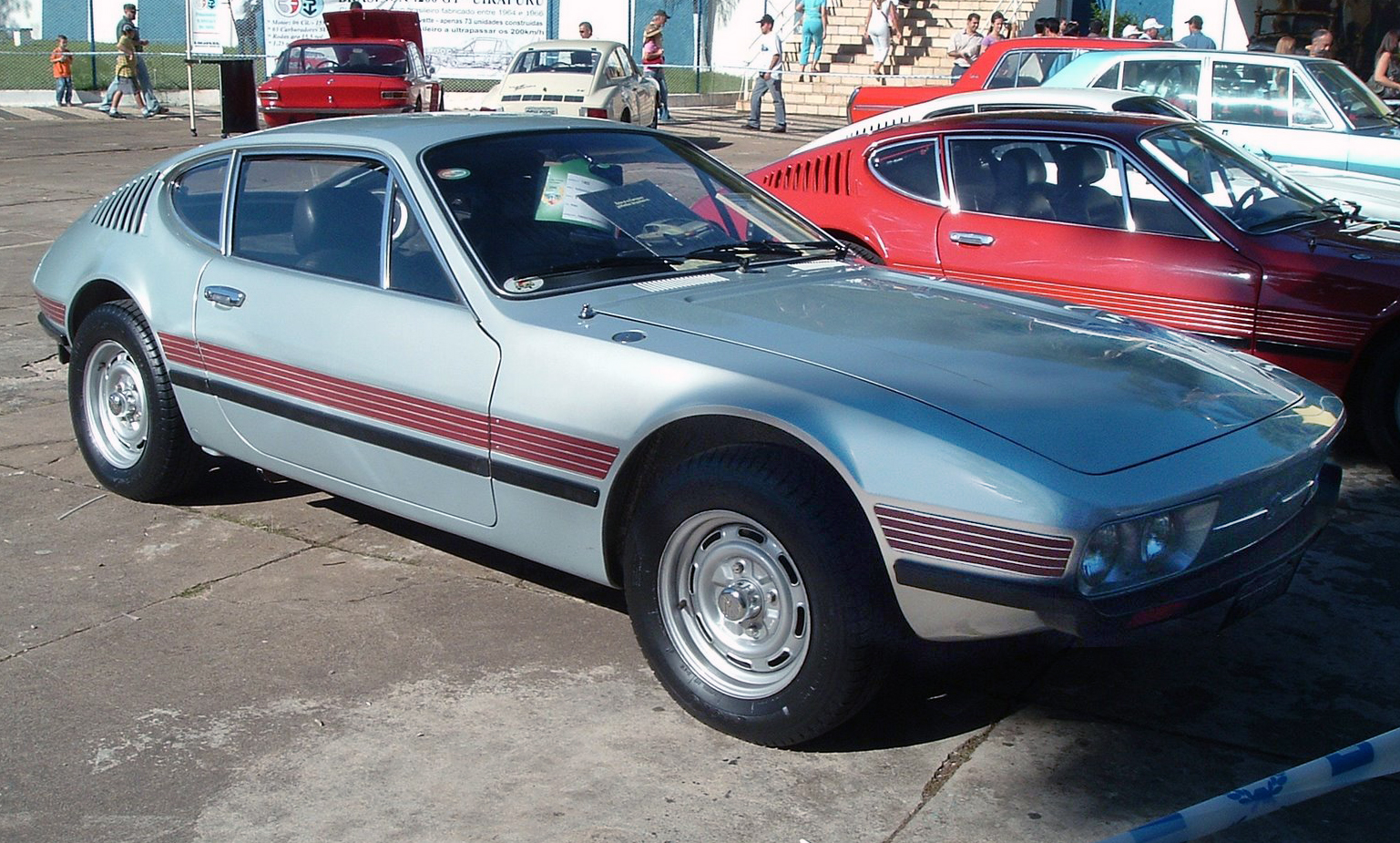
During his time in charge of Volkswagen's São Paulo based operations Leiding oversaw the development of the Volkswagen SP2.

In July 1968, Leiding left Ingolstadt to take on the chairmanship of Volkswagen of Brazil. His time in São Paulo saw the development of the Volkswagen SP2 to be launched in 1972, one year after he went back to Germany to assume his position as VW CEO. Over the space of three years from 1968 to 1971 he also achieved, a 50% increase in Volkswagen's Brazilian production.

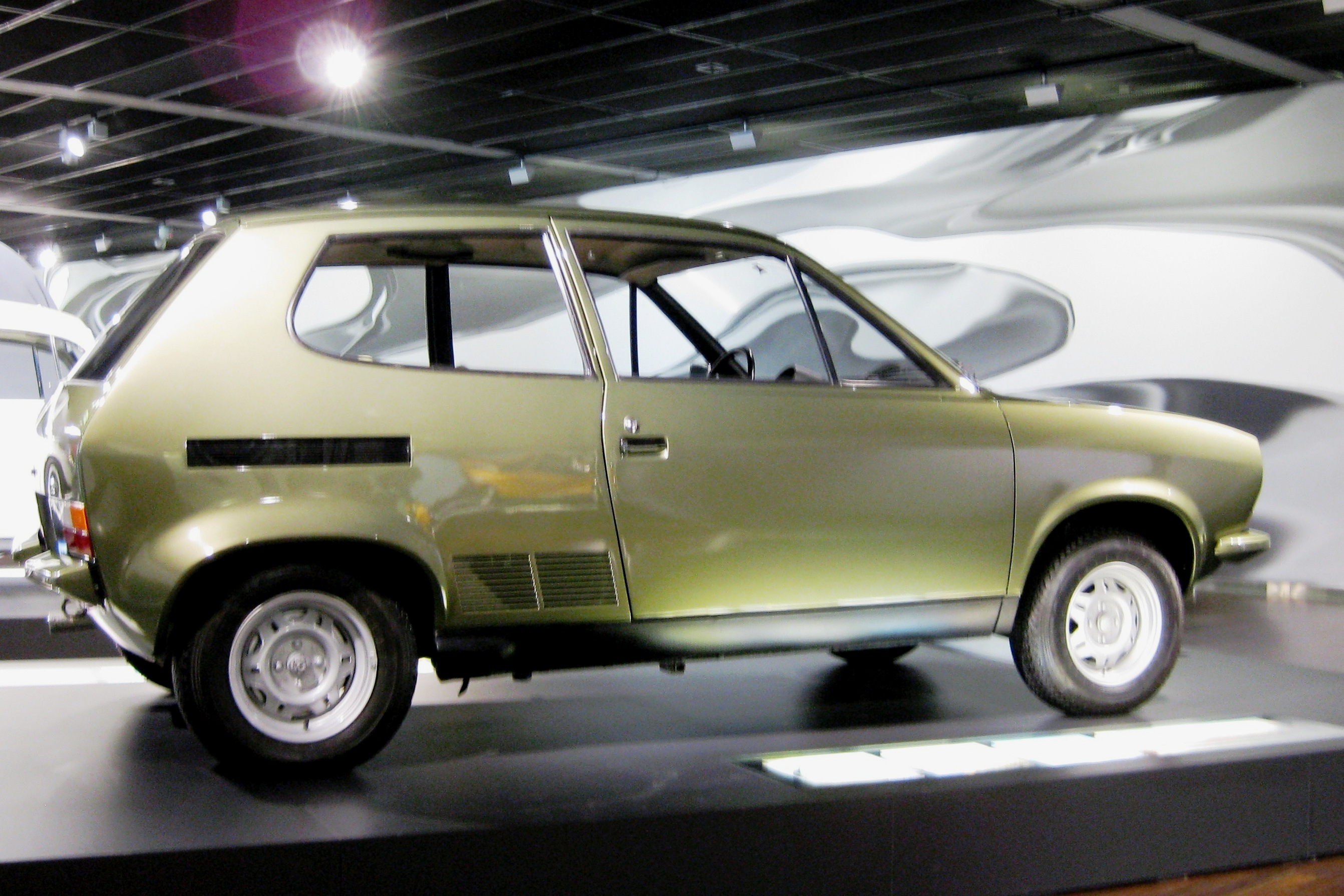
One of Leiding's first actions on assuming the top job at Wolfsburg was the cancellation of Development Project 266, a near launch-ready mid-engined air-cooled model intended to replace the Beetle, and pictured here. Despite the lukewarm reception of Volkswagen retailers and service outlets to the recently introduced front-engined water-cooled Volkswagen K70, Leiding instead bet the company's future on the Fiat-inspired FWD configuration, using the Audi 80 project as a template for the successful Polo/Golf/Passat ranges.

Less than three weeks after taking over from Lotz at Wolfsburg, Leiding halted work on EA266 (Development Project 266). This was the development of a sophisticated mid-engined successor to the Beetle being developed by a Porsche team under a young engineer named Piëch on Volkswagen's behalf. The move was hugely contentious at the time partly because the Beetle replacement project was well advanced: 16 Million Marks had already been invested in EA266. It was culturally contentious because it hinted at a rejection of the company's historical roots. Given the market's lukewarm reception to newer rear-engined air-cooled models such as the Volkswagen 411, Leiding's decision to use Audi products then in the pipe-line as a short-cut for Volkswagen to follow Europe's pace-setter manufacturers such as, above all, Fiat down the water-cooled front-engined front-wheel drive route makes perfect sense in the light of subsequent events. But contemporaries lacked the foresight necessary for that judgement.

The extent of Volkswagen's problems was highlighted during the first four months of 1972 when the company's domestic sales of 151,086 were comfortably beaten by Opel, who sold 161,127 cars in West Germany in those months. In May of the same year Leiding was ready to go public with his rescue strategy, by now already moving towards implementation. He pointed out that the Volkswagen group was producing eight disparate "volume" models, including five that had been launched within the last five years as part of an urgent if unfocused attempt to reduce Volkswagen's dependence on the aging Beetle. In terms of components and production technology the group's newer models had virtually nothing in common with one another. The 1500/1600 introduced back in 1961 sold in respectable numbers, but volumes had never approached the levels necessary for a Beetle successor. Of the five more recent launches, four, the NSU Ro 80, the VW-Porsche 914, the 411/412 and the K70 were selling at levels that came nowhere close to justifying the levels of spending that had backed their development and launch, the 411 and K70 both having been intended as Opel Rekord rivals that could sell at the levels needed to provide an acceptable return on the necessary investment in production capacity and infrastructure at the company's new Salzgitter plant.

Leiding described the key to his solution as the "Baukastensystem" (roughly translated as "modular assembly") whereby an entire palette of cars could be designed, ranging from a rival for the super-mini class defining Fiat 127 right up to a full-size family car, all of them sharing the same essential design architecture and most of their components. This would minimise the necessary investment in tooling and training while maximising the flexibility with which production could be switched between models in response to unexpected marketplace changes. Leiding came to the challenge of turning round Volkswagen with experience and a good engineer's instinct for production engineering: what he now set out was no more than an extension of the strategy already implemented when in 1965 he had been sent by Heinrich Nordhoff, then the Volkswagen chief, to "sort out" the group's new acquisition at Ingolstadt.

Essential to the plan was close integration of product and production planning. Volkswagen's development chief, Werner Holste, having recently left the company, Leiding announced that as chairman he would now himself take direct responsibility for development of the company's new product range, supported by a new position for the Production Director at Audi, Ludwig Kraus, the man who recently had secretly, and in direct contravention of instructions from Volkswagen's first autocratic chairman, developed to production readiness the Audi 100, a car which stood apart from the group's other new models of recent years because it was a success from both the engineering and the marketing perspectives. In 1973 the European auto-industry stood on the brink of an economic crisis that would prove more challenging than anything experienced for more than two decades. Ludwig Kraus himself was already 62 years old and now faded from prominence, but Leiding's plan for Volkswagen nevertheless unfolded very much as he had laid out to the press in the early summer of 1973.

Even two years later, with the Beetle continuing to lose favour in the market place, Leiding enjoyed the doubtful privilege of presiding over Volkswagen's record 1974 loss of DM 800 million. Nevertheless, 1974 was a critical year for another reason: it was the year in which Golfs started emerging for the Wolfsburg plant, and Leiding's successor reaped the reward of a DM 1,000 Million profit two years later in 1976.

Under Leiding's leadership, the Volkswagen Golf was completed, and went on sale in Europe in June 1974, introduced in North America as the Rabbit seven months later. The Golf was credited with saving VW from possible bankruptcy after the company had relied on the Beetle too long.

Rudolf Leiding left the company early in 1975 and was replaced by Toni Schmücker.

He died on 3 September 2003, one day before his 89th birthday.
