= Heinrich Nordhoff =

German engineer who led the rebuilding of Volkswagen (VW) after World War II

- Born: Heinz Heinrich Nordhoff; 6 January 1899; Hildesheim, German Empire
- Died: 12 April 1968 (aged 69); Wolfsburg, West Germany
- Known for: Chief of Volkswagen

Heinz Heinrich Nordhoff (6 January 1899 – 12 April 1968) was a German engineer who led the rebuilding of Volkswagen (VW) after World War II. He was featured on the cover of Time magazine on Feb. 15, 1954.

In 1948, Nordhoff accepted a British invitation to assume the directorship of VW, which had been revived as a functioning concern by the British under the direction of Ivan Hirst. Nordhoff subsequently guided the company to become the fourth largest automotive company at the time of his death in 1968.

== Background ==
Nordhoff was born in Hildesheim, the son of a banker. He graduated from the Technische Hochschule Charlottenburg, where he became a member of the Roman Catholic fraternity Askania-Burgundia.

Nordhoff died on April 12, 1968, from the effects of a heart attack sustained months earlier. He was survived by his wife, Charlotte (Fassunge) Nordhoff (1898-1988) and daughters Elisabeth (later Mrs. Ernst Piech, grandson of Ferdinand Porsche) and Barbara Nordhoff (Mrs. Dan Cantacuzino-Corneni, 1929-2022).

On his death, the Boston Globe described him as a shy, gentle man, an artist, music lover, naturalist, and hunter — who, having lived the equivalent of several years in the United States during his tenure with General Motors, spoke English like a native. At the time of his death, he lived in Wolfsburg, West Germany, the city noted for Volkswagen's then-largest production facility.

== Career ==
In 1927, Nordhoff began work for BMW working on aircraft engines.

In 1929 he went to work for Opel, where he gained experience of the automotive industry and, since the company had been acquired by General Motors not long before, of American practices in the field. He was rapidly promoted: in 1936 he was the Commercial-Technical director who presented the company's innovative new small car, the Kadett, to the public.

In 1942, with passenger car production much diminished on account of the war, he took over from Gerd Stieler von Heydekampf as Production Director at the company's flagship truck plant at Brandenburg.

After the war he was barred from working in the American-occupied sector because of a business award he had received from the Nazis. He obtained a job as a service manager at a Hamburg garage. Hamburg was a central location for the Control Commission for Germany (British Element), the administration for the British Zone of Occupation, who recruited him for the position of managing director of the REME-controlled Volkswagen plant at Wolfsburg at the urging of British Army Major Ivan Hirst, who had been directing the plant. Nordhoff took up the position on 1 January 1948.

During his first year in post, Nordhoff doubled production to 19,244 cars. By the end of 1961 annual production exceeded a million vehicles. He became legendary for turning the Volkswagen Beetle into a worldwide automotive phenomenon; he developed export markets and ultimately manufacturing facilities abroad. He pioneered the idea of constant improvement while keeping the styling the same. He gave liberal benefits to Volkswagen workers and increased pay scales. Within six years of taking over Volkswagen, Nordhoff reduced the number of man-hours to produce a single car by 75 percent, from 400 to 100. His commitment to improving the workmanship at Volkswagen made the Beetle famous for its bulletproof reliability.

In 1955, shortly before the Wolfsburg factory celebrated its millionth Volkswagen, Nordhoff was awarded a Federal Service Cross with star.

Nordhoff's ability to sell cars and his achievement in first placing the Wolfsburg factory on a firm footing and then making Volkswagen a domestic and international success have not been questioned, but he has been criticised on various bases. At Brandenburg during the war, he used slave labour, although he reportedly ensured the workers had adequate food, shelter and clothing. He took full credit for the company's successes and has been seen as overly self-promoting; in the 1950s he was nicknamed "King Nordhoff" by the West German press. Finally, as became apparent in the 1960s, Volkswagen was too slow and inefficient in developing new designs under him. While publicly championing the Beetle, beginning in 1952 Nordhoff spent DM200 million behind the scenes seeking to develop new models, some in partnership with other manufacturers, but his indecision led to the abandonment of all such prototypes. By the late 1960s, the Beetle faced serious competition from Japanese, American, and other European models in different markets. Ultimately, Nordhoff's takeover of Auto Union in 1964 to provide still more manufacturing capacity for Beetles ended up both providing the group with both what would become its performance-luxury brand - Audi - and also the expertise to finally replace the Beetle and its tail-engined stablemates.

Nordhoff had wanted Carl Hahn, head of Volkswagen of America, to succeed him on his retirement, but the Board of Directors chose Kurt Lotz. Nordhoff had a heart attack in summer 1967, and although he returned to work in October, he died six months later, in April 1968; he was to have retired that autumn.

== Quote ==
"Offering people an honest value appealed to me more than being driven around by a bunch of hysterical stylists trying to sell people something they really don't want to have." — Heinrich Nordhoff on his automotive philosophy, from the book Volkswagen: Beetles, Buses and Beyond by James Flammang.
