= SEAT 1500 =

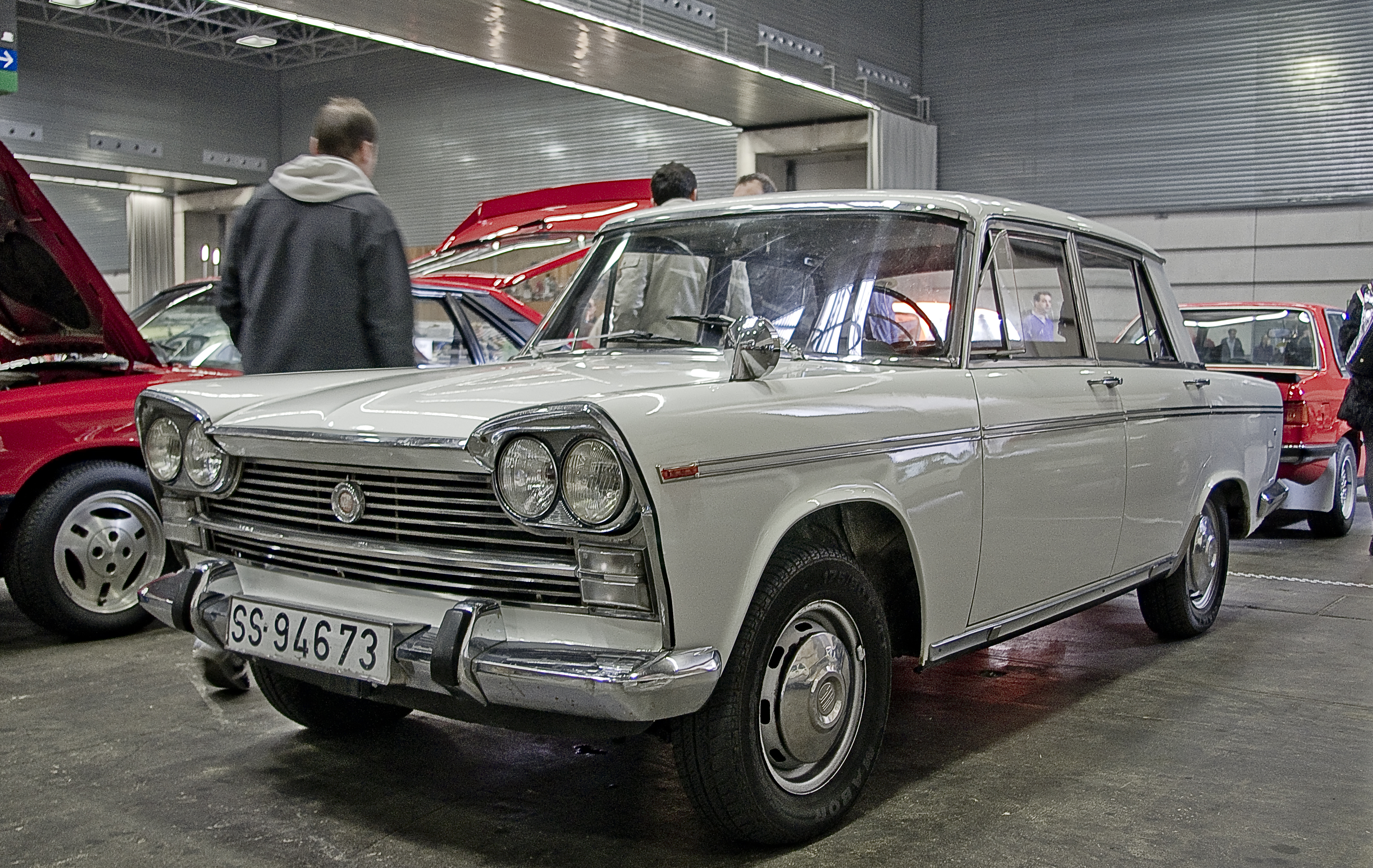
- 1970 SEAT 1500 sedan

Overview
- Manufacturer: SEAT
- Also called: SEAT 1800/2000 Diesel
- Production: 1963–1973
- Assembly: Spain: Barcelona (Zona Franca)
- Designer: Dante Giacosa

Body and chassis
- Class: Large family car (D)
- Body style: 4-door saloon 5-door estate pick-up
- Layout: FR layout
- Related: SEAT 1400 C Fiat 1400; Fiat 1800/2100

Powertrain
- Engine: 1,481 cc I4; 1,767 cc OM636 I4 (1800 D); 1,988 cc OM615 I4 (2000 D)
- Transmission: 4-speed manual

Dimensions
- Wheelbase: 265 cm (104.3 in)
- Length: 447 cm (176.0 in)
- Width: 162 cm (63.8 in)
- Height: 143 cm (56.3 in)
- Kerb weight: 1,210 kg (2,670 lb)

Chronology
- Predecessor: SEAT 1400
- Successor: SEAT 132

The SEAT 1500 was a Spanish-built 6-seater model of saloon and estate cars, based on the Italian Fiat 2300 and using a 1481 cc engine from the Fiat 1500. The 1500 was the successor to the SEAT 1400 C; it was manufactured from 1963 to 1973, with the five door estate ("Familiar") version arriving in 1965. Apart from the larger engine, differences between the 1500 and the C version of its predecessor were limited to minor details such as a speedometer that now read up to 160 km/h (100 mph).

There was also a '1500 pick-up' offered, and the coach builder ONECA developed a long-wheelbase 'pullman' version. A total of 134,766 cars were built.

== Engine ==
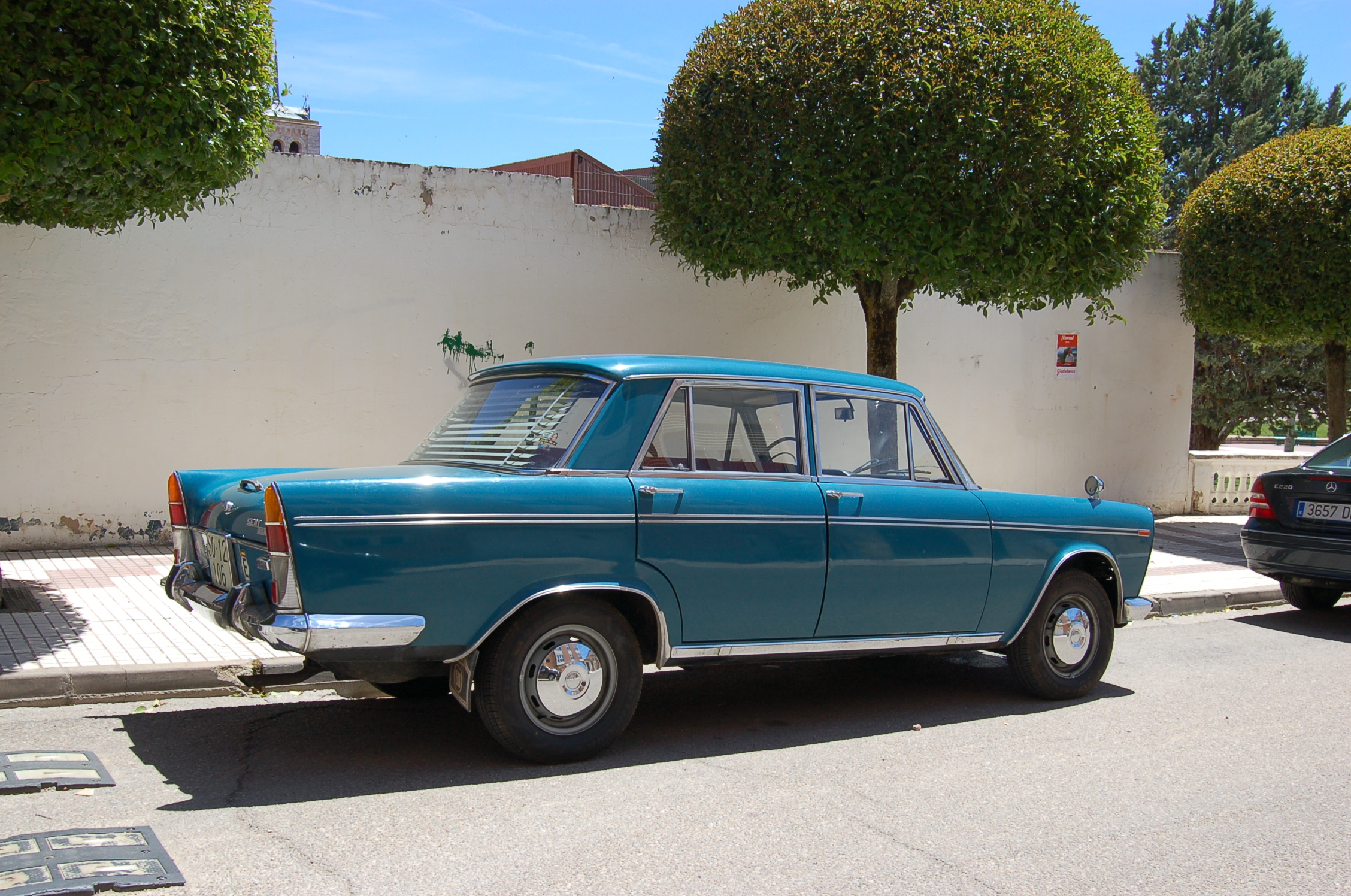
SEAT 1500 (rear view)

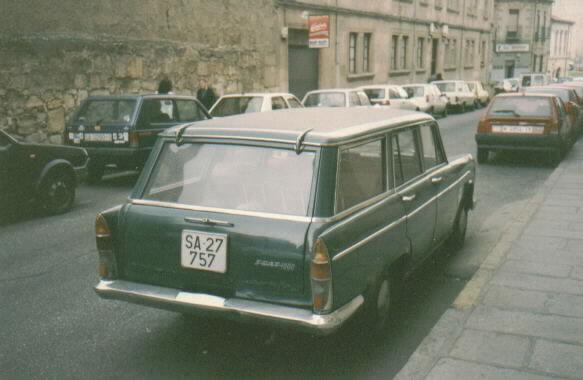
SEAT 1500 Familiar

Engine options were initially restricted to a 1481 cc petrol fuelled water cooled unit, driving the rear wheels via a four speed all synchromesh gearbox. With this engine a top speed of 145 km/h (90 mph) was claimed. After 1968, demand for petrol engined versions of the SEAT 1500 fell away with the introduction of the SEAT 124, a more modern design based on the Fiat 124 with a much better power-to-weight ratio.

From 1969, both 1.8 and 2-litre diesel versions of the SEAT 1500 were offered, and most would be used as taxis. Initially only cars with the smaller diesel engines were delivered, using an engine last seen in the Mercedes-Benz 180D with a claimed output in this application of 46 PS (34 kW; 45 bhp). According to one report this version took nearly 50 seconds to reach 100 km/h (62 mph), but fuel cost savings were impressive, helped by the lower level of sales tax on diesel fuel. These were the first diesel-powered saloons manufactured in Spain. Fiat were not producing suitable diesel engines at this stage, and thus SEAT chose to have the engines supplied by Mercedes-Benz and Perkins Engines. The diesel engines supplied to SEAT by Mercedes-Benz were versions of the four-cylinder diesel OM636 engines that powered the Mercedes-Benz 180d. The 1800 Diesel could be bought through either SEAT or Mercedes-Benz dealerships in Spain; the engines were built under license by Empresa Nacional de Motores de Aviación (ENMASA) in Barcelona.

== Body ==
The Fiat-based body used the Pininfarina-styled, boxy design which had been used on the 'C' version of SEAT's 1400 since 1959: it was broadly similar to the designs provided by the same designer to Peugeot and BMC at this time. The car originally had a single pair of headlights, but from 1969, double headlamps similar to those fitted on the Fiat 2300 were a feature of the SEAT 1500s. The post-1969, twin headlight models acquired the soubriquet 'Bifaro' in Spain.
