= SEAT 1400 =

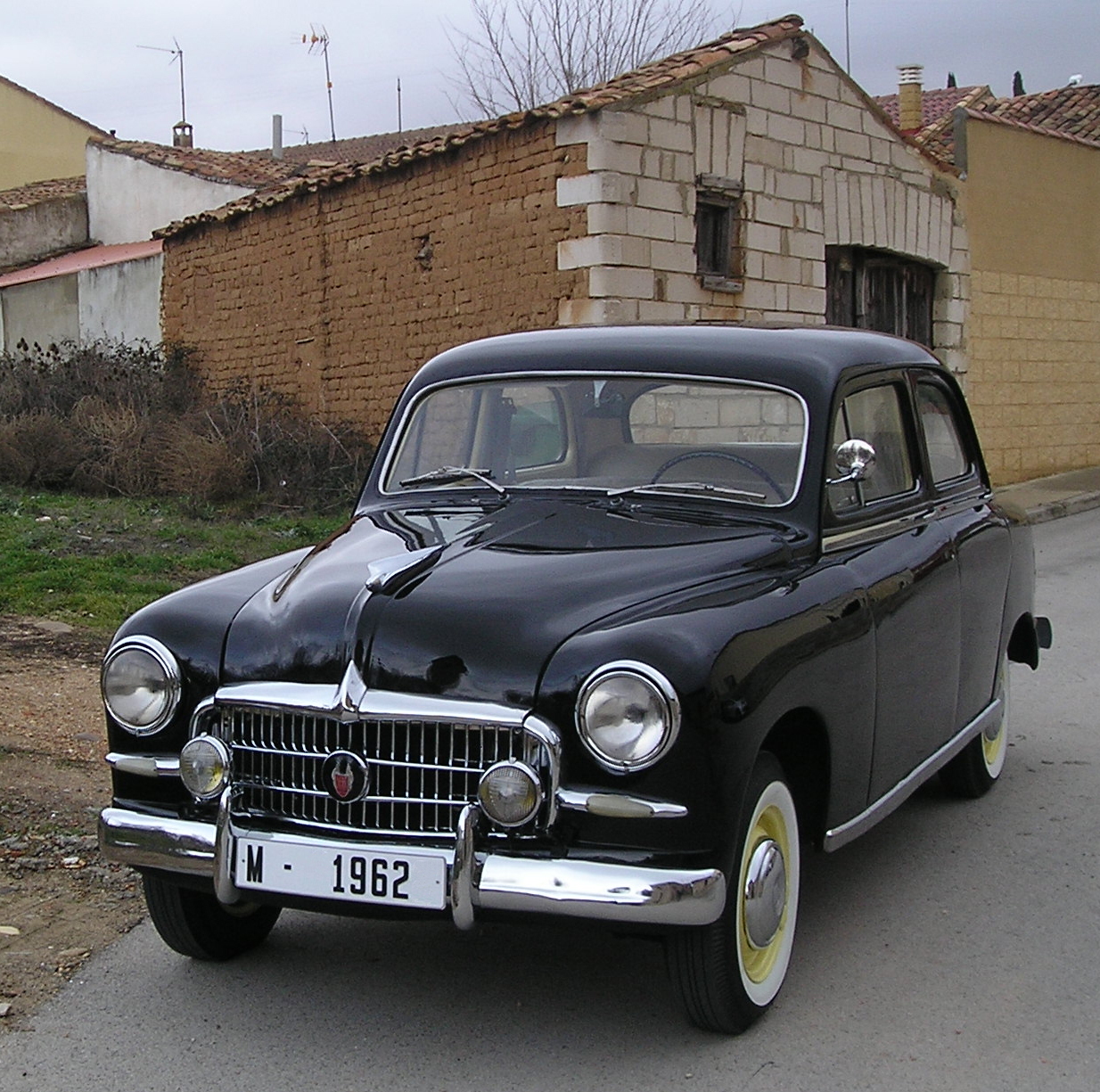
- SEAT 1400 A

Overview
- Manufacturer: SEAT
- Production: November 1953 – 1963
- Assembly: Spain: Barcelona (Zona Franca)
- Designer: Dante Giacosa

Body and chassis
- Class: Large family car (D)
- Body style: 4-door saloon 5-door estate
- Layout: front-engine, rear-wheel drive
- Related: Fiat 1400

Powertrain
- Engine: 1,395 cc I4
- Transmission: 4-speed manual

Dimensions
- Wheelbase: 265 cm (104.3 in)
- Length: 424 cm (166.9 in)
- Width: 166 cm (65.4 in)
- Height: 153 cm (60.2 in)
- Curb weight: 1,150 kg (2,540 lb) – 1,250 kg (2,760 lb)

Chronology
- Successor: SEAT 1500

The SEAT 1400 is a rear-wheel-drive four-door mid-size sedan built by the Spanish car maker SEAT between 1953 and 1963. It was the first model produced by SEAT, and the first car to be assembled at the firm's then-new plant located in Barcelona's Zona Franca zone.

== Overview ==
Based on the Fiat 1400, Fiat's first integrated chassis model, production started on November 13, 1953, carried out by an early workforce of 925 employees with a potential of 5 units produced per day; the first example carried the license plate 'B-87.223'.

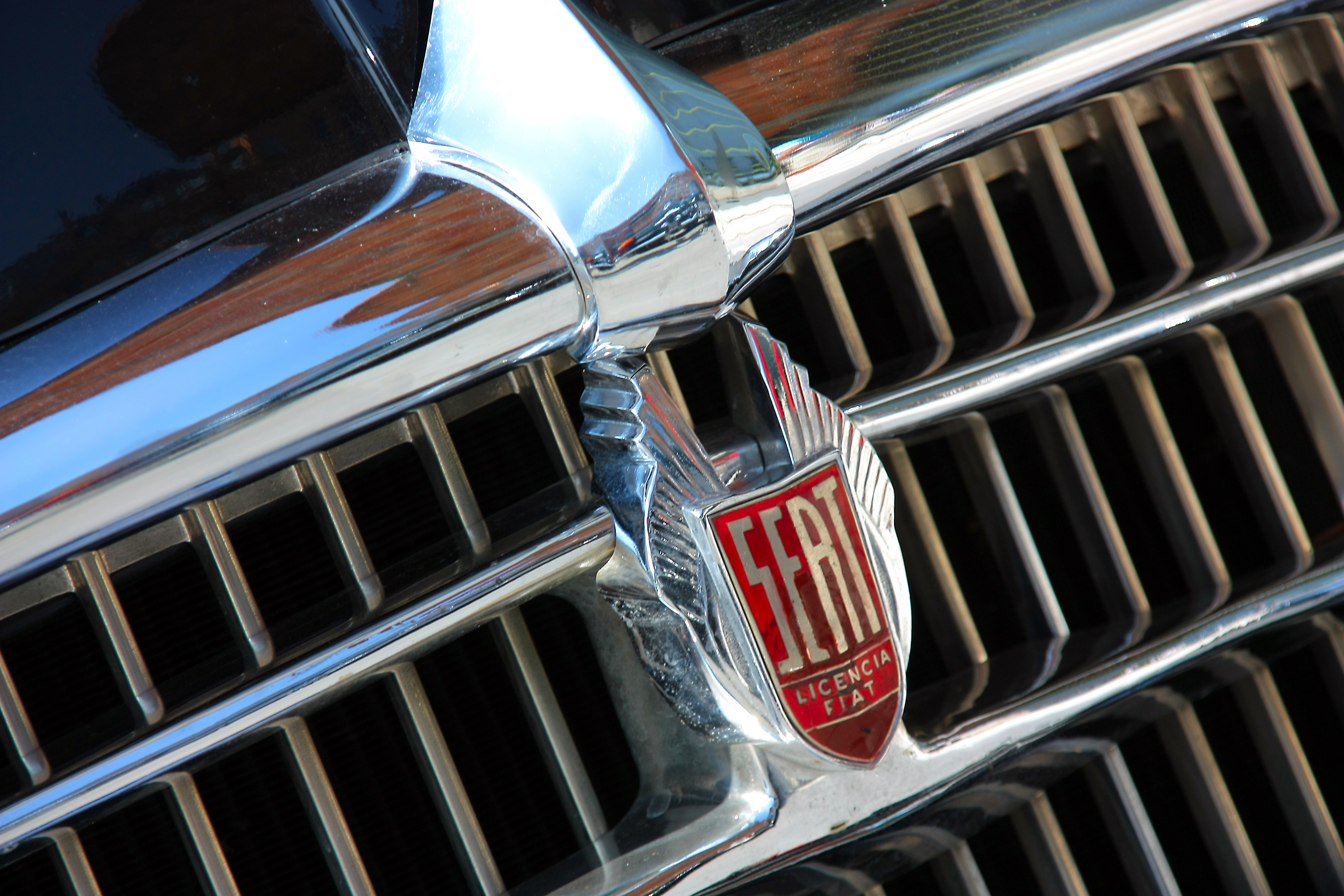

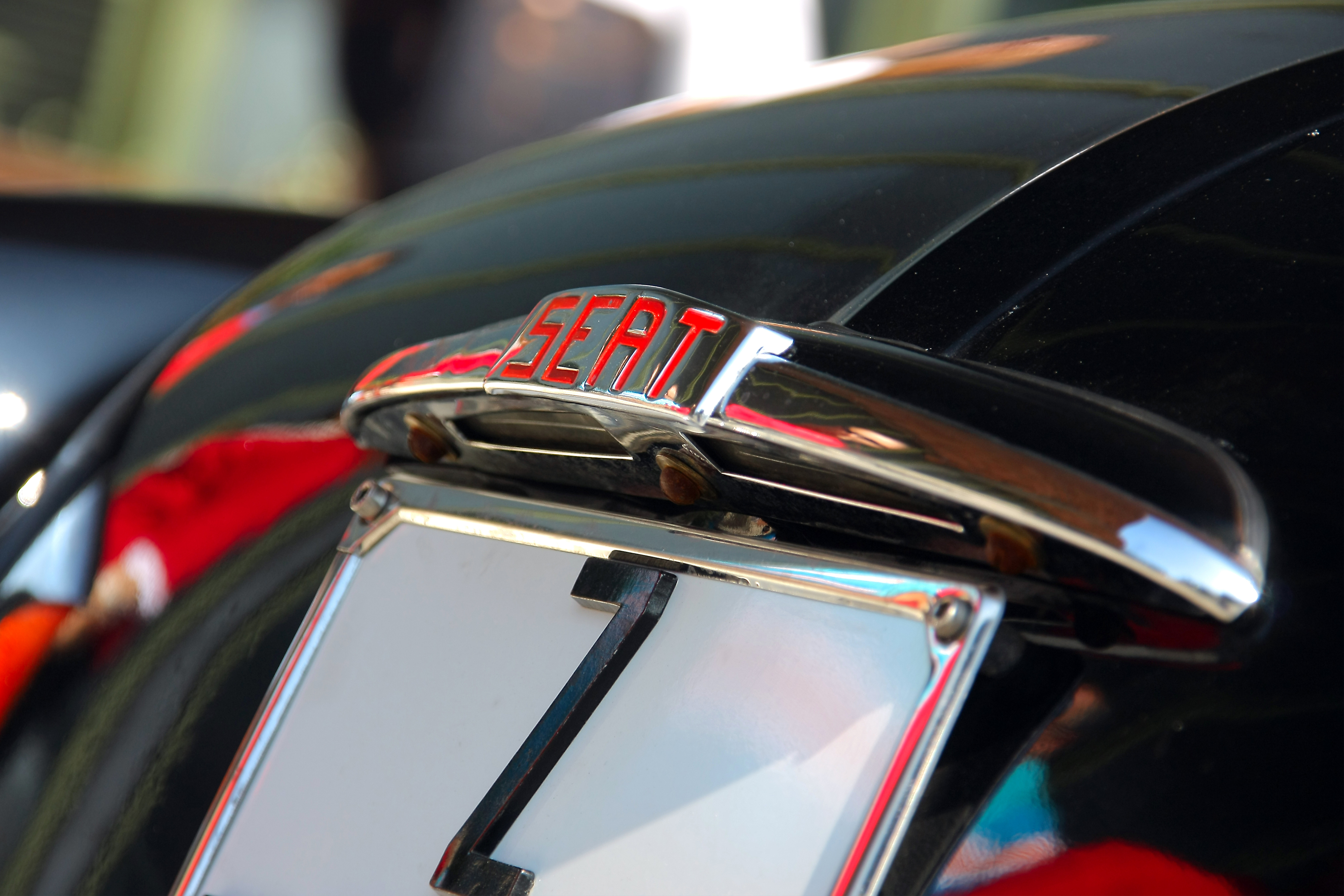
The SEAT 1400 was the first model launched and produced by SEAT

Initially, components were shipped as CKD kits from Italy and assembled by SEAT at their plant in Zona Franca, but in 1954 the Spanish-made parts content rose to a 93% proportion of the total in order to limit imports and to help the development of the almost non-existent Spanish supplier industry, thus fulfilling SEAT's assigned key role in the development of the Spanish economy as the national car maker of the post World War II Spain. In the next few years the model's production output would gradually increase, and by 1956 10,000 cars would be produced annually, with an average of 42 cars per day.

The first SEAT 1400, offered between 1953 and 1955, incorporated a 1395 cc four-cylinder water-cooled Fiat engine with a claimed output of 44 bhp and top speed of 120 km/h (75 mph).

In 1963, when the car was replaced by the SEAT 1500, 82,894 examples covering four distinctively different versions of the 1400 had been produced.

== Variants ==
=== SEAT 1400 ===
The first 1400 variant was only manufactured for one year, from May 1953 to May 1954. Initially, the bodywork didn't feature a large amount of chrome trim, which increased in number and size with each new version over the years. It was available with black, red, or white optional roofs.

Having only been in production for one year, the number of units manufactured was very small, around 2,114. The engine was a 1,395 cc water-cooled inline 4-cylinder, which developed 44 hp, allowing this first version to reach a top speed of 120 km/h.

=== SEAT 1400 A ===
The SEAT 1400 A, the first revision, launched for 1955 was a modernised version of the original 1400, based on the Fiat 1400 A which had appeared from Turin the previous year. Published power output was now raised to 50 bhp and the top speed to 125 km/h (78 mph).

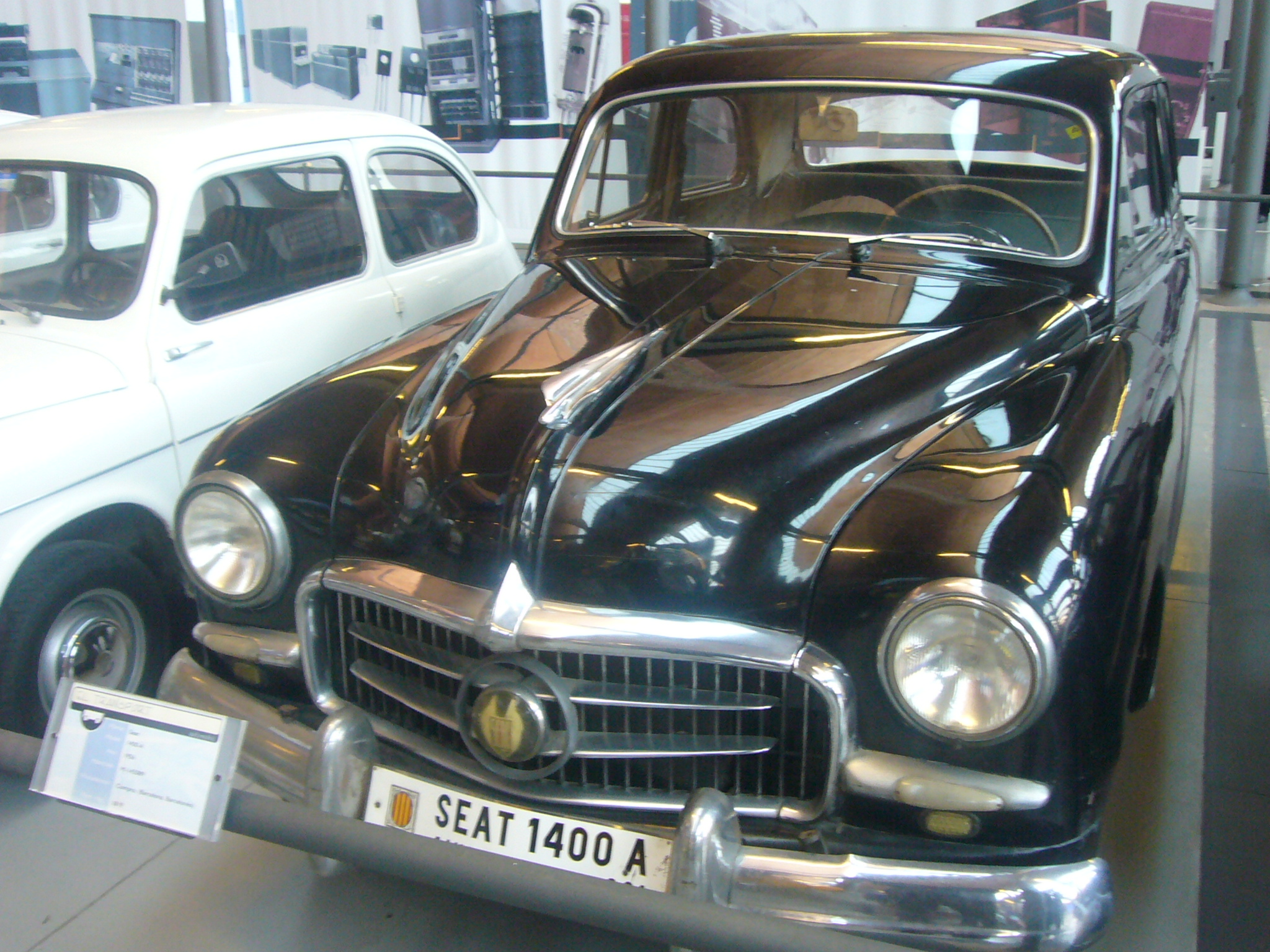
SEAT 1400 A

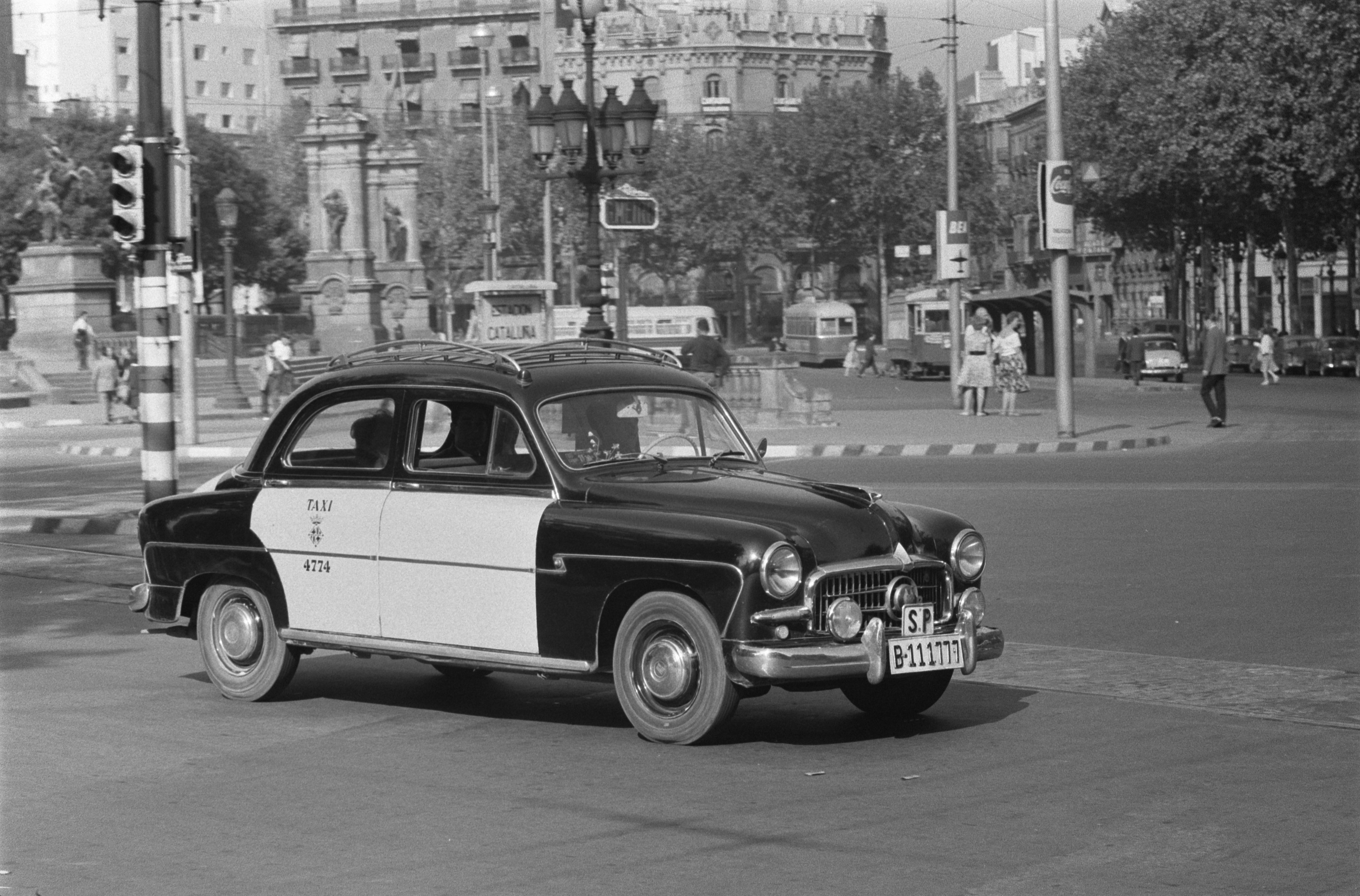
A SEAT 1400 A taxi from Barcelona

=== SEAT 1400 B ===
Announced at the end of 1956, the SEAT 1400 B appearing for 1957 retained its predecessor's bodywork but featured a revised front grille and offered a two tone paint scheme. In addition to the sedan, a five-door station wagon and commercial delivery truck version were available. Claimed engine output and maximum speed for the sedan were, from 1958, 58 bhp and 135 km/h (84 mph). This version of the 1400 would continue in production until 1964.

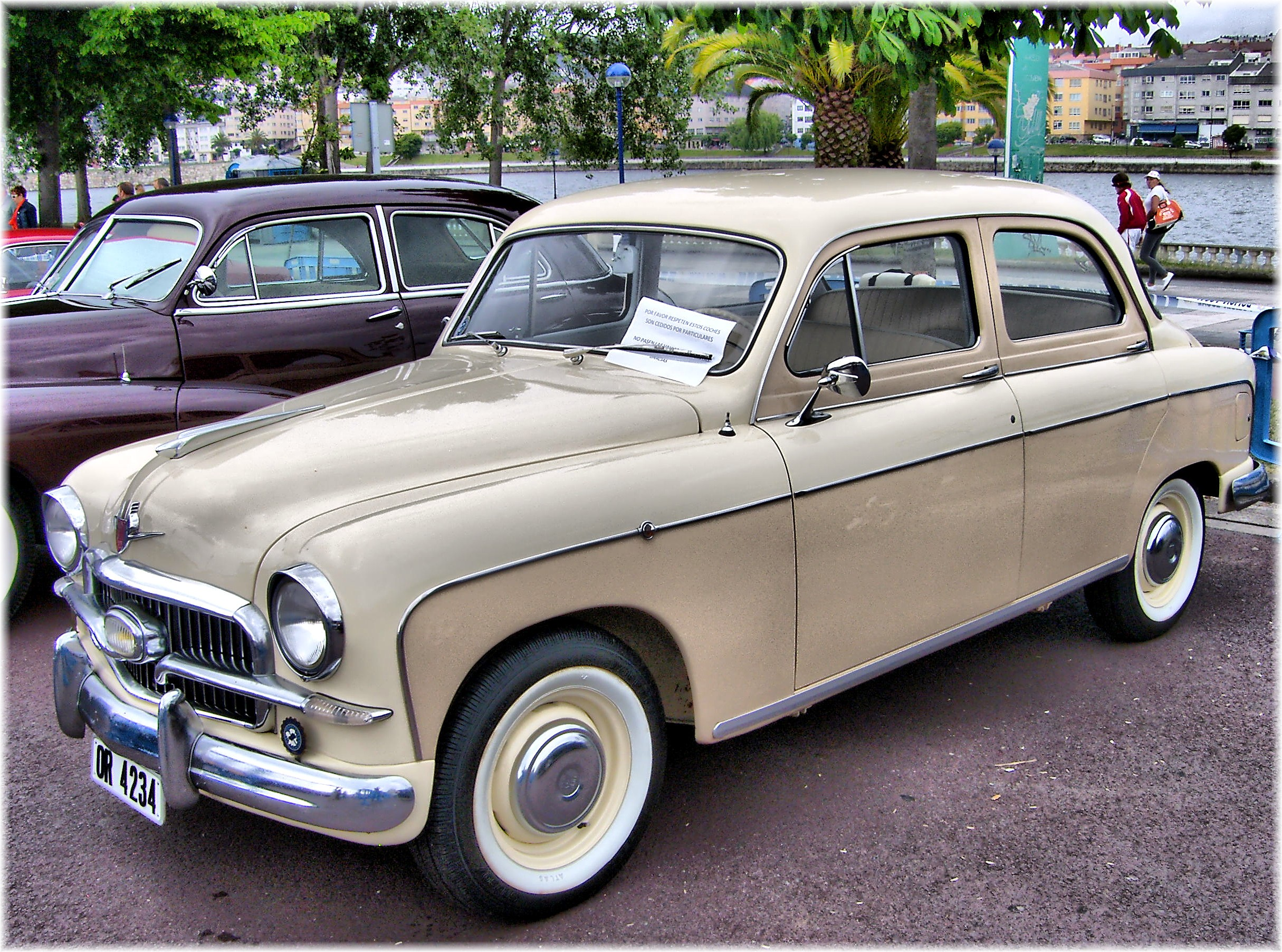
SEAT 1400 B

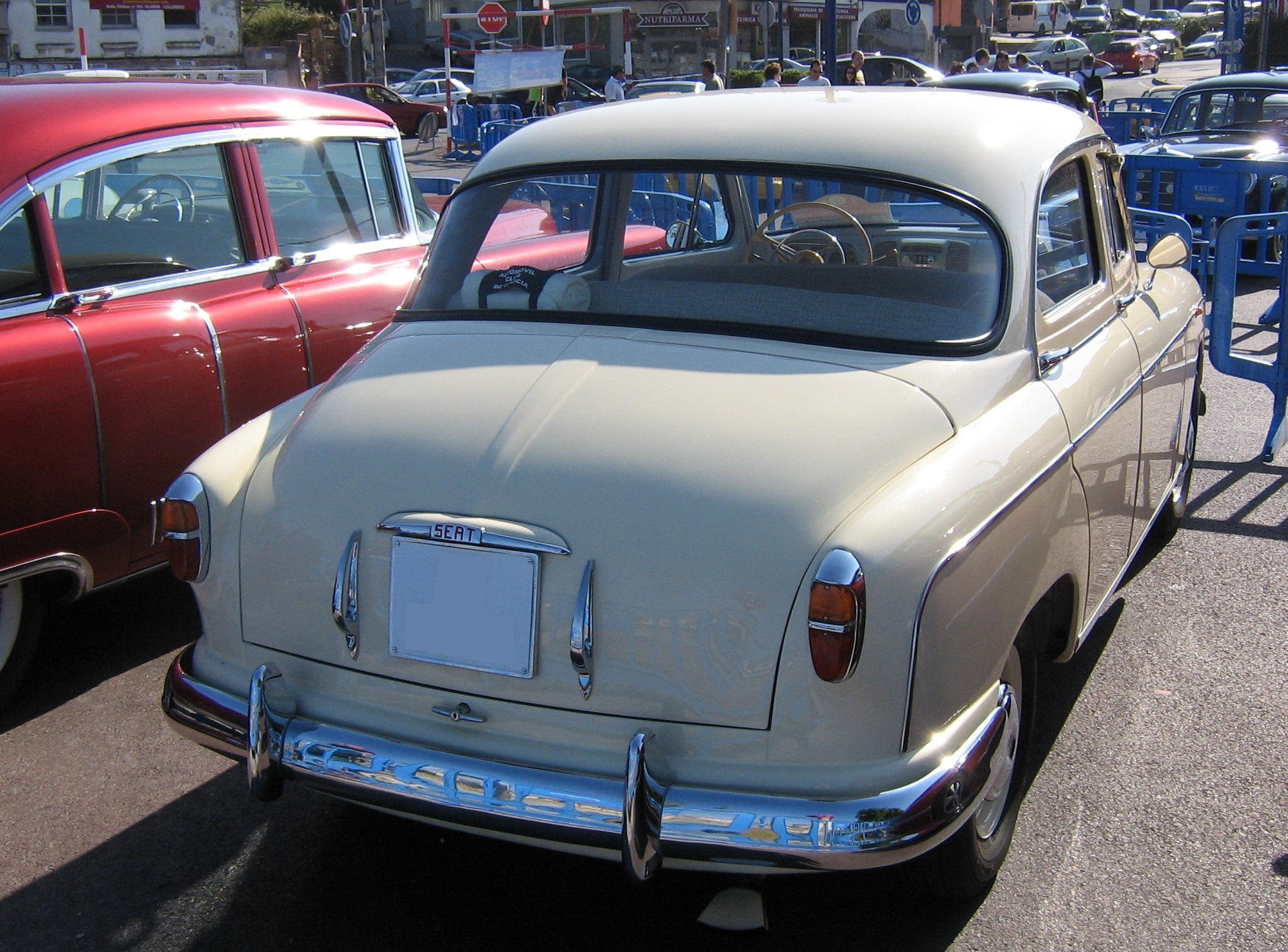
SEAT 1400 B (rear view)

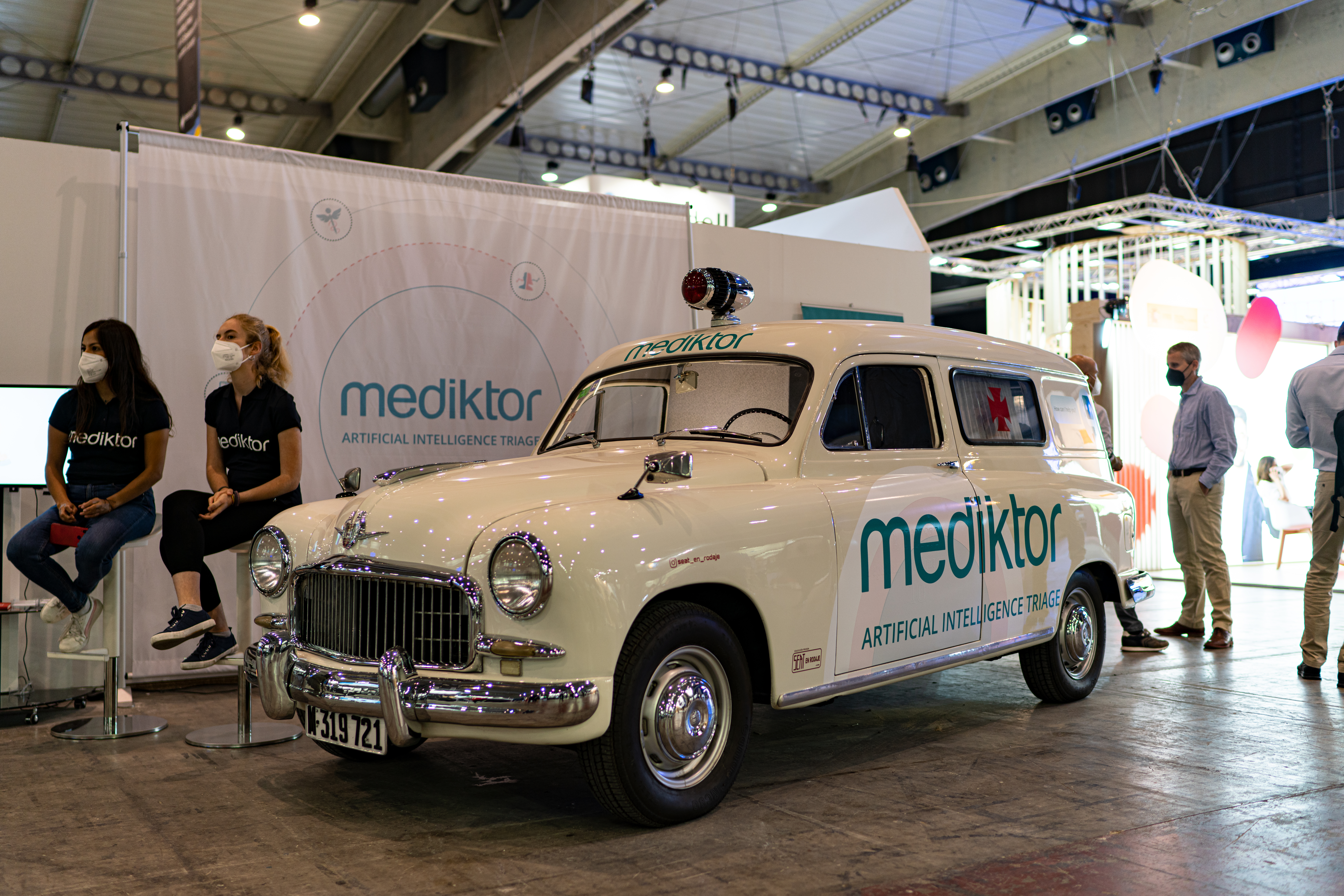
SEAT 1400 B ambulance

=== SEAT 1400 C ===
The SEAT 1400 C was introduced in 1960. The modern Pininfarina styled body, came from the recently introduced Fiat 1800. The previous SEAT 1400 B remained in production: the two cars were offered in parallel, sharing the same engine, though the newer car was longer and slightly heavier than the old. The decision to fit the old four-cylinder unit in the new bodied SEAT rather than to tool up for assembly in Catalonia of the new six-cylinder engines being fitted by Fiat in the new-bodied cars appears to have been taken on cost grounds: disposable incomes in Spain at this time were far lower than those in Italy. In 1963 a five-door estate version of the 1400 C appeared, featuring a two-piece tailgate. The introduction of a diesel-engined version would have to await the successor model, however.

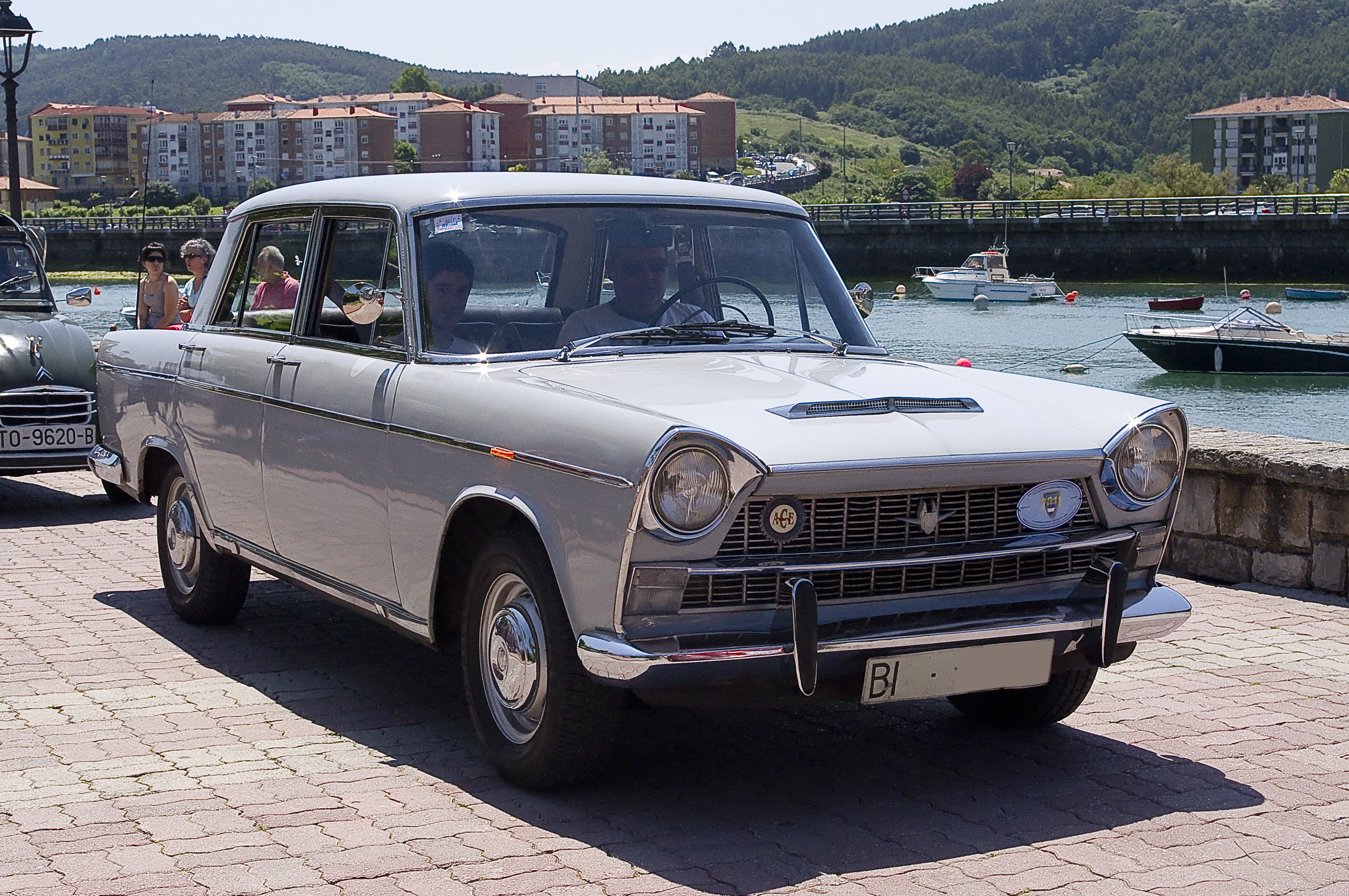
The SEAT 1400 C was rather a preview of the SEAT 1500 model

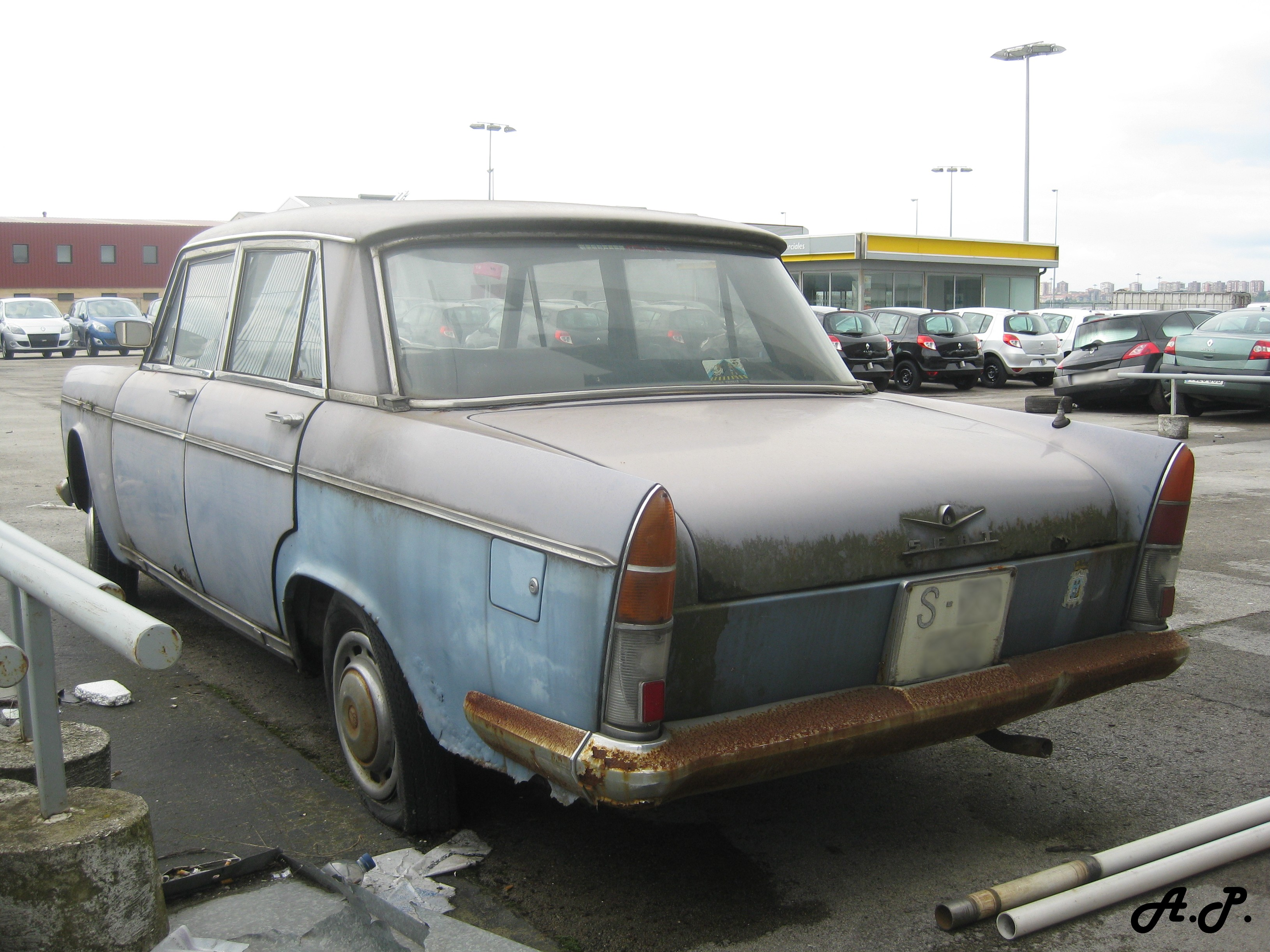
SEAT 1400 C (rear view)
