= Fiat 2300 =

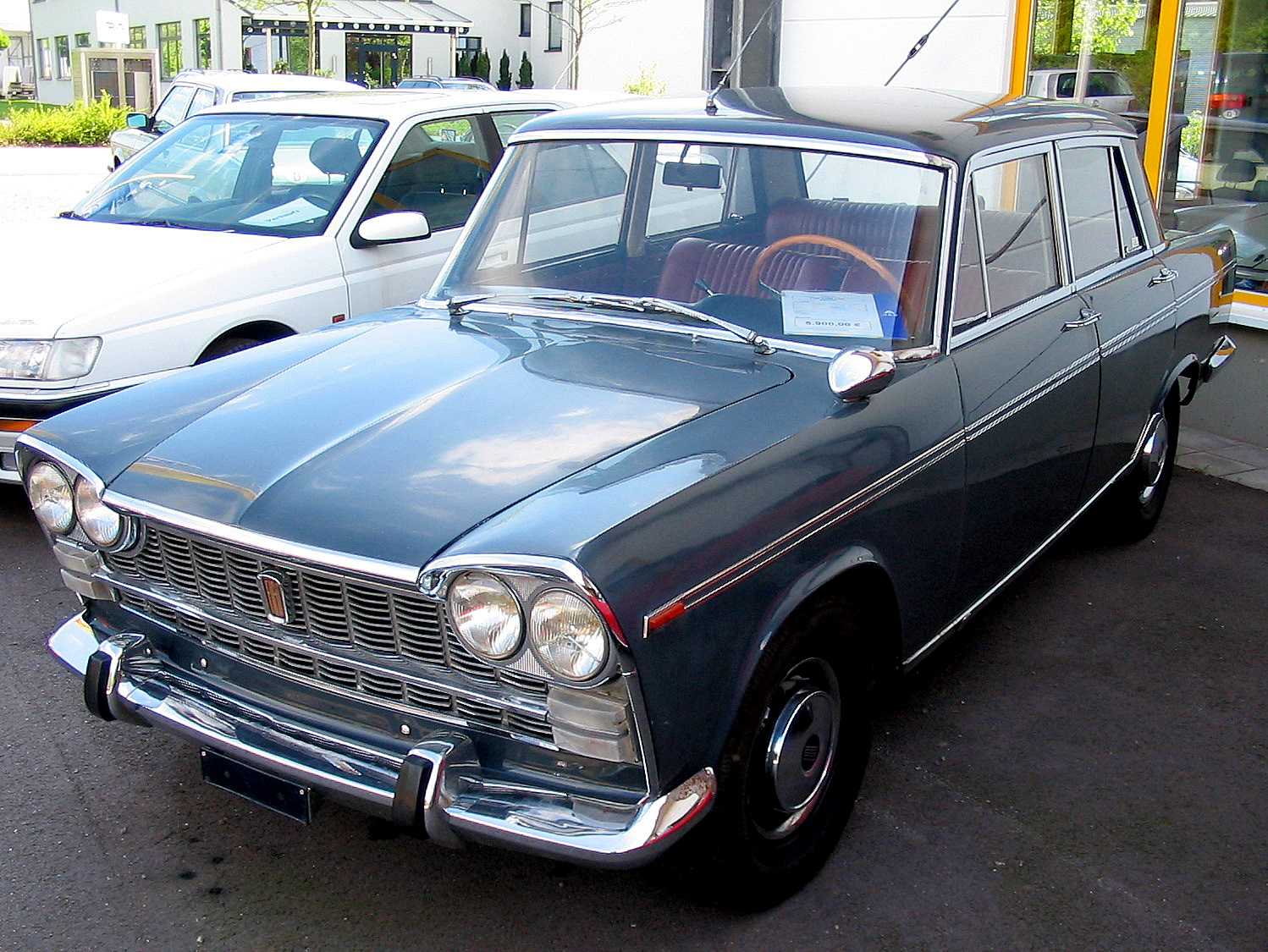
- Fiat 2300 saloon

Overview
- Manufacturer: Fiat
- Production: 1961–1968
- Designer: Saloon: Tom Tjaarda at Pininfarina; Coupé: Sergio Sartorelli at Ghia

Body and chassis
- Class: Executive car
- Body style: 4-door saloon 2-door coupé 5-door estate
- Layout: Front-engine, rear-wheel-drive
- Related: Fiat 1800 and 2100

Powertrain
- Engine: 2.3 L I6 (petrol)
- Transmission: 4 speed manual 3-speed Borg Warner automatic

Dimensions
- Wheelbase: 2,650 mm (104.3 in); Speciale: 2,730 mm (107.5 in)
- Length: 4,485 mm (176.6 in); Speciale: 4,705 mm (185.2 in)
- Width: 1,620 mm (63.8 in)
- Height: 1,470 mm (57.9 in); Familiare/Speciale: 1,485 mm (58.5 in)
- Kerb weight: 1,285–1,345 kg (2,833–2,965 lb)

Chronology
- Predecessor: Fiat 2100
- Successor: Fiat 130

The Fiat 2300 is a six-cylinder executive car which was produced by Italian automotive manufacturer Fiat between 1961 and 1968. The 2300 was made as saloon (styled by Dante Giacosa), estate car and coupé. The 2300 saloon is noteworthy as in 1966 it became the first Fiat model to be available with an automatic transmission.

== History ==
The 2300 was derived from the earlier 2100, essentially a facelift with a larger engine. The engine had a longer stroke as well as a somewhat bigger bore than the 2100, and provided a top speed of 160 km/h (99 mph) in the manual version. At the exterior, the front received twin headlights and featured a bit more chrome than the related, four-cylinder 1800B. A station wagon (Familiare) with a horizontally split tailgate was also available, as was a limousine version called the 2300 Speciale. Intended for representational use, the Speciale had a longer wheelbase and longer rear bodywork, as well as ample equipment and a redesigned front end with a different headlight arrangement and a more minimalist grille with five horizontal bars.

At the 1963 Geneva Motor Show, the Fiat 2300 Lusso was presented. This had a redesigned rear end with more modern looking, larger taillights and a squared off bootlid. Improvement levels were also improved, including an optional, boot-mounted air conditioning system (with split control for the front and rear seats), available power steering, standard overdrive, and an alternator rather than a dynamo – being the first Italian car thus equipped. The Lusso could also be had as a Familiare. The Lusso also spelled the end of the 2300 Speciale and eventually it became the only version.

== Specifications ==
The Fiat 2300 used unibody construction. Front suspension was by double wishbones, sprung by torsion bars, with hydraulic dampers and an anti-roll bar; at the rear there was a solid axle with leaf springs, hydraulic dampers and an anti-roll bar. The brakes were servo-assisted discs on all four corners. On most 2300s and all 2300S coupés the transmission was an all-synchromesh 4-speed manual, with optional overdrive. A Saxomat automated clutch was available as optional extra; from 1966 a Borg Warner 3-speed automatic was offered in its place.

The overhead valve straight-six engine had a cast iron block and an aluminium cylinder head. While the 2300 engine was fitted with a single twin-choke downdraught carburettor, the more powerful 2300S used two twin-choke horizontal carburettors.

Model	Years	Engine	Displacement Bore x stroke	Power at rpm	Fuel system
2300	1961–1968	I6 OHV	2,279 cc (139 cu in); 78 mm × 79.5 mm (3.1 in × 3.1 in)	105 hp CUNA (77 kW; 104 bhp) at 5300; 117 hp SAE (86 kW; 115 bhp) at 5300	Twin-choke carburettor
2300 S	1963–1968	I6 OHV	2,279 cc (139 cu in); 78 mm × 79.5 mm (3.1 in × 3.1 in)	136 hp CUNA (100 kW; 134 bhp) at 5600; 150 hp SAE (110 kW; 148 bhp) at 5600	Two twin-choke carburettors

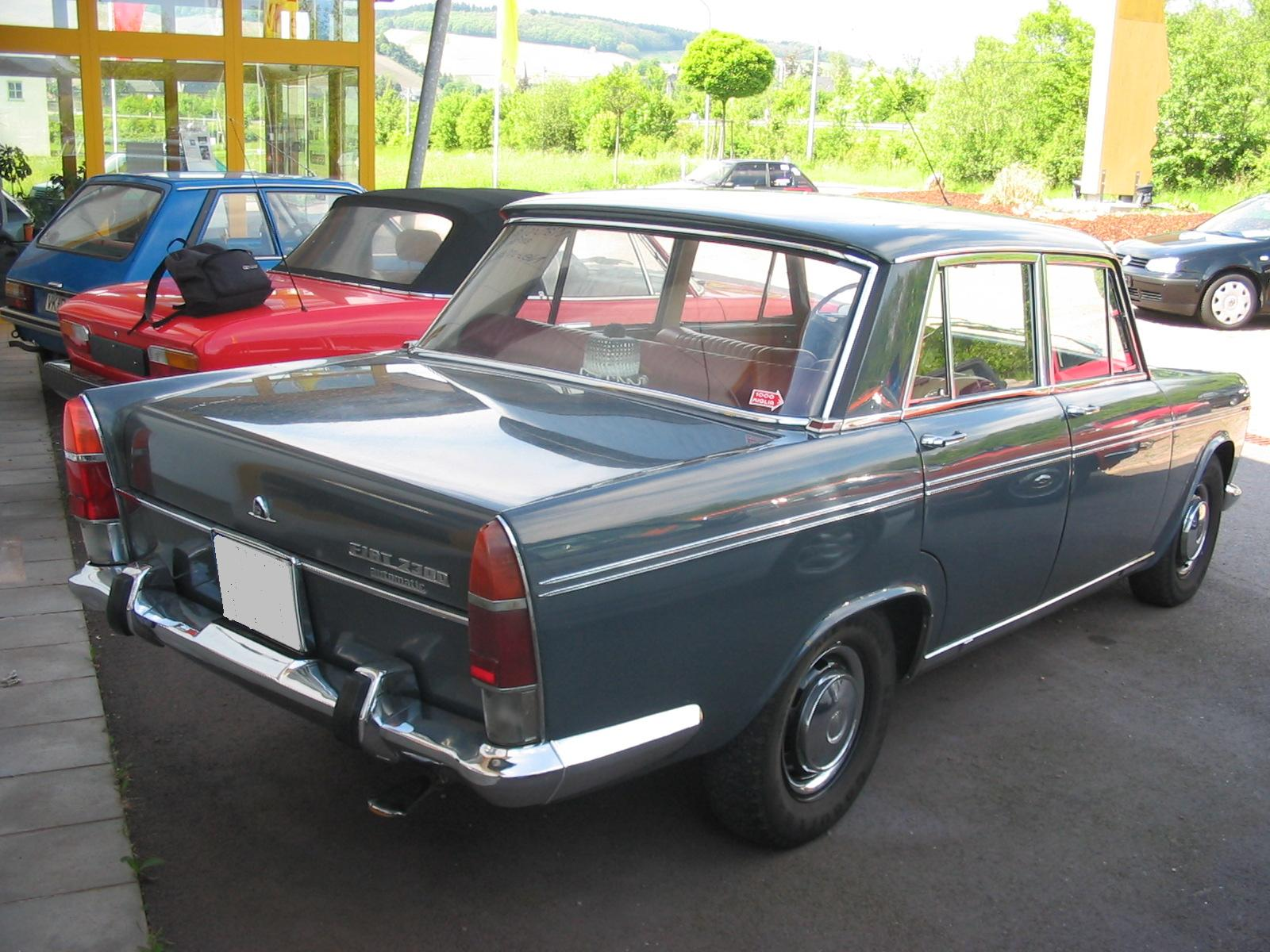
Fiat 2300 Saloon (late model with the revised rear)

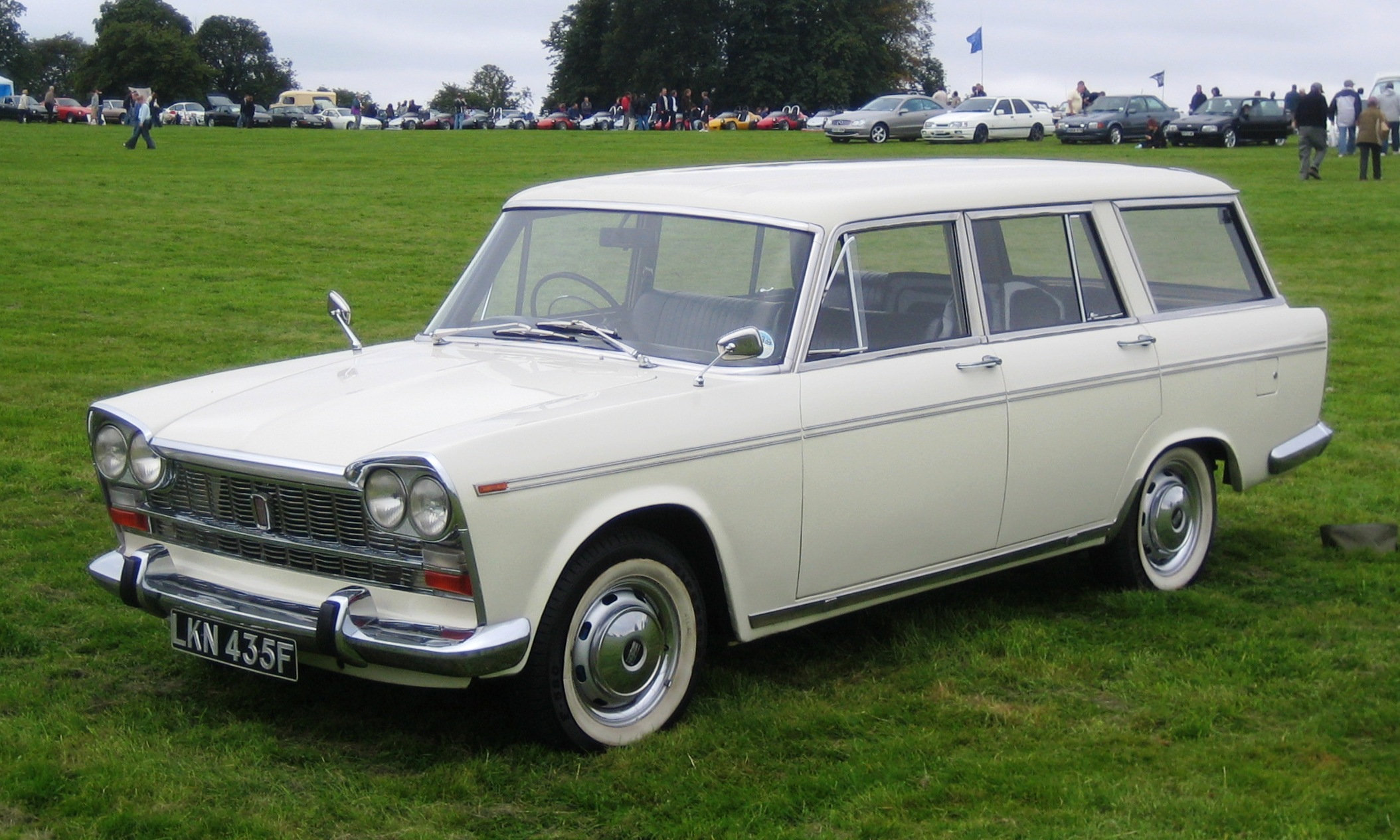
Fiat 2300 Estate in UK (1967)

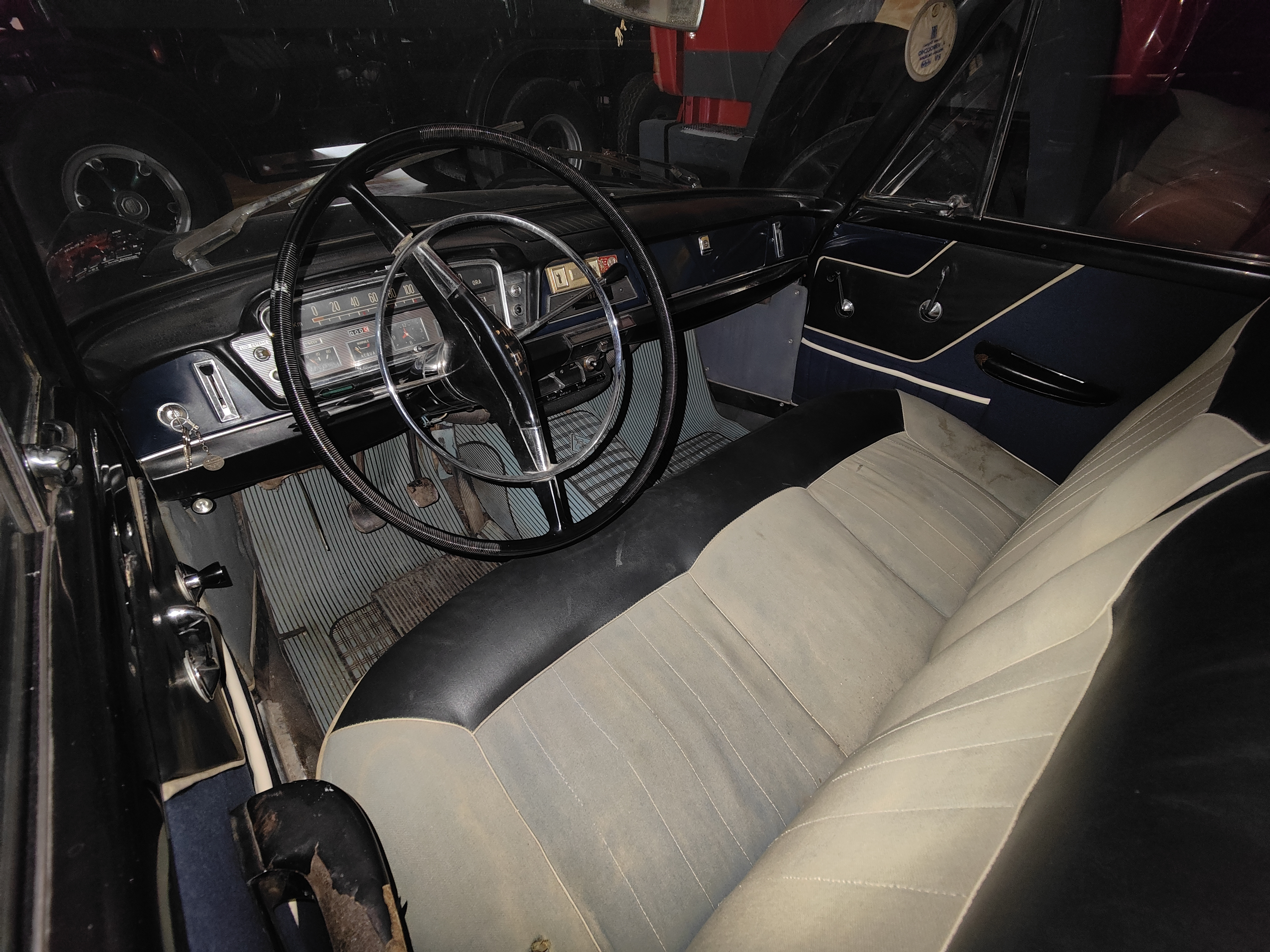
Detail of the driver's seat of the saloon

== 2300 Coupé ==
Alongside saloon and estate models the 2300 range included Ghia-designed grand tourers, the Fiat 2300 Coupé and 2300S Coupé—the latter fitted with a more powerful engine with double twin-choke carburettors, tuned by Abarth. The shape of the car was first seen in public when Ghia presented it as a prototype sports coupé at the 1960 Turin Motor Show, based on the 2100 as the 2300 had not yet been presented. A production version, based on the newly launched Fiat 2300 saloon was presented in 1961 and went on general sale in 1962. Having developed the coupé body, Ghia lacked the production capacity needed for the volumes envisaged, and were obliged to subcontract its production to OSI. Production was complex and Fiat could not produce as many as they could sell, which led to wait times of up to 18 months.

The coupé body was welded to the standard floor platform of the 2300 saloon with which it shared its core components. While a new model, the 2300 Berlina was in most respects a well-proven design, being a larger-engined version of the Fiat 2100 that had been available since 1959. The wheelbase was identical, but the coupé had a slightly wider track at both ends than the saloon, and final drive gearing for the coupé was increased to 3.9 (3.63 or 3.72 for the 2300S coupé) which translated to 33.6 km/h (20.9 mph) per 1,000 rpm. Inside the 2300 Coupé featured power operated windows and other luxury fittings.

During 1964, the Coupé underwent some minor modifications to the trim, including a chrome spear emanating from the air outlet low on the front fender. Called the Series II, the update also brought the discontinuation of the lower-powered 2300 Coupé, leaving only the more powerful 2300S. Production ended in early 1968, after having been sold alongside the new Fiat Dino for a while. Around 7,000 of the 2300 Coupés were built in total.

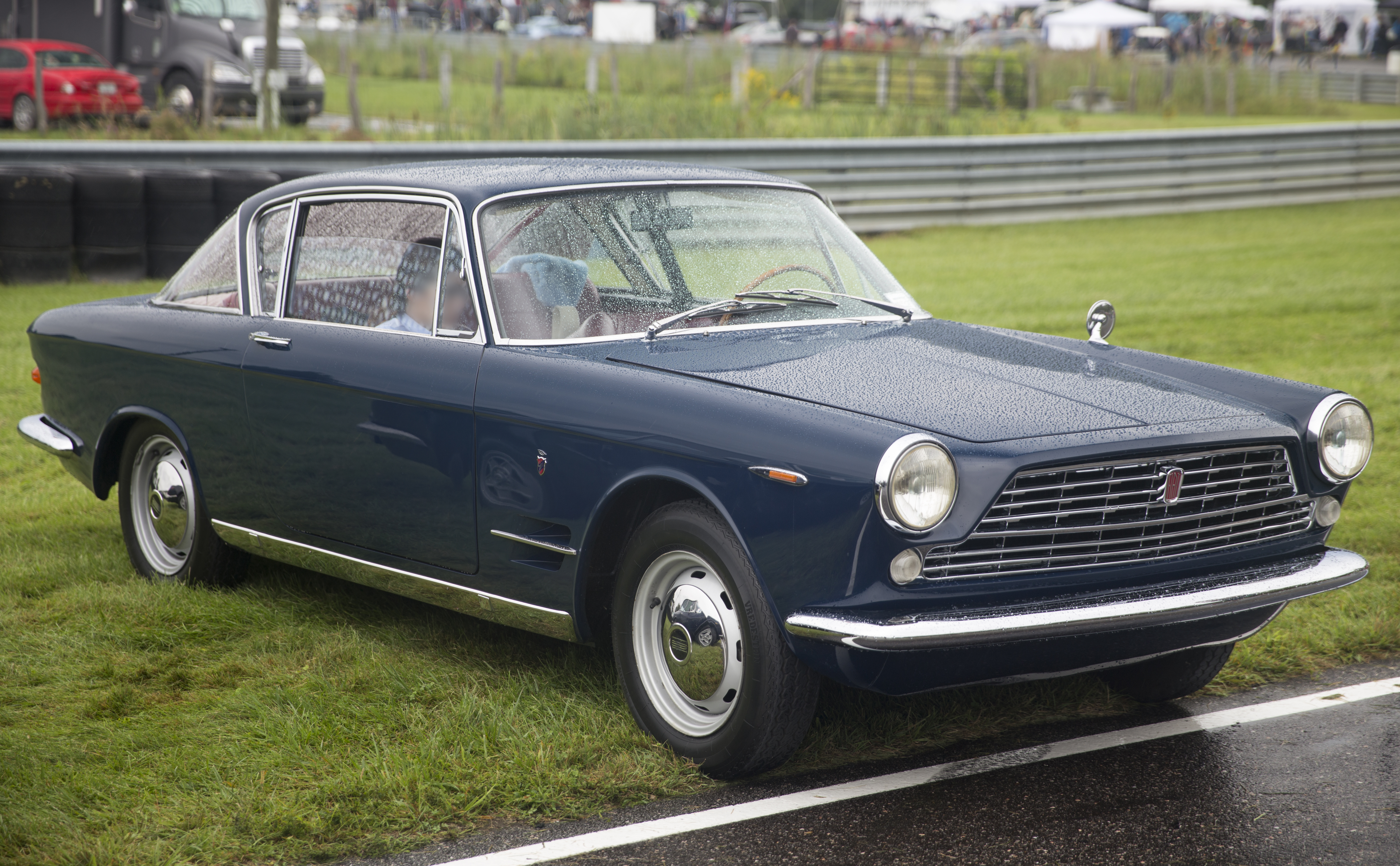
Fiat 2300 S Coupé (Series I)

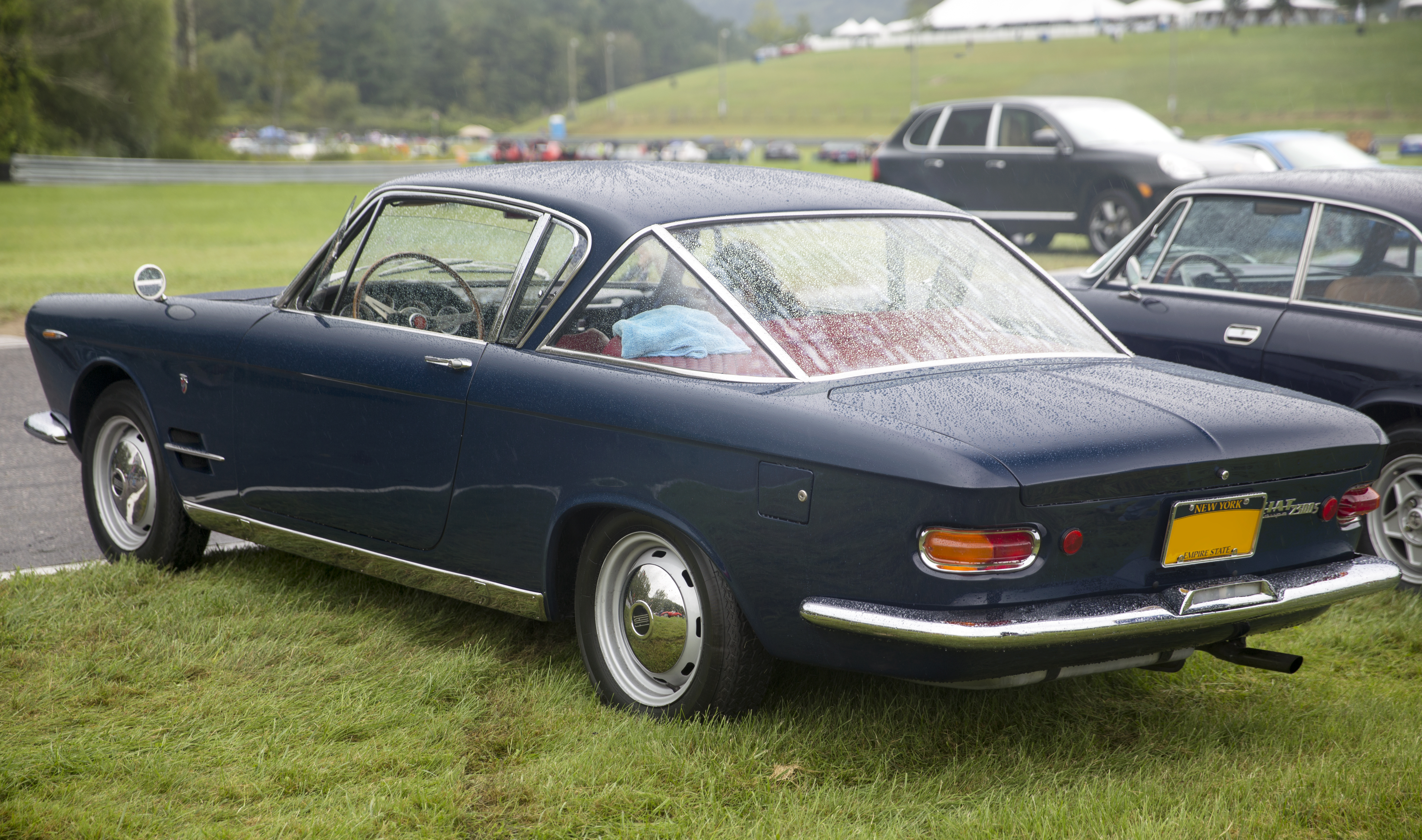
Fiat 2300 S Coupé (Series I; rear)

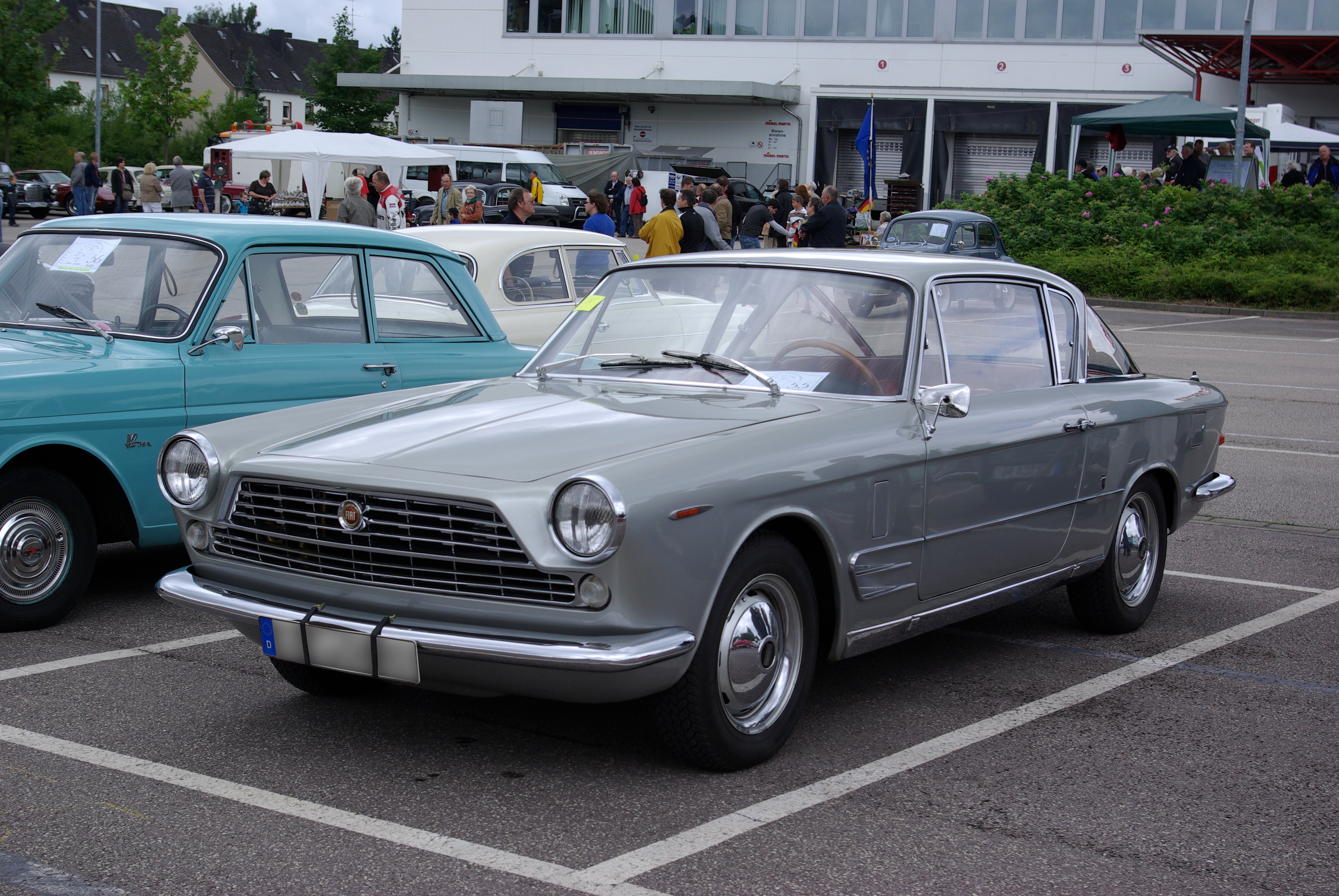
Fiat 2300 S Coupé (Series II)

== Derivatives and coachbuilt versions ==
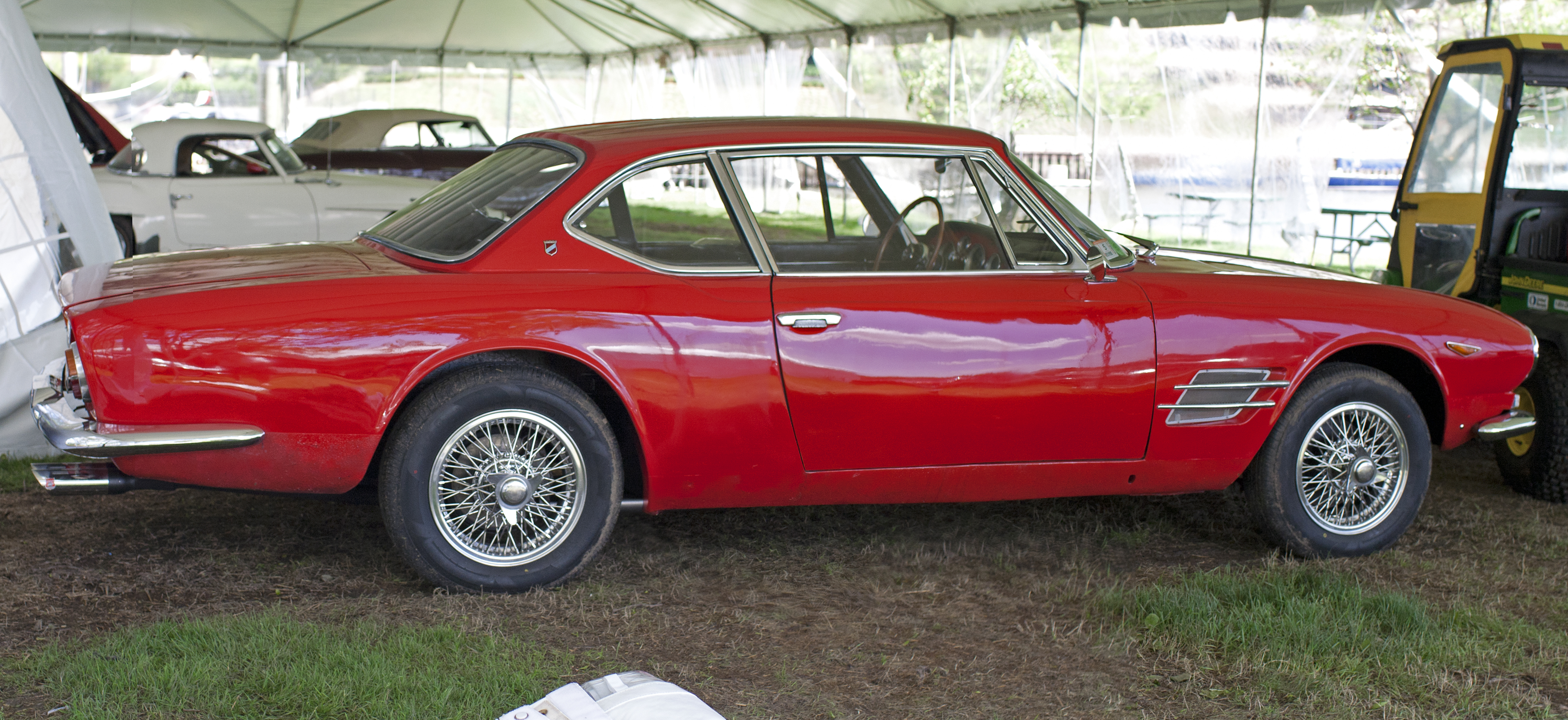
A 1962 Moretti 2500 SS Coupé

As Fiat's flagship model, the 2300 was the subject of numerous special bodies by Italy's many coachbuilders. As they had with the 2100, Carrozzeria Francis Lombardi offered a seven-seater representational limousine based on the 2300. Sergio Sartorelli of Ghia designed the 2300 Coupé, of which Ghia also developed convertible and a more spacious, fastback-styled shooting brake derivative called the Club. Three convertibles and two Clubs were built. Several other carrozzieri also tried their hand at making a gran turismo out of the 2300, with Giovanni Michelotti being responsible for at least four designs:

Moretti developed the 2500 SS, a 2.5-liter version with in-house bodywork designed by Giovanni Michelotti, available as a coupé or a convertible. The 2500 SS' engine was bored out by three millimetres; the resulting bore and stroke are 81.0 mm × 79.5 mm (3.19 in × 3.13 in) for a displacement of 2458 cc. It was tuned and fitted with twin double carburetors as well and produces 170 hp (125 kW) at 5800 rpm. The buyer could also opt to fit the car with the regular 2300 S engine, in which case the car was called the Moretti 2300 S. The Moretti 2300 was not significantly more expensive than the Ghia-bodied Coupé, but sales remained small. About 20 examples of all varieties of the large Moretti were built, beginning in 1962.

Small coachbuilders Carrozzeria Savio showed a rather formal looking, "transatlantic" coupé with rectangular headlights in 1963, designed by Giovanni Michelotti. Four examples were built, all with more or less significant design differences - one car has scalloped sides, head and taillight treatments differ, etcetera. In March 1964, Boneschi presented a convertible based on the 2300 at a coachbuilder's salon in Turin.

At the 1966 Geneva Motor Show, Michelotti presented his own proposal to replace the Ghia coupé, but this remained a one-off.

=== Abarth 2400 ===
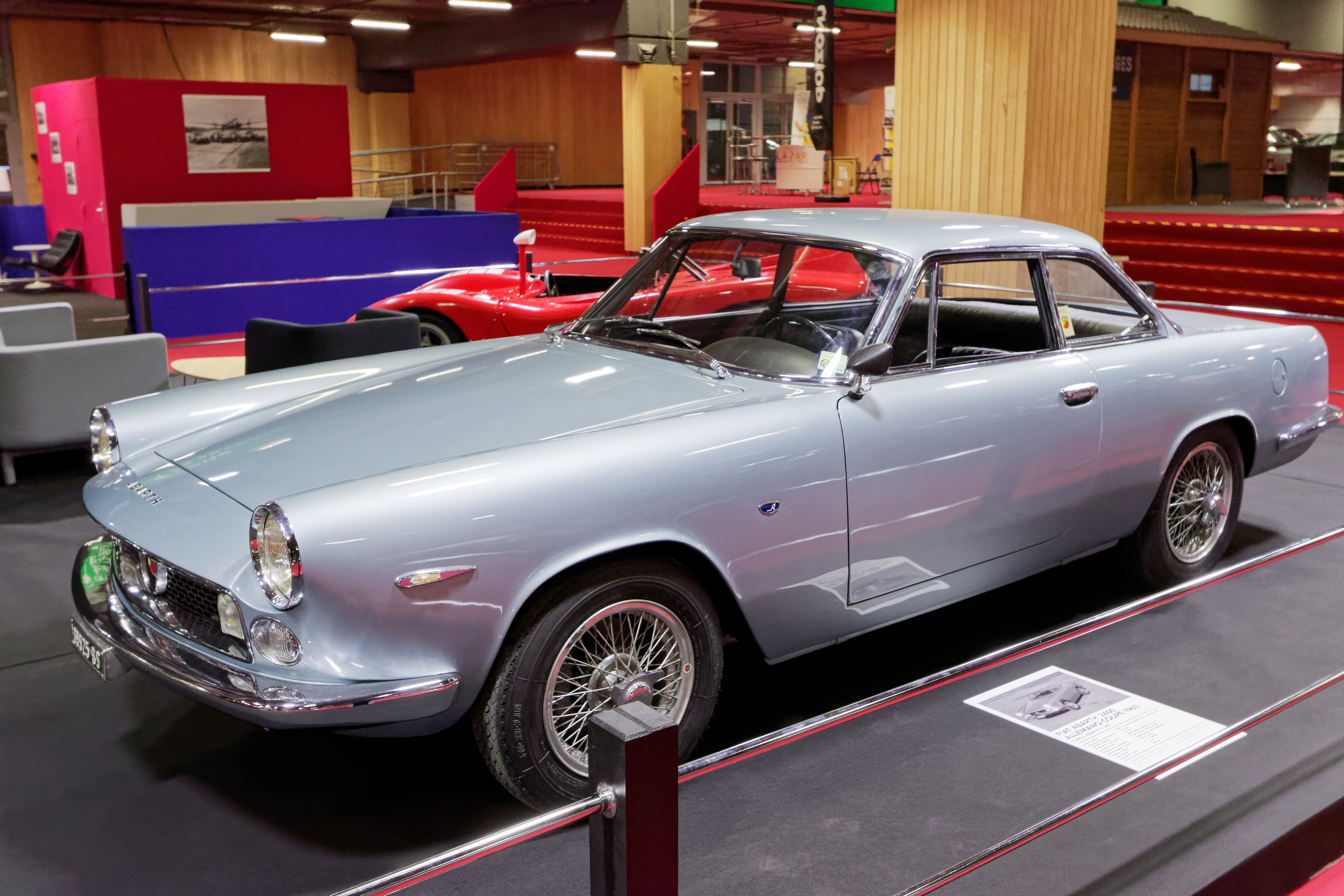
Chassis 001, the original, Allemano-designed Abarth 2400 proposal

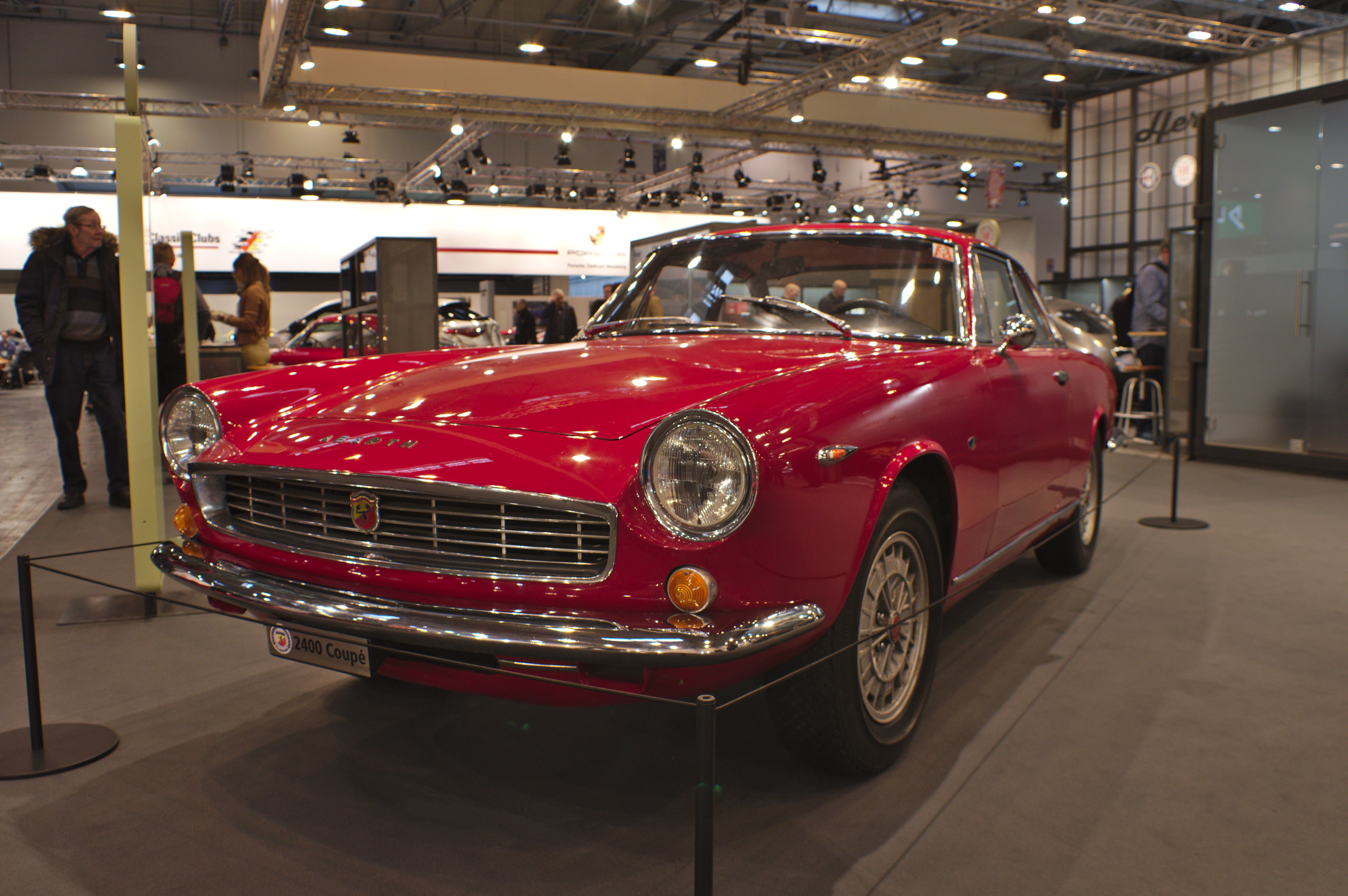
Abarth's private 2400 Coupé; mixed Allemano/Ellena design. This car was the one displayed at Geneva in 1964.

Since late 1959, Abarth had offered a series of aluminium-bodied 2+2 coupés and convertibles based on the 2100, called the Abarth 2200. When the 2300 appeared, Abarth continued this tradition, although there was no longer a convertible on offer. Stroking the 2200's engine created a square engine with dimensions of 79 mm × 79 mm (3.11 in × 3.11 in) and a displacement of 2323 cc. As with the earlier 2200, it has a four-speed, floor-shifted transmission, while the engine received Abarth's own cylinder head with a higher (9.5:1) compression ratio, triple Weber 38 DCOE carburetors and redesigned manifolds, and the typical, twin-tipped Abarth exhaust system. Claimed power increased to 142 hp (104 kW) at 5800 rpm with torque of 20 kg⋅m (196 N⋅m; 145 lb⋅ft) at 3,500 rpm; enough for the car to break the 200 km/h (125 mph) barrier. The four-wheel disc brakes were changed to Girling units from the earlier Dunlop ones.

For the Turin Auto Show in November 1961, Abarth had Carrozzeria Ellena and Allemano create two separate designs. The Allemano design (chassis 001) received bodywork clearly derived from their earlier 2200 Coupé, designed by Giovanni Michelotti and executed by Allemano. The original's single-piece vertical taillights were replaced with smaller round lamps mounted in a chrome panel, while the rear of the car and the greenhouse were more squared off than those of the predecessor. Ellena made a new design based on their earlier design applied to a few 2200s, with an oval grille, round wheel wells, no quarter glass, and a wraparound rear windshield. Abarth, however, was displeased with both of the proposed designs and further dismayed at the appearance of the new, Ghia-bodied Fiat 2300 Coupé at the same show. Costing a third less, Fiat's own model (albeit much heavier and with less power) undermined the case for the 2400. Abarth, always deeply involved with this car (he used a 2200 and then a 2400 as his personal transport until his death), decided to combine Allemano's front treatment with Ellena's rear, and so the production model has Allemano's more rectangular front and middle section and Ellena's vertical taillights. "Production", however, is a relative term: most sources state that 12 were built, while others say fewer than 10 examples. By 1963 the 2400 had disappeared from Abarth's price lists, but the story was not yet fully ended: When Abarth realized that Fiat would not premiere their new 850 until two months after the 1964 Geneva Salon he had to withdraw his new Fiat-Abarth OT 850 derivative. As a place holder, he put his personal 2400 on the company stand even though the model had already been long discontinued.

Only about forty examples of the 2200 and 2400 were built, all told, and the attempt to establish Abarth as a full fledged manufacturer of grand touring machines may be considered a failure. However, Fiat had Abarth develop the more powerful 2300 S engine and gave them several lucrative manufacturing contracts for the 2300 S (for the finned aluminium oil crankcase and some gearbox components). Abarth also received an exclusive contract for putting each 2300 S Coupé through a 200 km (125 mi) pre-delivery test drive, meaning that Abarth was able to recoup most of their investment in the 2200/2400. After the 2400, Abarth renewed their focus on their core businesses: small sporting cars, competition, and selling tuning parts for Fiats and others.

=== Ghia G230S ===
Carrozzeria Ghia's Sergio Sartorelli also developed a stylish coupé on 2300-basis, first shown at Turin in November 1963. The G230 S has a rakish front with low mounted twin headlights, developing a theme already seen on earlier cars like the Dual-Ghia, and a kammback rear with a large hatch and three-piece rear windshield. Unlike the Ghia-bodied official Fiat 2300 Coupé, the two-seater G230S was built on a tubular spaceframe designed and built by Gilco. Only two examples were built, plus two convertibles, but this car also served as inspiration for the better known Ghia 450 SS.

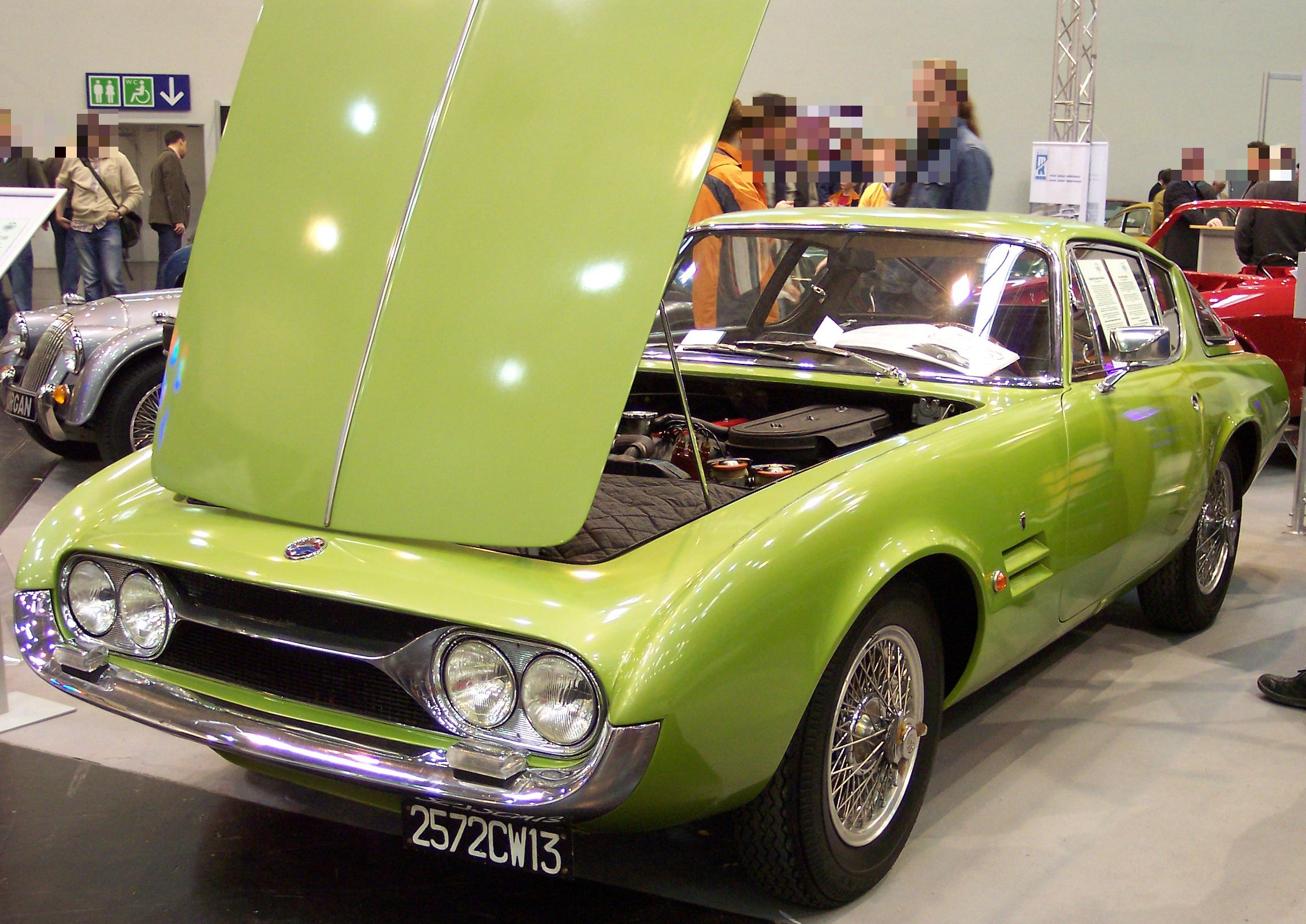
Ghia-Fiat G230 S, based on Fiat 2300 S

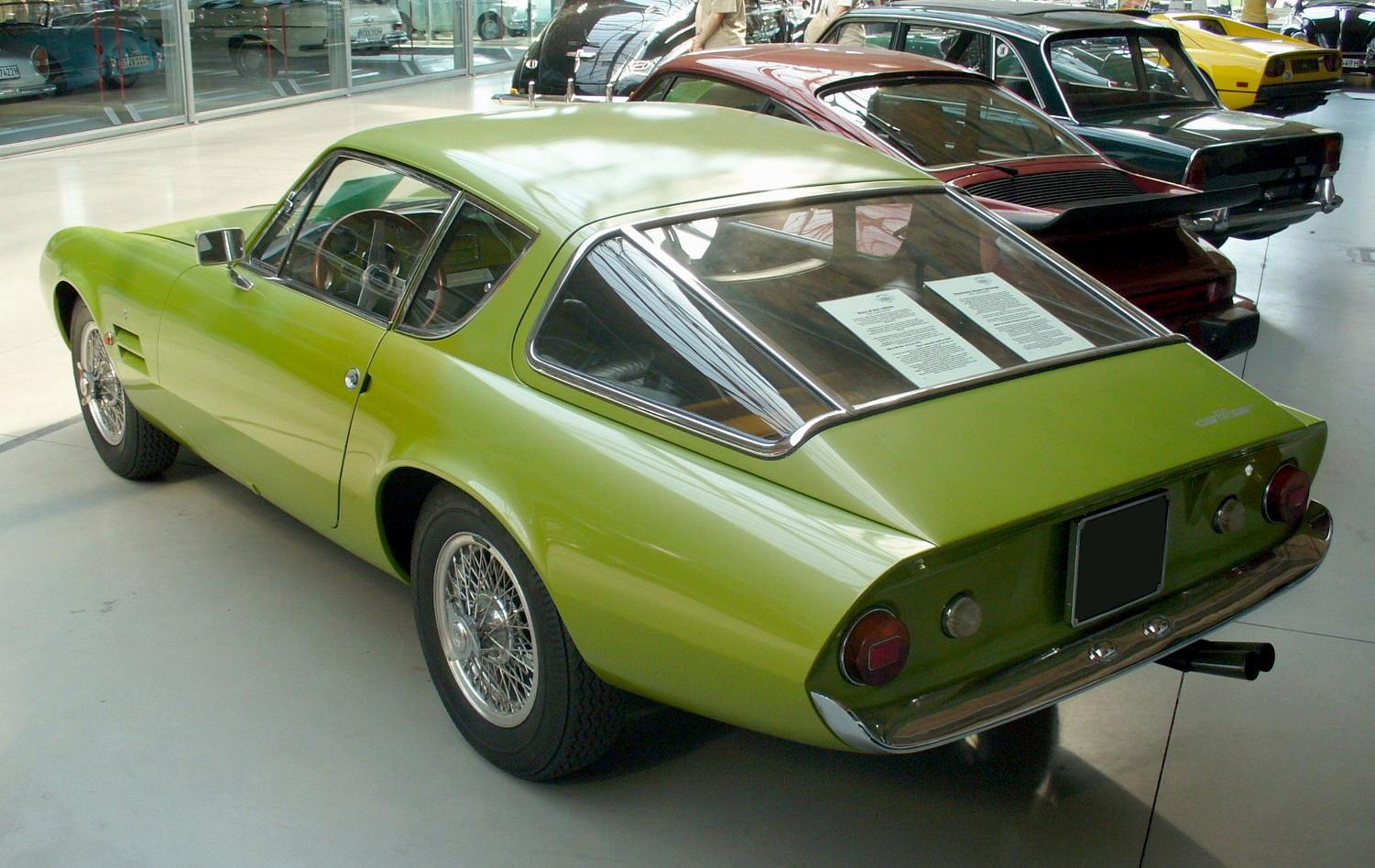
Rear view
