= Fiat 1800 and 2100 =

Fiat 1800/2100/1500L
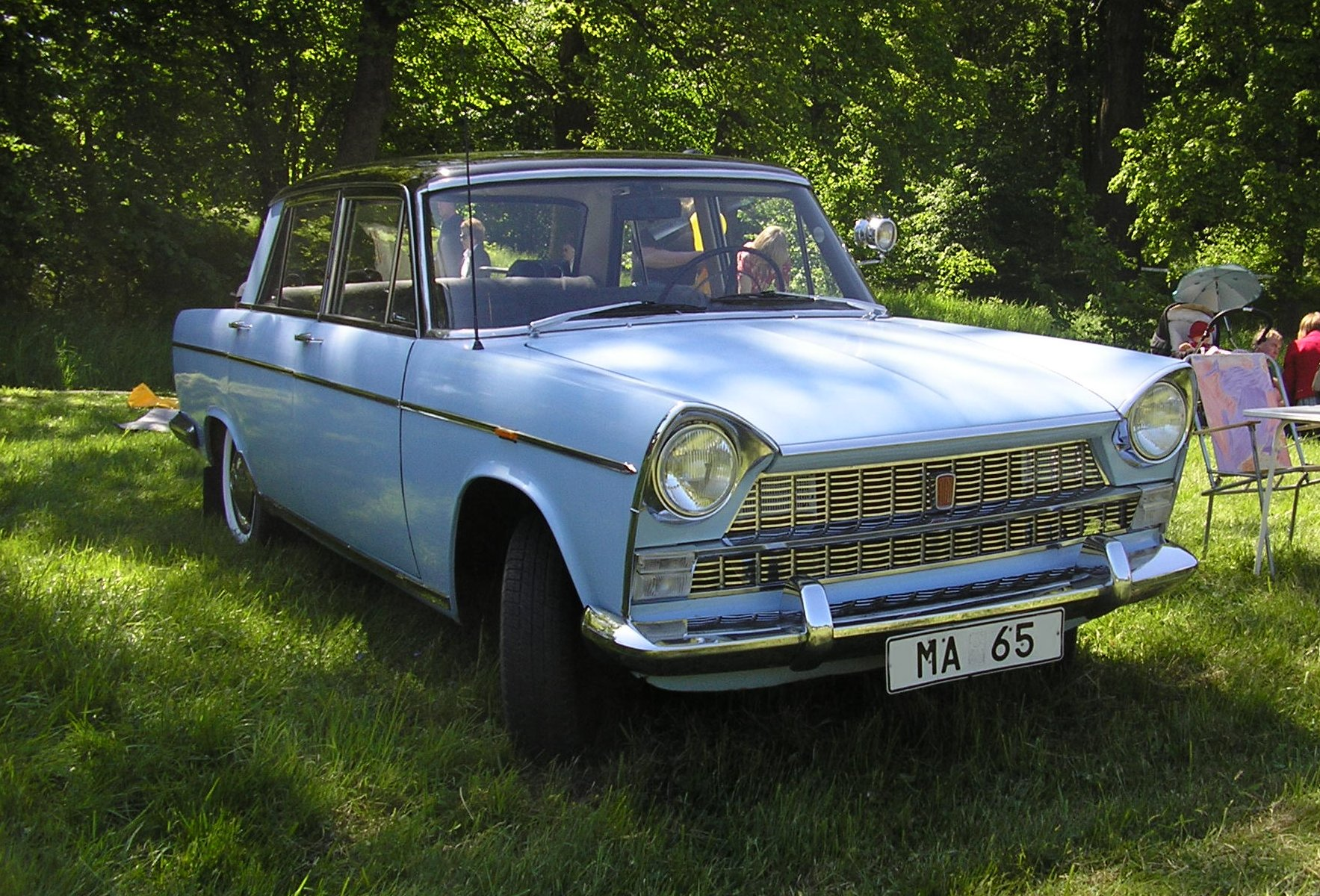
- 1959 Fiat 2100 Berlina

Overview
- Manufacturer: Fiat
- Production: 1959–1968 (Italy); 1960–1962 (Yugoslavia)
- Designer: Dante Giacosa

Body and chassis
- Class: Executive car
- Body style: 4-door saloon 5-door estate
- Layout: Front-engine, rear-wheel-drive
- Related: SEAT 1500

Powertrain
- Engine: petrol: 1500L: 1.5 L I4; 1800: 1.8 L I6; 2100: 2.1 L I6

Dimensions
- Wheelbase: 2,650 mm (104.3 in)
- Length: 4,465 mm (175.8 in); 4,625 mm (182.1 in) (Speciale)
- Width: 1,620 mm (63.8 in)
- Height: 1,470 mm (57.9 in)
- Kerb weight: 1,250–1,350 kg (2,756–2,976 lb)

Chronology
- Predecessor: Fiat 1900
- Successor: Fiat 2300

The Fiat 1800 and 2100 are six-cylinder automobiles produced by Italian manufacturer Fiat between 1959 and 1968. Both models were introduced in 1959. A four-cylinder 1500-cc version, the 1500L, was added to the range in 1963, when the 2100 was replaced by the larger engined 2300. The 1800/2100 were designed by Fiat's own Dante Giacosa.

== Fiat 1800 (1959–1968) ==
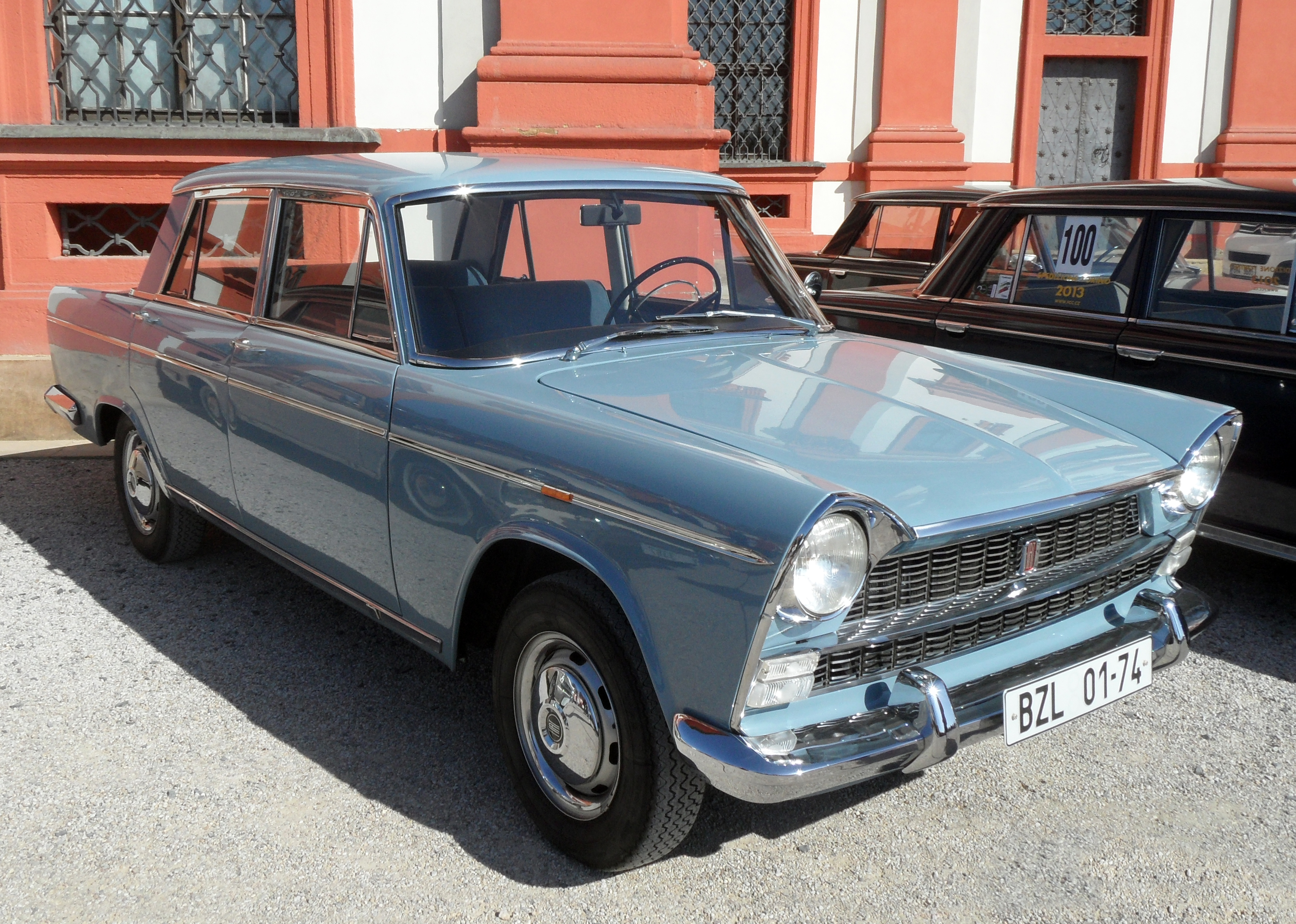
1964 Fiat 1800 B

The Fiat 1800 was introduced as a four-door sedan at the 1959 Geneva Salon. A few months later, the five-door Familiare (Station Wagon) was added to the lineup, one of a very limited number of factory offerings in this class in Europe at the time. The 1800 model had a six-cylinder in-line engine of 1795 cc and a power output of 75 hp (55 kW; 74 bhp) delivered through a 4-speed manual transmission. Its maximum speed was, depending on the version, 137–142 km/h (85–88 mph). This version was replaced in 1961 with the 1800 model B: the engine output was now 86 hp (63 kW; 85 bhp), delivering a top speed of 143 km/h (89 mph) or 146 km/h (91 mph). The 1800 B also benefitted from disc brakes on all four wheels, replacing the four brake drums. Further, an automatic clutch became available.

== Fiat 2100 (1959–1961) ==
The 2100 was a version with a bigger 2054 cc six-cylinder engine. Bore and stroke are 77.0 mm × 73.5 mm (3.03 in × 2.89 in). In autumn 1959, the 2100 Speciale was introduced with a 16 cm (6.3 in) bigger overall length, and a different front grille with horizontal crossbars and twin headlights. It was typically used by diplomats and for other representational purposes. This version received the slightly shorter gearing from the 2100 Familiare and was also meant to receive a more powerful engine. Not many were built, but Carrozzeria Francis Lombardi ended up building a longer stretched version which could seat seven, mainly intended for taxi use – although a limousine version called "President" was also available from Lombardi, mainly purchased by the Italian and Vatican states.

It was Fiat's first large luxury car with a displacement of over 2 litres since the Fiat 2800 of the 1940s. The 2100 was discontinued in Italy during 1961, when the Fiat 2300 became available.

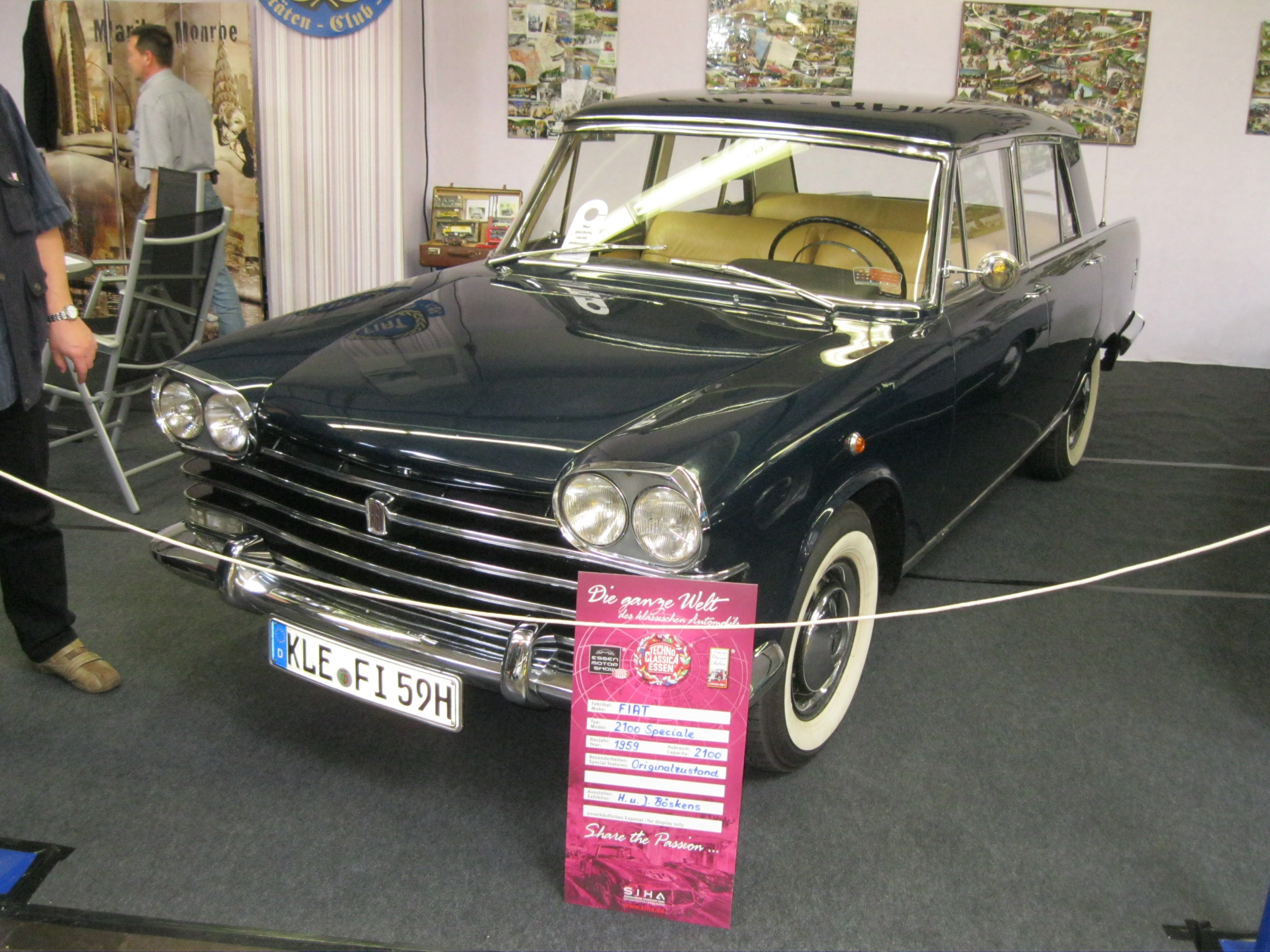
Fiat 2100 Speciale (Europa)

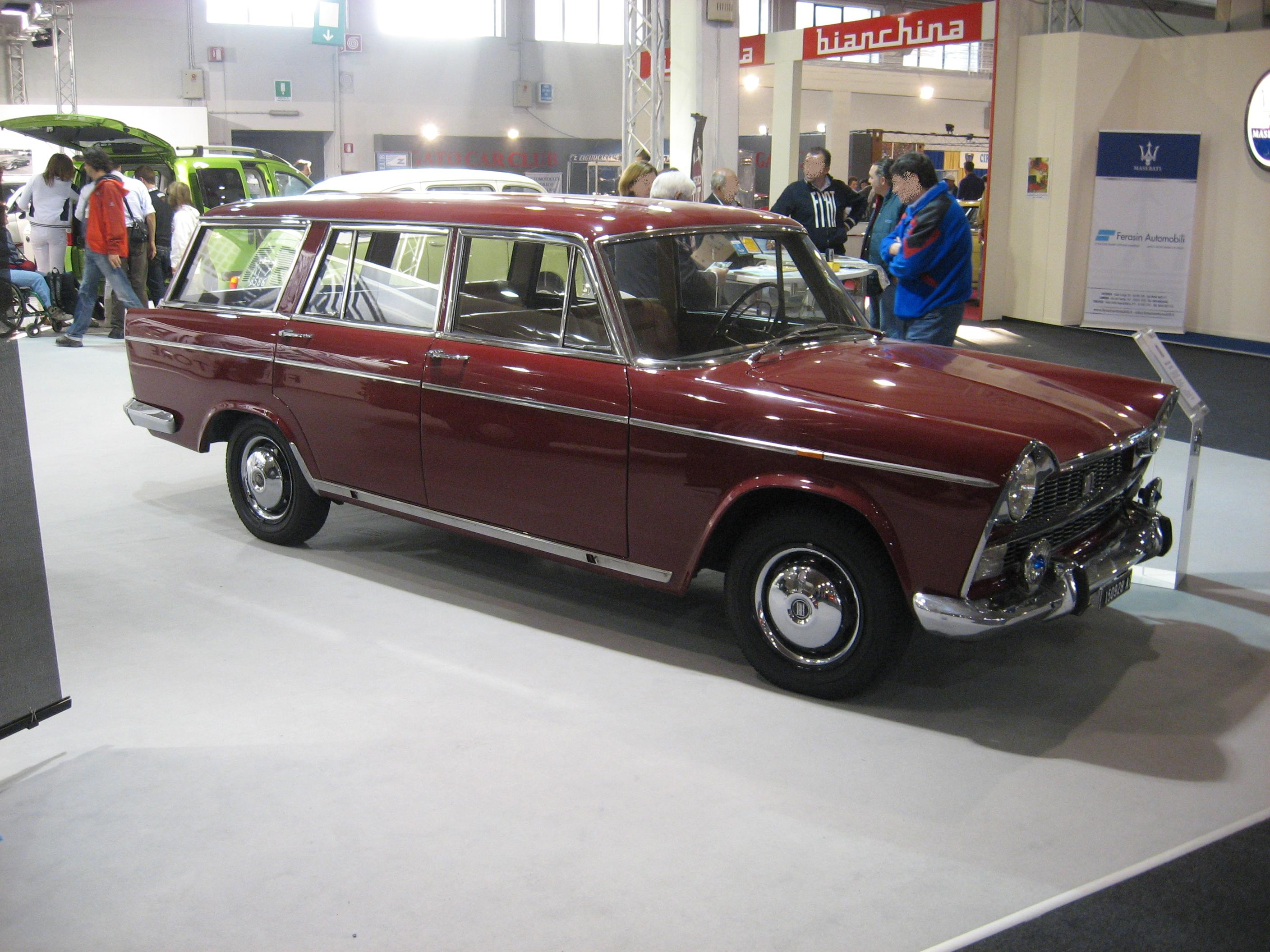
Fiat 2100 Familiare, one of the rare estates

== Fiat 1500L (1963–1968) ==
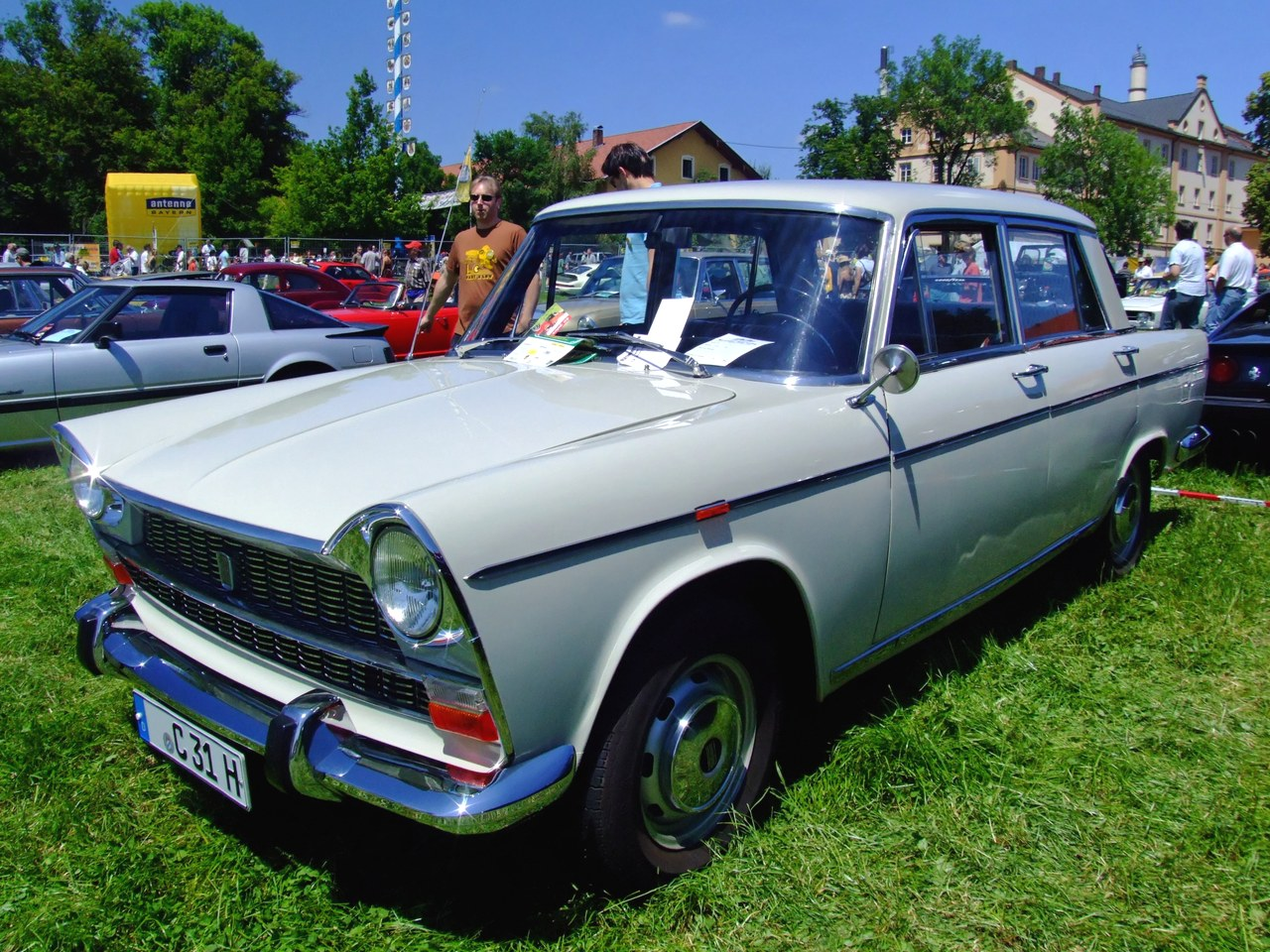
Fiat 1500L

In 1963 Fiat used the body of Fiat 1800/2100 to create a new, less expensive model, the Fiat 1500L. To distinguish it from the 1300/1500 it used the designation 1500L (for 'Lunga, "long"). The car shared its more compact sibling's four-cylinder 1481 cc engine, delivering 72 PS (53 kW; 71 hp), which was increased to 75 PS (55 kW; 74 hp) in 1964 for the second series. The interior of the 1500L was also simplified in comparison with the six-cylinder versions.

A reduced-performance version had already been on offer since 1962, aimed at taxi drivers. This variant was only available in Italy. The 1500 Taxi was equipped with a version of the 1481 cc petrol inline-four engine developing just 60 PS (44 kW; 59 hp): the low power engine permitted the transport of customers in comfort and space at urban speeds, without consuming too much fuel.

This 1500L version was produced also by SEAT in Spain, where no other petrol version of the Fiat 1800/2100 was ever on offer. It was badged simply SEAT 1500, since no equivalent of the smaller Fiat 1500 was produced by SEAT. Nearly 200,000 Seat 1500s were built until 1972.

It is estimated that total production in Italy of the Fiat 1800/2100 range is 150,000.

== Derivatives ==
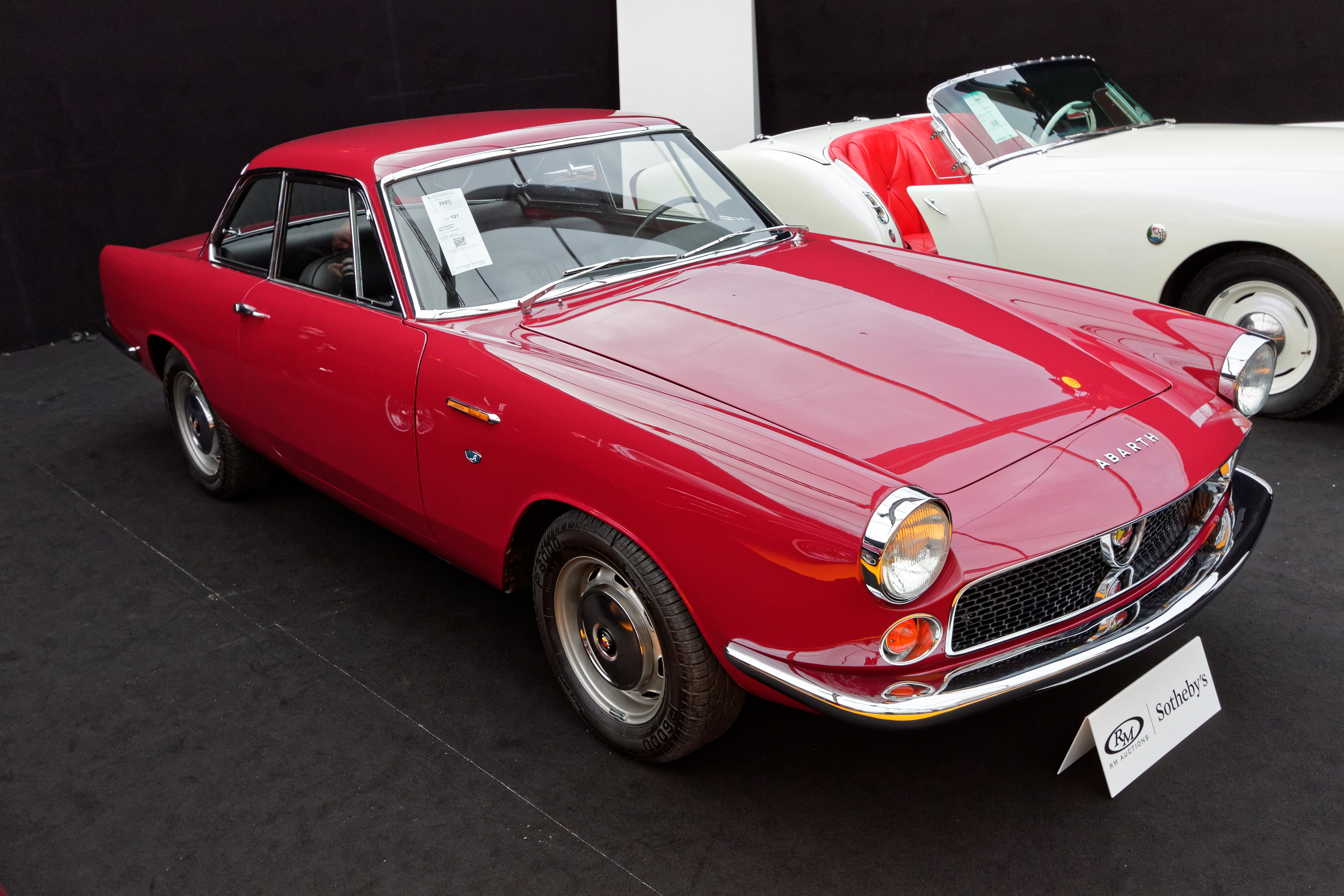
1959 Abarth Fiat 2200 Coupé by Allemano

Abarth also proposed a sportier, 2+2 car based on the 2100. He discussed his plan with Fiat's Vice President Gaudenzio Bono in 1959 and it was arranged to supply Abarth with bare 2100 chassis and drivetrains. The chassis was strengthened and shortened, now on a 2,450 mm (96 in) wheelbase, and was fitted with a bored out and tuned engine with an Abarth exhaust system and Dunlop disc brakes on all four wheels. The bodywork was designed by Giovanni Michelotti and executed by Allemano. The Abarth 2200 was available as a two-door coupé or convertible and was introduced at the Turin Auto Show in October–November 1959. The bore was increased to 79.0 mm (3.11 in), which gave a displacement of 2162 cc. Along with an increased compression ratio and triple Weber 40 DCOE carburettors and higher engine speeds, maximum power increased to 135 hp (99 kW) at 6000 rpm, making for top speeds of 197 and 186 km/h (122 and 116 mph) for the Coupé and Spider respectively. Unlike Fiat's column-shifted original, the Abarth 2200 had the shifter relocated to the floor. As originally presented, the Spider was given a different front end treatment of a rectilinear nature, with twin headlights mounted at an angle. This rather awkward looking arrangement was short-lived; during 1960 Abarth changed it to a single-headlight design similar to that of the Coupé.

The 2200 was fully handbuilt and changes were introduced continuously throughout the production run. The very first coupés are pillarless, unlike cars built after December 1959 which received filigrane B-pillars. Subtle changes took place at the front, while side marker lights were added, and grilles and bumpers were altered several times. Always expensive and from a brand best known for tiny racing machines, the 2200 was only ever built to order and in very small numbers, probably 28 examples. Of these, three examples were built with right-hand drive (two Coupés and one Spider) and delivered in the United Kingdom by Abarth's local concessionaire Tony Crook. At Turin in November 1960 and again at Geneva in March 1961, an updated design by Ezio Ellena was shown. The Ellena design eschewed rear quarter glass in favor of longer doors and a wraparound rear windshield. At the front, a rectangular grille with rounded corners housed two additional driving lights.

In spite of the minuscule sales, Abarth updated their model at Turin 1961 after the 2100 on which it was based was replaced by the 2300, but the resulting Abarth 2400 was even less competitive in light of the appearance of Fiat's own 2300 Coupé.

Fiat went on to offer their own, Ghia-designed coupé of the succeeding 2300. This design was first shown in Turin in November 1960 as the Fiat 2100 S. Thanks to triple carburettors, the tuned engine produced 130 hp (96 kW). The prototype was built by Ghia's OSI subsidiary; by the time production started, Fiat had upgraded the 2100 to become the 2300 and all Ghia Coupés after the initial prototype were thus equipped.

== Engines ==
Model	Years	Engine	Displacement	Power	Fuel system
1800	1959–1961	OHV inline-six	1795 cc	75 PS DIN (55 kW); 85 PS SAE (63 kW) at 5000 rpm	single carburetor
1800B	1961–1968	OHV inline-six	1795 cc	82 PS DIN (60 kW) at 5200 rpm 86 PS CUNA (63 kW) at 5300 rpm 97 PS SAE (71 kW) at 5300 rpm	single carburetor
2100	1959–1961	OHV inline-six	2054 cc	82 PS DIN (60 kW); 95 PS SAE (70 kW) at 5000 rpm	single carburetor
1500 taxi	1962–1968	OHV inline-four	1481 cc	60 PS CUNA (44 kW) at 5200 rpm 66 PS SAE (49 kW) at 5200 rpm	single carburetor
1500L	1963–1964; 1964–1967	OHV inline-four	1481 cc	72 PS DIN (53 kW); 75 PS DIN (55 kW) at 5000 rpm 83 PS SAE (61 kW) at 5200 rpm	single carburetor

Except for the number of cylinders, the inline-six engines were practically identical to the inline-four engines used in the Fiat 1300 and 1500, as well as in the 1500L. Because of the shared design and components, Fiat saved a lot of money and development time.
