= Corman =

Corman may refer to:

== People ==
- Corman (surname)

== Places ==
- Çorman, Kalbajar, Azerbaijan
- Çorman, Lachin, Azerbaijan
- Rural Municipality of Corman Park No. 344, Saskatchewan, Canada
  - Saskatoon/Corman Air Park (airport), Corman Park, Saskatchewan, Canada
- R.J. Corman Railroad/Pennsylvania Lines (railroad tracks), Pennsylvania, USA

== Other uses ==
- The Corman Poe cycle, films connected to Roger Corman and the stories of Edgar Allan Poe
- R.J. Corman Railroad Group
- Corman Common Lisp, a computer programming language

== See also ==
- Çorman (disambiguation)
- Korman (disambiguation)
- Corpsman
