= Karman Line (disambiguation) =

The Kármán line is a conventional definition of the edge of space.

Karman Line or Kármán Line may also refer to:

== Arts, entertainment, media ==
- "The Kármán Line" (music), a 2009 composition by Peter Meechan (composer)
- The Kármán Line (film), a 2014 short film by Oscar Sharp starring Olivia Colman that won best short at the 2014 British Independent Film Awards and nominated at the 2015 BAFTAs
- "The Karman Line" (episode), 2019 season 2 number 5 episode 27 of TV series New Amsterdam
- "The Kármán Line" (episode), 2023 season 3 number 1 episode of TV series The Morning Show
- The Karman Line (comic), a 2023 graphic novel published by Mad Cave Studios
- Karman Line Studio, a film studio and distributor in Thailand; see List of 2024 box office number-one films in Thailand and 4Eve

== Other uses ==
- RSS Karman Line, the fourth New Shepard space capsule from Blue Origin, debuting in 2024

== See also ==
- Von Kármán (disambiguation)
- Karman (disambiguation)
- Theodore von Kármán
- Armstrong line, the altitude where water boils in ambient pressure at human body temperature
