= Quicc! =

Series of electric cars

Quicc! was a concept car and a planned series of electric cars, by DuraCar from Heerlen, Netherlands. Company bankruptcy in 2009 derailed the latter plan, and the concept car design never entered production.

== QUICC! DiVa ==
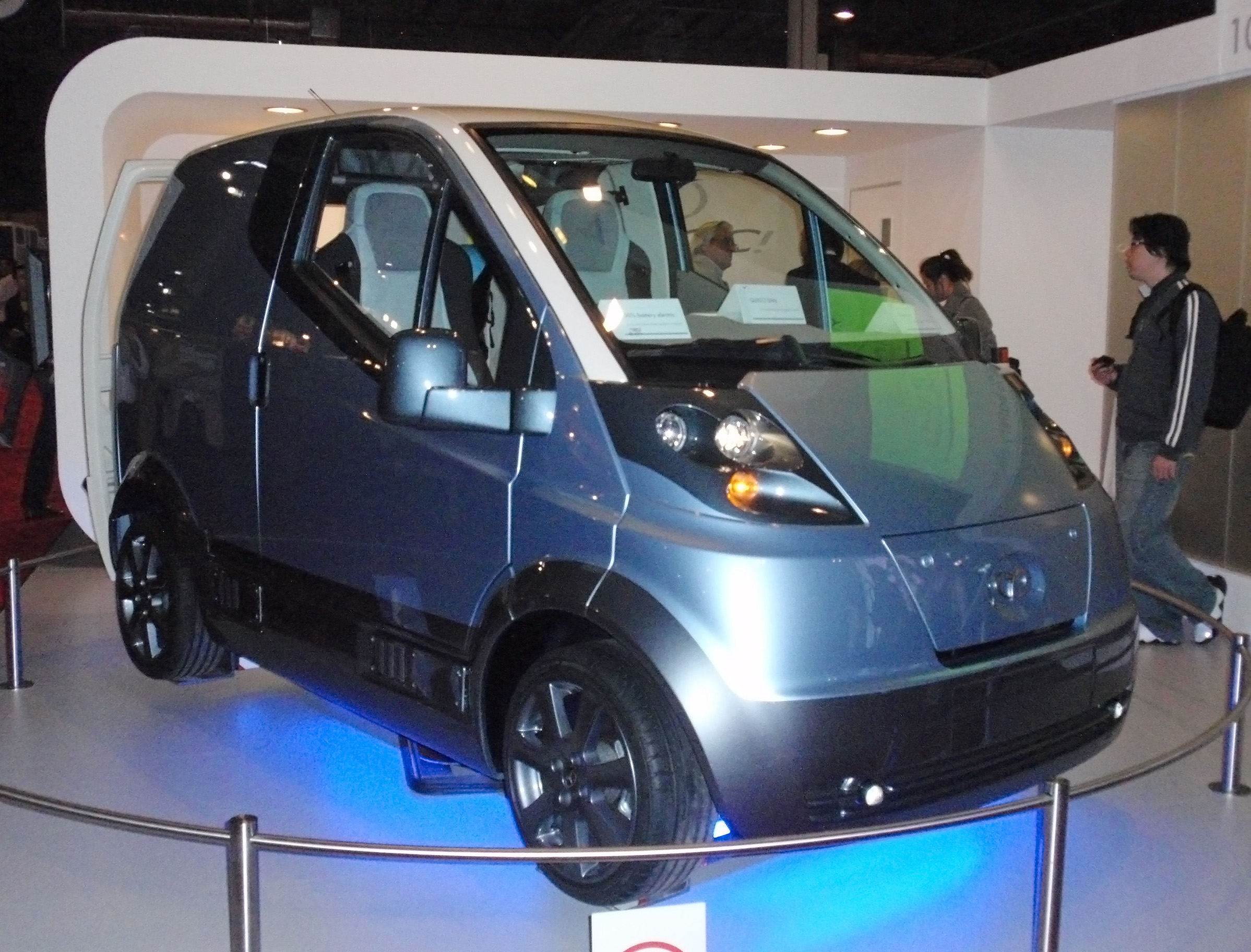
Quicc! DiVa at the 2008 Paris Motor Show

QUICC! DiVa is a city distribution van.

DuraCar had hoped to be producing the QUICC! on different locations in the proximity of its markets. In Germany, it was planned to be manufactured in collaboration with Karmann, but the latter company's bankruptcy in early 2009 left the larger manufacturing project in hiatus.
