= Karmanov =

Karmanov (Russian: Карманов), feminine: Karmanova is a Russian surname. Notable people with the surname include:

- Alexander Karmanov (born 2008), Moldovan ice hockey player
- Pavel Karmanov (1970–2024), Russian composer and rock musician
- Vasily Karmanov (1927–1967), Soviet swimmer

== See also ==
- Karmanov Dvor, rural locality in Vologda Oblast, Russia
- Karman
