= Çorman =

Çorman or Chorman or Churman may refer to:

- Çorman, Kalbajar, Azerbaijan
- Çorman, Lachin, Azerbaijan

== See also ==
- Corman (disambiguation)
- Korman (disambiguation)
