= Von Kármán (disambiguation) =

Theodore von Kármán was a Hungarian-American mathematician, aerospace engineer and physicist.

Von Kármán may also refer to:

- Von Kármán (lunar crater)
- Von Kármán (Martian crater)
- Von Karman Institute for Fluid Dynamics
- Von Kármán ogive
- Von Kármán constant
- von Kármán line
- von Kármán wind turbulence model
- Theodore von Karman Medal

== See also ==
- Born–von Karman boundary condition
- Karman, surname
- Karman (disambiguation)
- Von (disambiguation)
