= Wilhelm Karmann Jr. =

German entrepreneur (1914–1998)

Wilhelm Karmann Jr. (4 December 1914 – 25 October 1998) was a German entrepreneur. He took over the management of Wilhelm Karmann GmbH based in Osnabrück in 1952 and led the company to become a recognized partner of the automotive industry as a contract manufacturer of complete vehicles and as a supplier of pressed parts, production systems and roof modules for convertibles. He was also involved in numerous vehicle developments.

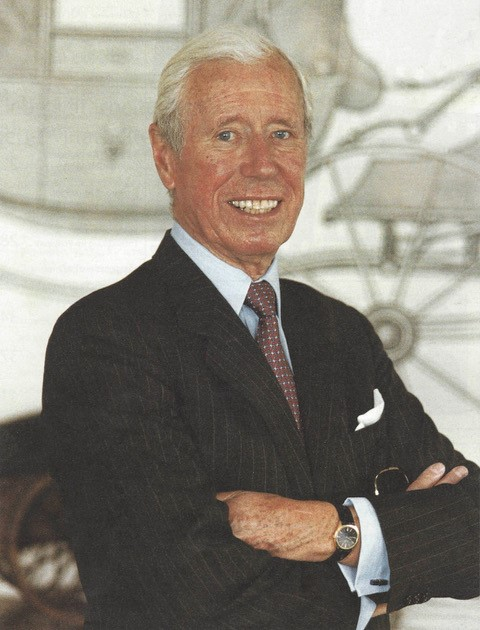
Wilhelm Karmann Jr. (1989)

It was the VW Karmann-Ghia that made the name Karmann known worldwide. In 1955, Karmann presented the coupé version of the VW 1200, designed by Luigi Segre, the owner of the Italian Ghia bodywork plant in Turin, to the General Director of the Volkswagen plant, Heinrich Nordhoff. Volkswagen liked the soft lines of the coupé and this was the beginning of the worldwide success story of the Karmann-Ghia. The love for open cars accompanied Karmann throughout his life; not only the VW Beetle and then the Golf Cabriolet came from Osnabrück, but also convertibles from Audi, Ford and Mercedes as well as a variety of roof systems as component deliveries. A total of around 3 million vehicles rolled off the assembly lines under Karmann's management; not only convertibles and coupes, but also other vehicles produced in small series.

In 1990, Karmann handed over the management of the company to younger hands, but accompanied and steered the company until his death in 1998 in his role as chairman of the shareholders' meeting and honorary chairman of the supervisory board of Wilhelm Karmann GmbH.

== Early life and education ==
Wilhelm Karmann was born in Krefeld, the son and third of the five children of Wilhelm Karmann Sr., who had taken over the respected Osnabrück wagon manufacturing company from Christian Klages on 1 August 1901. Karmann Sr. soon made a name for himself in the still young automotive industry through innovative measures, such as the transition from wooden to semi-steel and then to all-steel bodywork. He also introduced the quick-drying nitro spray paint in 1925. Both were prerequisites for the series production of cars. He also equipped his plant with large presses and began manufacturing his own press tools. In the 1930s, Karmann sr. thus became a pioneer in the German mass production of convertibles and limousines for customers such as the Adler factories in Frankfurt/Main or Hanomag in Hanover.

== Personal life ==
In 1947, during a visit to the island of Borkum, Karmann met Christiane Kemper from Minden, who was on holiday with her brothers on the North Sea island. The Karmann couple married on 24 May 1949 and had three children, Wilhelm-Dietrich (born 1951), Christiane (born 1952) and Stephanie (born 1957).

Karmann was the holder of numerous orders and decorations

- On 29 April 1977, the Federal Republic of Germany awarded him the Grand Cross of Merit of the Order of Merit
- On 10 September 1984 Karmann was awarded the Grand Cross of Merit of the Order of Merit of Lower Saxony.
- On 2 January 1985 the city of Osnabrück awarded him the Justus Möser Medal.
- On 17 December 1993 Karmann was appointed honorary senator at the University of Osnabrück.

Karmann died on 25 October 1998, in Osnabrück.

On the occasion of the 100th birthday of the company founder, Karmann and his co-partners established the Wilhelm Karmann Foundation on 14 February 1971 with initial capital of one million DM. The foundation supported projects at the Museum of Cultural History, the Osnabrück Zoo Society, the Museum of Industrial Culture, the Osnabrück University of Applied Sciences and the University of Osnabrück. The amount of the foundation increased continuously and amounted to about 3.9 million Euro in 2019.

Karmann held honorary positions in numerous professional organisations and business associations. For example, he was Vice-President of the Chamber of Industry and Commerce Osnabrück-Emsland for many years, and also Vice-President of the regional Industrial Employers' Association. He was also involved in the Osnabrück Industrial Club, which was founded by his father and which sees itself as a mediator between industry, politics and society and also serves to promote the exchange of common interests within the Osnabrück business community. Karmann was very interested in the well-being of his employees. All too often, he helped families in socially precarious situations with material resources and money, true to the motto that quick help is double help.

== Life ==
Wilhelm Karmann Jr. joined the company at the age of 19. After an orientation phase, he started an apprenticeship at a Southern German car body company and at Deutsche Fiat. From 1935 to 1937, he studied at the Technische Hochschule in Berlin (now Technische Universität Berlin) for Car Body and Vehicle Construction. Following his exams, he worked as a design engineer in the production-engineering department of Ambi-Budd. At the age of 25, he returned to Osnabrück to work for his own company. In 1941 he was drafted as a soldier, served in Russia, the Netherlands and Italy and only returned from American captivity in Naples in 1945. After World War II, Karmann and his father rebuilt the Karmann factory. When his father died of pneumonia on 28 September 1952, Karmann Jr. assumed overall responsibility.

== Reconstruction and partnership with Volkswagen ==
In 1945, Karmann and his father set about resuming operations with the remaining production resources. For the British Army, for example, more than 100,000 forks and spoons were produced, and Karmann produced 10,000 tin tubs for wheelbarrows for the Harburg Tempo works. More important, however, was cooperation with the Ford Company, with whom Karmann had already worked well before the war. Karmann bundled the remaining stocks of tools still available in East Berlin, restored and modernized them in Osnabrück and delivered them to Cologne. Ford was very satisfied with how Karmann had repaired the tools and commissioned the Osnabrück Company to supply 2,000 sets of pressed parts. This was followed by the first major order. Now Karmann was to supply 800 platform bodies for Ford trucks. And in spring 1946, Karmann was commissioned to produce 1,000 cabs for the Hanomag road tractor.

Karmann and his father sought to build car bodies again. Their company cooperated with the new Auto Union GmbH, on whose order the first prototypes of the all-steel sedan and the 4-seater convertible were delivered from August 1949 on. This order was followed by the production of over 1,000 series vehicles for Auto Union.

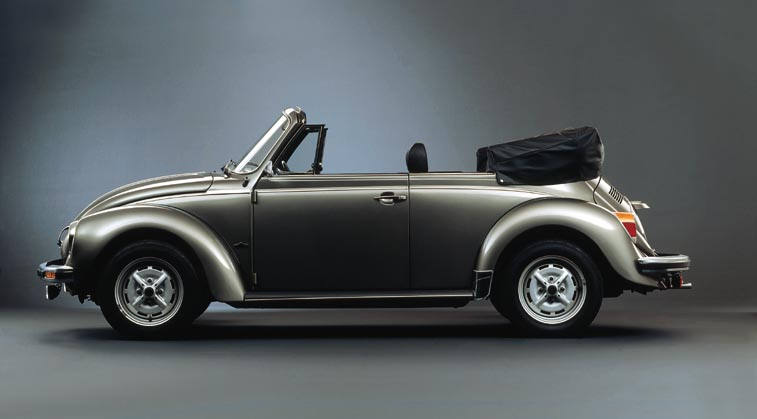
VW Beetle Convertible

At the beginning of 1948, Karmann succeeded in purchasing a Volkswagen saloon, the VW Type 1, which he transformed into a convertible with the help of his father. Together they presented the convertible in Wolfsburg to Heinrich Nordhoff, who had been General Director of Volkswagen Company since 1 January 1948. In May 1949, Karmann delivered 25 Volkswagen Cabriolets to the VW test department. And on 1 August 1949, the time had come: Volkswagen ordered "1,000 four-seater, four-winged Type 15 Cabriolets" from Karmann at a unit price per bodywork of Deutsche Mark 1,900 net ex works. The foundation stone for a lasting partnership with Volkswagen was laid. At that time Karmann employed 642 people; after the death of the company founder and the takeover of the business, the workforce had already grown to over 1,400.

In addition to vehicle construction and the press shop, Karmann committed to the further development of tool making. The production of complicated large tools, with which body parts such as mudguards, roofs or doors were formed from the steel sheets, cost a lot of money and also led to controversial discussions with his father. But Karmann's strategy worked. At the beginning of the 60s, there were only a few car models in Europe for which Karmann had not supplied pressing tools or pressed parts.

== Creation of the Karmann-Ghia ==
One year after taking over his father's bodywork company in Osnabrück, Karmann devised what would become the Karmann-Ghia. Karmann wanted to produce a sporty and open two-seater based on the VW Beetle. Volkswagen, too, was interested in a sporty roadster that would be loved by American soldiers stationed in Europe and would be taken to the USA.

Luigi Segre, the owner of Carrozzeria Ghia in Turin, was included in the plan at the Geneva Motor Show. He got a chassis of a Beetle from Osnabrück and put a self-designed body on the chassis. To Karmann's amazement, Luigi Segre then presented him with not a roadster but a coupé that could also be turned into a roadster at the Paris Motor Show. At an appointment arranged at short notice in Osnabrück on 16 November 1953, VW boss Heinrich Nordhoff liked the coupé with its flowing lines and rounded forms so much that he commissioned the construction of the car on the same day.

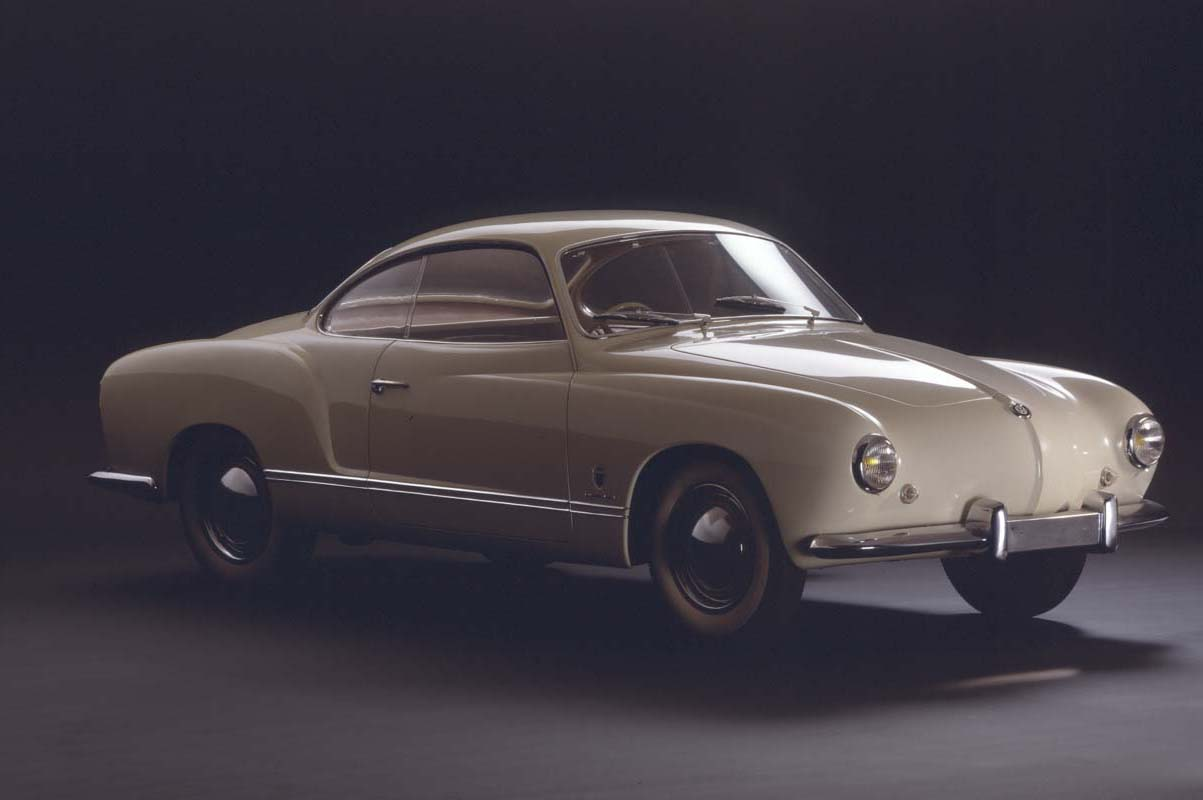
VW Karmann-Ghia

Despite many suggestions, neither Wolfsburg nor Osnabrück had a brilliant idea for what the car would be named. Karmann came up with its name, the Karmann-Ghia. Volkswagen was able to adorn itself with the world-famous name Ghia, and for the bodywork plant in Turin, too, this name was the best reference to Italian design. Throughout the long history of the company the car has carried the name Karmann around the world. On 14 July 1955, Karmann presented the new coupé from Volkswagen in the Casino Hotel of Georgsmarienhütte, the neighbouring city of Osnabrück.

In the first year of production alone, a total of 10,000 coupés were delivered instead of the planned 3,000 units. Johannes Beeskow, who headed technical development from 1956 to 1976, carried out further work on this and many other vehicles at Karmann. The VW Karmann-Ghia became a sales success with more than 362,000 units, even though the performance of the car with only 30 hp and a top speed of 115 km/h did not match the sporty appearance. The Karmann-Ghia convertible followed in 1957 and in 1961 the larger Type 34, the VW Karmann-Ghia Type 34, whose design also came from the Carrozzeria Ghia.

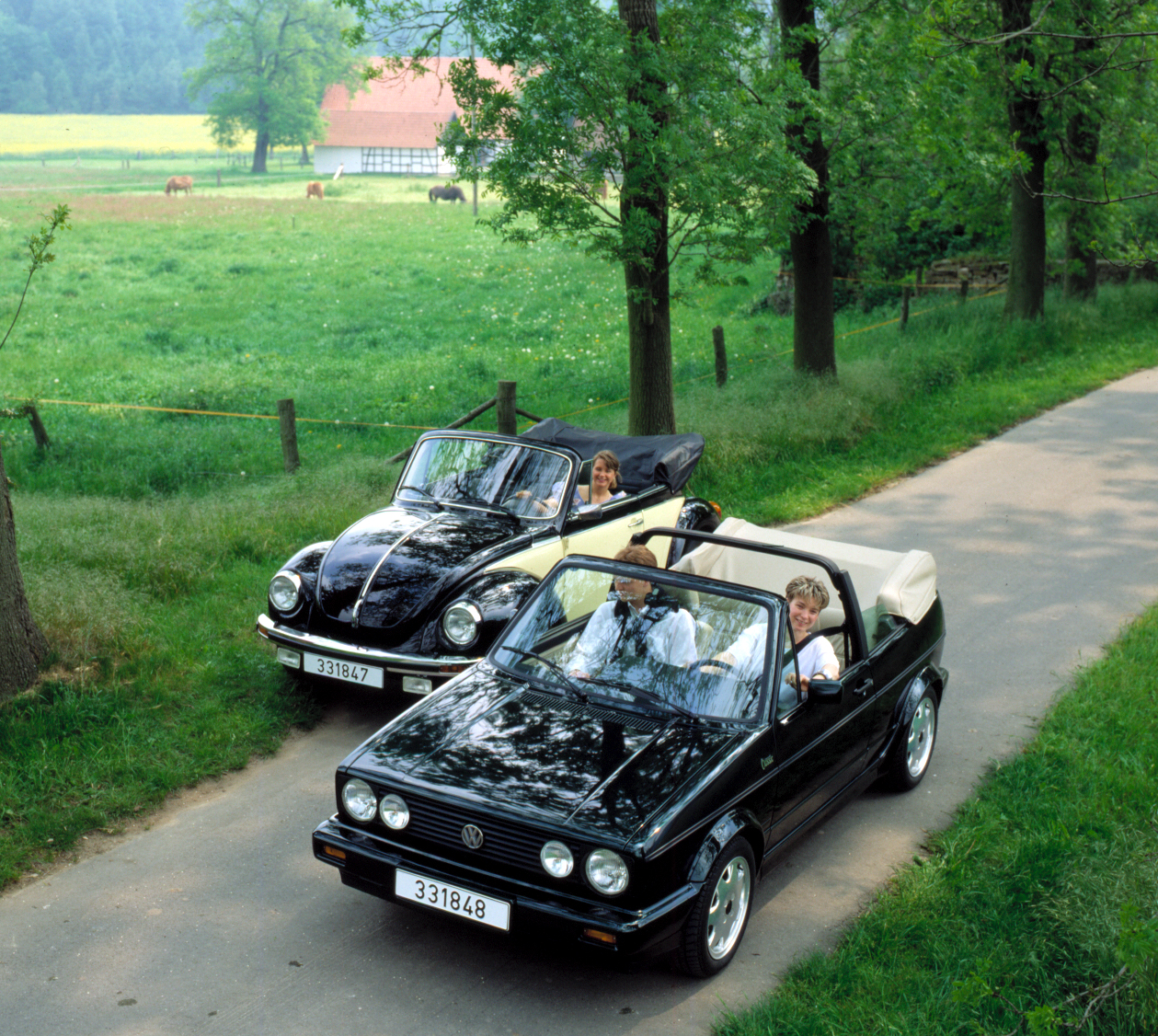
VW Golf Cabriolet and VW Karmann Ghia were built by Karmann

With the Karmann-Ghia, but also with the Beetle Cabriolet, Wilhelm Karmann helped to make the salesrooms of Volkswagen dealers more attractive and appealing. Although both vehicle types were niche products, their appeal led to a boost in sales of the VW Beetle as a mass product.

In terms of numbers produced at Karmann, the Karmann-Ghia Coupés and Cabriolets were later slightly surpassed by both the VW Golf Cabriolet and the VW Scirocco I. If on the other hand, the first Karmann-Ghia types were added together via Coupé and Cabrio, the Karmann-Ghia was Karmann's most successful vehicle.

== Years of growth ==
In addition to the Beetle Cabriolet and the Karmann Ghia, Karmann also produced all the Golf cabriolets and the VW Scirocco and VW Corrado sports coupés for Volkswagen. Karmann built further vehicle plants, in 1960 in São Bernardo do Campo (Brazil) and in 1965 in Rheine. From 1965 onwards, Karmann produced complete vehicles and bodies of the BMW Coupé 2000 C/CS (four-cylinder), later also the larger BMW E9 six-cylinder coupés (2.5 CS, 2.8 CS, 3.0 CS/CSi) at the Rheine plant in Westphalia. From 1976 to the 1980s, Karmann first took over the series production and then the body shell of the BMW 6-series coupé (628 CSi, 633CSi, 635 CSi). All convertible models of the Ford Escort were delivered in Rheine as complete vehicles.

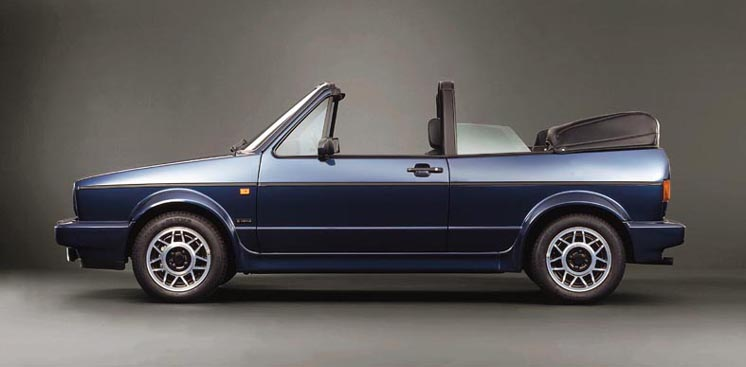
VW Golf Cabriolet

Karmann also produced motorhomes under the name Karmann-Mobil from 1977 onwards. Karmann got the idea for his first motorhome during a trip in South Africa. The first vehicles were built on the basis of a Volkswagen T2, followed by the T3 and LT as well as the Mercedes-Benz T1. Parallel to this, the Postilion 4500 and 5000 caravan models were developed and built in Brazil and launched on the market in 1982. This was followed by many other motorhomes with the type designations Gipsy, Davis and Distance.

A special highlight in Karmann's life was the production anniversary with the Volkswagen plant. On 23 June 1981 the 1.5 millionth car with the Volkswagen emblem produced in Osnabrück left the assembly lines. It was a white Scirocco GTI.

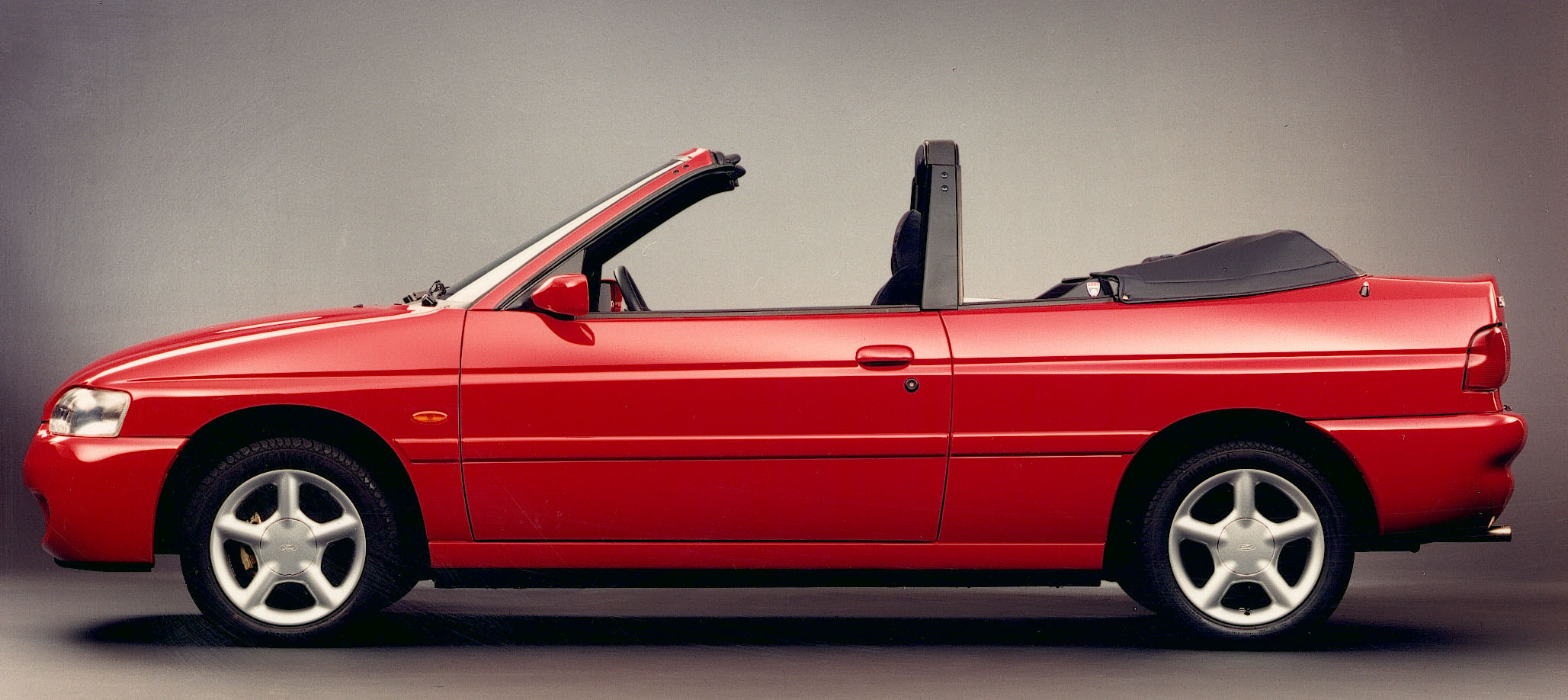
Ford Escort Cabriolet

Karmann was chairman of the Board of Management until his 75th birthday in 1989. That year marked a number of anniversaries. Karmann Rheine had existed for 25 years. The Golf Cabriolet was 10 years old and Karmann could not only look back on 40 years of cooperation with Volkswagen, but also celebrate his company’s 50th year in operation. His successor to the board of management was Rainer Thieme, who previously managed Keiper Recaro, a company that produced seats for the automotive and aircraft industries. After retiring from operational management, Karmann continued to steer the company in his roles as chairman of the shareholders' meeting and as liable general partner of the holding company Wilhelm Karmann KG. When Karmann took over the company in 1952, 1,415 employees generated a turnover of 24 million DM. In 1998, the year of his death, the turnover of the group of companies with about 7,000 employees had increased to over 1.1 billion DM.

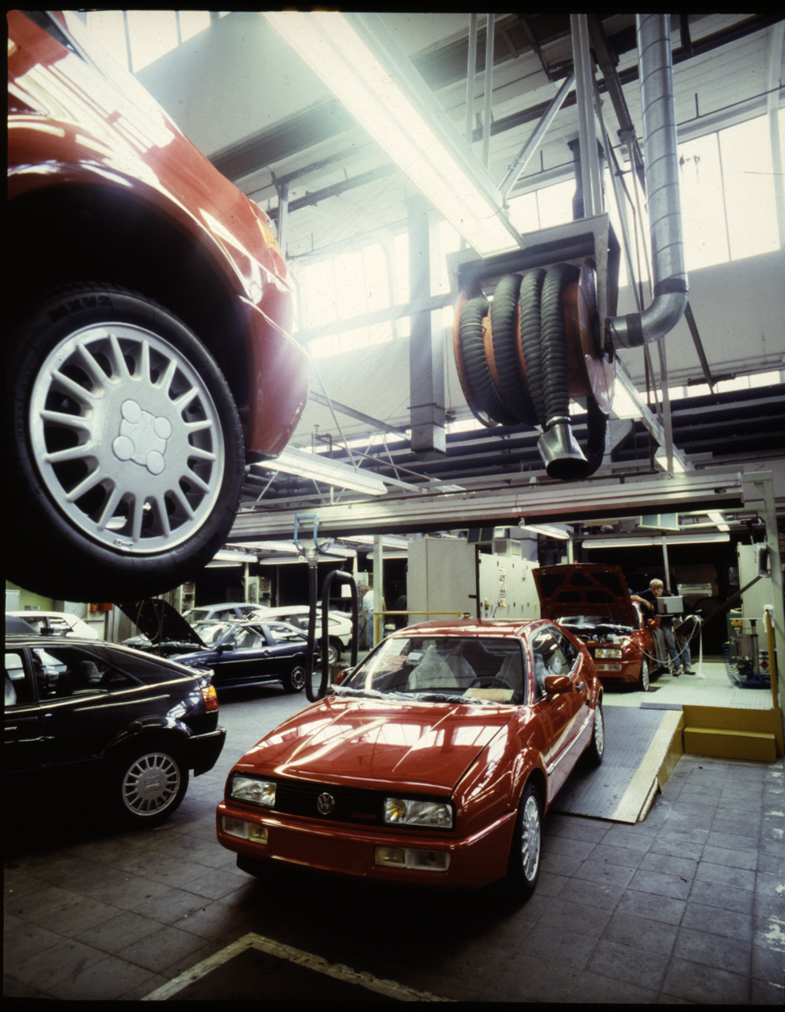
The production of the VW Corrado
