= Korman =

Korman or Kormann may refer to:

== People ==
- Bart Korman (born 1975), American businessman and politician from Missouri
- Edward R. Korman (born 1942), United States district judge
- Gordon Korman (born 1963), Canadian American author
- Hanns Ludwig Kormann (born 1889), German composer and conductor
- Harvey Korman (1927–2008), American comedian
- Jeffrey R. Korman (born 1947), New York politician
- Lindsay Korman, birth name of Lindsay Hartley (born 1978), American singer and actress
- Manuela Kormann (born 1976), Swiss curler
- Maxime Carlot Korman (born 1942), politician from Vanuatu
- Peter Kormann (born 1955), American gymnast

== Places ==
- Korman, Kragujevac, a village near Kragujevac, Serbia
- Korman (Aleksinac), a village near Aleksinac, Serbia
- Korman (Šabac), a village near Šabac, Serbia
- Korman, a village in Sokyriany urban hromada, Chernivtsi Oblast, Ukraine
- Korman Stadium, a football stadium in Port Vila, Vanuatu

== See also ==
- Corman (disambiguation)
- Çorman (disambiguation)
- Karman
