= Karman (disambiguation) =

Karman or Kármán is a Hungarian surname.

Karman or Kármán may also refer to:

- Karman cannula, a type of cannula used in medical procedures
- Karman Holdings, an American corporation
- Kármán line, the conventional definition of the edge of space
- Karman Project, a global fellowship program for space industry leaders

== See also ==
- Carman (disambiguation)
- Kaman (disambiguation)
- Karma (disambiguation)
- Kármán vortex street, in fluid dynamics, a repeating pattern of vortices
- Kármán–Howarth equation, a mathematical equation, used for isotropic turbulence
- Karmann, a former German motor car manufacturer
- Kerman (disambiguation)
