= Corman (surname) =

Corman is a surname. Notable people with the surname include:

- Avery Corman (born 1935), American novelist
- Cid Corman (1924–2004), American poet
- Doyle Corman (1932–2019), American politician
- Jake Corman (born 1964), American politician
- James C. Corman (1920–2000), American politician
- Maddie Corman (born 1970), American actress
- Richard Corman (photographer) (born 1954), American photographer
- Richard J. Corman (1955–2013), American businessman
- Robert De Cormier (1922–2017), American musician
- Roger Corman (1926–2024), American film producer and director
- Sandrine Corman (born 1980), Belgian beauty queen
- Mathias Cormann (born 1970), Australian politician

Fictional characters:

- Kimberly Corman, character from the film Final Destination 2
- Harvey Corman, character from the sitcom Scrubs
