= Karman =

Karman is a surname of multiple origins. It may be a Dutch occupational surname for a carter or an Americanized form of the German surname Karmann.Kármán is a Hungarian-language surname from the word kármány for Turish people from Karaman area. Notable people with the surname include:

- András Kármán (born 1973), Hungarian politician
- Harvey Karman (20th century), inventor of the Karman cannula
- Janice Karman (born 1954), American film producer, record producer, singer, and voice artist
- Josephine de Karman, sister and life-partner of Theodore von Kármán
- József Kármán (1769–1795), sentimentalist Hungarian author
- Tawakkol Karman (born 1979), Yemeni journalist, politician, and human rights activist
- Theodore von Kármán (1881–1963), Hungarian-American engineer and physicist

== See also ==
- Kaman (disambiguation)
- Karmanov
- Korman
