= Korman (Šabac) =

Korman Корман (Serbian)
- Village (Selo)
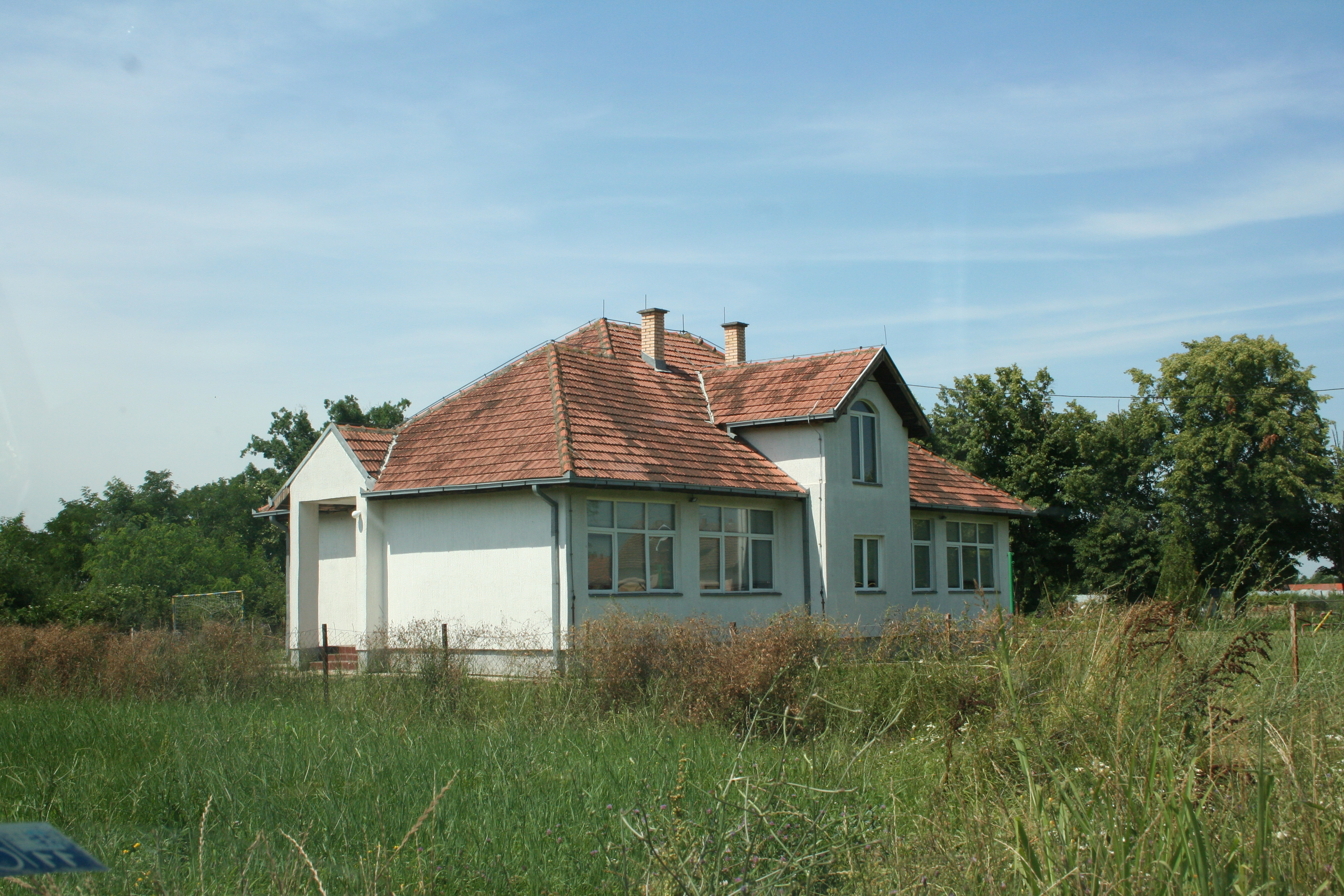

- Location within Serbia
- Coordinates: 44°42′22″N 19°46′11″E
- Country: Serbia
- District: Mačva District
- Municipality: Šabac

Population (2002)
  - Total: 393
- Time zone: UTC+1 (CET)
  - Summer (DST): UTC+2 (CEST)

Korman is a village in the municipality of Šabac, Serbia. According to the 2002 census, the village has a population of 393.
