= Volkswagen Karmann Ghia =

Volkswagen Types 14, 34, and 145
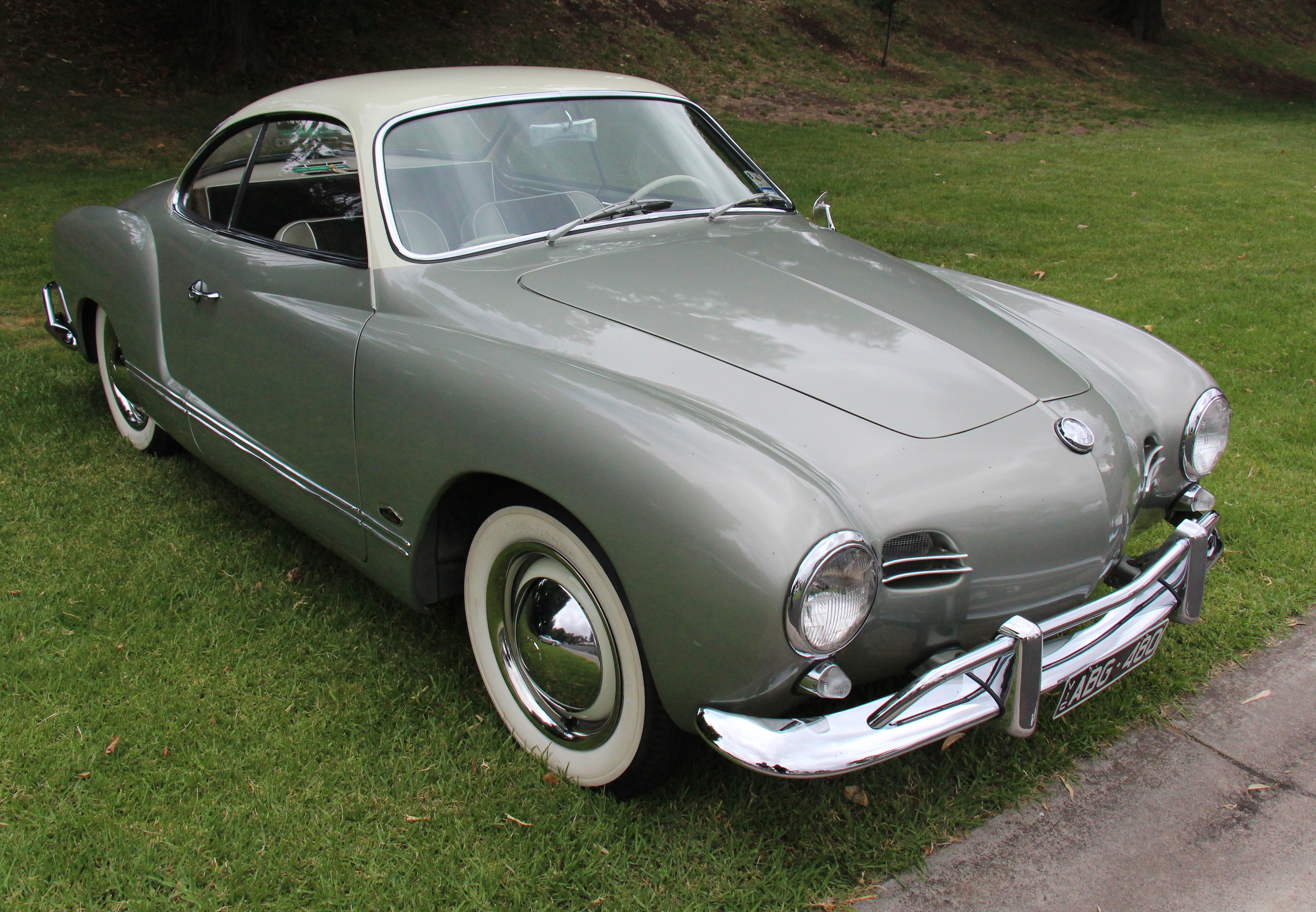
- 1958 Volkswagen Karmann Ghia (Type 14)

Overview
- Manufacturer: Volkswagen
- Production: Germany; Type 14: 1955–1974; Type 34: 1961/1962–1969 445,238 total units built: Coupé: 364,401 (Type 14 and 34); Cabriolet: 80,837 (all Type 14) Brazil; Type 14: 1962–1971; TC (Touring Coupé): 1972–1975 41,689 total units built: Coupé: 23,393; Cabriolet: 177; TC (Touring Coupé): 18,119
- Assembly: West Germany: Osnabrück; Brazil: São Bernardo do Campo (Volkswagen do Brasil)
- Designer: Carrozzeria Ghia: Luigi Segre and Felice Mario Boano and others; 1972 update by Sergio Sartorelli

Body and chassis
- Class: Sports car (S)
- Body style: 2-door convertible 2-door coupé
- Layout: RR layout
- Related: Volkswagen Beetle; Volkswagen Type 3 Puma GT

Powertrain
- Engine: 1200 cc, 1300 cc, 1500 cc, or 1600 cc flat-4

Chronology
- Successor: Porsche 914; Volkswagen Scirocco; Volkswagen SP2

The Volkswagen Karmann Ghia are a family of three overlapping sports car models produced by Volkswagen, marketed in 2+2 coupe (1955–1975) and 2+2 convertible (1957–1975) body styles, though German production ended one year before that in Brazil. Internally designated the Type 14 (1955–1975), the Type 34 (1962–1969), and the Type 145 TC (1972–1975; Brazil), the Karmann Ghia cars combined the floorpans and mechanicals of the Type 1 / Beetle or Type 3 'ponton' models with styling by Italy's Carrozzeria Ghia, and hand-built bodywork by German coachbuilding house Karmann.

The 1955 Type 14 Karmann Ghia was just the second Volkswagen passenger car ever produced, after the Beetle, and launched six years before the Type 3 notchbacks, fastbacks and Variants (squarebacks). They were faster and more expensive than the Beetle, but very cramped in the back, despite their wider, postwar and nearly slabsided body design. Two years later, in 1957, a convertible was added.

In 1961, the Karmann Ghia briefly lost its title of fastest Volkswagen, upon launch of the more powerful 1500cc Type 3 models, but later that year, Volkswagen, Ghia, and Karmann presented an all new Karmann Ghia – Type 34, using the Type 3's floorpan and 1500cc powertrain. Made from 1962 to 1969, this had both new, more modern, angular and roomier bodywork; and a new, more luxurious interior, making it substantially more expensive than all other VW passenger cars. Additionally, the Type 34 was one of the world's first cars with a power operated steel sunroof option. The Type 34 Karmann Ghia thus became VW's range-topper again – costing up to twice the price of a Beetle – while the cheaper Type 14 remained in production. Only the latter offered a convertible.

Failure to offer the Type 34 in the United States – the Karmann Ghia's most important market – combined with high pricing elsewhere likely contributed to limited sales, and after the type 14 also received the 1500cc engine in 1967, production of Type 34s was ended during 1969. Volkswagen of Brazil nevertheless looked for an alternative in its market segment, and so Carrozzeria Ghia was again commissioned, to design a third Karmann Ghia model, for the South American market, the Karmann Ghia TC (Touring Coupé), made in Brazil from 1972–1975. The result was a stylish, rakish fastback that offered good interior space for a 2+2 car.

For its final model year, the vestigial rear seat in the Type 14 was discontinued for North American models, as it lacked provisions for seat belts; all Karmann Ghias for 1974 were marketed strictly as two-seaters.

More than 445,000 Karmann Ghias were produced in Germany over the car's production life, not including the Type 34 variant. Volkswagen do Brasil (Volkswagen Brasil) produced 41,600 Type 34s in Brazil for South America between 1962 and 1975.

Long noted for its exterior styling, the Karmann Ghia was designed with input from numerous individuals at Carrozzeria Ghia and was strongly influenced by Virgil Exner's work, though all of its designers passed without a definitive individual styling attribution.

== History ==
Three companies and numerous individuals came together in the history of the Karmann Ghia. In the early 1950s, Volkswagen was producing its Volkswagen Beetle, and as postwar standards of living increased, executives at Volkswagen were at least receptive to adding a halo model to its range, if not actively seeking an additional model. Luigi Segre was committed to expanding the international reputation of Carrozzeria Ghia, and Wilhelm Karmann had taken over his family coachbuilding firm Karmann and was eager to augment his contracts building Volkswagen's convertible models.

Wilhelm Karmann and Luigi Segre often encountered each other at international automobile shows, and after an initial discussion prompted by Wilhelm Karmann, Segre secretly obtained a Volkswagen Beetle to use as a basis for a prototype – Beetles were difficult to come by and Gian Paolo, Mario Boano's son, purchased one in Paris and drove it back to Turin. Ghia customized its platform, designed the initial prototype and in five months constructed the model. Segre secretly presented the model to Wilhelm Karmann one year after the initial discussion – late in 1953, in Paris, at the Societé France Motors factories (Volkswagen's dealership for France and the exclusive European dealer of Ghia-built Chrysler models). When Wilhelm Karmann saw the coupé, Karmann said, "I'd like to build that!" As the head of Ghia, Segre singularly directed the project through conception and prototyping, delivering a feasible project that Willhelm Karmann both wanted to and could practically build – the project Wilhelm Karmann would in turn present to Volkswagen.

The styling of the vehicle, however, integrated work by Segre as well as Mario Boano, Sergio Coggiola and Giovanni Savonuzzi – and at various times they each took credit for the design. Furthermore, the design bore striking styling similarities to Virgil Exner's Chrysler D'Elegance and K-310 concepts, which Ghia had been tasked with prototyping – and which in turn reflected numerous cues and themes developed previously by Mario Boano. According to Virgil Exner's son, Virgil M. Exner Jr., Giovanni Savonuzzi was tasked with scaling down the full-sized d’Elegance, replacing "the Chrysler’s egg-crate grille with a gentle, boat-like prow. Exner Jr. is further quoted as saying that the Karmann Ghia "was a direct, intentional swipe off the Chrysler D'Elegance. Giovanni Savonuzzi was the engineer and designer who downsized the D'Elegance and made the Karmann Ghia out of it. Nobody minded it. It was wonderful."

The precise styling responsibilities were not well-documented at the time, before the passing of the various designers, further complicated by the overlapping work of the key players. A definitive individual attribution on Karmann Ghia's styling was never made.

Segre and Virgil Exner became close professionally and personally, eventually traveling Europe together. Peter Grist wrote in his 2007 Exner biography that when Exner in 1955 eventually saw the Karmann Ghia, which cribbed heavily from his Chrysler d'Elegance, "he was pleased with the outcome and glad that one of his designs had made it into large-scale production." Chris Voss, a stylist in Exner's office, reported in 1993, that Exner considered the Karmann Ghia the ultimate form of flattery. Segre in turn sent Exner the first production Karmann Ghia imported into the state of Michigan, in gratitude.

After Volkswagen approved the design in November 1953, the Karmann Ghia debuted (at the 1955 Frankfurt auto show and at the Kasino Hotel in Westphalia, Germany, on July 14, 1955) and went into production, first at Ghia and then in Osnabrück – ultimately to reach a production over 445,000, running 19 years virtually unchanged.

Gallery

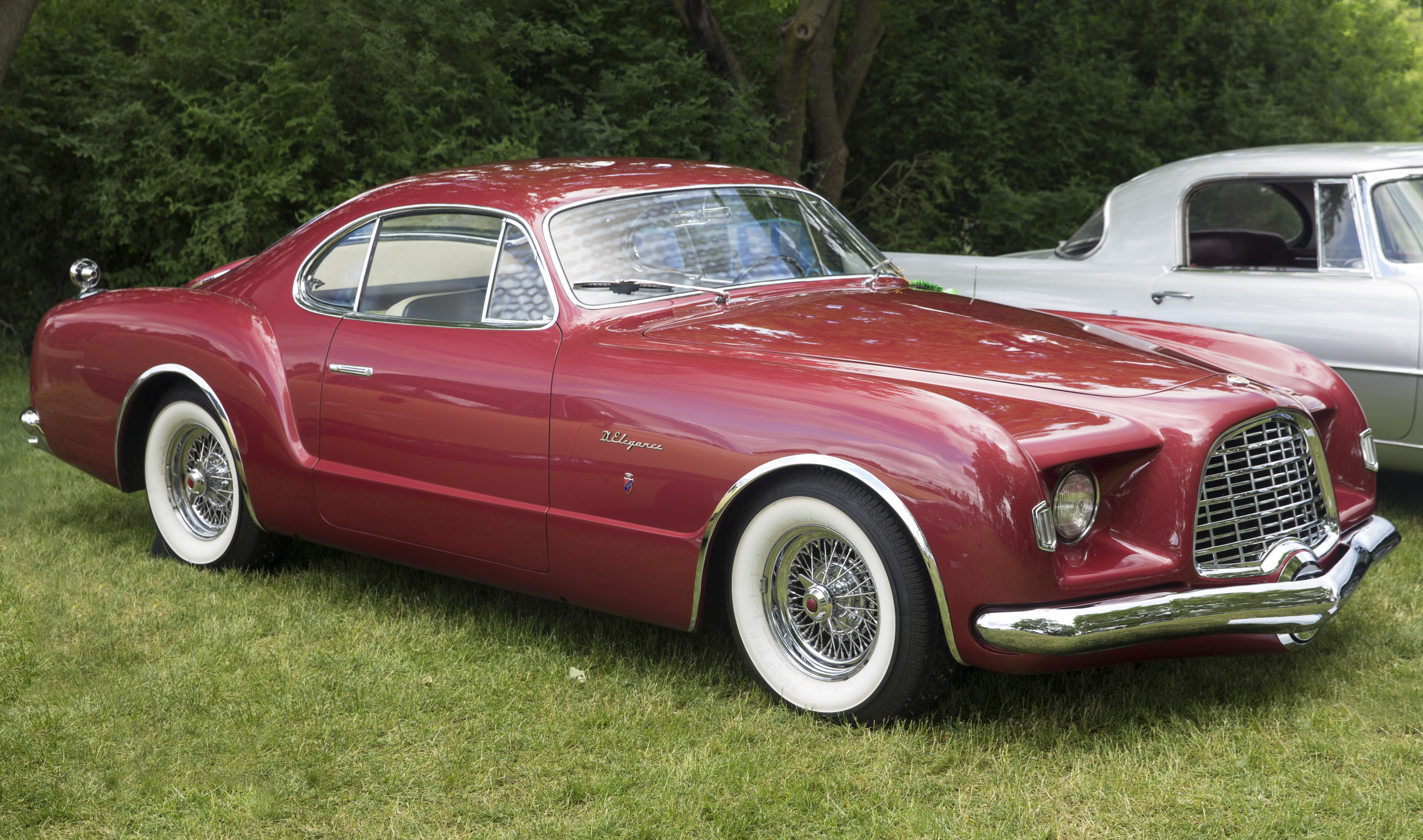
The Chrysler D'Elegance, which inspired the Karmann-Ghia

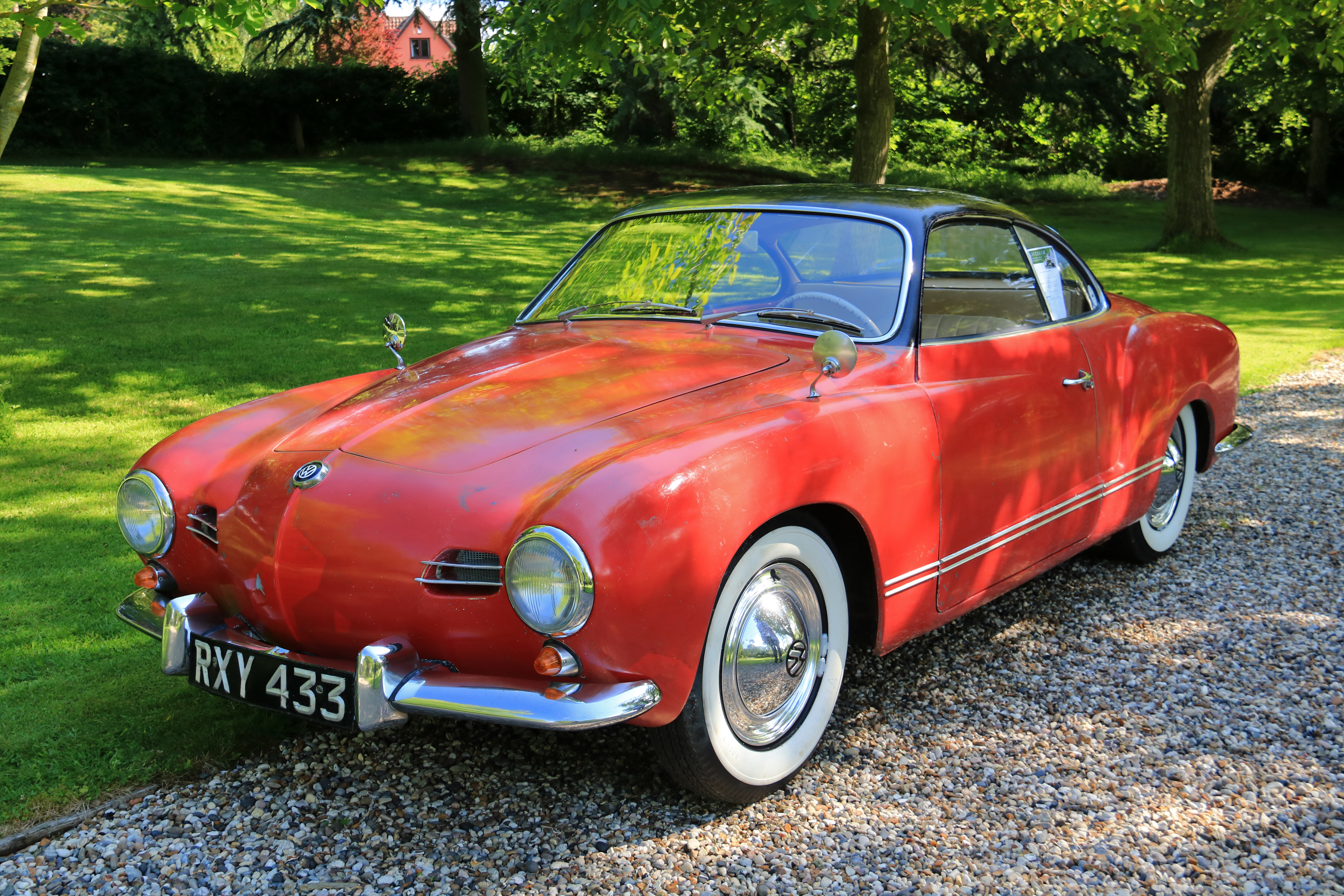
1955 Volkswagen Karmann Ghia (Type 14)

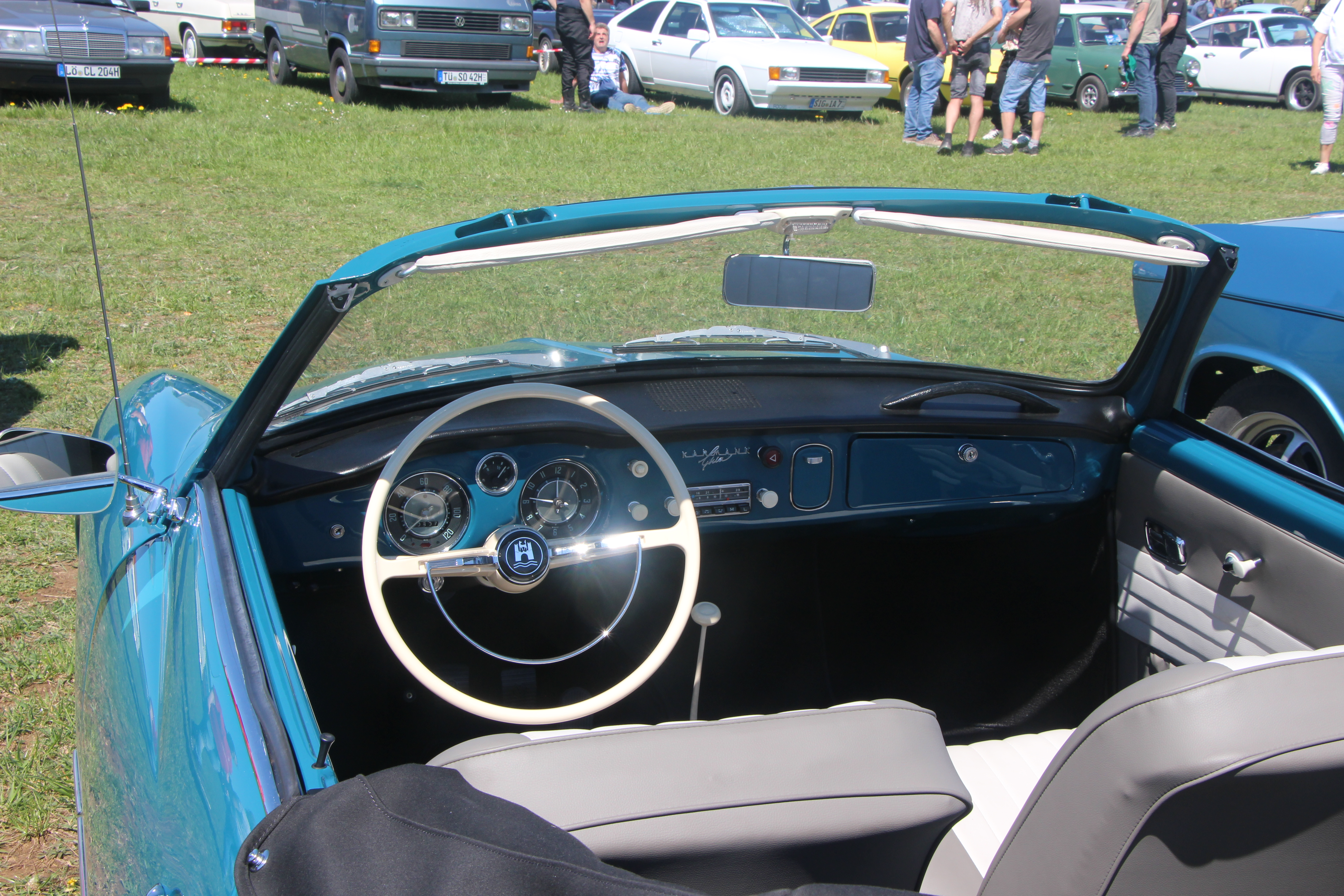
Karmann Ghia Cabriolet interior

== Production ==
The design and prototype were well received by Volkswagen executives, and the Type 14 debuted at the October 1953 Paris Auto Show as a styling concept "by Ghia." In August 1955 the first Type 14 was manufactured in Osnabrück, Germany. Public reaction to the Type 14 exceeded expectations, and more than 10,000 were sold in the first year.

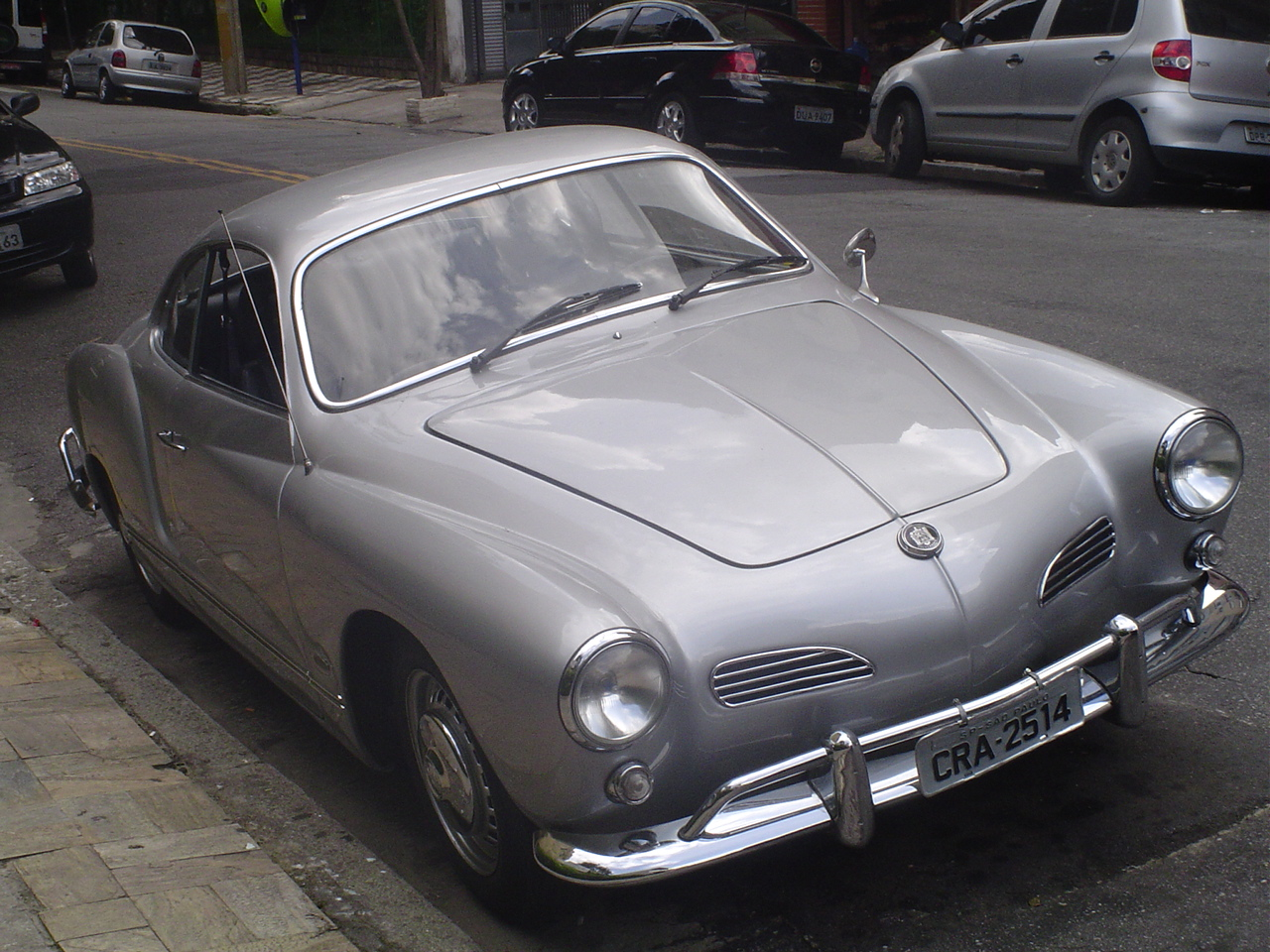
Brazilian-built Karmann Ghia

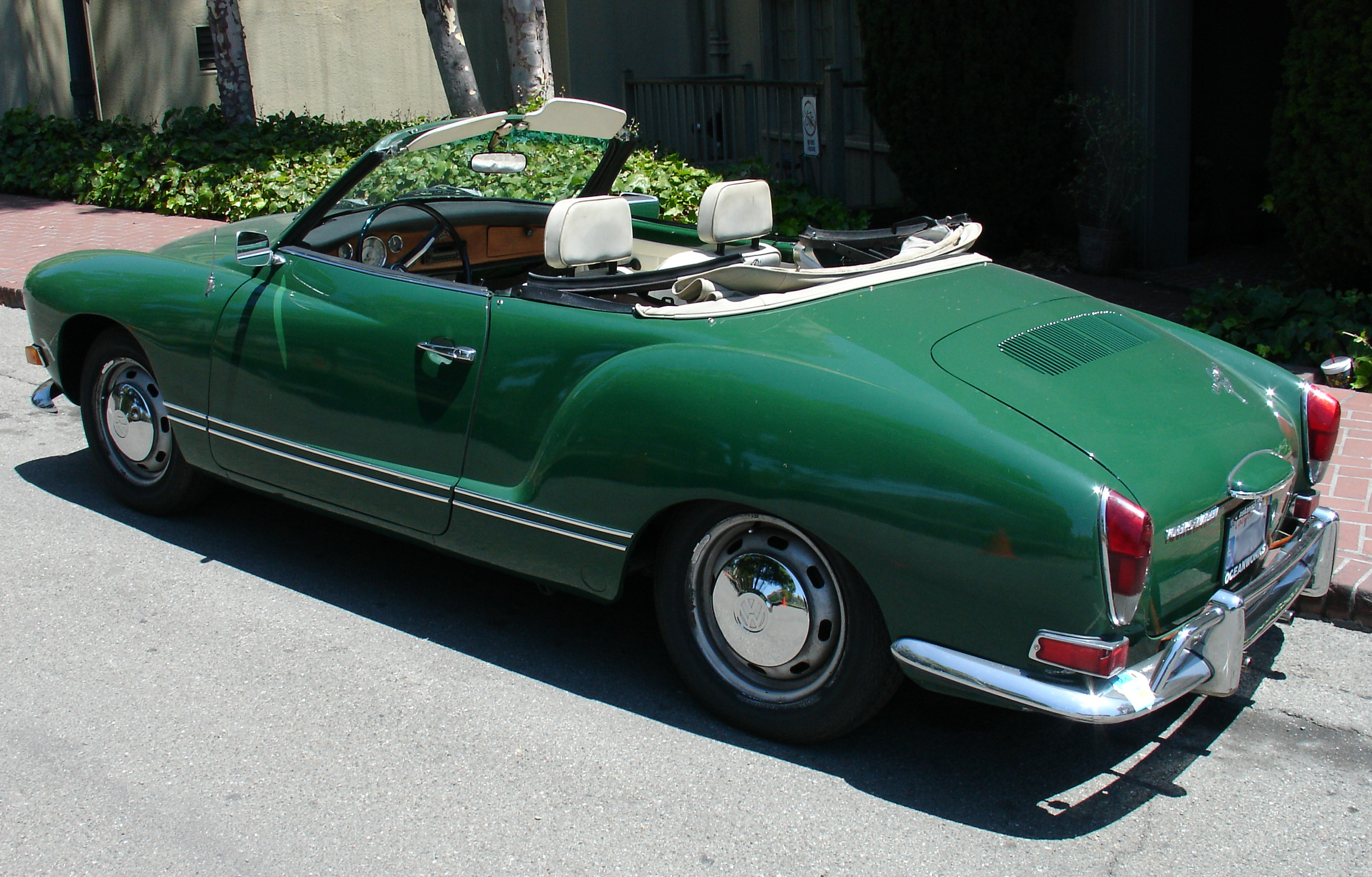
VW Karmann-Ghia Cabriolet

In contrast to the Beetle's machine-welded body with bolt-on fenders, the Karmann Ghia's body panels were butt-welded, hand-shaped, and smoothed with English pewter in a time-consuming process commensurate with higher-end manufacturers, resulting in the Karmann Ghia's higher price.

The Type 14 was marketed as a practical and stylish 2+2 rather than as a true sports car. As they shared engines, the Type 14's engine displacement grew concurrently with the Type 1 (Beetle), ultimately arriving at a displacement of 1584 cc, producing 61 PS (45 kW; 60 hp).

Production doubled soon after the Karmann Ghia's U.S. introduction, becoming the car most imported into the U.S.

In August 1957, Volkswagen introduced a convertible version of the Karmann Ghia. Exterior changes in 1961 included wider and finned front grilles, taller and more rounded rear taillights and headlights relocated to a higher position – with previous models and their lower headlight placement called lowlights. The Italian designer Sergio Sartorelli, designer of Type 34, oversaw the various restylings of Type 14.

In 1970, larger taillights integrated the reversing lights and larger wrap-around turn signals. Still larger and wider taillights increased side visibility. In 1972, large square-section bumpers replaced the smooth round originals, and tail lights were again enlarged. For the USA model only, 1973 modifications mandated by the National Highway Traffic Safety Administration (NHTSA) included energy-absorbing bumpers. A carpeted package shelf replaced the rear seat.

In late 1974, the car was superseded by the Golf-based Scirocco.

Karmann Ghia (1963)
| Engine | Displacement | Power | Torque | Wheelbase | L × W × H (m) | Weight | Top speed | 0→100 km/h (0-62 mph) | Fuel cap. |
|---|---|---|---|---|---|---|---|---|---|
| OHV four-stroke air-cooled flat 4 "Volkswagen", single Solex 28 PICT carburettor | 1,192 cc (77 × 64 mm) | 34 PS (25 kW; 34 hp) at 3,600 rpm | 8.4 kg⋅m (82.4 N⋅m; 60.8 lb⋅ft) at 2,000 rpm | 2,400 mm (94.5 in) | 4.14 × 1.63 × 1.33 | 820 kg (1,808 lb) | 120 km/h (75 mph) | | |
| OHV four-stroke air-cooled flat 4 "Volkswagen", Modified with double Solex 32 PBIC carburettor and OKRASA long-stroke crankshaft. | 1,295 cc (77 × 69.5 mm) | 50 PS (37 kW; 49 hp) at 4,200 rpm | 9.6 kg⋅m (94.1 N⋅m; 69.4 lb⋅ft) at 2,800 rpm | 2,400 mm (94.5 in) | 4.14 × 1.63 × 1.33 | 820 kg (1,808 lb) | 150 km/h (93 mph) | | |

Karmann-Ghia taillight comparison

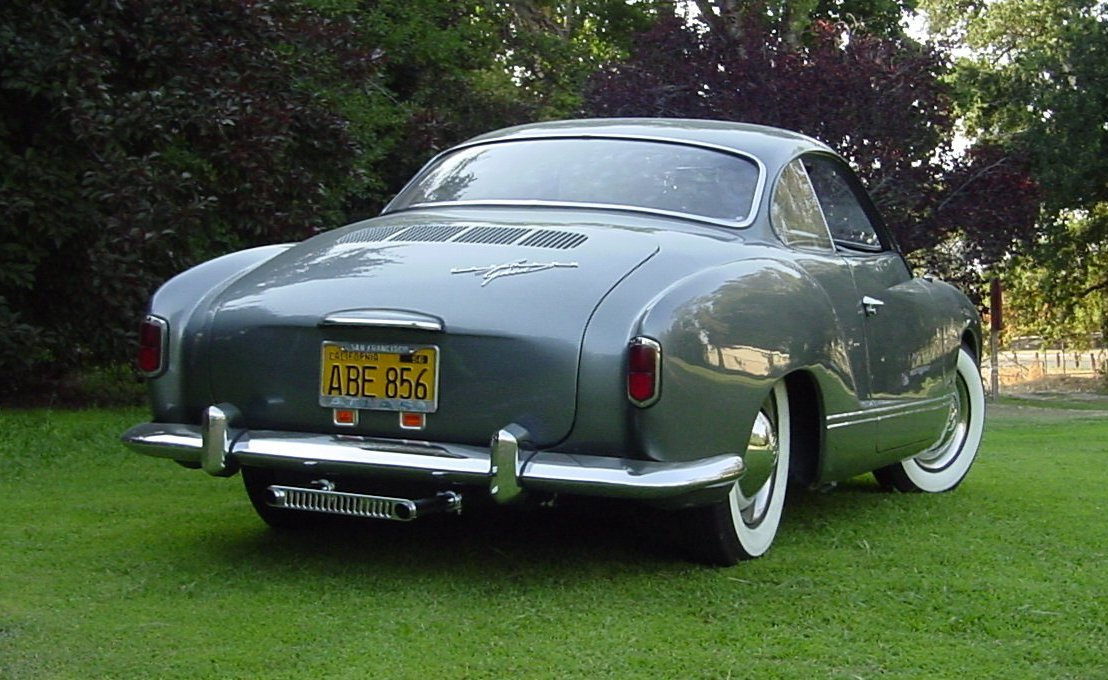
Tail lights (1955–1959)

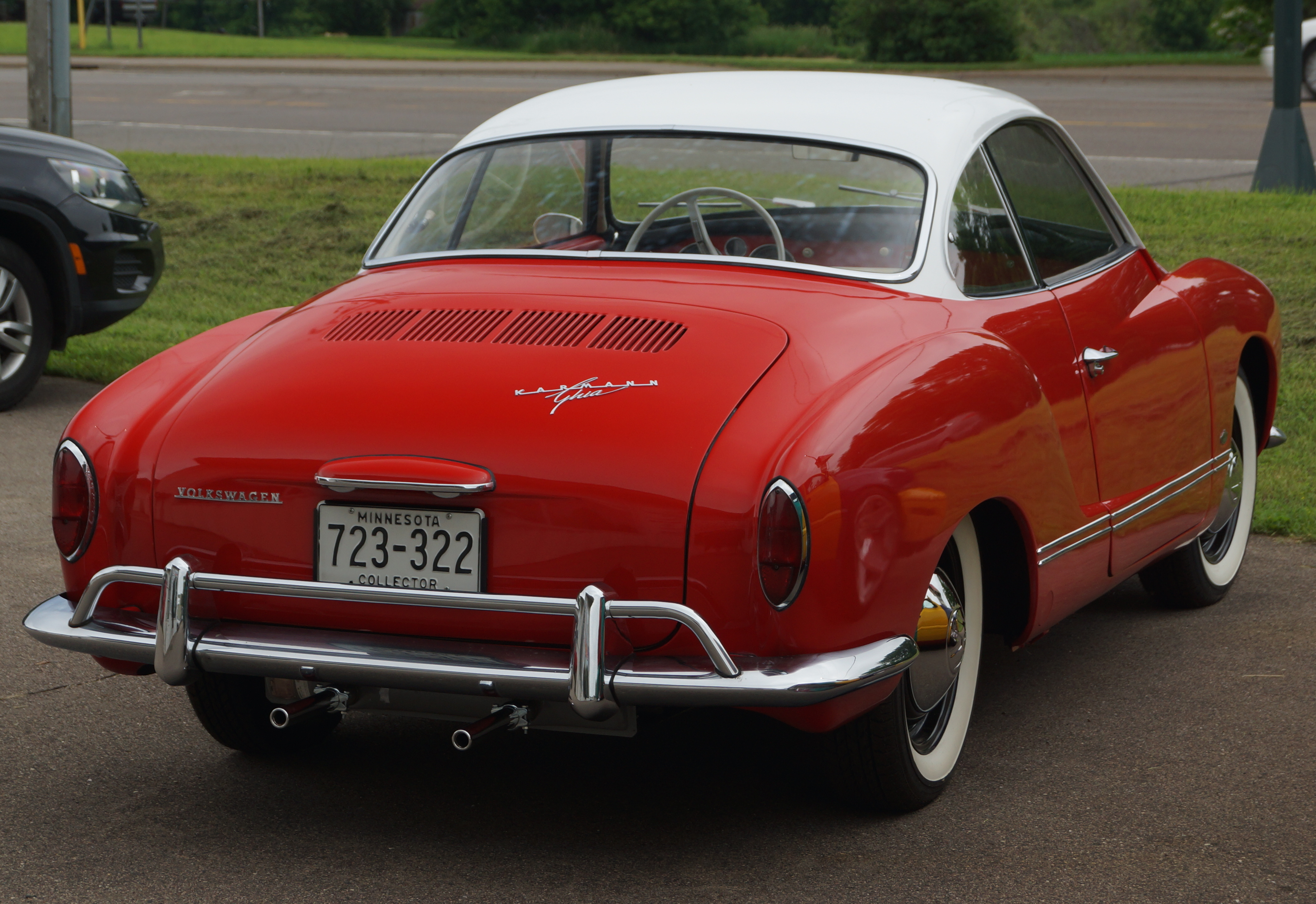
Tail lights (1960–1969)

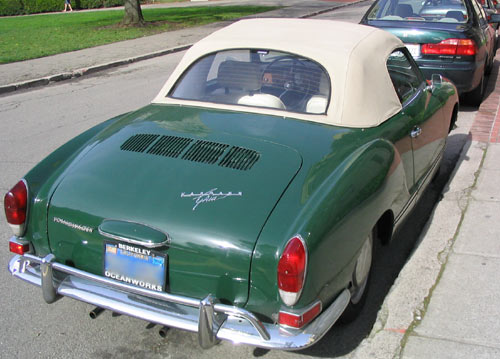
Tail lights US-spec all red (1970–1971)

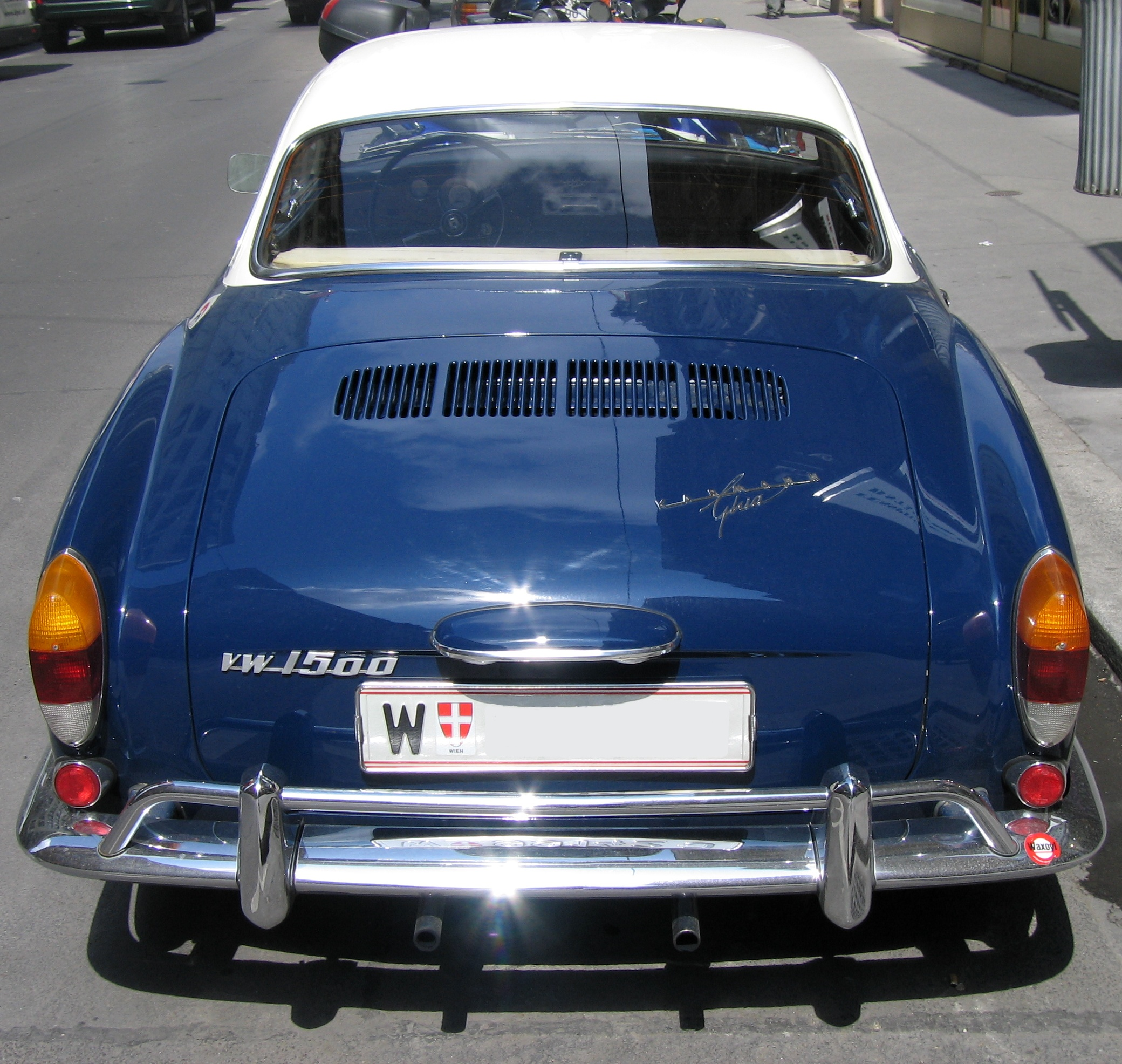
Tail lights Euro-spec red and amber (1970–1971)

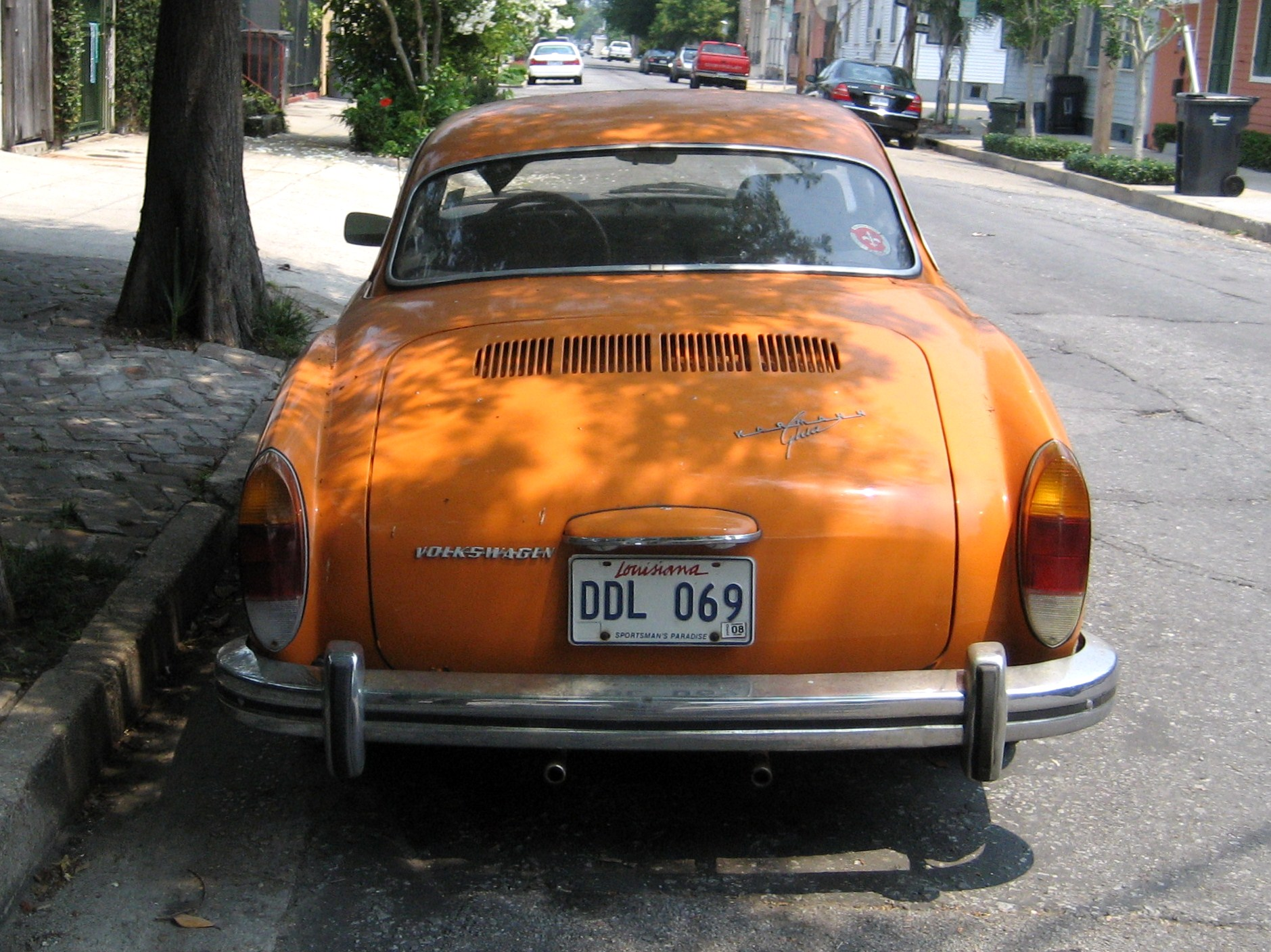
Tail lights (1972–1974)

== Type 34 Karmann Ghia ==
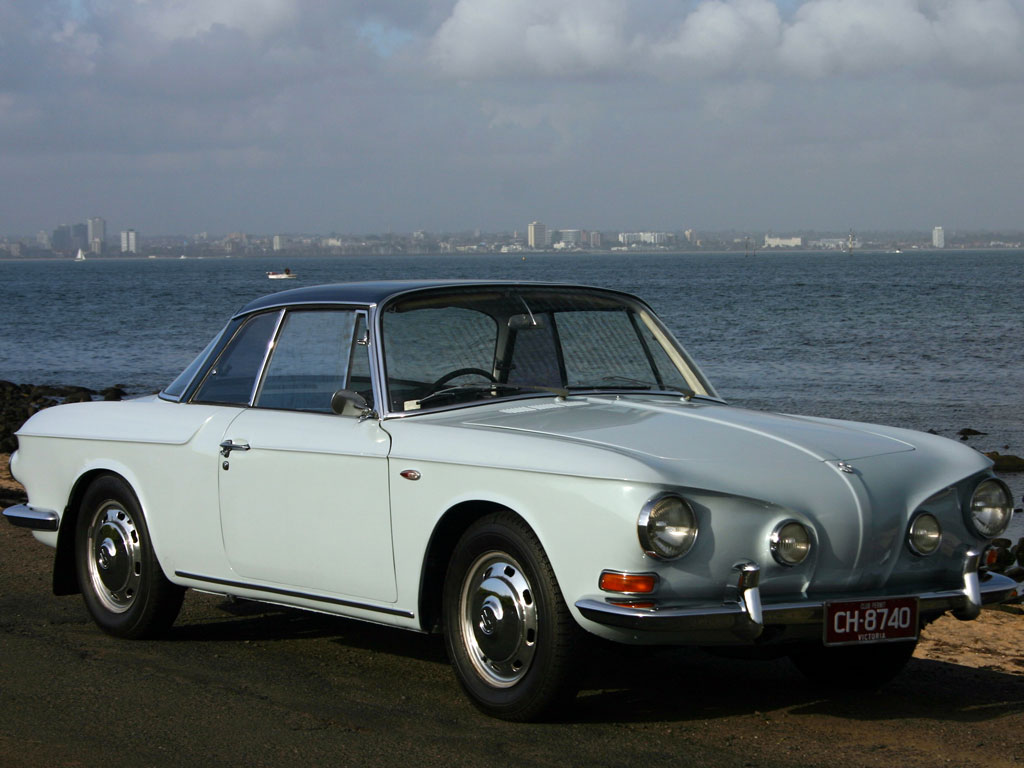
1966 VW Type 34 in Melbourne, Australia

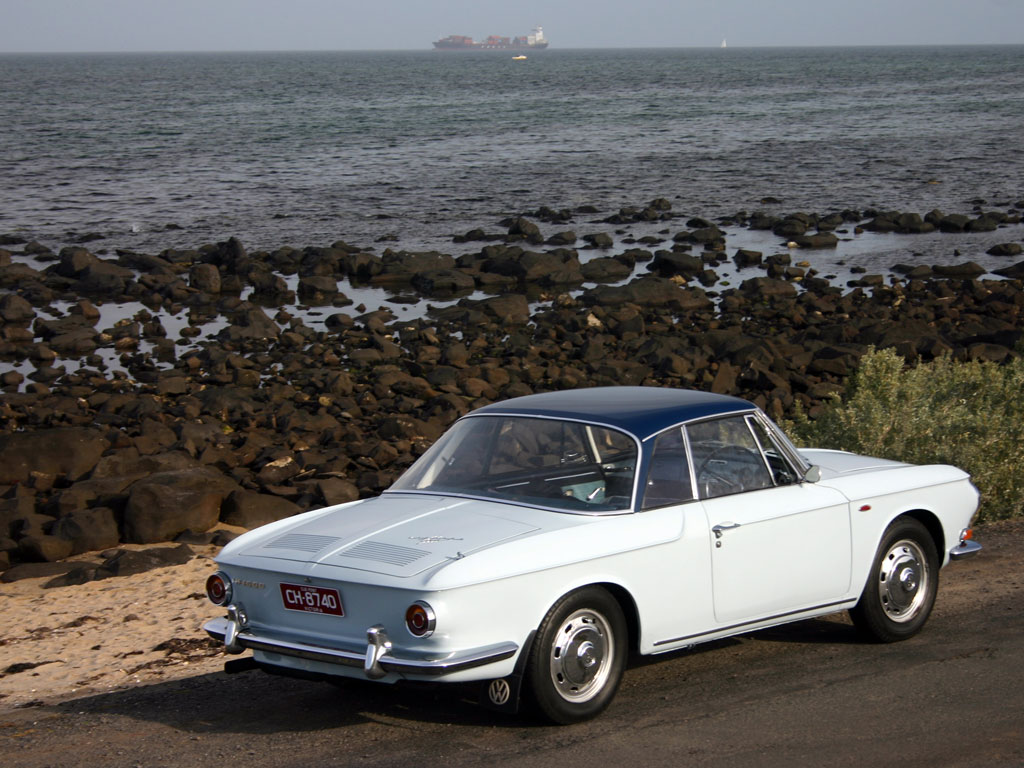
1966 VW Type 34 in Melbourne, Australia

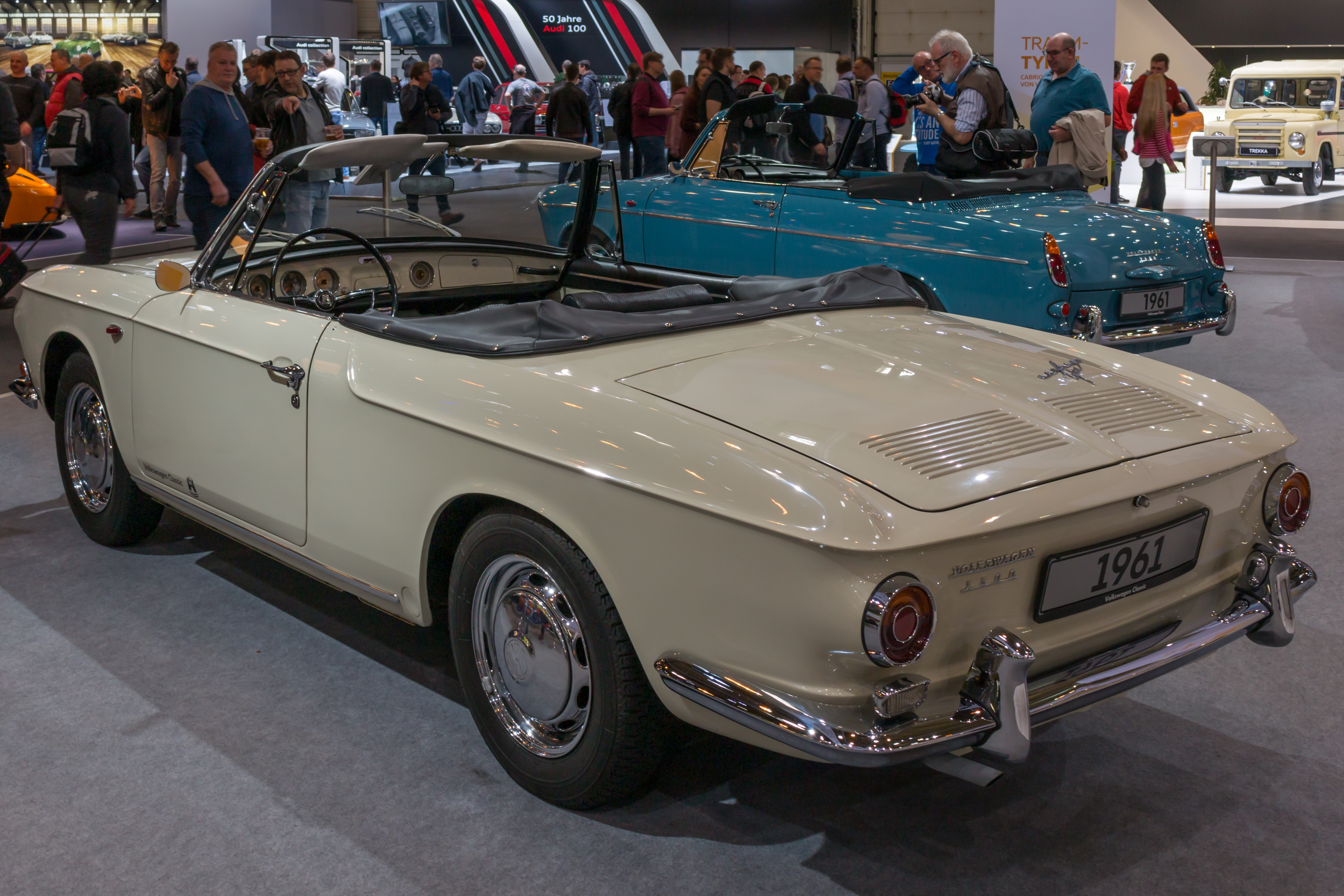
1961 VW Type 34 Convertible prototype. Only 17 were built.

In September 1961, based on the new VW 1500 (Type 3) 'ponton' models introduced that same year, Volkswagen also introduced a new VW 1500 Karmann Ghia model (Type 34), with a new body, designed by Italian engineer Sergio Sartorelli, positioned above the Beetle-based Karmann Ghia 1200 and 1300 models. Featuring more angular 1960s styling, the 1500 offered greater interior and cargo room, in three luggage spaces, than the first generation Karmann Ghia, despite unchanged wheelbase-length. Based on the new 1500's platform, with its new, bigger and more powerful 1500cc engine, the Type 34 was the fastest production Volkswagen of its day.

In 1962, an electrically operated sliding steel sunroof option was added – only the second automobile model in the world to have this option. The Karmann Ghia 1500 further featured round tail lights, built-in fog lights, an electric clock, upper and lower dash pads, door pads, and long padded armrests.

Due to model confusion once the original Type 14 Karmann Ghia was also introduced with the 1500 motor in 1967, the Type 34 was indicated variously as "Der Große Karmann" ("the big Karmann") in Germany, "Razor Edge Ghia" in the United Kingdom, or "European Ghia" (or "Type 3 Ghia" among enthusiasts) in the United States. Today the name Type 34 is recognized as the worldwide naming convention.

Until it was replaced by the VW-Porsche 914, it was the most expensive and luxurious passenger car VW manufactured in the 1960s – at the time costing twice as much as a Beetle in many markets. 42,505 (plus 17 prototype convertibles) were manufactured from 1962–1969.

Although the Type 34 was available in most countries, it was not offered officially in the U.S. – VW's largest and most important export market – another reason for its low sales numbers. Nevertheless, many made their way to the USA (most via Canada), and the USA now has the largest number of known Type 34s left in the world (400 of the total 1,500 to 2,000 or so remaining).

Like the earlier Type 14, the Type 34 was styled by the Italian design studio Ghia. There are some similar styling influences, but the Type 34 Ghia looks very different from the Type 14. The chassis is also a major difference between the cars; the Type 14 shares its chassis with a Beetle (though with a wider floorpan), whereas the Type 34 body is mounted on a Type 3 floorpan and drivetrain (the same as a 1500/1600 Notchback, Fastback or Variant (Squareback)) – all featuring the 1500 'pancake' engine that allowed a front and rear boot. This makes the Type 34 mechanically the same as other Type 3s. However, all bodywork and bumpers, the interior, glass, and most of the lenses are all unique to the Type 34. The car has wider 6.00-15 crossply tyres, until 1968 when they moved to 165R15 Pirelli Cinturato.

The Wilhelm Karmann factory assembly line which assembled the Type 34, since then also produced the VW-Porsche 914 (known as Porsche 914 in the USA), the Type 34's successor as the fastest VW.

== Karmann Ghia TC ==
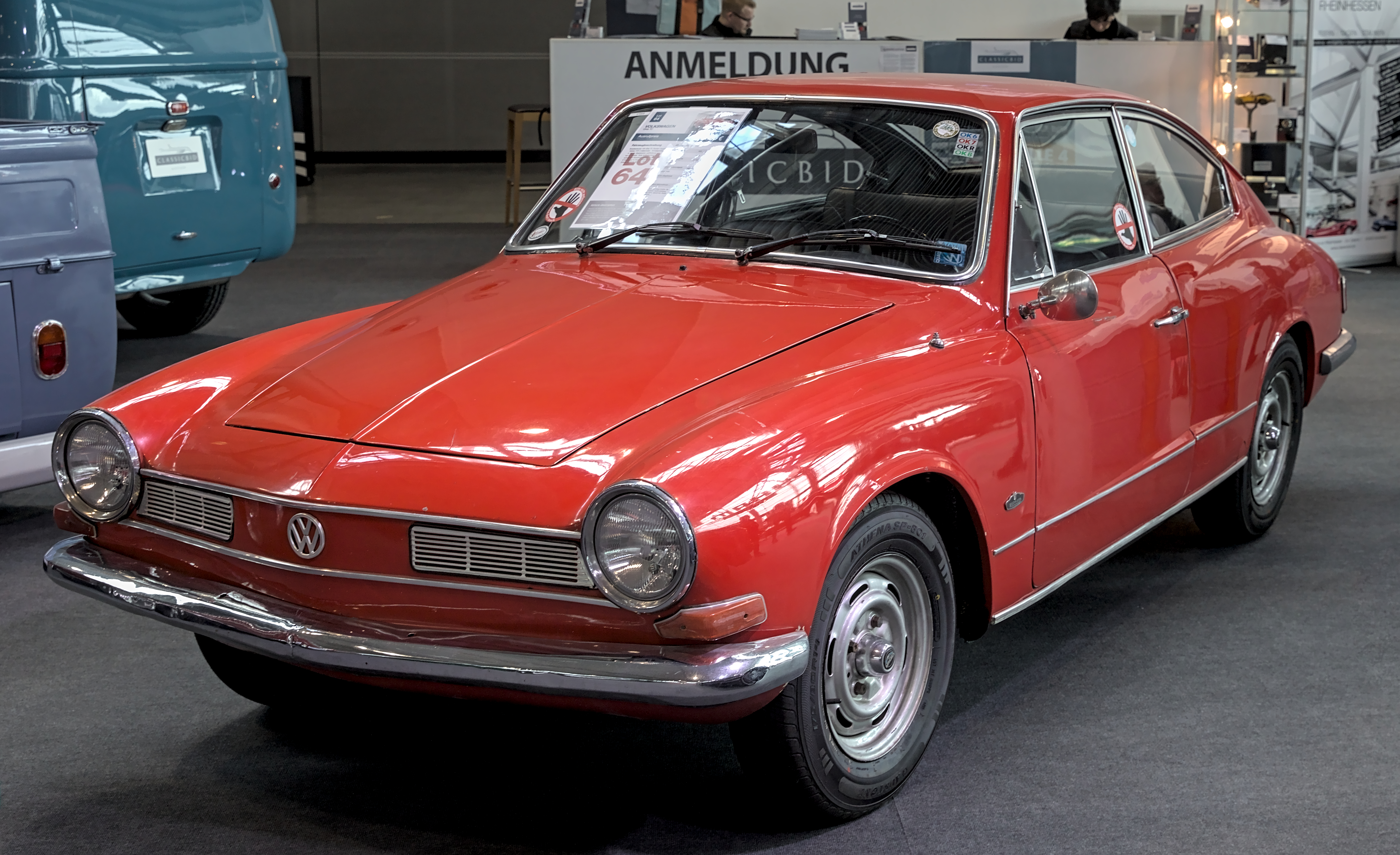
Karmann Ghia TC

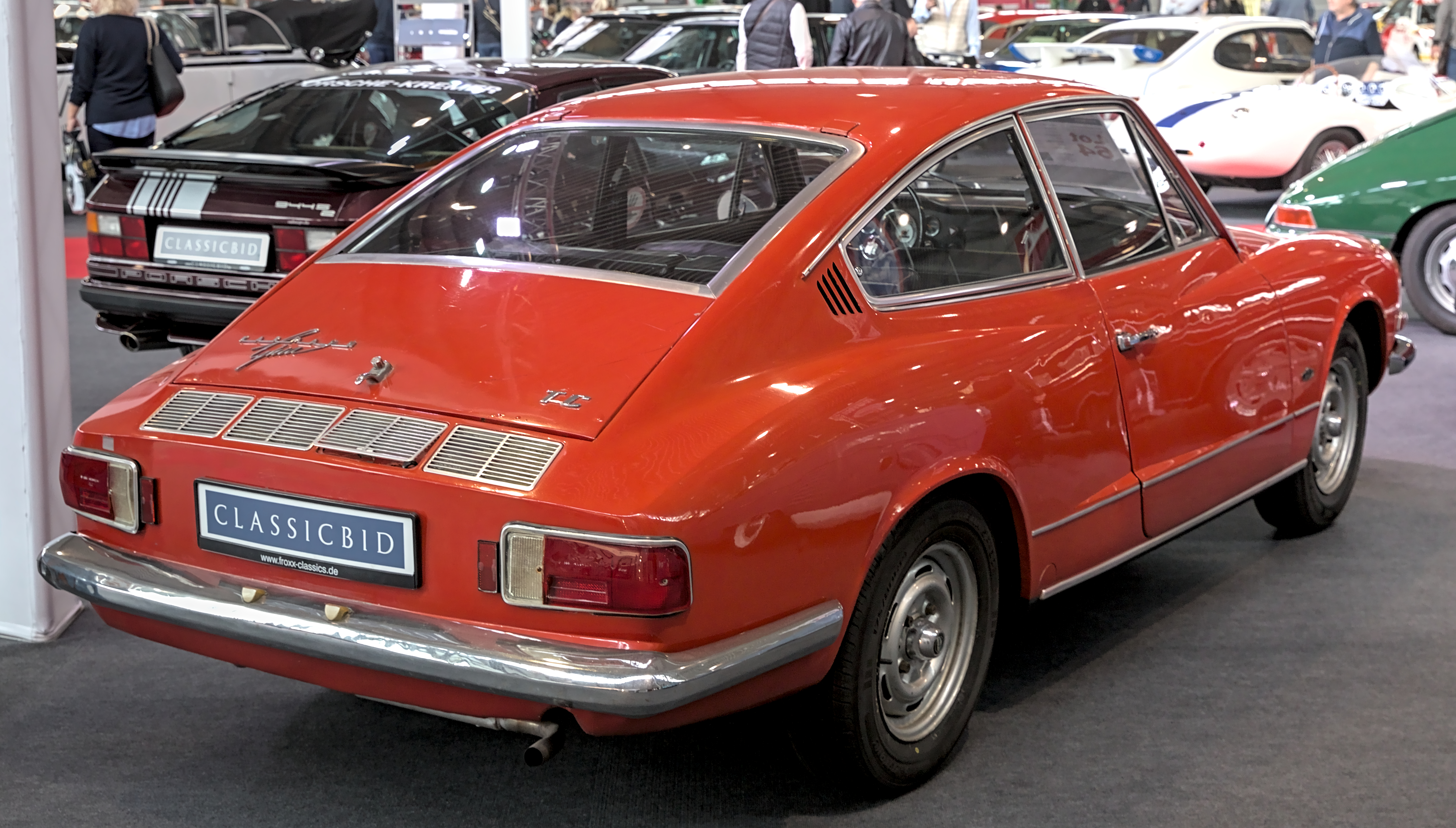
Karmann Ghia TC rear view

As an alternative to the Type 34 Karmann-Ghia coupé, which Volkswagen had introduced to Europe in 1961, Volkswagen do Brasil looked to Ghia in Turin for a reworked version of the Type 14 at the end of the 1960s. At the time Ghia employed the now famous Italian designer Giorgetto Giugiaro, who was set to work on the new Brazilian Karmann Ghia. The result was the Volkswagen Karmann Ghia TC (Touring Coupé), internally known as the Type 145, which began production in 1971 and was produced until 1975.

The TC was a roomy 2+2 coupe with a modern and comfortable interior. Underneath, it still shared components with the Type 14, but the TC used the platform of the VW 1600 Type 3 / Variant models instead of the Beetle's floorpan. The main difference was the engine: the Type 145 TC was fitted with the 1,584 cc flat-four air-cooled boxer unit from the Type 3 instead of the 1200cc units of the Type 14. The car produced 65 hp (48 kW) at 4,600 rpm and had a top speed of 86 mph (138 km/h), compared to the 34 hp (25 kW) and 72 mph (116 km/h) top speed of the Type 14 Karmann Ghia.

18,119 TC models were sold during their production that began at the turn of 1970 until the end of their sales in 1976. It was offered only in South America and was not exported off the continent. There is a prototype that is part of the factory museum collection of Karmann in Osnabrück, Germany.

== Subsequent concepts ==
In 1990, Karmann introduced a Karmann Ghia-inspired concept car – the Karmann Coupe – at the Frankfurt Motor Show, and in April 2013 Karmann Ghia do Brasil launched a competition for Brazilian students to design a modern interpretation of the classic Volkswagen Karmann-Ghia Coupé, possibly leading to the development of a prototype.
