= Çorman, Lachin =

Çorman
- Location within Azerbaijan Location within East Zangezur Economic Region
- Coordinates: 39°51′40″N 46°26′54″E
- Country: Azerbaijan
- District: Lachin

Population (2005)
  - Total: 14
- Time zone: UTC+4 (AZT)

Çorman (Chorman) is a village in the Lachin District of Azerbaijan.

== History ==
The village was located in the Armenian-occupied territories surrounding Nagorno-Karabakh, coming under the control of ethnic Armenian forces during the First Nagorno-Karabakh War in the early 1990s. The village subsequently became part of the breakaway Republic of Artsakh as part of its Kashatagh Province, where it was known as Chormank (Armenian: Չորմանք). It was returned to Azerbaijan as part of the 2020 Nagorno-Karabakh ceasefire agreement.

The Lachin District was handed back to Azerbaijan on 1 December 2020 under the terms of the ceasefire agreement.

== Historical heritage sites ==
Historical heritage sites in and around the village include a 9th/10th-century khachkar, a 17th-century cemetery, and two 17th-century tombstones. A 2021 report on Armenian cultural heritage also lists the 17th-century cemetery at Chormank among the village's recorded monuments.
