= Karmann =

German automobile and contract manufacturer

Coordinates: 52°15′57″N 8°4′40″E

Wilhelm Karmann GmbH
- Type: GmbH
- Industry: Automotive
- Founded: 1901
- Founder: Wilhelm Karmann
- Defunct: 2010
- Fate: Bankruptcy
- Headquarters: Osnabrück, Germany
- Key people: Jobst Wellensiek (chairman of the Supervisory Board)
- Products: Convertible automobiles; niche vehicles; convertible roof components
- Services: Automotive design; research and development

Wilhelm Karmann GmbH, commonly known as Karmann, was a German automobile manufacturer and contract manufacturer based in Osnabrück, Germany. Founded by Wilhelm Karmann in 1901, the company specialised in various automotive roles, including design, production and assembly of components for a wide variety of automobile manufacturers, including Chrysler, Porsche, Mercedes-Benz and Volkswagen Group.

The company was broken up in 2010, after filing for bankruptcy the previous year. Its convertible roof components were purchased by Webasto, Magna Steyr and Valmet Automotive, while the Osnabrück assembly plant, vehicle development, tools and assembly systems were transferred to Volkswagen.

== History ==
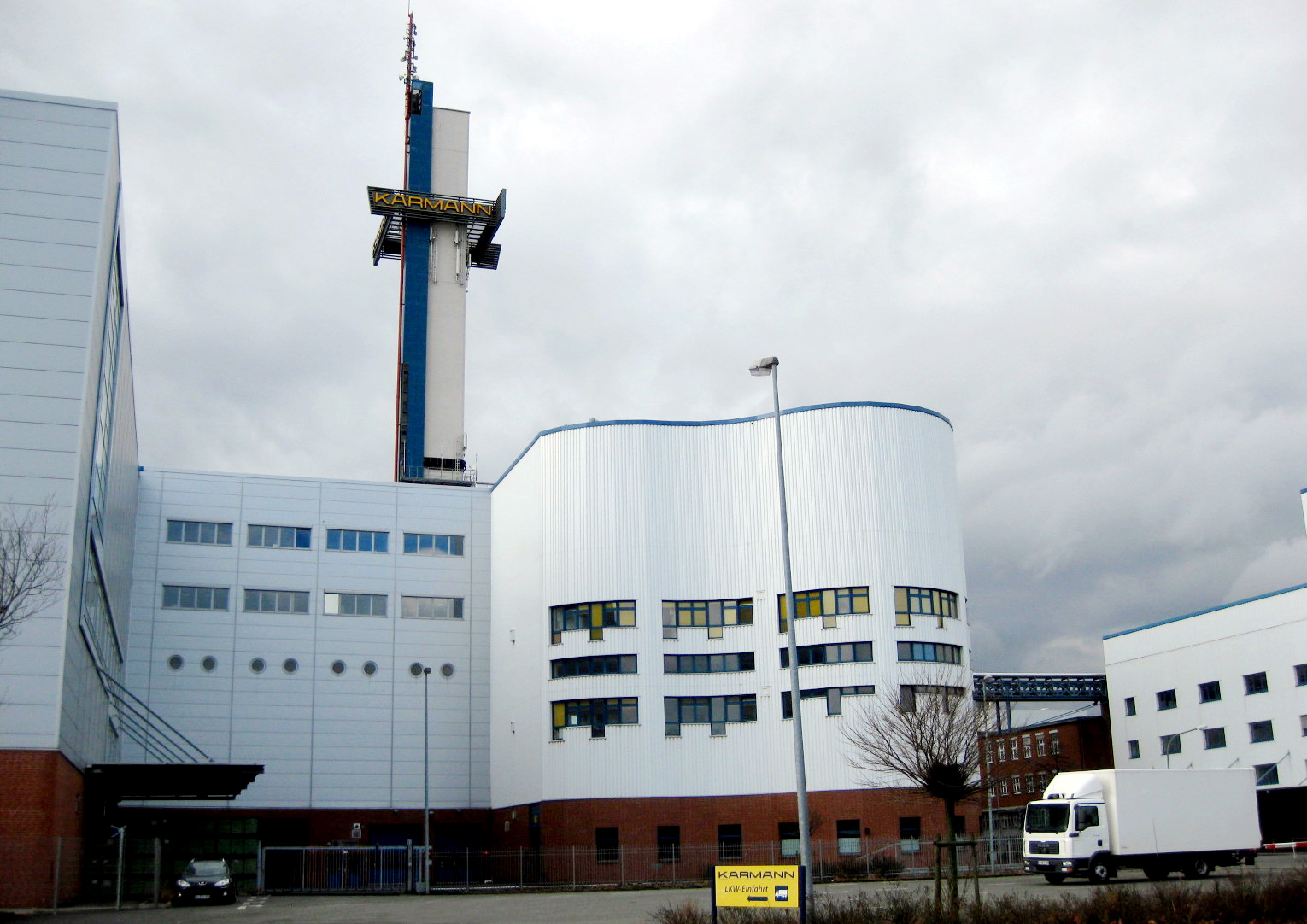
Karmann buildings in Osnabrück

=== 1950: The Beetle Cabriolet ===
Karmann was established in 1901 when Wilhelm Karmann purchased Klages, a coachbuilder founded in 1874, and renamed the business. The company then grew together with the expanding automobile industry. Karmann became known for its work on convertibles, coupés, and other niche models.

After World War II and the reconstruction of the plant destroyed in the war, Karmann turned its focus on contract manufacturing and development for Volkswagen. As early as 1935/36, Ferdinand Porsche had asked Karmann to investigate the possibilities of developing a prototype for a Volkswagen convertible. The chaos of the war prevented the idea from being pushed forward, as well as the cooperation with Volkswagen from starting 15 years earlier. On 1 August 1949, Wilhelm Karmann signed an order from Volkswagen for 1,000 "four-seater, four-wing convertible Type 15" - the Volkswagen Beetle Cabriolet. By 1999, Karmann’s cumulative production across all models — including the Beetle Cabriolet, Karmann-Ghia, and contract work for other manufacturers — had reached approximately 2.5 million vehicles.

=== 1955: The Karmann Ghia ===
The VW Karmann Ghia Type 14 is Karmann's best-known vehicle. Wilhelm Karmann Jr. conceived the idea in 1953, one year after taking over his father's car body company in Osnabrück. Karmann wanted to produce a sporty and open two-seater on the technical basis of the VW Beetle. Volkswagen was also interested in a sporty roadster that would be loved by American soldiers stationed in Europe and taken to the USA.

Luigi Segre, the boss of Carrozzeria Ghia in Turin, was included in the plan on the occasion of the Geneva Automobile Salon. A chassis of the beetle was shipped from Osnabrück to Italy and Segre put a self-designed body on the chassis. To Karmann's amazement, Segre presented him in Paris not a roadster, but a coupé.

Shortly afterwards, the automobile artwork was presented to the VW General Director back in Osnabrück. VW boss Heinrich Nordhoff liked the coupé with its flowing lines and rounded shapes, so he agreed to build the car on the same day. In the first year of production, a total of 10,000 coupés were delivered instead of the planned 3,000 units.

The VW Karmann Ghia became a sales success with over 360,000 units, even if the performance of the car with only 30 HP and 115 km/h top speed did not correspond to the sporty appearance. 1957 followed the Karmann Ghia Cabriolet and 1961 the bigger Type 34, the Karmann Ghia 1550, the design of which also came from Carrozzeria Ghia.

In the quantities produced by Karmann, the Karmann Ghia coupés and convertibles were later slightly surpassed by both the Golf Cabriolet and the Scirocco; only when the first Karmann Ghia types were added together via the coupé and convertible was the Karmann Ghia the most successful Karmann vehicle.

=== 1960s-2010: Further Contracts ===
In addition to the Beetle Cabriolet and Karmann Ghia, all cabriolet variants of the VW Golf, as well as the Scirocco and Corrado, were built by Karmann. The 1960s saw the expansion of the company, and further vehicle plants were set up in São Bernardo do Campo (Brazil) and Rheine. In the years after 1965, complete vehicles and bodies of the BMW New Class Coupé, and its successor, the larger E9, were produced in Rheine. BMW handled the installation of the engine and final assembly at the Munich plant. Karmann also built complete cars for Porsche to increase production of the 912 and 911 models.

Karmann assembled complete knock down (CKD) kits in an agreement with American Motors (AMC). In 1968, AMC introduced the Javelin, a new competitor in the U.S. "pony car" segment. AMC did not have a manufacturing subsidiary in Europe, therefore, Karmann assembled the American-designed car for distribution in Europe. Karmann built the cars in Rheine with 280 horsepower (209 kW) 343 cu in (5.6 L) V8 engines. About 90% of the necessary components were shipped by boat from the U.S. All were SST trim versions and their name, Javelin 79-K stood for AMC's "79" model number and the "K" for Karmann.

In 1969, they began manufacturing the Porsche 914, and they made all four-cylinder cars. In the late 1970s and 1980s, Karmann produced the bodyshells of the BMW 6 Series Coupé and the Ford Escort RS Cosworth convertible models for the Ford Escort as complete vehicles. From the beginning of the 1990s, European-market Kia Sportages, and from 1997, the Audi Cabriolet (type 89), and the Audi A4 Cabriolet (from 2002), as well as the Chrysler Crossfire (2003) and the Mercedes-Benz CLK Cabriolet (A209, 2003) were produced as complete vehicles. Production of VW's Vento/Jetta (1992/93) and the Golf Variant A3 (1997/99) also shifted from Volkswagen in Wolfsburg to Karmann in Osnabrück.

From 1985 to 1989, Karmann produced the Merkur XR4Ti (an American-market version of the Ford Sierra for the Merkur brand); and from 2003 to 2007, the Chrysler Crossfire coupe and convertible for Chrysler, at the time DaimlerChrysler. Many Karmann-built vehicles feature a small wagon wheel emblem, the coat of arms of Osnabrück, where the company was founded. A large part of the development of the Crossfire was carried out independently by Karmann, and the vehicle was produced at its Osnabrück facility. Karmann U.S. also supplied the top subassemblies for the convertible variants of both the third-generation Chrysler Sebring and the Ford Mustang.

A small number of vehicles were also produced in Brazil (São Bernardo do Campo). The Osnabrück facility also produced the chassis and body panels of the Spyker C8 Spyder.

The production facilities in Osnabrück, Chorzów, Poland; Yokohama, Japan; Sunderland, UK; Puebla, Mexico; and Plymouth Township, U.S.; manufactured roof systems for convertibles. These included the Mercedes-Benz CLK, the Renault Mégane CC, the Nissan Micra C+C, the Pontiac G6, the Chrysler Sebring, the Ford Mustang, the Bentley Continental, the BMW 1 Series, and the Volkswagen New Beetle Cabriolet.

== Production to 2010 ==
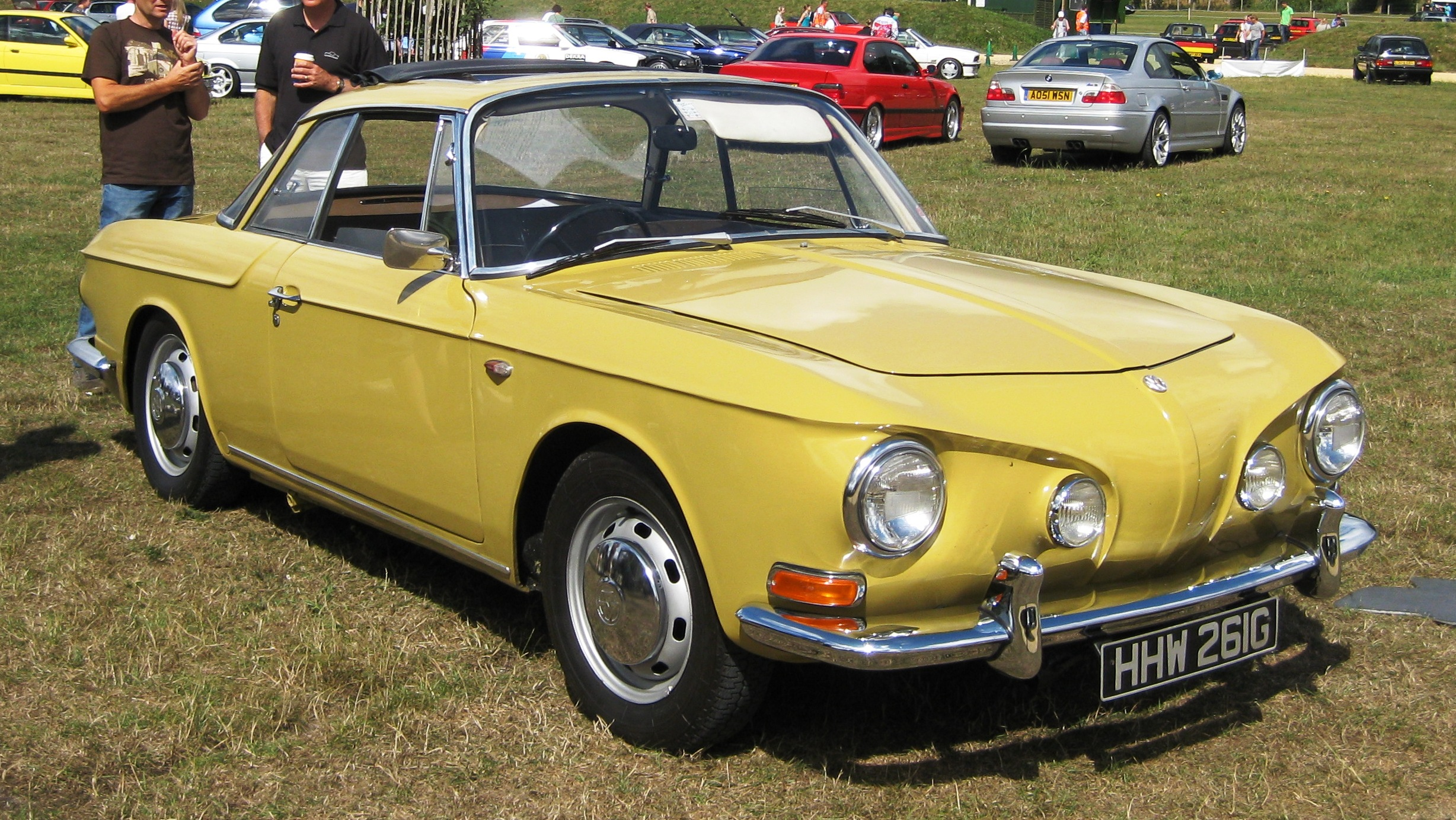
Volkswagen Karmann Ghia Type 34 (1961–1966)

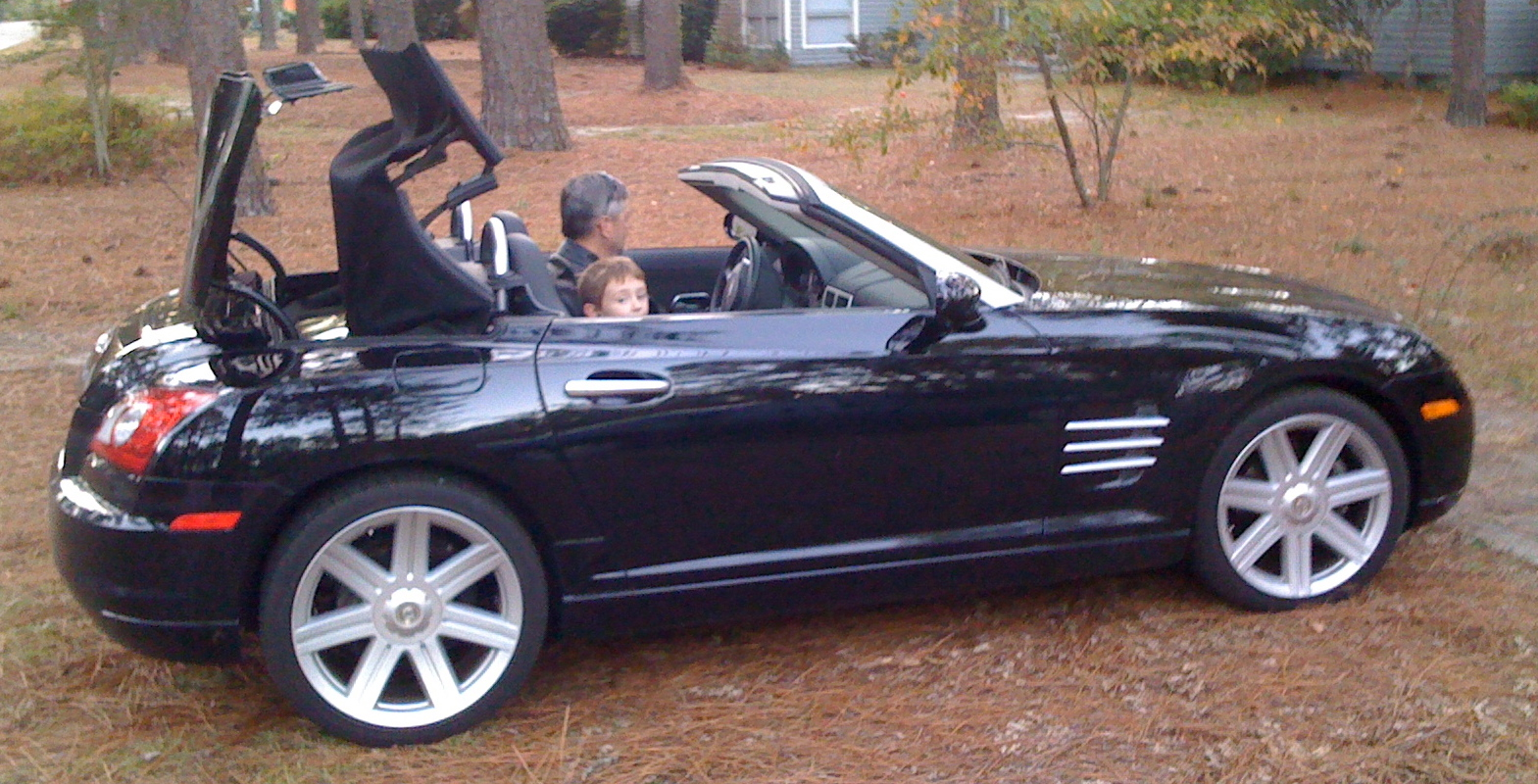
Chrysler Crossfire convertible top in operation

Since its beginning in 1901, Karmann built more than three million complete vehicles of the models as follows, exceptions as indicated:

car make / type	years	number of cars	comments
AMC Javelin 79-K coupé	1968	281	Built in Rheine
Audi Cabriolet	1997–2000	12,112	Built in Rheine
Audi A4 cabriolet & Audi S4 cabriolet & Audi RS4 (B7) cabriolet	2002–2008	81,959	B6 and B7 (Built in Rheine)
BMW 2000 C/CS	1965–1970	13,696	only body in white (Built in Rheine)
BMW E9	1971–1975	21,147	Built in Rheine
BMW 6-Series	1976–1989	86,314	
Chrysler Crossfire coupé	2003–2008	37,896	
Chrysler Crossfire convertible	2003–2008	16,269	
Ford Escort FEC convertible	1983–1990	104,237	Built in Rheine
Ford Escort convertible	1990–1997	80,620	Built in Rheine
Ford Escort RS Cosworth	1992–1996	8,082	Built in Rheine
Merkur XR4Ti	1985–1989	42,000	U.S. version of the Ford Sierra XR4i (Built in Rheine)
Land Rover Defender	2002–2005	2,777	Built in Brazil
Mercedes-Benz CLK-Class (A208) cabriolet	1998–2003	115,264	
Mercedes-Benz CLK-Class (C208) coupé	2000–2002	28,706	
Mercedes-Benz CLK-Class (A209) cabriolet	2003–2008		
Nissan Micra C+C	2006–2010		
Porsche 356 B Hardtop	1961-1962	<2,300	
Porsche 911	1966–1971		911, 911T, and 911E coupes only
Porsche 912	1966–1969		coupe only
Porsche 914	1969–1976	118,949	
Porsche 968	1991–1994	11,803	only body in white
Renault 19 convertible	1990–1996	29,222	body in white and soft tops
Renault Mégane I convertible	1996–2003	74,096	body in white and soft tops
Renault Mégane CC	2004-2010		only retractable hardtops
Triumph TR6	1969–1976	94,619	
Volkswagen Beetle convertible	1949–1980	331,847	
Volkswagen Karmann Ghia coupé	1955–1974	362,601	
Volkswagen Karmann Ghia convertible	1957–1974	80,881	
Volkswagen Karmann Ghia Type 34	1961–1969	42,505	
Volkswagen Golf Mk1 convertible	1979–1993	388,522	
Volkswagen Corrado	1988–1995	97,521	
Volkswagen Golf Mk3 convertible	1993–1997	129,475	
Volkswagen Golf Mk3 Variant	1997–1999	80,928	
Volkswagen Golf "Mk4" convertible	1997–2001	82,588	Updated Golf Mk3
Volkswagen Scirocco I	1974–1981	504,153	
Volkswagen Scirocco II	1981–1992	291,497	

=== Car modules ===
- Chassis
  - Chrysler Crossfire Coupé 2001–2007
  - Chrysler Crossfire Roadster 2003–2007
  - Mercedes-Benz CLK
  - Spyker C8 Spyder
- Roof modules
  - Audi A4 and Audi S4 Cabriolet, 2001
  - Bentley Continental GTC convertible, 2006
  - BMW 1 Series convertible
  - Mercedes CLK convertible
  - Nissan Micra C+C retractable hardtop, 2005
  - Renault Mégane CC retractable hardtop, 2002
  - Volkswagen New Beetle Cabriolet
  - Pontiac G6 retractable hardtop, 2007
  - Chrysler Sebring retractable hardtop and convertible softtop, 2007
  - Ford Mustang convertible, 2007

=== Motorhomes ===
The first Karmann motorhomes were launched in 1974 based on the Volkswagen Type 2 'Bay Window' chassis. The bodies were of a sandwich structure. These motorhomes had two beds, kitchen, shower, waste water tank, rear body supports, leisure battery, toilet, water heater and gas heating. Options included the luggage rack over the driver's cab. Approximately 1,000 units were produced through 1979.

With the introduction of the Volkswagen T2/3 - also known as the (T3/Vanagon/Transporter/T25) in 1979, the motorhomes received a permanent overhead area with a bed for two people. Called Karmann Gipsy, 741 were made between 1980 and 1992. This number excludes 30 or more Type 3 Syncro models made between 1986 and 1989, and 7 Syncro 16" models made between 1991 and 1992. In addition 113 Cheetah T2/3's were manufactured between 1986 and 1990 to make a total 891 Volkswagen T3 Karmann Coachbuilt Motorhomes - all produced in Karmann Rheine factory and not at Osnabruck as commonly believed.

From 1978 to 1996, a total of 3,103 Volkswagen LT-based models were produced. These included the LT "M", LT "L 1", LT "L 2", LT "L Distance Wide", LT "L Distance-Wide Gold", LT "H Distance-Wide", LT "H Distance-Wide Gold", LT "S Distance-Wide" and the top-of-the-line LT "Distance-Wide Autovilla".

In 1991, the Karmann motorhome design was updated and based on the Volkswagen T4. The Gipsy and Cheetah models names were retained in the form of the Gipsy I (SWB) and Cheetah (LWB). In 1996 two new models were introduced namely the Colorado and Missouri. The Volkswagen Transporter (T5)-based versions were introduced in 2003.

== Insolvency proceedings ==
On 8 April 2009, Karmann filed for insolvency proceedings due to the sharp decline in demand for cars, and the company's financial obligations. The employment protection contracts of the large OEMs with the unions and the technological progress in vehicle construction led to the fact that the production of niche vehicles was no longer outsourced, but rather carried out within the OEM production network. Volkswagen, Karmann's longtime partner, revealed on 24 October that it had made an offer to acquire the company.

On 20 November, Volkswagen took over the factory buildings, machinery, plant and land from the Karmann insolvent estate. With the exception of roof systems, Volkswagen Osnabrück encompasses former Karmann divisions: production systems (metal group), press shop, body shop, paint shop, assembly and technical development.

On 4 November 2010, Finland's Valmet Automotive signed an agreement to buy Karmann's roof-component sections in Osnabrück and Żary, Poland. Karmann's North American operations were sold in August 2010 to Webasto Group. Effective 25 February 2010, the Japanese production site of Karmann was acquired by Magna International. Magna Steyr also manufactured the roof system for the Infiniti G37 Convertible in addition to the roof system for the Nissan 370Z Roadster.

== Production after 2010 ==
The Volkswagen-owned operations have produced the following:

car make / type	years	number of cars	comments
Volkswagen Golf Mk6 Convertible	2011–2016		complete build
Porsche Cayman (Type 981c)	2012–2016		final assembly
Porsche Boxster (Type 981)	2012–2016		final assembly
Volkswagen XL1	2014–2016		complete build
Porsche Cayenne	2015–2017		final assembly, intermediate between Leipzig and Bratislava
Škoda Fabia	2016-2019		painting (some)
Volkswagen Tiguan Gen 1	2017–2018		shifted paint and final assembly of last model years of first generation Tiguan to Osnabrück
Porsche 718 Cayman (Type 982)	2017–2021		final assembly
MOIA +6	2018		complete build
Škoda Karoq	2018-2019		final assembly
VW T-Roc Cabriolet	2019–present		complete build
VW Arteon Shooting Brake	2021–2024		final assembly

== Karmann concepts ==
Cheetah, 1970

Idea, 1991

4-door coupe

Coupé, 1999

Transformer, 2001

SUC, 2005
