= Sergio Sartorelli =

Italian automotive designer and engineer

- Born: 7 May 1928; Alessandria, Italy
- Died: 28 November 2009 (aged 81); Turin, Italy
- Occupation: Automotive designer
- Known for: Design at Carrozzeria Ghia, OSI, and Fiat

Sergio Sartorelli (7 May 1928 – 28 November 2009) was a noted Italian automotive designer and engineer.

During his career at Carrozzeria Ghia, OSI, and finally Fiat, Sartorelli became widely known for his work on the Fiat 2300 S Coupé, Karmann Ghia Type 34, and the Fiat 126.

He was the honorary president of the Italian Volkswagen Karmann Ghia Club.

== Background ==
Sartorelli was born on 7 May 1928 in Alessandria. As a young teen, Sartorelli had a passion for cars, trucks, trains, and even military vehicles. To mentally escape the depth of World War II, he spent his time filling school notebooks with sketches and building scale wooden models of cars.

After the war he earned a degree in mechanical engineering at the Polytechnic University of Turin in 1954, followed by 18 months of Military Service as a cartographer. During his military service, he continued to sketch for Carrozzeria Boano.

After his military service, he was turned down by Boano and Pininfarina, but in 1956 was hired by Ing. Giovanni Savonuzzi at Ghia.

== Career ==
Sergio Sartorelli's career at Ghia rose quickly when in 1957, engineer Savonuzzi left Ghia for Chrysler, Sartorelli became Head of the Style Prototypes. After the sudden death of Luigi Segre, owner and chief stylist of Carrozzeria Ghia, Sartorelli left Ghia.

Officine Stampaggi Industriali (OSI) was set up as a parallel and complementary company to Ghia and it was part owned by Luigi Segre. With the death of Segre the partnership disappeared and OSI was left with no styling department. After two years of a freelance relationship with Michelotti, OSI set up its own styling department called Centro Stile e Esperienze OSI, and appointed Sergio Sartorelli as its director. This arrangement lasted from 1965 until December 1967 when OSI reorganized.

In 1968 what was left of Centro Stile e Esperienze OSI, became the Future Studies department at Centro Stile Fiat with Sergio Sartorelli as its head, it was entrusted with the study of design, automotive development, and modeling of prototypes for Fiat.

By 1984 with the car market in crisis, Fiat let Sergio Sartorelli go, and he retired from his design career.

== Design work ==
Sergio Sartorelli's design work included:

Year	Model	Firm	Notes
1957	Volkswagen 1200 Beetle	Ghia	prototype for Beetle replacement
1957	Fiat 1100/103 TV Coupe, Cabriolet	Ghia	1957 Turin Motor Show
1957	Fiat 500 Jolly	Ghia	
1957	Fiat 600 Jolly	Ghia	
1957	Dual-Ghia 375 Coupé	Ghia	
1957	Ghia Crown Imperial limousine	Ghia	1957–1963 collaboration with Chrysler Corp. design team
1958	Fiat 1100/103 Giardinetta	Ghia	
1959	Karmann-Ghia Coupe Type 14	Ghia	styling update
1959	Ghia Selene I	Ghia	designed with Tom Tjaarda
1960	Fiat 2300 S Coupé	Ghia	production model debut at 1961 Geneva Motor Show
1960	Karmann-Ghia Coupe 1500 Type 34	Ghia	1961 debut, Frankfurt motor show
1961	Maserati 5000 GT	Ghia	one-off for Ferdinando Innocenti
1962	Alfa Romeo 2600 Spider	Ghia	one-off prototype
1962	Ghia 1500 GT	Ghia	
1963	Ghia-Fiat G230S	Ghia	prototype introduced at Turin Motor Show
1965	OSI-Ford 20 M TS Coupé and Spider	OSI	Produced from 1966 to 1968, only one Spider was made.
1966	Alfa Romeo Scarabeo	OSI	2 bodies
1966	Innocenti C coupé	OSI	
1967	Fiat 125 Station Wagon	OSI	
1972	Fiat 126	Fiat	replacement for Fiat 500 introduced at Turin Motor Show
1978	Fiat Ritmo	Fiat	introduced at 1978 Turin Motor Show to replace Fiat 128

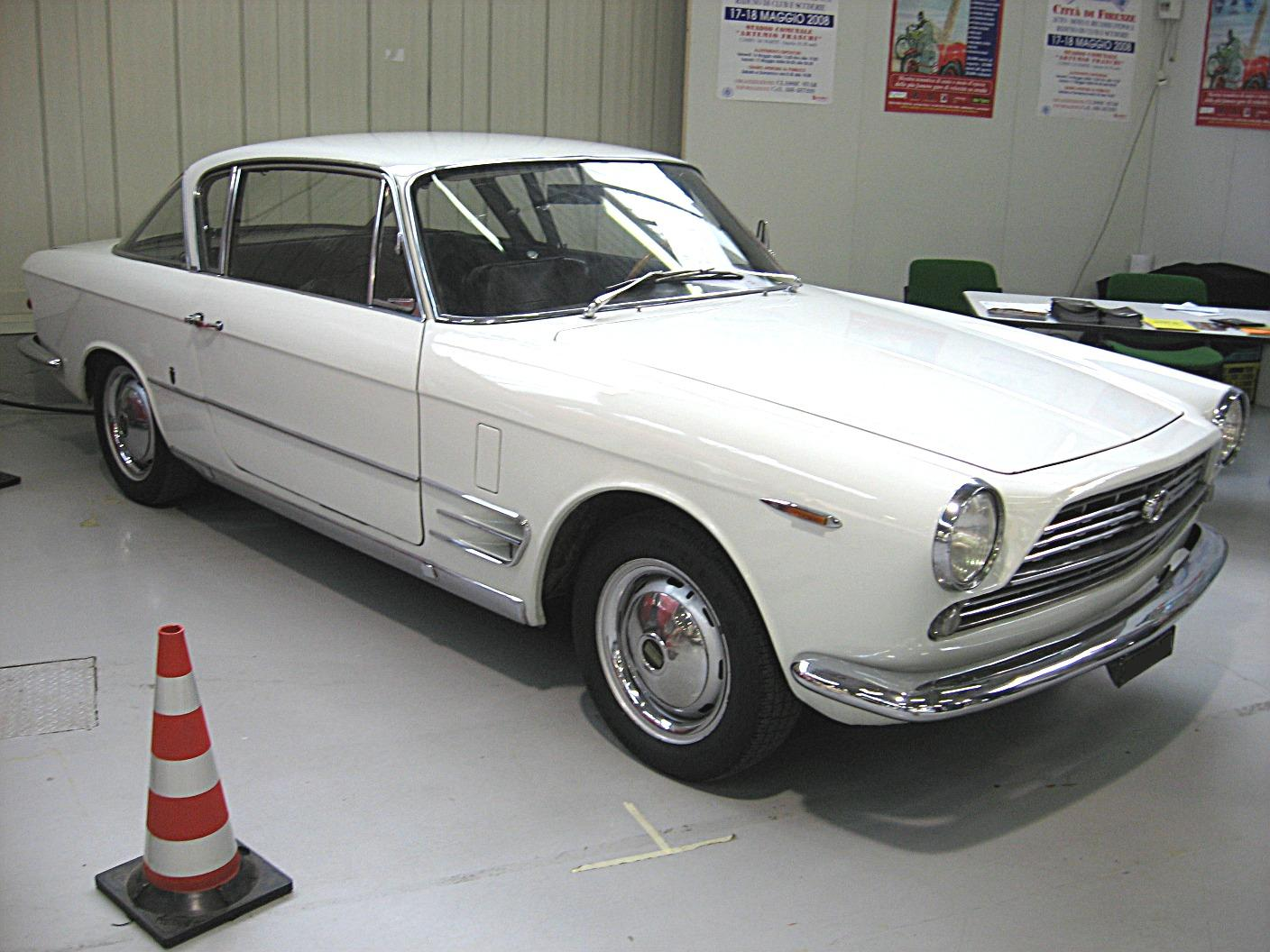
Fiat 2300 S Coupe

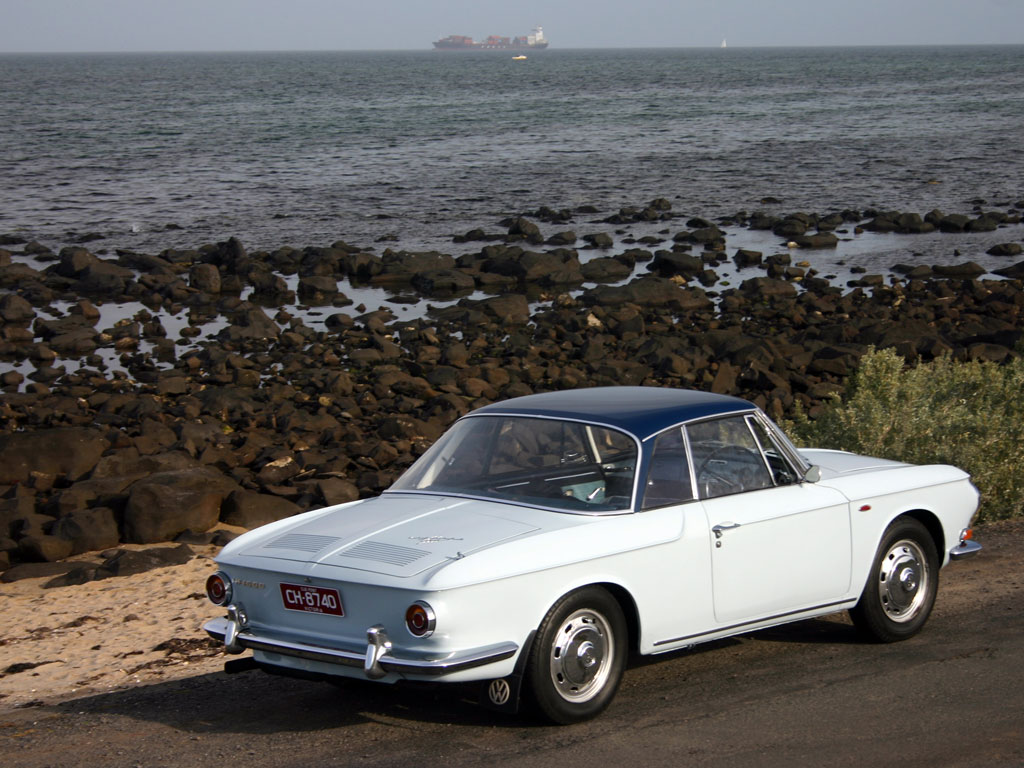
1966 Type 34 Karmann Ghia

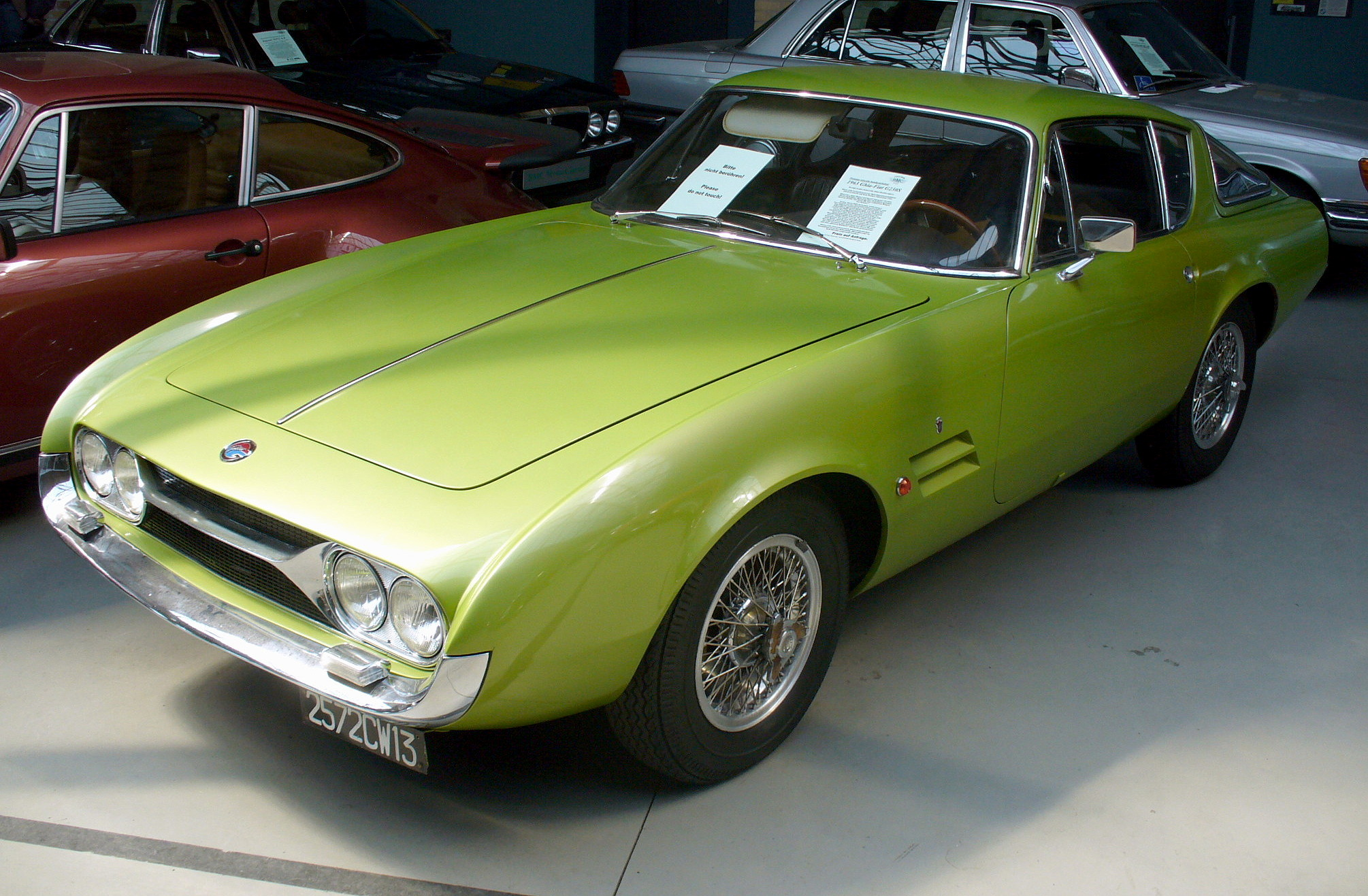
Ghia-Fiat G230S

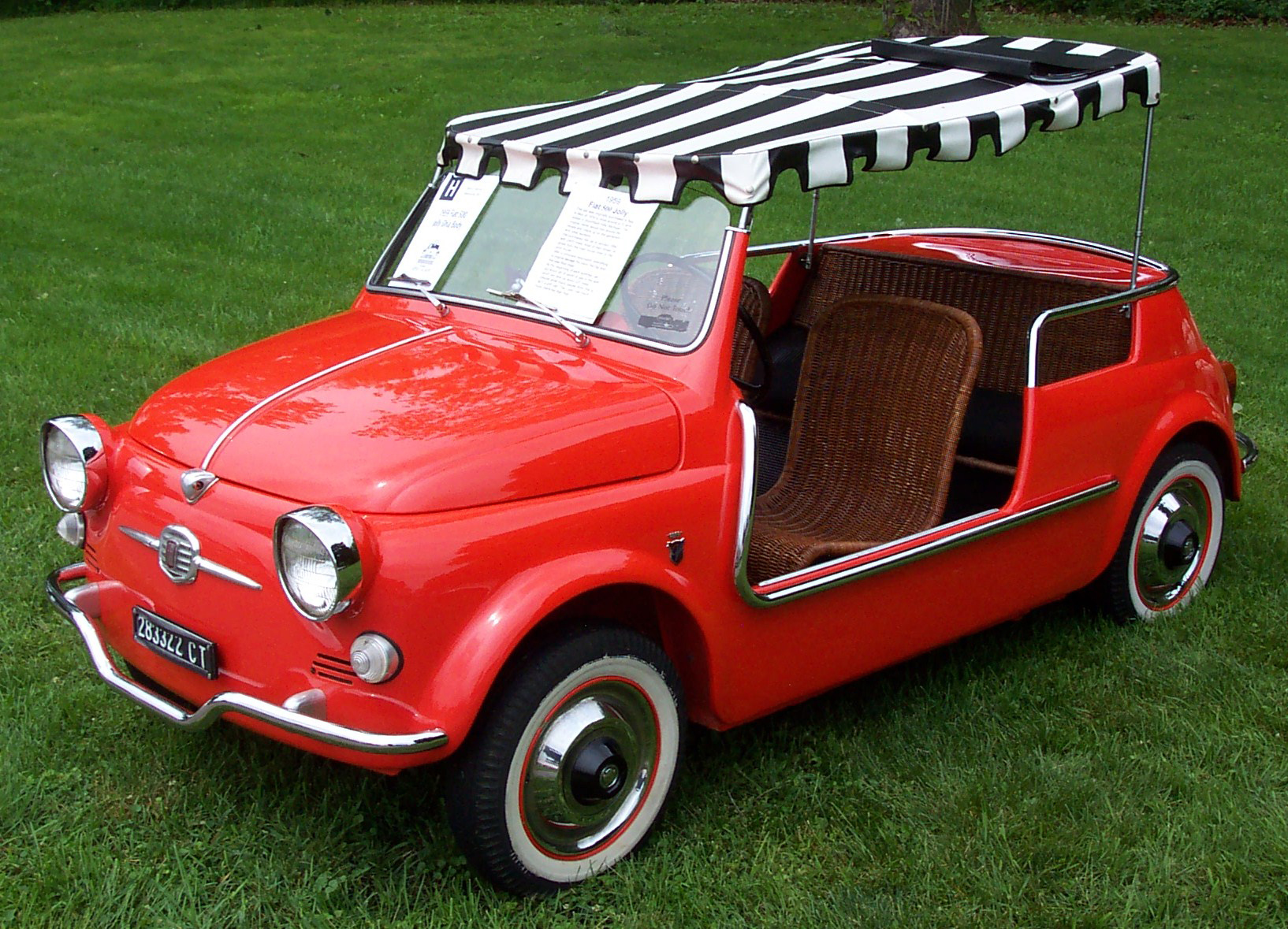
Fiat 500 Ghia Jolly

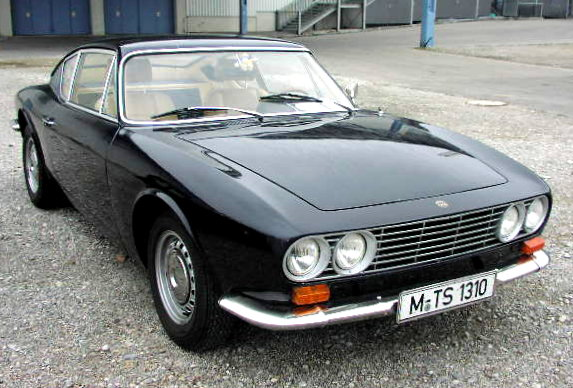
OSI-Ford 20 M TS

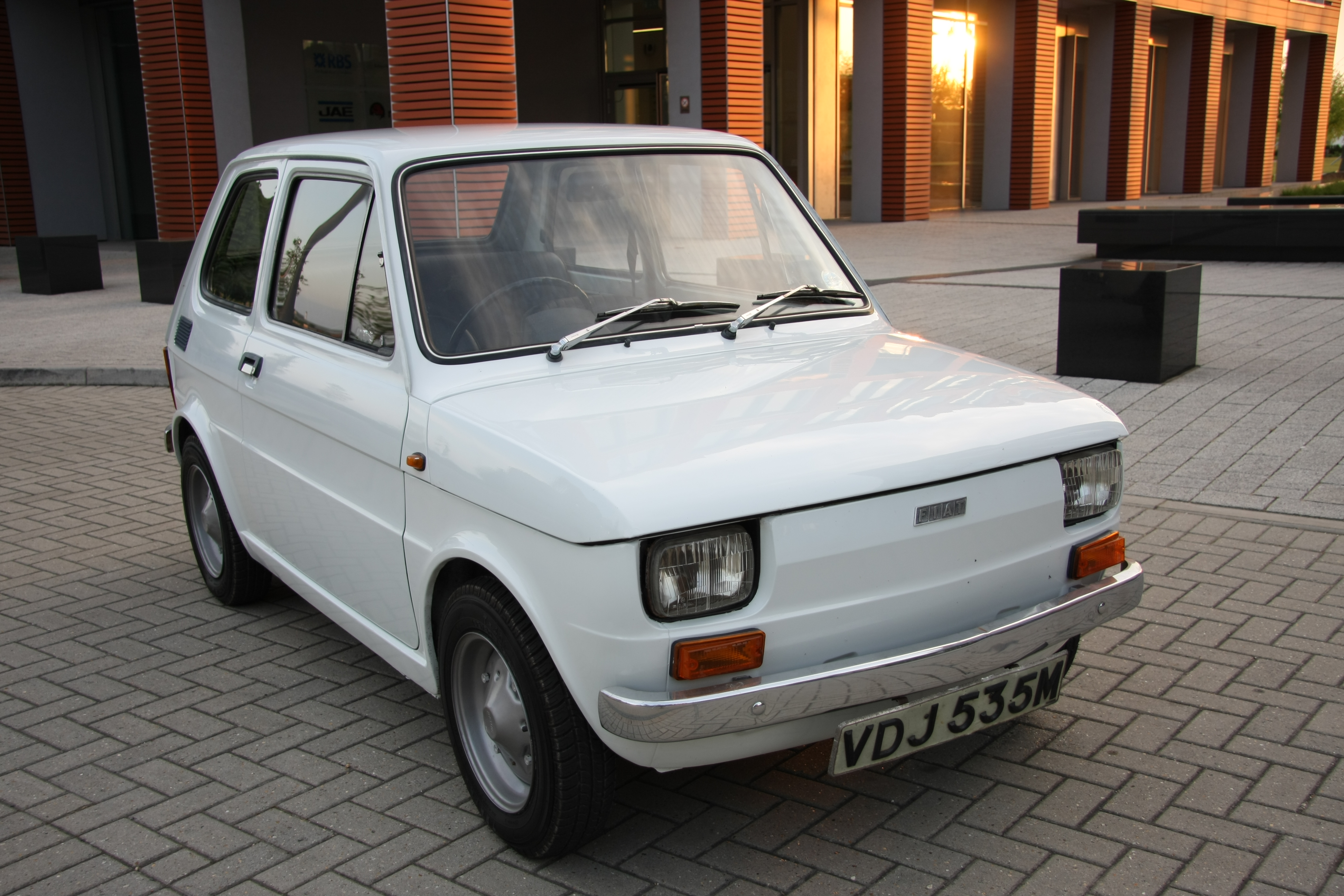
Fiat 126

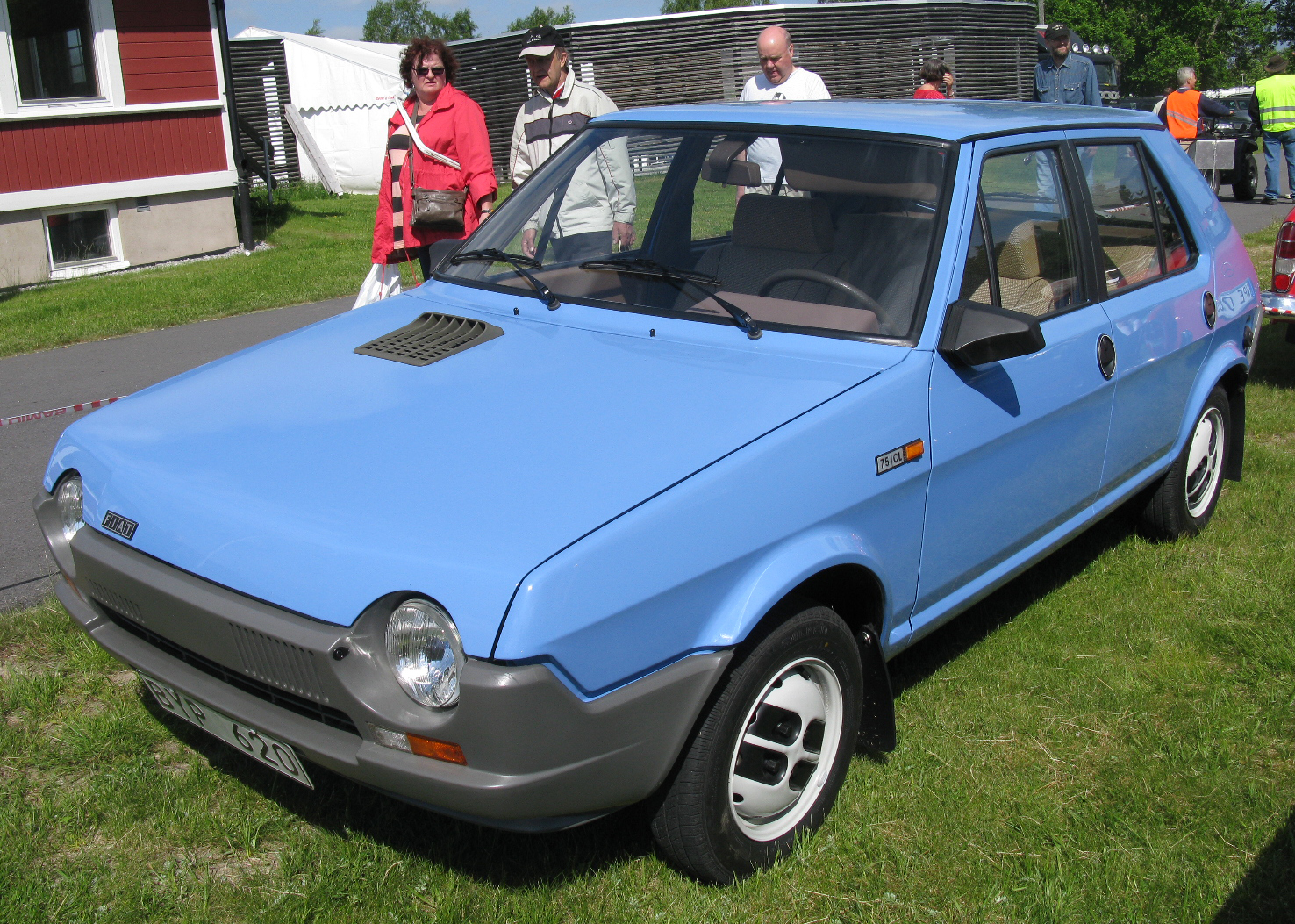
Fiat Ritmo
