= Autobleu =

French autoparts and automobile manufacturer

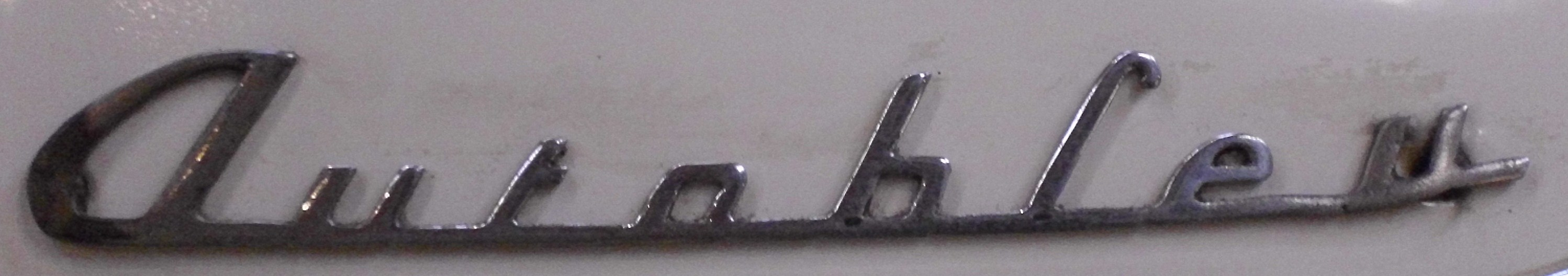
- Industry: Automobile and autoparts manufacturing
- Founders: Maurice Mestivier; Roger Lepeytre
- Headquarters: Paris, France
- Key people: Roger Normier

Autobleu was a French automotive parts manufacturer based in Paris. They produced a variety of components, but were best known for their intake and exhaust manifolds. They also built a small number of customized cars based on models from larger manufacturers.

== History ==
The Autobleu company was established in January 1950 by Maurice Mestivier and Roger Lepeytre. Mestivier was a former Amilcar mechanic who had become a racing driver, and then President of l'Association Générale des Amicales et Coureurs Indépendants (l'AGACI, the French Drivers Association). Lepeytre was a representative for Peugeot in Montrouge, and was Secretary General of l'AGACI. The company was located at 15 rue Aumont-Thiéville, in the 17th arrondissement in Paris. One of their first hires was mechanic Roger Normier.

Autobleu's original success came from manufacturing performance parts for French cars, the Renault 4CV in particular. The 4CV was France's best selling car at this time, and its enduring popularity helped Autobleu flourish. The company became a parts supplier to Renault.

Autobleu built a small number of customized cars starting in 1953. It ceased operating as a car manufacturer in 1957, although one final prototype was shown in 1967. The auto parts division continued operating until 1971. At one point Autobleu was supplying 120 manifolds per day directly to Renault. By the time it ceased operations, Autobleu had supplied as many as 200,000 manifolds for cars such as the Renault R8 Gordini and various Alpine models.

For a short time Autobleu also built and sold Abarth parts under license.

In 1997, a company named Nantes Echappement Cintrage Autobleu was established as a maker of exhaust systems. This company was liquidated in 2009.

As of 2022, some reproduction Autobleu parts are available through Mecaparts, who acquired the manufacturing rights to the originals.

== Auto parts and kits ==
Autobleu's most popular product was their range of intake and exhaust manifolds, particularly those for Renault cars. Their manifolds were often simply called "le pipe Autobleu".

The company had several different manifold product lines, including ones called Racer, Record, Rallye, Monza, Mille Miles, Sebring, Stelvio, and Veloce. Within a product line, there were different models for different applications; the Veloce II was for the Renault Dauphine, the Veloce 16 was for the Renault 16, and the Veloce ID was for the Citroën ID 19.

Some of Autobleu's parts were used on Renault factory specials. They supplied the manifolds for the Renault 4CV 1063. The parts that turned a stock 4CV into a 1063 were also available as a kit that could be purchased through SAPRAR (Société anonyme de Pièces, Réparations et Accessoires Renault).

Another factory model with Autobleu parts was the Renault 4CV "Pie" police version. Police departments began switching to the Autobleu-tuned model in 1962.

When the performance-oriented Dauphine 1093 was built, it used Autobleu parts. The Veloce II manifold was used in the 1093. Unlike the 4CV 1063, the 1093 was only delivered fully assembled, and was not available as a kit.

The 1093's Autobleu-enhanced engine so impressed Robert LaMaison, the Renault executive in charge of American sales who had a 1093 as his personal car, that he arranged for the Dauphines sold in the American market to receive the same parts. Cars for the US market had to meet a certain specification, called Amélioration "Grand Tourisme" ("Grand Touring" upgrade) by Autobleu. The Autobleu manifolds on US cars were later dropped as a cost-saving measure.

A variety of other parts were produced. Autobleu made cast alloy sumps. They offered a steering rack with a high-ratio pinion to reduce the number of turns lock-to-lock. They developed a kit that converted a floor-shift Dauphine to column shift. And in a departure from their usual mechanical products, in 1964 the company debuted a quad-headlamp conversion for the R8, one year ahead of a similar revision offered by Renault.

Autobleu also sold complete engine upgrade kits. Their "Type 40" kit included an Autobleu "tête bleue" cylinder head, an Autobleu "Rocket" camshaft, a Stelvio manifold, a Solex 32 PICBT carburettor, an air filter, a custom distributor, an Autobleu alloy rocker cover and a two-outlet exhaust. The advertised power is 40 hp.

== Other applications ==
Autobleu supplied manifolds for some tractor models in Renault's agricultural product lineup.

The company also produced a line of manifolds and exhausts for engines used in powerboats, under the Autobleu Marine name. Some Autobleu marine conversions were based on Renault engines, while others were based on Peugeot engines.

== Car models ==
=== Autobleu Simca ===
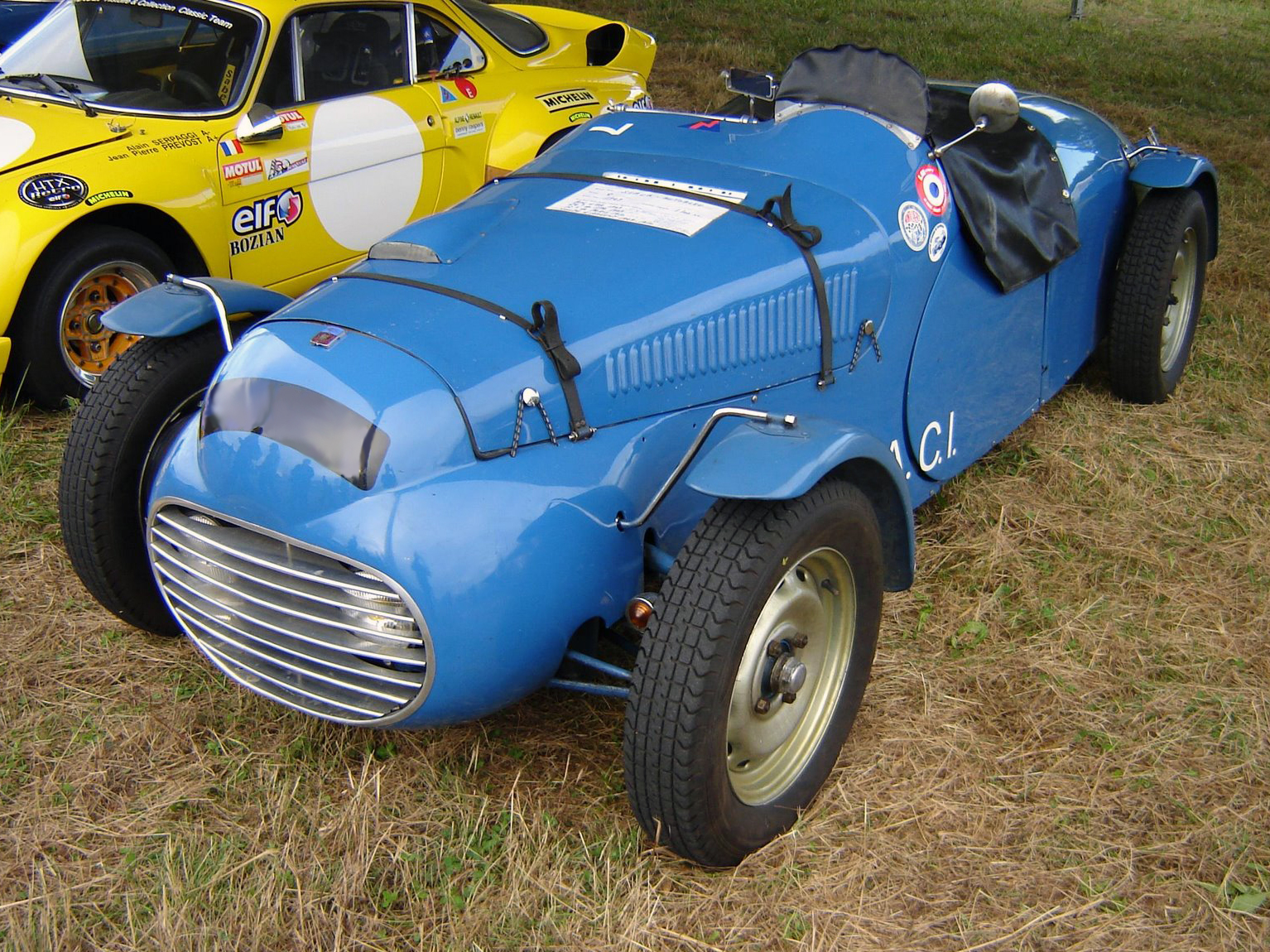
Autobleu Simca

Although Autobleu was not formally established until 1950, a cycle fendered racing Special called the Autobleu Simca dates back to 1948. This car was built on a Simca 8 Type HS racing chassis, and bodied by Carrosserie Autobleu. The Autobleu Simca appeared in the 1949 Bol d'Or automobile. Driven by Just-Emile Vernet, it won the 1100 cc class, and placed third overall. After appearing in several races during 1949 and 1950, the car was sold to l'AGACI, who used it in their racing school based at Monthlèry.

The car was rediscovered at Monthlèry in 1966 by Jacques Potherat and Bernard Pigelet, and sold shortly after to Jacques Picard. The car saw light road use, and then was displayed in Picard's showroom for over thirty years. It was sold again in 2000, then underwent a restoration that lasted until 2005.

=== Autobleu Renault 4CV ===
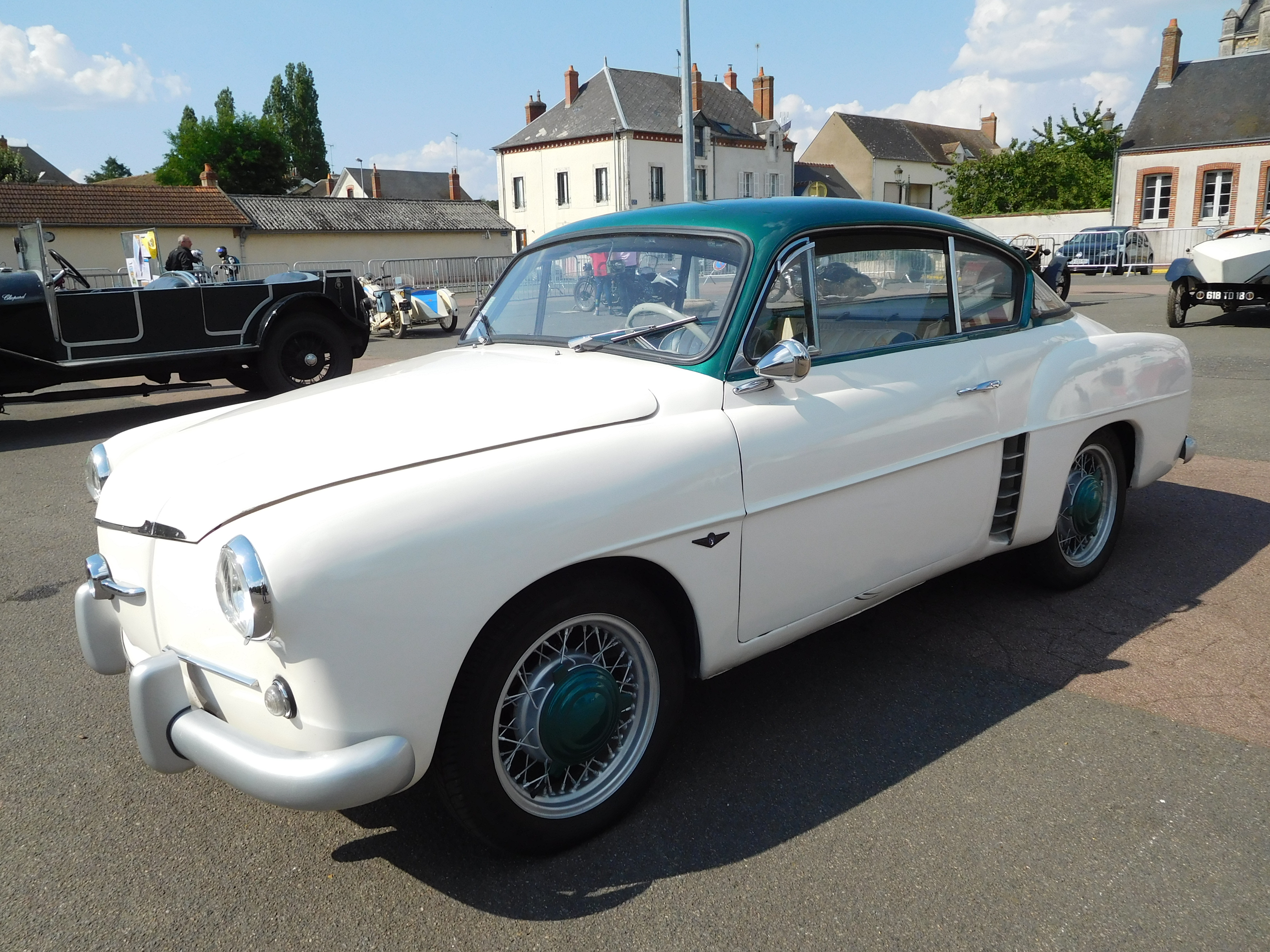
A 1955 Autobleu Renault 4CV

In May 1953 Autobleu unveiled a custom bodied 4CV-based luxury coupé. The car was the result of a trip to Cannes by Mestivier and Lepeytre in August 1952. While there the two attended a concours délégance and noticed a Lancia with a body design done by Luigi Sègre and Felice Mario Boano of Carrozzeria Ghia in Turin. The four met at the 1952 Salon de l'Auto, where Mestivier and Lepeytre laid out their desire to build a stylish car based on 4CV mechanicals. Ghia delivered a prototype in May 1953. Renault's management was sufficiently impressed to offer Autobleu access to its sales channels. Two examples were on display at the 1953 Salon.

Autobleu's 4CV coupé was built on the 4CV's steel chassis, with aluminium bodywork. It had the same 2,100 mm (82.7 in) wheelbase as the 4CV but, at 3,750 mm (147.6 in), was approximately 90 mm (3.5 in) longer. It also inherited the rear-mounted, water-cooled 747 cc (45.6 cu in) Renault Billancourt engine from the 4CV, and its 3-speed manual transaxle. In the coupé, power output was 25 hp (19 kW), boosted in part by an Autobleu inlet manifold and a Solex carburettor. In later cars the 747 cc engine was replaced by the 845 cc (51.6 cu in) unit from the Dauphine. The emphasis was on style and elegance rather than on ultimate performance. A maximum speed of 115 km/h (71 mph) was claimed.

The Autobleu 4CV's body incorporated several futuristic styling cues, including prominent air inlets ahead of the rear wheel arches that were larger than those on the 4CV. Renault adopted a similar set of inlets for their Renault Dauphine model launched in 1956.

The Autobleu coupé went into production towards the end of 1953. To create the tooling to produce the bodies, Mestivier and Lepeytre approached a friend named Francis Guérin, who was also a coachbuilder, for help. Guérin proposed building the tooling using a synthetic resin called rezolin. The results were poor, and production lagged. A series of carrosserie took turns building bodies for the car, including Figoni et Falaschi, and Carrosserie Pourtout. Finally, in 1956, Henri Chapron became the supplier of the coupé's body. Chapron developed a convertible version of the car the same year. Figoni repurposed a surplus rear end from an Autobleu coupé into a different car called the Simca 9 Sport Figoni

Total production of the Autobleu Renault 4CV is usually estimated to have been 80 cars.

=== Autobleu Renault Frégate ===
The company commissioned a single copy of a larger model based on the chassis of the Renault Frégate. This car was also styled by Boano, now working in his own carrozzeria. The engine in this prototype was tuned by Abarth, and was mated to a 4-speed transmission. The Autobleu Renault Frégate debuted at the 1955 Turin Auto Show.

=== Autobleu Peugeot 204 GT ===
Peugeot launched their hardtop 204 model in 1965, and a cabriolet version in 1967. Advertising executive and automotive enthusiast Pierre Thiriot convinced Lepeytre to create a custom version of the car. Autobleu bought some of the earliest cabriolets in February 1967, and supplied them to the carrozzeria run by Pietro Frua to provide the basis of a new fastback coupé. Apart from the new roofline, the car was visibly distinguished from the factory model by the quad headlamps in front.

The 1,130 cc (69.0 cu in) XK engine was tuned by Moteur Moderne. It received a 40 mm Weber carburetor, custom exhaust, and new manifolds, raising power to 70 hp (52.2 kW), a 32% increase over the stock engine.

The Autobleu Peugeot 204 GT Frua Coupé debuted at the 1967 Geneva Motor Show. Carrying a premium price, and facing strong competition in the market, the Autobleu 204 GT coupé did not go into production.

=== Karts ===
Autobleu built a series of racing karts, with single-cylinder engines from Ydral. The Ydral Type H engine, with a horizontal cylinder, was used. Autobleu Karts were built from 1960 to 1963.

== Motor sports ==
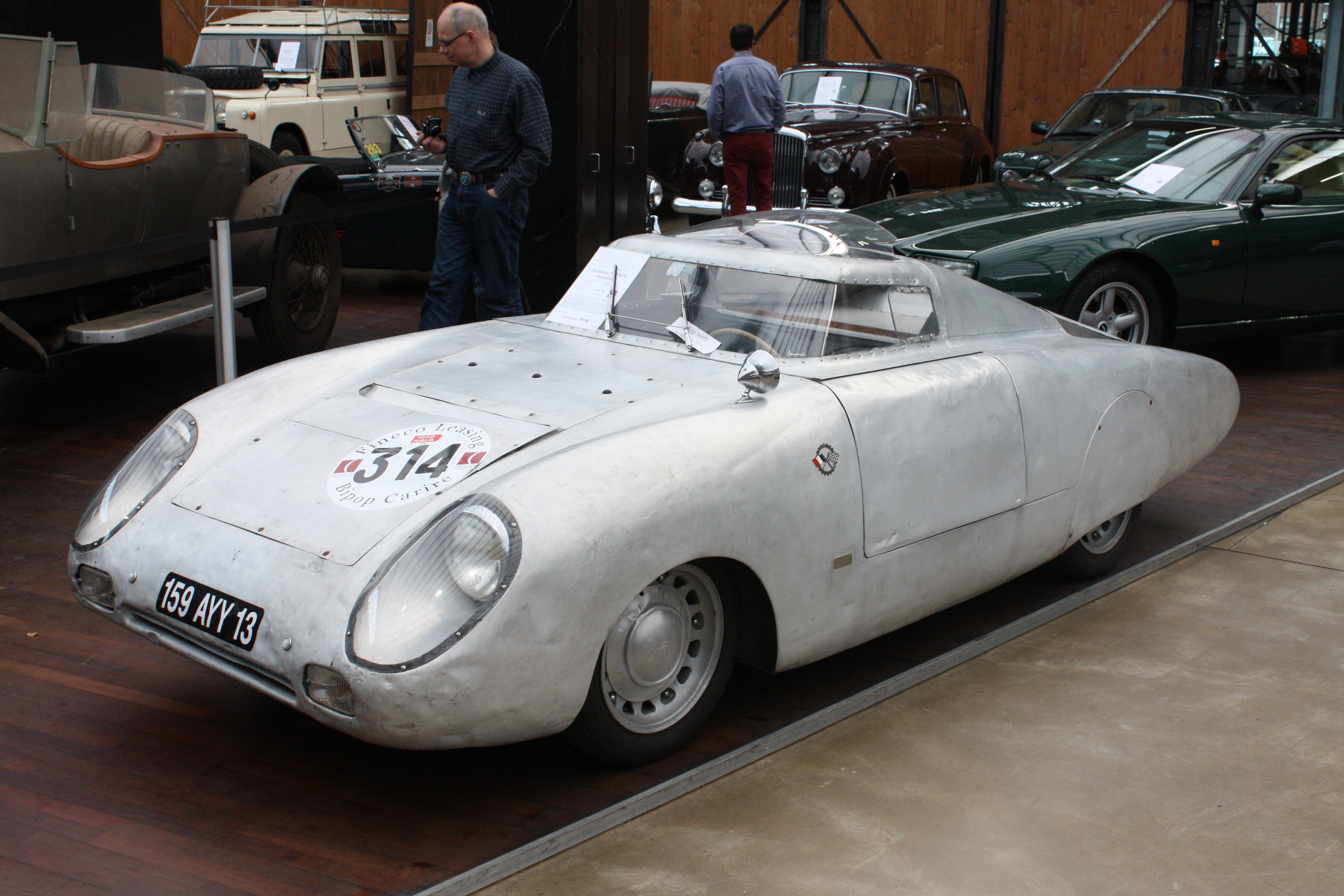
Autobleu 750 MM built for the 1954 Mille Miglia

For the 1954 Mille Miglia the company built the only works racing car it ever produced; the model 750 Mille Miles (MM). The engine was still the Renault Billancourt from the 4CV, but displacement was increased to 950 cc (58.0 cu in). The engine was tuned by Porsche, and developed 70 hp (52 kW). The streamlined body was developed by aeronautical engineer Marcel Riffard and built by Carrosserie G.T.R. In the 1954 race it was driven by Jean Sigrand and Jean Bianchi, and went out due to an accident. It was entered in the 1955 Mille Miglia, but it is unclear whether it raced. It then ran in the 1956 12 Hours of Reims. Driven by Lucien Bianchi and Christian Poirot, it finished eleventh in class, and twenty-first overall.

The Autobleu 750 MM was preceded by an earlier Riffard design for a car called the Renault-Riffard. Built on the chassis of an existing race car called the Guépard some time between 1950 and 1954, this compact barquette had full-width "tank" style bodywork with the side profile of an airfoil cross-section. The bodywork was designed by Riffard, and fabricated by Heuliez. Power came from a 4CV engine bored out to 904 cc (55.17 cu in), and fitted with an Autobleu cylinder head. The car's engine was ahead of the driver, and drove a rear axle in a front-engine, rear-wheel-drive layout.
