= Alfa Romeo Scarabeo II =

Overview
- Manufacturer: Alfa Romeo
- Also called: Junior Z 2000 Periscopio
- Production: 1973
- Assembly: Italy
- Designer: Ercole Spada at Zagato

Body and chassis
- Class: Concept car
- Body style: 2-seat coupé
- Layout: Rear mid-engine, rear-wheel-drive
- Platform: Alfa Romeo Alfetta

Powertrain
- Engine: 1,962 cc (119.7 cu in) DOHC inline-four engine
- Transmission: 5-speed manual

Chronology
- Predecessor: Alfa Romeo Scarabeo

The Alfa Romeo Scarabeo II is a concept car engineered by Giuseppe Busso for Alfa Romeo. The car uses a modified Alfa Romeo GT Junior Z body and it shares internals with the Alfa Romeo Alfetta and Alfa Romeo 2000 GT Veloce.

== Background ==
Despite the rejection of the Scarabeo project by Alfa Romeo management, Giuseppe Busso continued to push the development of a cheap racing-oriented coupé. After the introduction of the Alfetta in 1972, he saw an opportunity for a shared-platform car and began work on the Scarabeo II.

To reduce manufacturing costs, Busso designed the Scarabeo II to use the gearbox, rear axle, front suspension, and front chassis of the Alfetta. He also discarded the idea of a refined Alfa Romeo GTA engine, instead using the Inline-four engine from the Alfa Romeo 2000 GT Veloce. The rear of the chassis remained similar to the Scarabeo.

In a further effort to save development costs, a modified Alfa Romeo GT Junior Z body was used. The body was fitted with a wider track, a roof scoop, and metal grills instead of rear windows. Despite the impressive Price–performance ratio, the Scarabeo II failed to gain traction among the Alfa Romeo management. Doomed to rejection, the car was finished and subsequently put in the Alfa Romeo Museum, where it currently resides.
