= Officine Stampaggi Industriali =

Former car manufacturer

- Industry: Automobile
- Founded: 1960; 66 years ago
- Defunct: 1968; 58 years ago
- Fate: Design work folded into Fiat
- Headquarters: Turin, Italy
- Key people: Luigi Segre
- Products: Vehicles
- Number of employees: 2,000
- Parent: Carrozzeria Ghia

Officine Stampaggi Industriali or OSI, (literally "Industrial Stampings Workshops") was a coachbuilding company founded in 1960 in Turin by former Ghia president Luigi Segre and Arrigo Olivetti (1889–1977) from the Fergat company, a manufacturer of automotive components.

The objective was for OSI to be an independent design branch of Ghia, focusing on niche efforts. It produced custom-built cars based on Alfa Romeo, Fiat, and Ford models. In 1968, automobile design work was folded into Fiat, with some stamping operations later winding down.

== History ==
The company was positioned as an industrial coachbuilder. Rather than assembling mass-market vehicles, OSI's focus was "short runs of unique or upscale models designed by major styling houses". The 600-employee enterprise featured a 21,000 square metres (226,042 sq ft) facility with a capacity of about 50 cars per day with multiple assembly lines and a paint shop.

One of their first contracts was to build the bodyshells of the 1961 Innocenti 950 Spider, designed by a young Tom Tjaarda at Ghia's behest. It also produced the Gran Turismo 2+2 seater OSI 20M TS Coupé based on the German Ford Taunus 20M. The car was designed by Sergio Sartorelli, the designer of the Volkswagen Karmann Ghia Type 34 based on the Type 3. An estimated 2,200 to 3,500 examples of the OSI 20M TS coupés were produced.

The company was successful in its early years due to the Italian economy as well as consumer demand for unique, coachbuilt cars. It also broadened its offer in the mid 1960s beyond contract work for other automakers' models, to develop its own design and engineering projects.

The company also built the Ford Anglia Torino designed by Giovanni Michelotti: 10,007 examples of this model were sold in Italy, with an unknown additional number built for export to selected markets.

Segre died after complications following appendicitis (variously reported as an infection during recovery after successful removal of kidney stones) in 1963, leaving the rising company without its personal link to Ghia and Ford. Giacomo Bianco of Fergat replaced him. However, Bianco was unable to keep the company afloat as contracts dried up.

One of the final opportunities was with American Motors Corporation (AMC), which was expanding its overseas exports and operations. A proposed "Project Europa" was to adapt the AMC Cavalier concept into a compact, front-wheel-drive "world car" for international markets. Officine Stampaggi Industriali provided AMC an unofficial quote of $3.5 million for tooling, fixtures, and other costs to produce between 25,000 and 100,000 cars per year. However, the project was not realized.

Business consolidation and globalization during the late 1960s impacted small automakers. The large companies moved design and limited-production work in-house or partnered with more financially stable suppliers.

One of OSI's final proposals for small-series production in 1966 was the two-seat, tubular chassis, plastic-bodied Scarabeo with an Alfa Romeo Giulia GTA drivetrain. Sartorelli designed a radical catamaran-style racecar to enter the 1968 24 Hours of LeMans, the 1967 OSI Bisiluro Silver Fox, but participation was canceled due to the firm's poor financial condition in 1967.

In 1966, 2,000 employees had to be laid off, and OSI car production ended in December 1967. Bianco was fired, and Sartorelli was charged with winding down operations, incorporating the OSI design office with that of Fiat's in May 1968. The company remained active as a producer of steel pressings and industrial equipment.

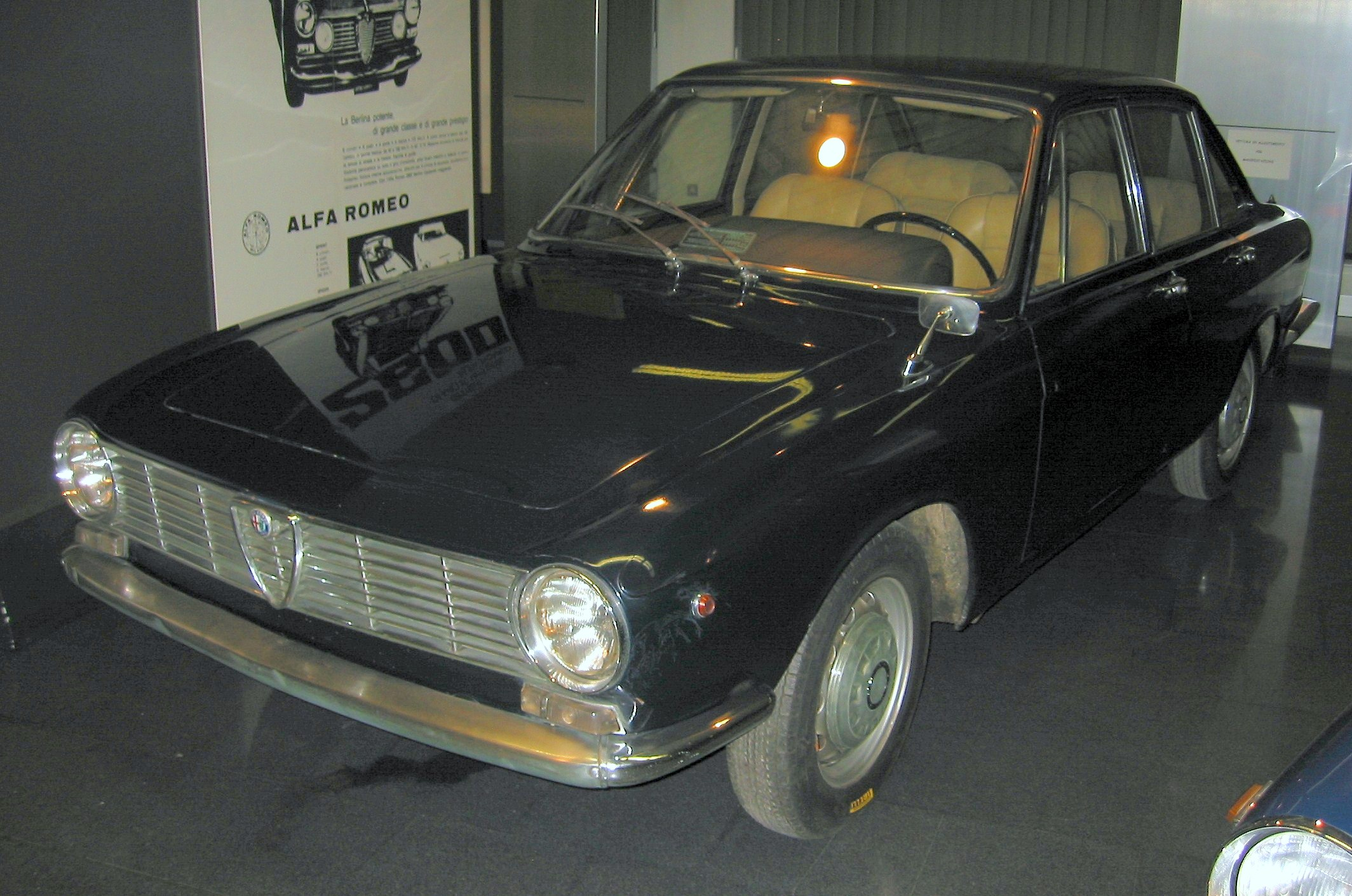
Alfa Romeo 2600 Berlina de Luxe 1965 by OSI

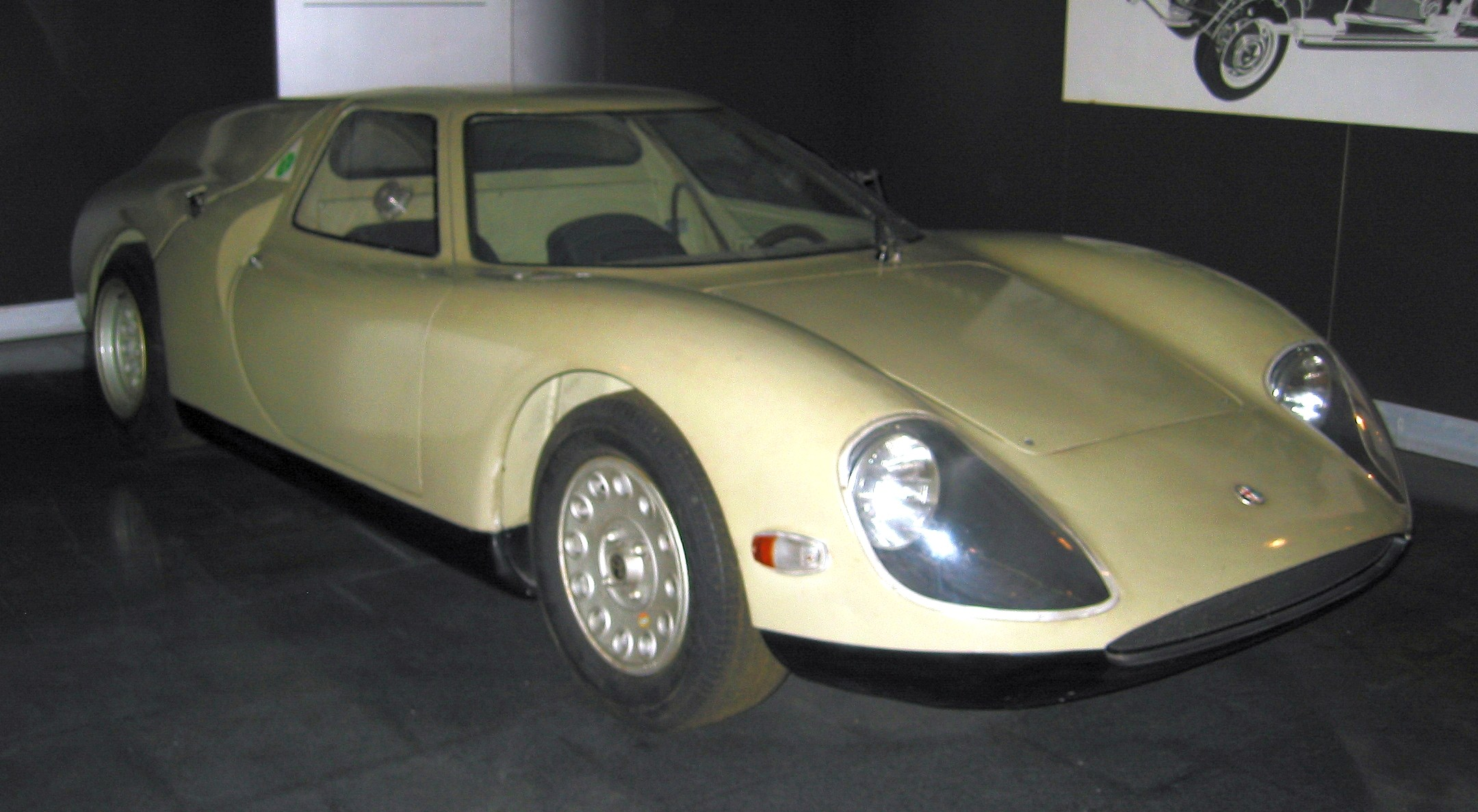
Alfa Romeo Scarabeo 1966 by OSI

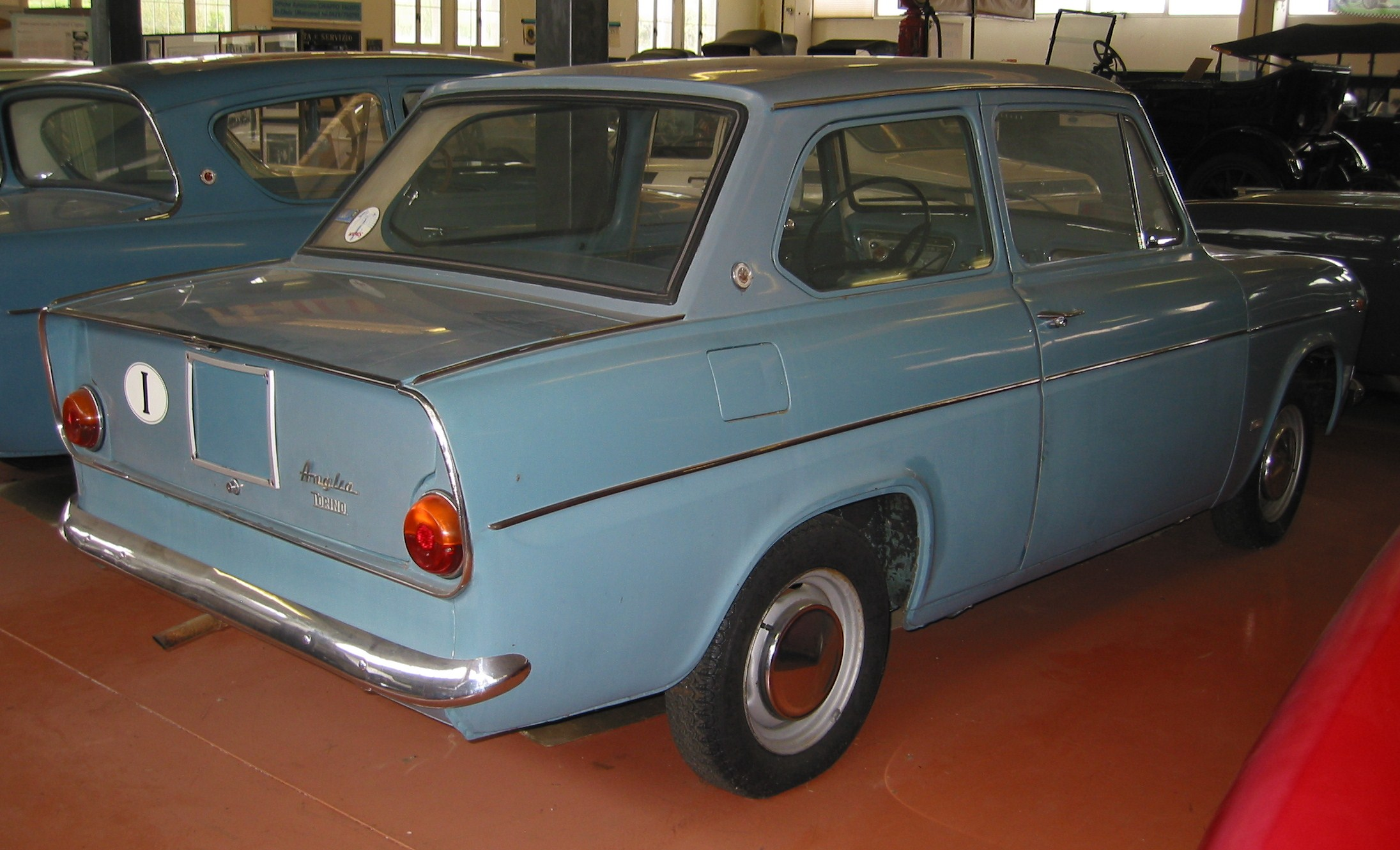
Ford Anglia Torino by OSI

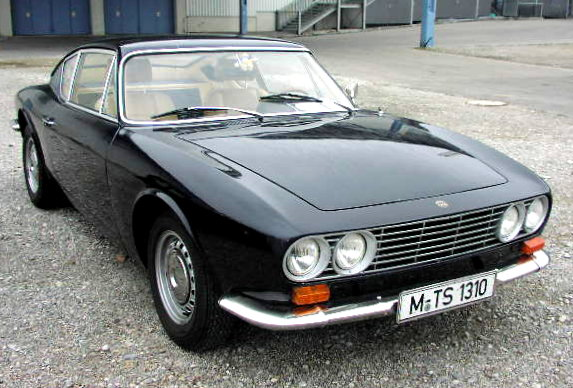
OSI-Ford 20 M TS

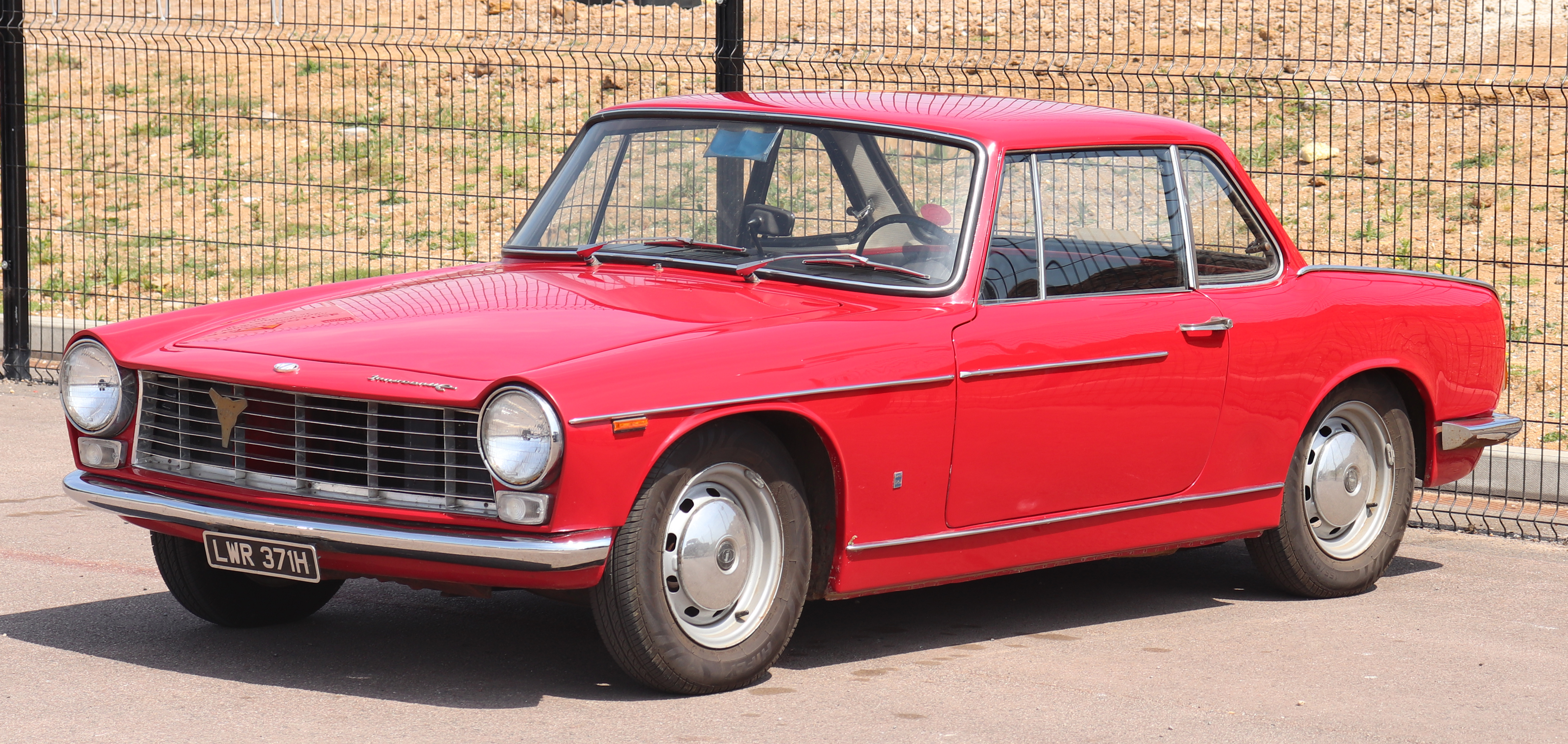
Innocenti C coupé
