= OSI-Ford 20 M TS =

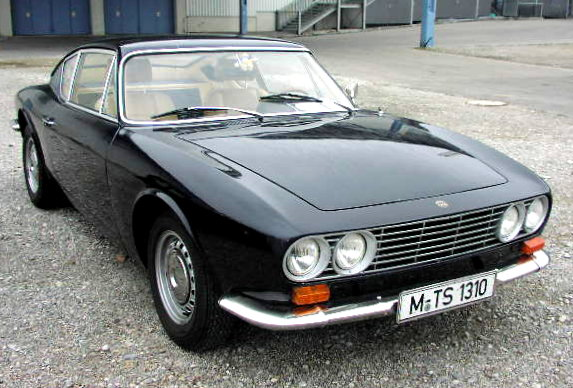

Overview
- Manufacturer: Officine Stampaggi Industriali
- Production: 1967-1968
- Designer: Sergio Sartorelli

Body and chassis
- Class: Sports car, coupe
- Layout: FR layout

Powertrain
- Engine: 2.0 L V6; 2.3 L V6

Dimensions
- Wheelbase: 2,705 mm (106.5 in)
- Length: 4,670 mm (183.9 in)
- Width: 1,808 mm (71.2 in)
- Height: 1,340 mm (52.8 in)
- Curb weight: 1,150 kg (2,535 lb)

The OSI-Ford 20 M TS is a coupe produced by the Italian car manufacturer Officine Stampaggi Industriali (abbreviated OSI).

== Description ==
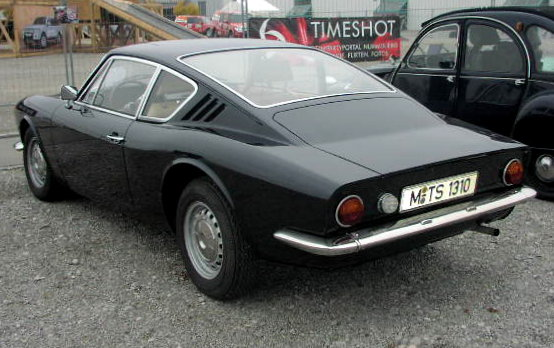
Rear view

Sergio Sartorelli, who also designed the Volkswagen Karmann Ghia Type 34, was responsible for the design in 1965. The vehicle was technically based on the Ford 20M and was manufactured between 1967 and 1968. There were 870 cars with the two-liter V6 engine and 409 with the 2.3-liter V6 imported into West Germany, at prices of 14,900 DM and 15,200 DM respectively. A unique OSI Ford convertible was shown at the 1967 Paris Salon. In 1968 OSI went into bankruptcy.

Since 1987, the OSI Owners Association in Germany with reproductions and annual meetings cares about the legacy of OSI. Sources vary on the total number of cars made: some suggest 2,200, others 3,500, while only around 200 examples are known to exist today.
