= Alfa Romeo Scarabeo =

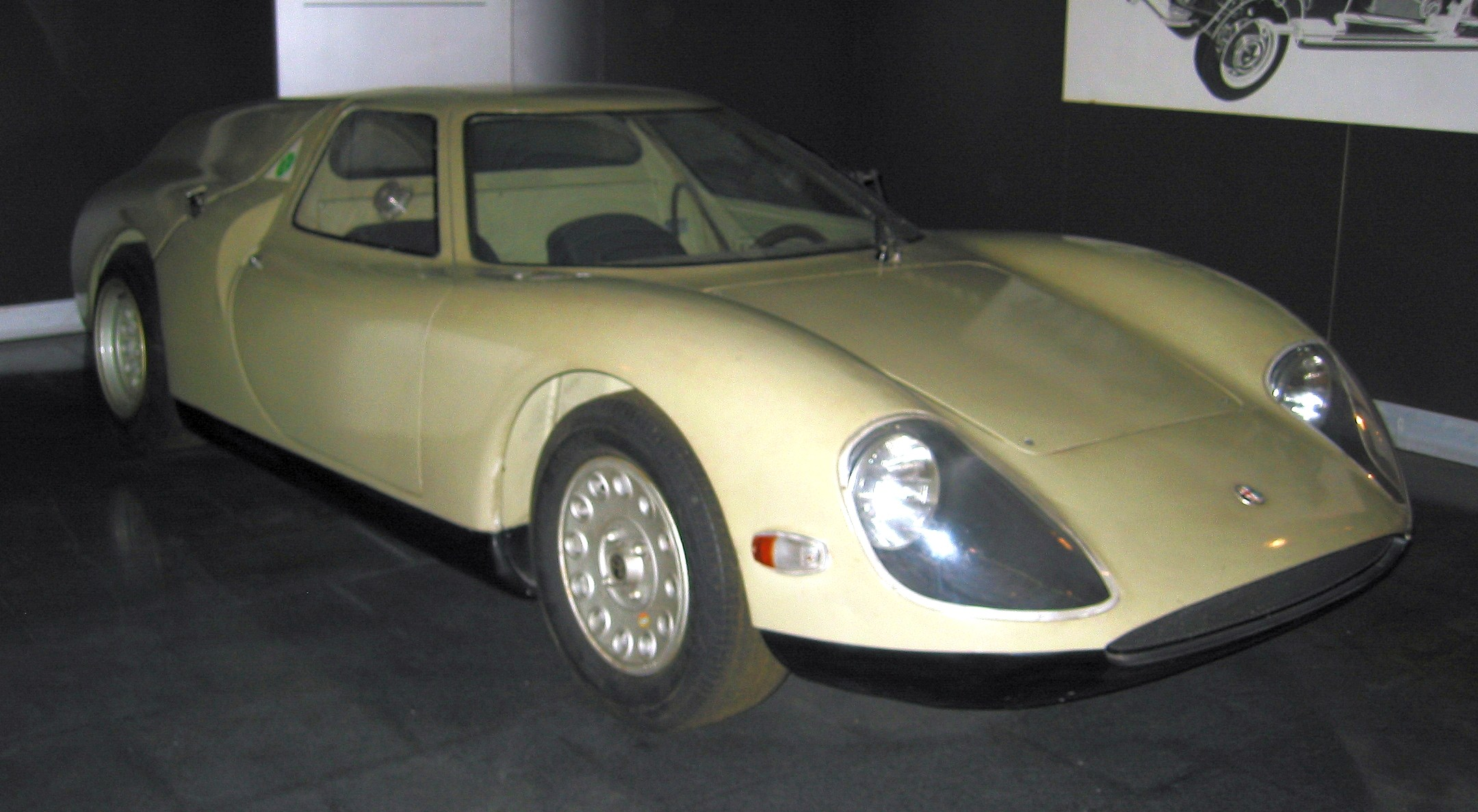

Overview
- Manufacturer: Alfa Romeo
- Production: 1966; 3 made
- Assembly: Italy
- Designer: Sergio Sartorelli at OSI

Body and chassis
- Class: Concept car
- Body style: 2-seat coupé
- Layout: Rear mid-engine, rear-wheel-drive
- Platform: Alfa Romeo Tipo 33
- Doors: Canopy (first)

Powertrain
- Engine: 1,570 cc (95.8 cu in) DOHC Inline-four engine
- Transmission: 5-speed manual

Dimensions
- Length: 3,720 mm (146.5 in)
- Width: 1,560 mm (61.4 in)
- Height: 1,020 mm (40.2 in)
- Kerb weight: 700 kg (1,543.2 lb)

Chronology
- Successor: Alfa Romeo Scarabeo II

The Alfa Romeo Scarabeo is a concept car engineered by Giuseppe Busso and Orazio Satta Puliga for Alfa Romeo, with a body designed by Sergio Sartorelli at Officine Stampaggi Industriali. The car debuted at the Paris Motor Show in 1966.

== Background ==
After the Alfa Romeo Tipo 33 project was passed on to Autodelta, Giuseppe Busso proposed a new rear-engined sports car to Orazio Satta Puliga and his design team. The car was to use the same tubular chassis of the Tipo 33, but it was to be cheaper and lighter than previous designs.

The Scarabeo project was dropped in favor of a full racing program at Autodelta. The second and third prototype currently reside at the Alfa Romeo Museum.

== Specifications ==
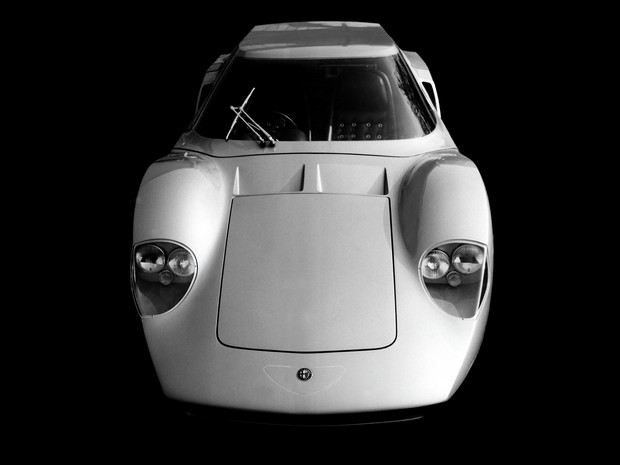
The first concept finished in silver

The Scarabeo is a rear-mid-engined, 2-seat coupé-styled prototype vehicle. In an effort to save costs, the suspension was based on the Renault R8 and the engine was taken from the Alfa Romeo GTA. The front axle has a length of 131 cm (51.57 inches) while the rear axle is an inch longer at 132 cm (51.97 inches). It's powered by a 1,570 cc inline four-cylinder, which features a DOHC (double overhead camshaft) design with double chain control, as well as a cylinder block and head that are made out of light-alloy. The Scarabeo is petrol-powered and uses a 2 Weber carb fuel system. It produces a maximum of 115 bhp (86 kW) and 142 N⋅m (105 lb⋅ft) of torque at 6000 rpm. The Scarabeo can accelerate from 0-60 mph (97 km/h) in 7 seconds and 0–100 km/h (62 mph) in 7.4 seconds. The car will reach its top speed of 200 km/h (124 mph) in 51.9 seconds and has a quarter-mile time of 15.6 seconds. A five-speed manual gearbox sends power to the rear wheels. To brake, the vehicle has brake discs on the front and rear wheels. The engine has eight valves and a compression ratio of 9.70:1. The engine, clutch, and gearbox (in one block) were mounted vertically and transversely on the left-handed side to allow the side of the engine with the hot exhaust to be directed away from the cockpit and at the rear of the car. The carburetors are located directly behind the left-handed seat due to this placement of the engine. The vehicle was made as a right-hand drive to distance the driver from the engine's loud carburetors and distribute the weight inside the vehicle more efficiently for better handling.

== Body design and features ==
One of the things the Sccarabeo prototype was used for was to explore how seating the driver in the vehicle as far back as possible would affect their ability to control the car. The belief was that the further back the driver sat, the better the driver would be able to assess the behavior of the vehicle and therefore control it. The vehicle's noticeably thin and long front can be dedicated to the testing of this principle. One of the features unique to this concept car is the lack of doors. The cockpit is accessed by tipping the forward hinged canopy. A lack of doors allows for a panoramic windscreen that is accompanied by one windshield wiper. The second prototype of the Scarabeo, was more conventional with two side doors, a conventional windscreen, and left-hand drive. As a result, the body style is significantly less angular, and thicker in the front of the car than the original prototype Scarabeo. The first two prototypes have a Kamm tail rear at the end of the shell that encases the mechanics of the car. This design kept with the aerodynamics and styling of the era. The third and final Alfa Romeo Scarabeo was an experimental prototype and styled to be a sports "Barchetta" or open body car. This prototype was never finished which is why the engine remains exposed at the rear of the car.

== Innovative features ==
Not only was this prototype vehicle designed to test the relationship between the driver's position and their ability to control the vehicle, but a new chassis approach was designed and tested on the Alfa Romeo Scarabeo. The large-diameter tubular chassis was H-framed and later used in Alfa Romeo's Tipo 33. Those same large-diameter tubes were also incorporated in the fuel tanks in both the Alfa Romeo Scarabeo and Tipo 33. The tubes created a system that spread the liquid's weight around the car more equally for better weight distribution and balance. In the Scarabeo, the fuel tanks are located in the longitudinal members on the sides of the cockpit. This fuel tank design made space available at the rear of the vehicle to mount the engine transversely. Other key features in the Alfa Romeo Scarabeo are that the clutch and gearbox were included in the engine block, the rear brakes were centrally located, and the differential was an integral unit.
