= Luigi Segre =

Italian automotive designer

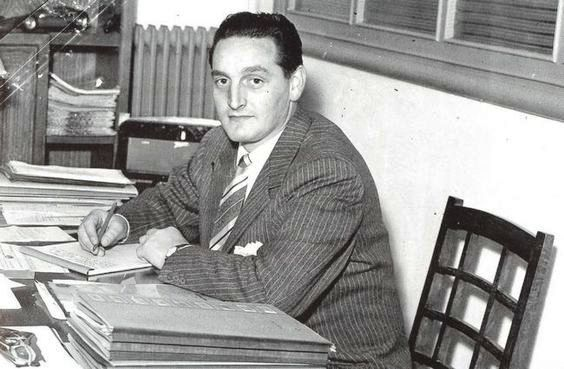
- Born: 8 November 1919; Naples, Italy
- Died: 28 February 1963 (aged 43); Turin, Italy
- Other name: Gigi
- Occupations: Automotive designer and businessman
- Known for: Designer and owner at Carrozzeria Ghia and OSI

Luigi "Gigi" Segre (8 November 1919 – 28 February 1963) was an Italian automotive designer noted for his business and engineering acumen during his stewardship and ownership of Carrozzeria Ghia (1953–63), one of an Italy's premier automobile design and coachbuilders.

Segre is widely associated with his prominent role in the genesis of the Volkswagen Karmann Ghia – a car that reached a production of nearly a half million, and a car that noted designer Dick Teague called one of the "most beautifully designed products."

== Background ==
Segre began working at his father's construction business, only to have his career and education interrupted by the outbreak of World War II. Stationed in Naples on 8 September 1943, when the armistice was announced, Segre immediately voiced opposition to the German troops occupying the city – and participated in the Four days of Naples. When allied troops arrived, he made himself available to the US command, and after a brief training in Tunisia, parachuting into the Canavese, he became an official liaison between the Office of Strategic Services (OSS) – precursor to the modern CIA – and partisan groups working in the Piedmont. He also worked to repatriate former Italian soldiers from France. It was during this period, Segre had begun to master English and become familiar with the American way of thinking.

Following positive recommendations from the Allied Command in the immediate post-war period, Segre was hired as a manager at Ford, graduated in engineering and subsequently moving to Siata (Società Italiana Auto Trasformazioni Accessori) where he studied automotive design with Giorgio Ambrosini. In a brief racing career, Segre took 1949 and 1950 first place victories in the Mille Miglia Turismo 1100 class (in a Fiat 1100) – with teammate Gino Valenzano (1920–2011).

Segre married Luisa de Berto in 1955 and together they had sons Edmondo (1957-) and Silvio (1959-). Luigi Segre died suddenly and unexpectedly in a Turin clinic at age 43, during convalescence after successful removal of kidney stones. Doctors suspected Segre had contracted a viral infection during a recent business trip to Brazil, but at the time the hypothesis could not be confirmed. He left behind his wife, Luisa, and two sons, at the time 6- and 4-years old. In 1971, Luisa Segre opened a resort, La Meridiana, between Monaco and Portofino, as of 2018 operated by Edmondo Segre and his wife Alessandra.

== Career ==
Before turning thirty, Segre joined Carrozzeria Ghia in 1948, hired by Mario Boano as Commercial Director, then becoming a minority owner. Using his nickname "Gigi," he actively toured Italy, contacting and personally meeting all Ghia's dealers. Orders increased, his income tied to a percentage of orders. As the Carrozzeria's Director of Sales, Segre would leave to consummate a deal estimated at ten million, returning with a contract for thirty million.

Eventually, English-speaking Segre would travel to the United States to meet Chrysler's chief stylist Virgil Exner and CEO K. T. Keller. Segre served as Ghia's interlocutor as Boano did not speak English – leaving Segre to forge strong personal alliances with Exner and Chrysler while leaving Mario Boano in a diminished role within his own company. For Segre, a working alliance with Chrysler provided the valuable opportunity to elevate Carrozzeria Ghia's international stature. Exner in turn was able to quickly see actual prototypes of his studio's work – at a dramatically lower cost (e.g., one tenth to one twentieth) than Chrysler was producing its prototypes. Segre became full owner of Carrozzeria Ghia in 1954, after Mario Boano left over their differences – Boano wanting Ghia to focus on local work and Segre wanting to form international liaisons.

Segre developed contracts with Volkswagen, Renault, Fiat, Volvo and several others to continuously develop their show cars, as well as possible production models and facelifts. In 1953, Segre worked with Renault, when the company chairman, Pierre Lefaucheux, requested Ghia's assistance with the forthcoming Dauphine.

After modernizing Ghia, Segre realized further expansion could detrimentally affect Ghia's reputation as a prestigious artisanal workshop – subsequently founding a new company, controlled by Ghia, in partnership with Arrigo Olivetti (1889–1967). Inaugurated in 1960 in a new building adjacent to the main Ghia factory, Officine Stampaggi Industriali (OSI) relied heavily on the most modern equipment and techniques, with sheet metal stamping, painting, final assembly and various finish works – to satisfy client requirements without damaging Ghia's boutique image.

After Segre's death, his widow sold most of Ghia to Dominican dictator Ramfis Trujillo in 1965.

=== Karmann Ghia ===
Three companies and numerous individuals came together in the history of the Karmann Ghia. In the early 1950s, Volkswagen was producing its Volkswagen Beetle, and as post-war standards of living increased, executives at Volkswagen had toyed with adding a halo model to its range. Luigi Segre was committed to expanding the international reputation of Carrozzeria Ghia. And Wilhelm Karmann had overtaken his family coachbuilding firm Karmann and was eager to augment his contracts building Volkswagen's convertible models.

Segre and Karmann encountered each other at international automobile shows, and after an initial discussion prompted by Wilhelm Karmann, Segre secretly began working, obtaining a Volkswagen Beetle to use as a basis for a prototype – The Type I's were difficult to come by and Gian Paolo, Mario Boano's son, purchased one in Paris and drove it back to Turin. Ghia customized its platform, designed the initial prototype and in five months constructed the model.

Segre, again secretly, presented the model to Wilhelm Karmann one year after the initial discussion – late in 1953, in Paris, at the Societé France Motors factories (Volkswagen's dealership for France and the exclusive European dealer of Ghia-built Chrysler models). When Wilhelm Karmann saw the coupe, Karmann he said, "I'd like to build that!" As the head of Ghia, Segre singularly directed the project through conception and prototyping, delivering a feasible project that Willhelm Karmann both wanted to and could practically build – the project Willhelm Karmann would in turn present to Volkswagen.

The styling of the Karmann Ghia integrated work by Segre as well as Mario Boano, Sergio Coggiola and Giovanni Savonuzzi – and at various times they each took credit for the design. Furthermore, the design bore striking styling similarities to Virgil Exner's Chrysler d'Elegance and K-310 concepts, which Ghia had been tasked with prototyping – and which in turn reflected numerous cues and themes developed previously by Mario Boano. According to Virgil Exner's son, Virgil M. Exner Jr., Giovanni Savonuzzi was tasked with scaling down the full-sized d'Elegance, replacing "the Chrysler's egg-crate grille with a gentle, boat-like prow." Exner Jr. is further quoted as saying that the Karmann Ghia "was a direct, intentional swipe off the Chrysler d'Elegance. Givanni Savonuzzi was the engineer and designer who downsized the d'Elegance and made the Karmann Ghia out of it. Nobody minded it. It was wonderful".

The precise styling responsibilities were not well-documented at the time, before the passing of the various designers, further complicated by the overlapping work of the key players. A definitive individual attribution on Karmann Ghia's styling was never made.

Segre and Virgil Exner had become close professionally and personally, eventually traveling Europe together, with their families. Peter Grist wrote in his 2007 Exner biography that when Exner in 1955 eventually saw the Karmann Ghia, which cribbed heavily from his Chrysler d'Elegance, "he was pleased with the outcome and glad that one of his designs had made it into large-scale production". Chris Voss, a stylist in Exner's office, reported in 1993, that Exner considered the Karmann Ghia the ultimate form of flattery. Segre in turn sent Exner the first production Karmann Ghia imported into the state of Michigan, in gratitude.

After Volkswagen approved the design in November 1953, the Karmann Ghia debuted (at the 1955 Paris and Frankfurt auto shows and at the Kasino Hotel in Westfalia, Germany, on 14 July 1955) and went into production, first at Ghia and then in Osnabrück – ultimately to reach a production over 445,000, running 19 years virtually unchanged and easily becoming the most well-known project with which Segre was involved.

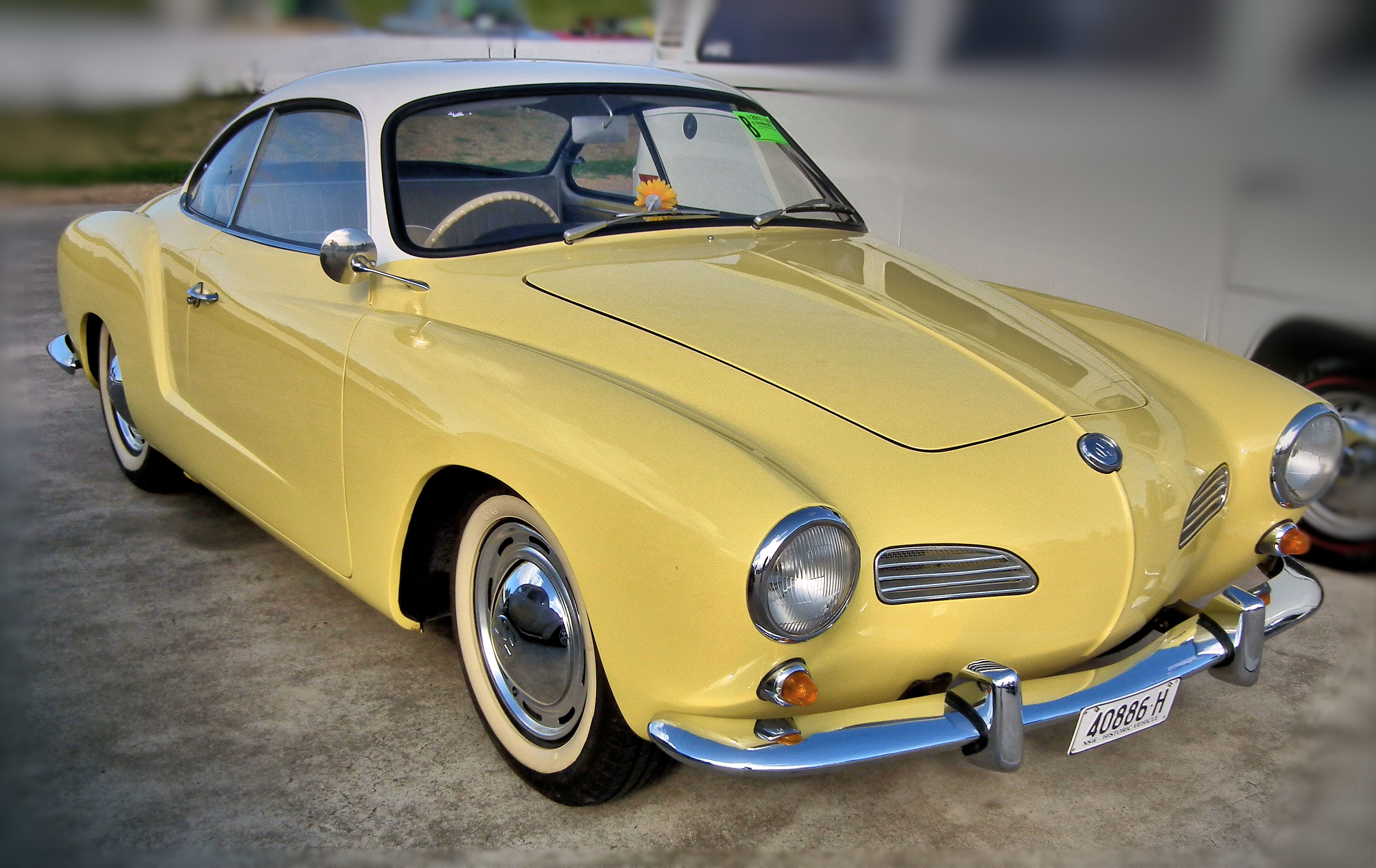
Karmann Ghia

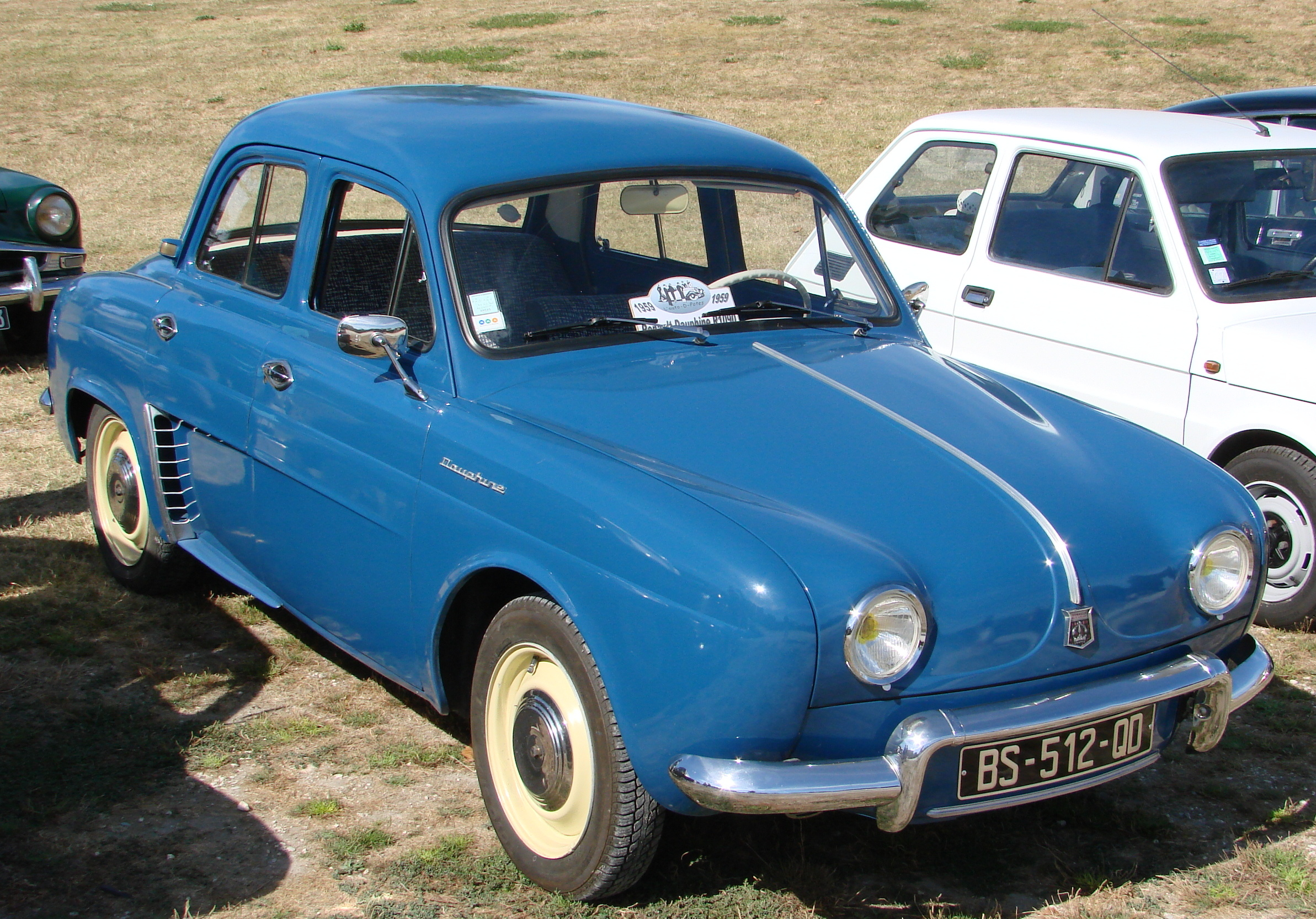
Renault Dauphine

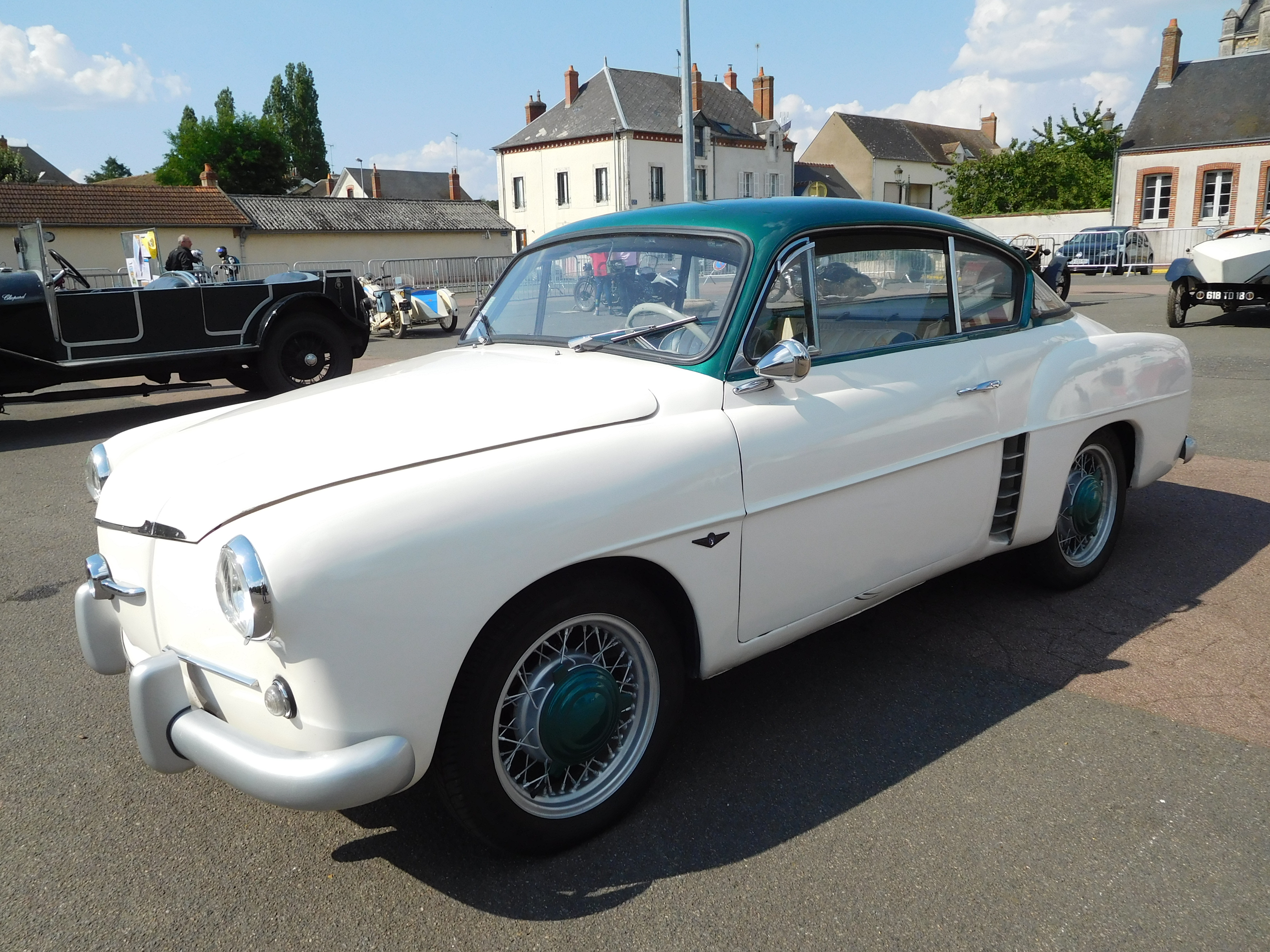
Autobleu 1955

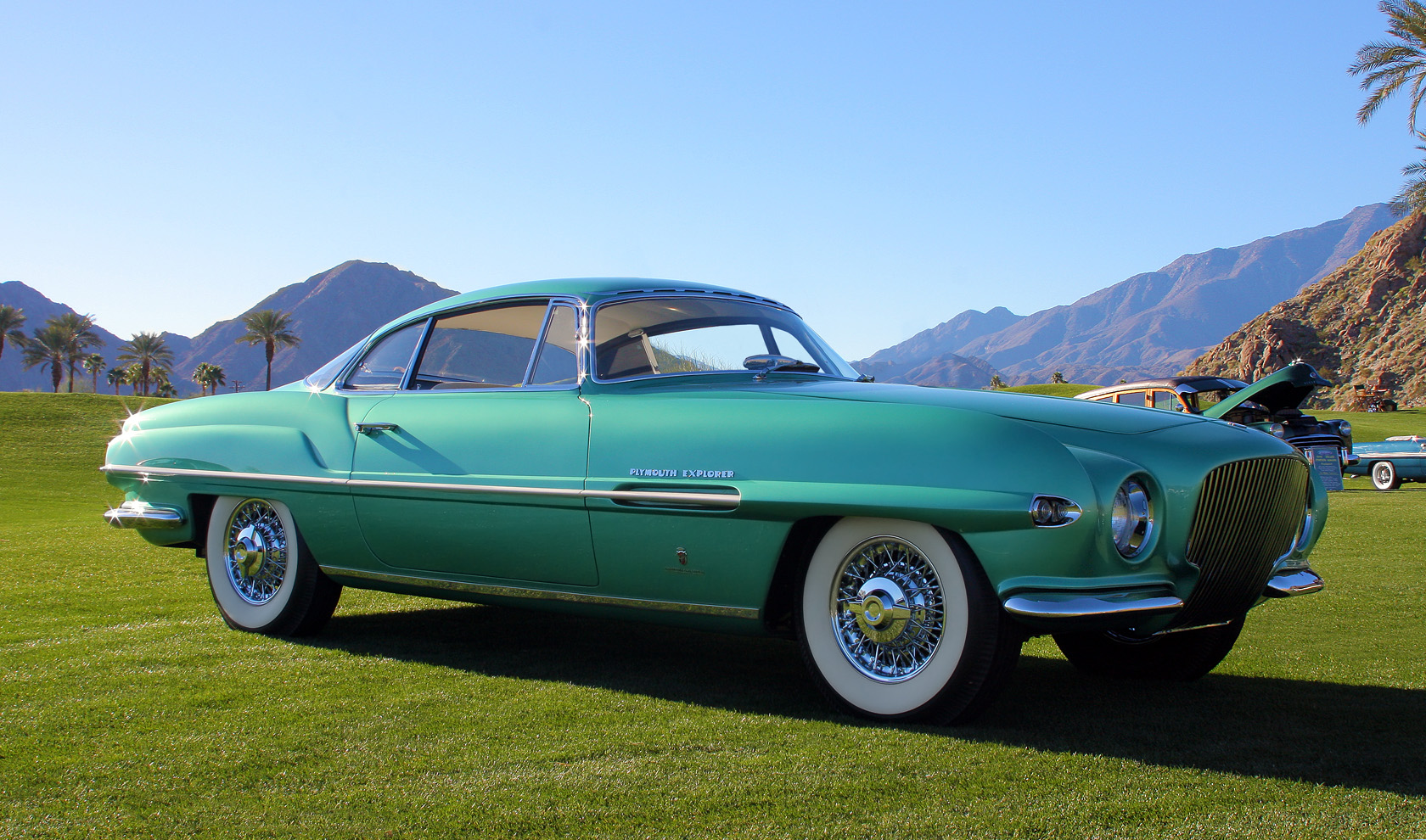
Plymouth Explorer concept car
