= Felice Mario Boano =

Italian automobiledesigner (1903–1989)

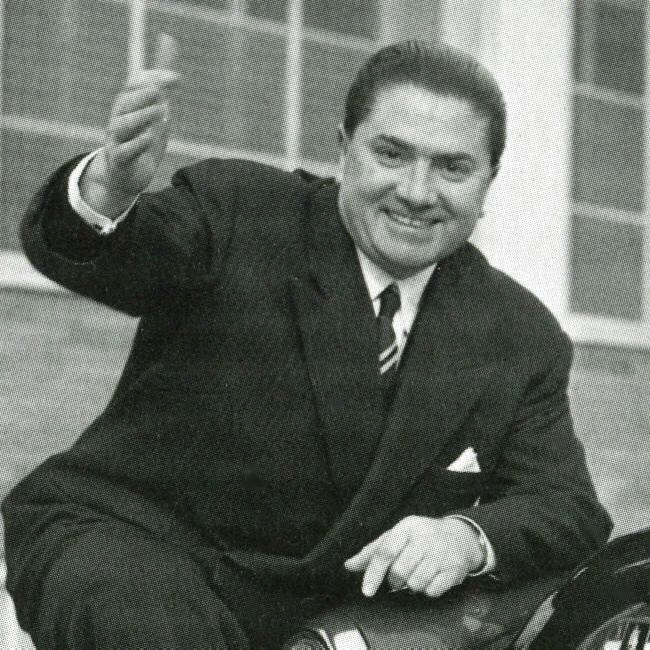
Mario Boano

Felice Mario Boano (1903 – 8 May 1989) was an Italian automobile designer and coachbuilder.

== Life ==
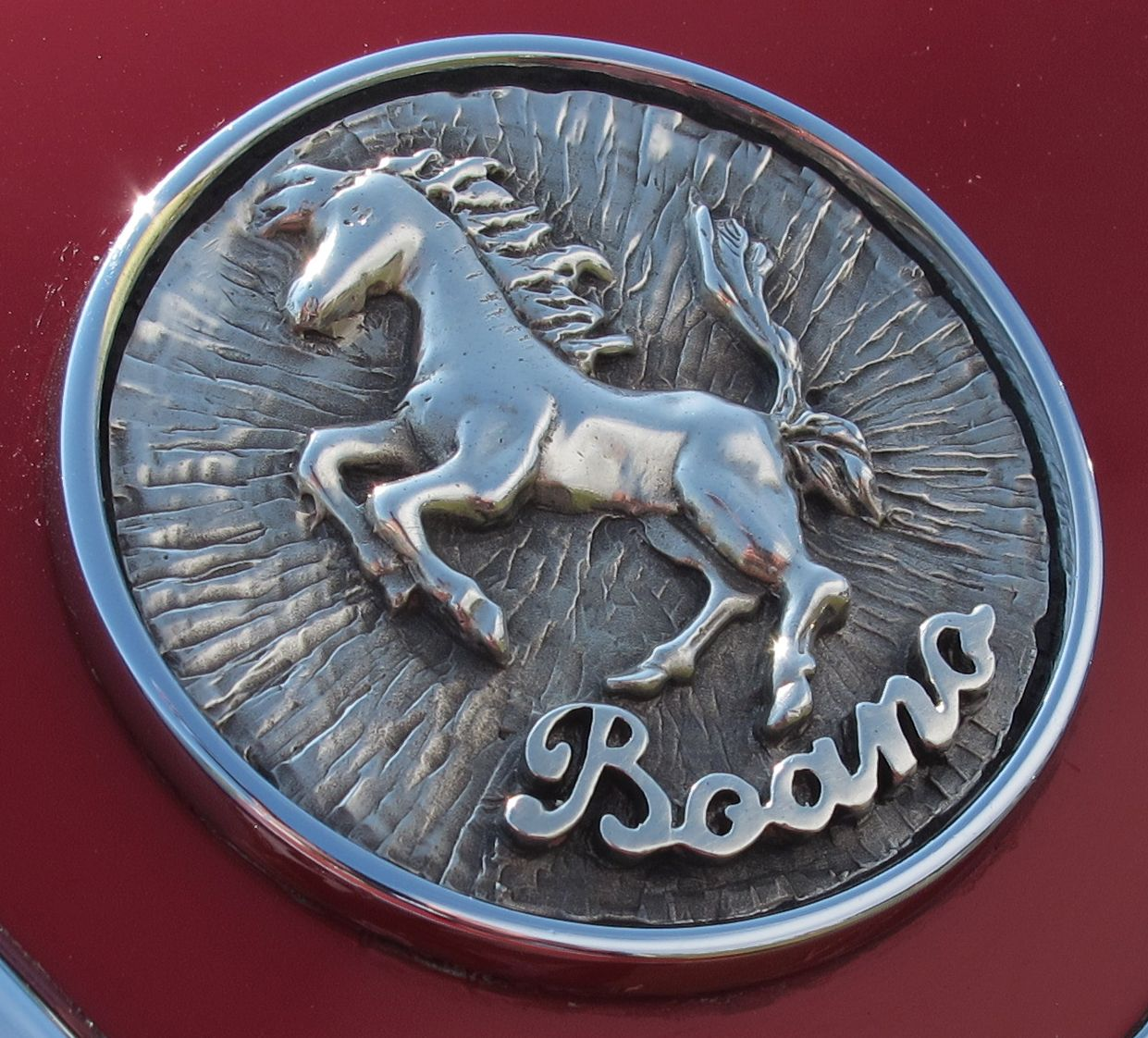
The badge of Carrozzeria Boano on the roof of a 1956 Ferrari Superamerica

He was born in Turin. He worked for Stabilimenti Farina in Turin before joining Pinin Farina in 1930.

In 1944 (with Giorgio Alberti), Boano bought the Carrozzeria Ghia in Turin when their friend Giacinto Ghia died. Boano and Luigi Segre were central in several low-roofline designs; the Alfa Romeo 2500 CC, Lancia Aurelia (1950), Karmann Ghia (1953), Chrysler K200, Alfa Romeo 1900SS, and some Ferrari 166 of berlinetta style. He is also credited with Lancia Aurelia GT coupé design.

In 1954 he founded Carrozzeria Boano in Grugliasco with his son Gian Paolo Boano (born 1930) who also had been with him while at Ghia. They took over some of the initial Ferrari 250 GT Coupé production from Pinin Farina. After only three years, Boano closed, and his son-in-law Ezio Ellena took over the remaining 50 units of 250 GT production in his Carrozzeria Ellena (1957–1966).

Starting in 1957, Boano worked under Dante Giacosa for Fiat in their Turin styling department, creating the Fiat 600 and the square style of Simca 1000. His son Gian Paolo Boano (b. 1930) succeeded him in 1959, as leader of the Centro Stile, Fiats styling department.

Mario Boano retired from Fiat in 1966. Gian Paolo remained with Fiat until 1988. Mario Boano died in Turin on 8 May 1989.

== Gallery ==
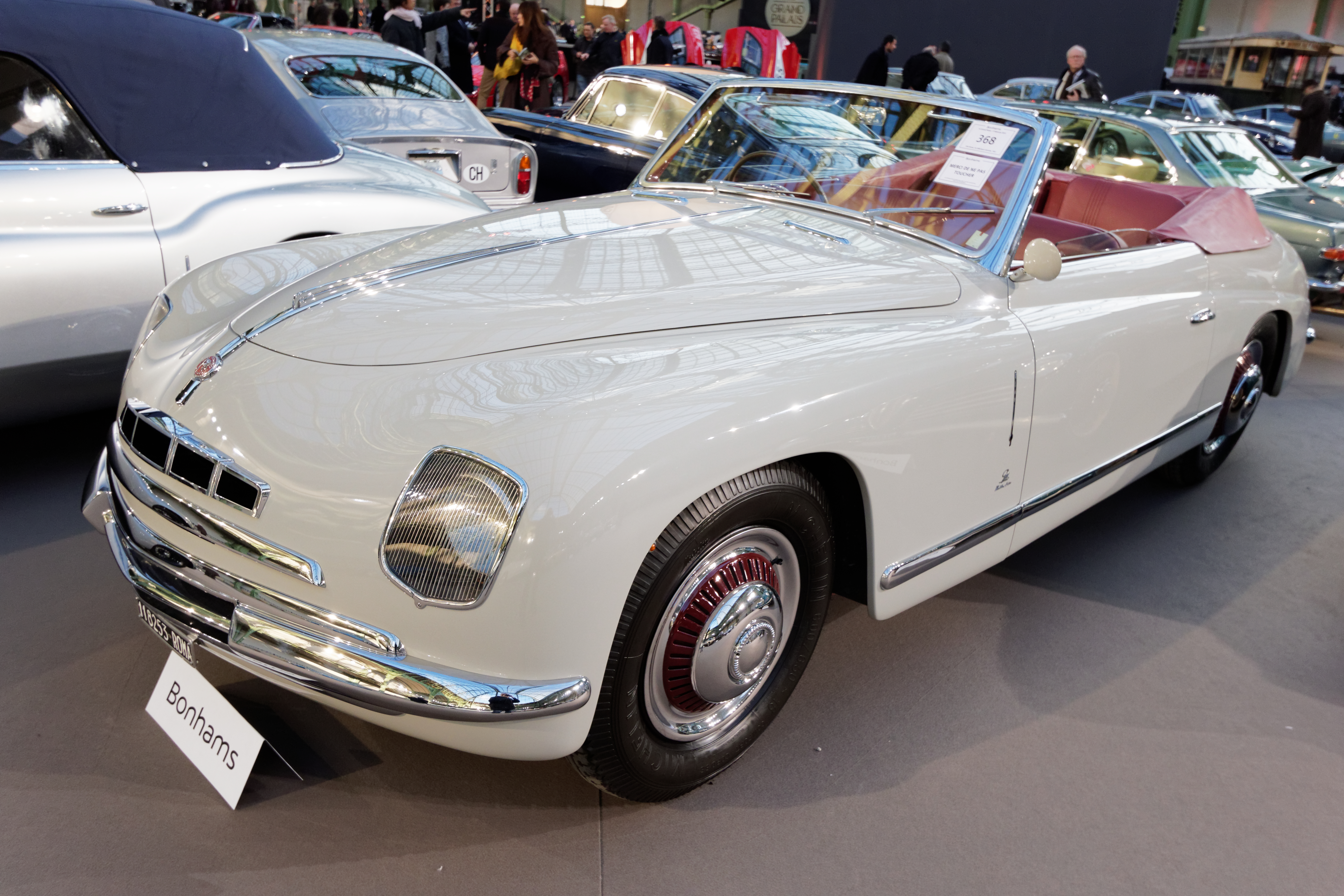
Alfa Romeo 6C 2500, 1947

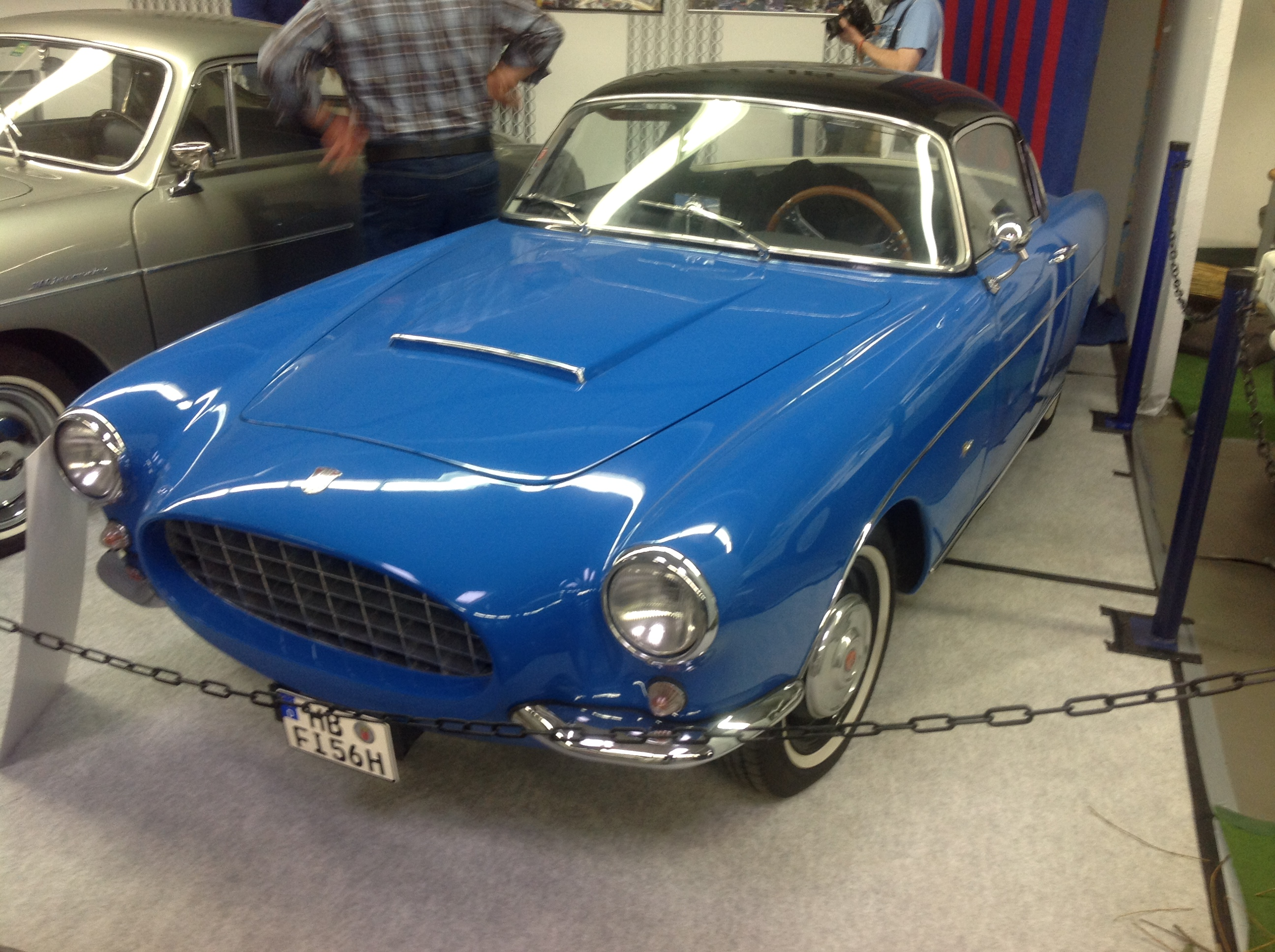
1956 Fiat 1100, customized by Boano

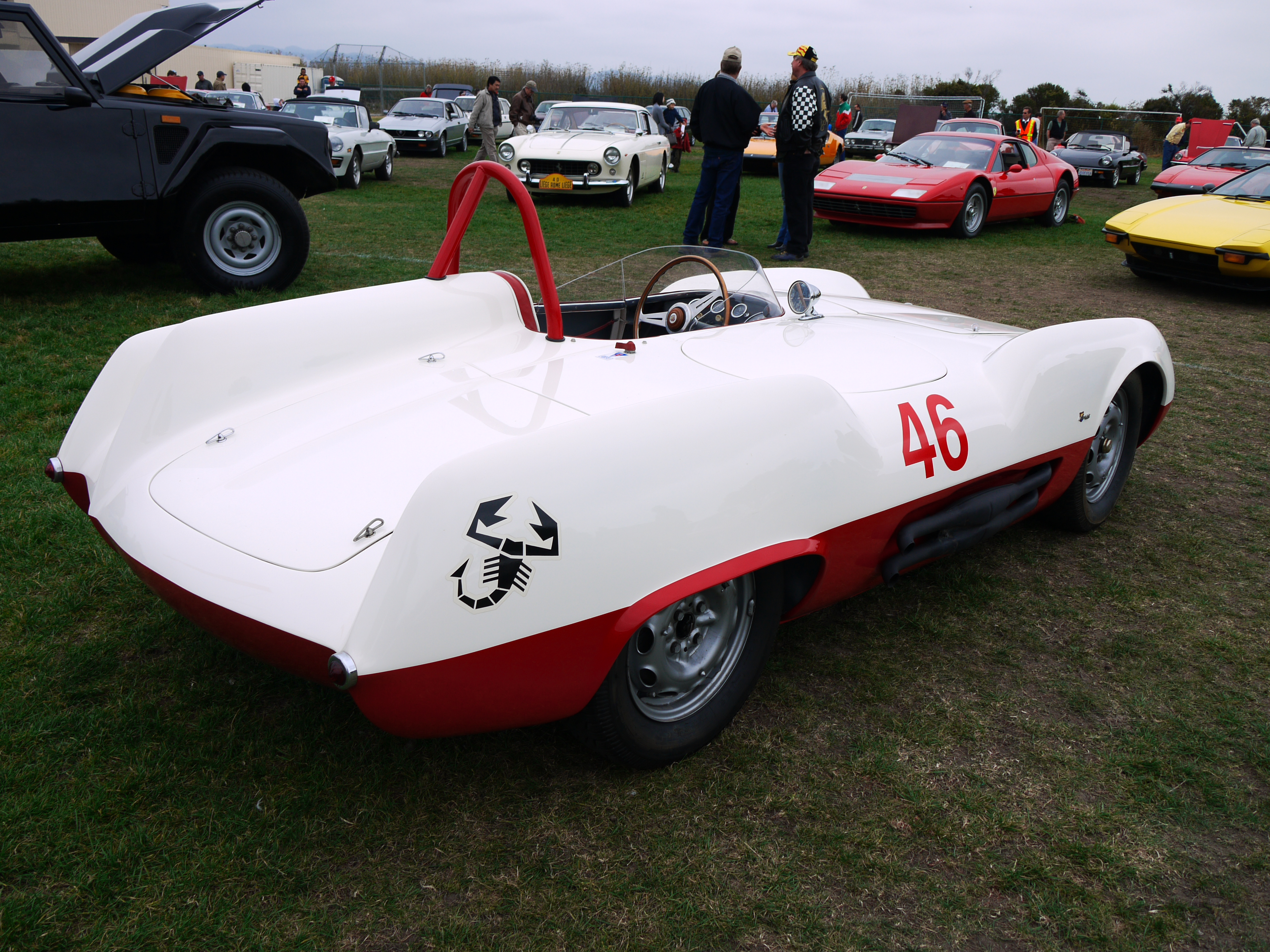
Abarth 207A Spyder, 1955

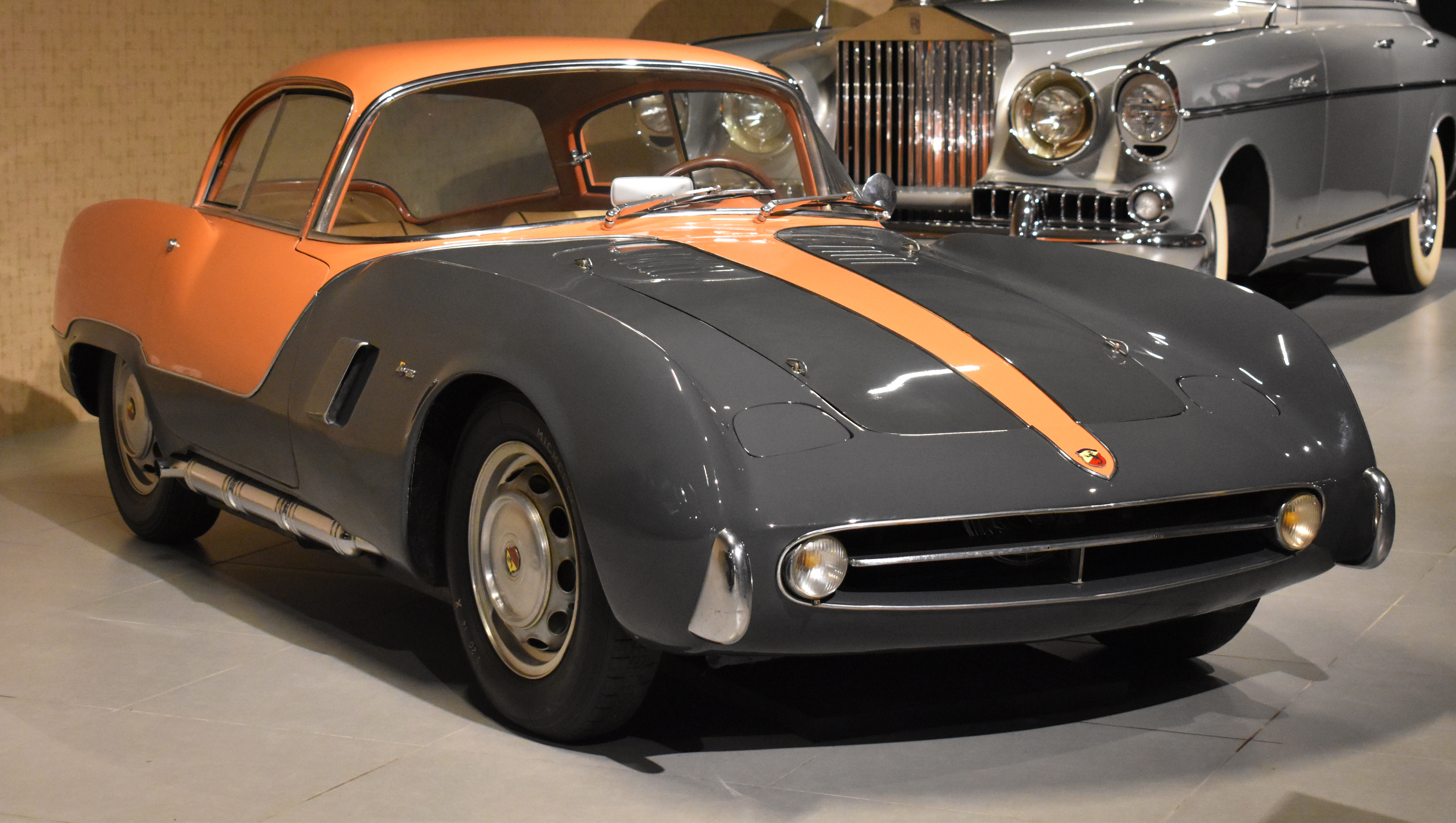
Abarth 209A Coupé, 1955

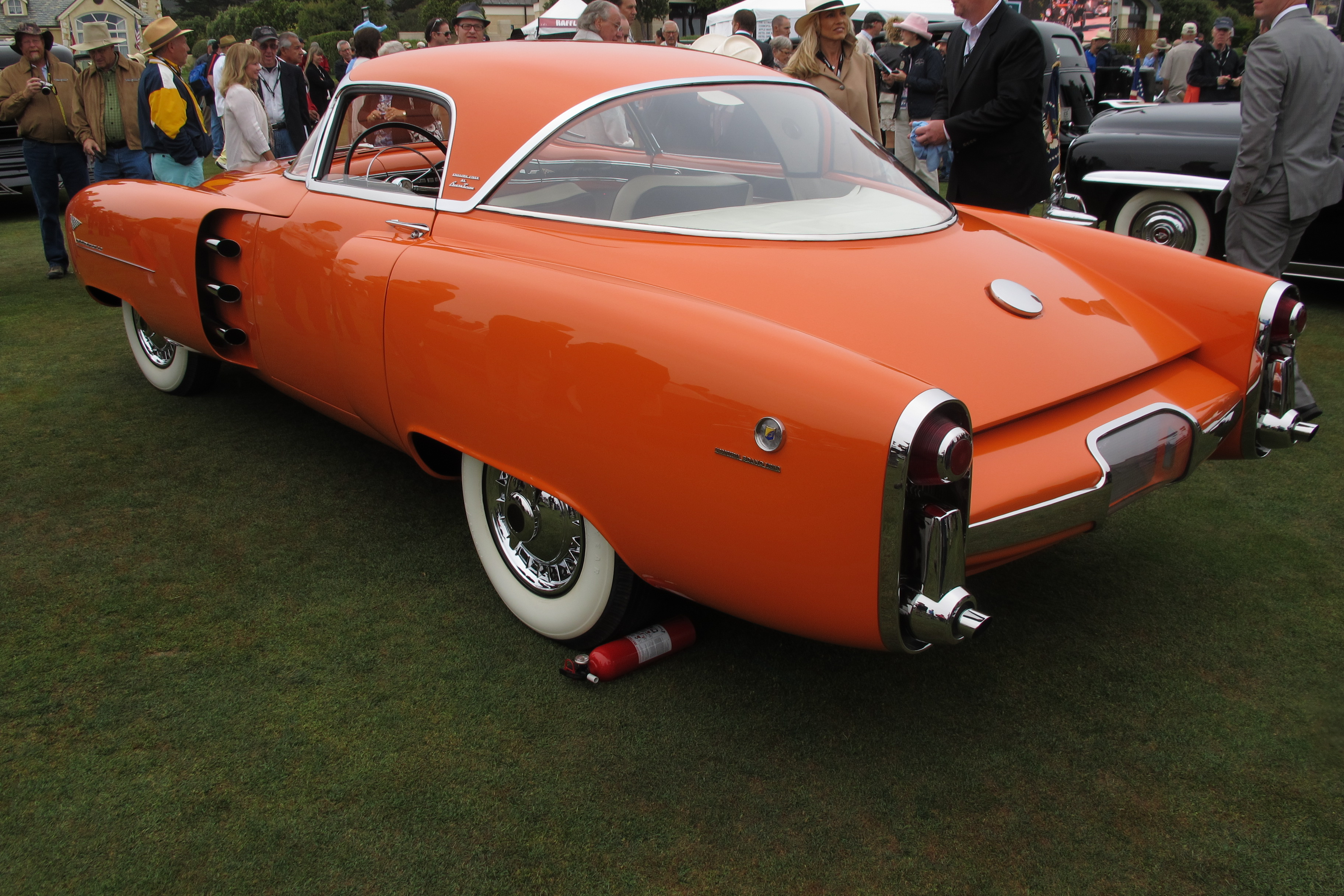
1955 Lincoln coupe "Indianapolis"

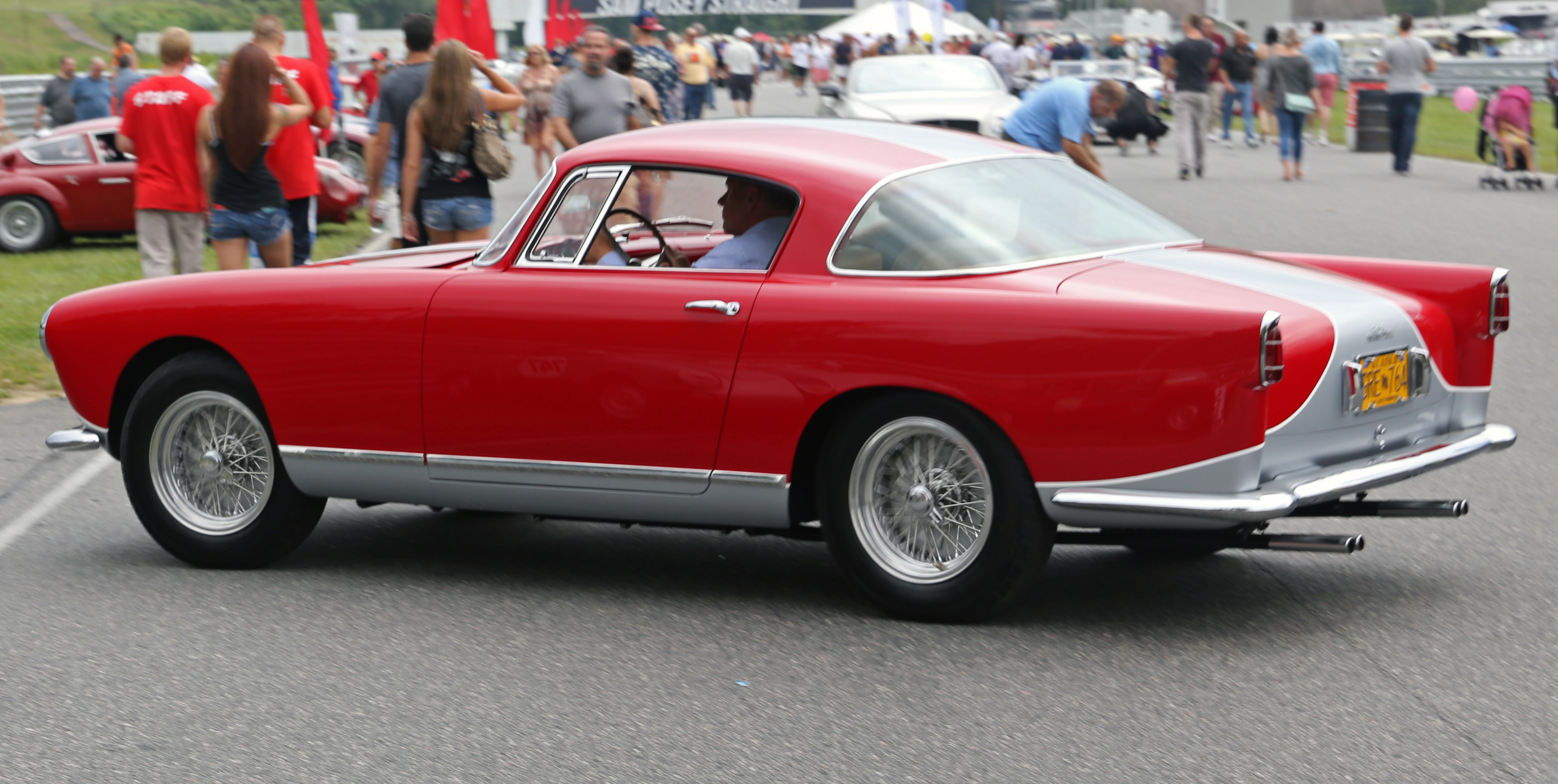
Ferrari 250 GT Boano, low-roof Berlinetta
