= Ghia (surname) =

Ghia is a surname, used in both Italy and India. Notable people with the name include:

- Ami Ghia (born 1952), Indian badminton player
- Dana Ghia (born 1932), Italian actress, singer, and model
- Fernando Ghia (1935–2005), Italian film producer and talent agent
- Giacinto Ghia (1887–1944), Italian automobile coachbuilder
- Kantilal Ghia, Indian politician
- Urmila Ghia, Indian-American mechanical engineer

== See also ==
- Carrozzeria Ghia, automotive company founded by Giacinto Ghia
- Ghia Mtayrek (born 2000), Lebanese footballer
- Ghia Nodia (born 1954), Georgian political analyst
- Ghia River, in Romania
