= Bucket seat =

Contoured car seat, as opposed to flat and bench automotive seating

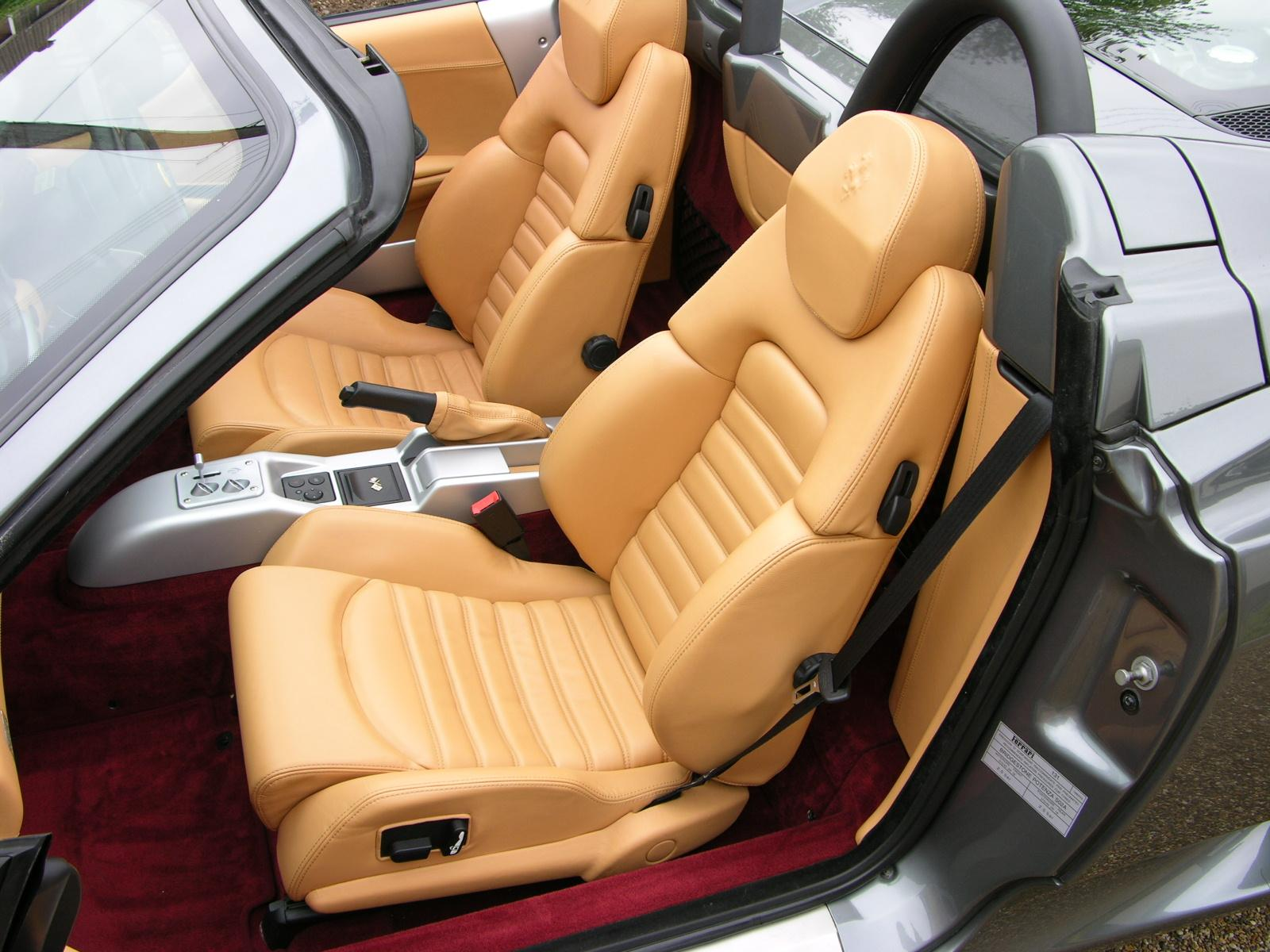
Bucket seats in a high-performance 2-seat 2009 Ferrari 360 Spider

A bucket seat is a car seat contoured to hold one person, distinct from a flat bench seat designed to fit multiple people. In its simplest form, it contours somewhat to the human body, but may have a deep seat and exaggerated sides that partially enclose and support the body in high-performance automobiles.

Before World War II, the term Kübelsitzwagen (meaning bucket-seat car) became popular in Germany, for light open-topped, cross-country and military vehicles without doors, because these were typically equipped with bucket seats, to help keep occupants on board, in an era before the adoption of seat belts. This body style had first been developed by Karosseriefabrik N. Trutz in 1923. They are typically standard in front of fast cars to keep drivers and other passengers in place when turning at speed. Rear "bucket seats" are typically hybrids of bench and true bucket seats, being contoured like the latter but fixed in place, even when divided by a center console, and thus lacking a free-standing bucket seat's front-rear and often backrest angle adjustability.

== In American cars ==
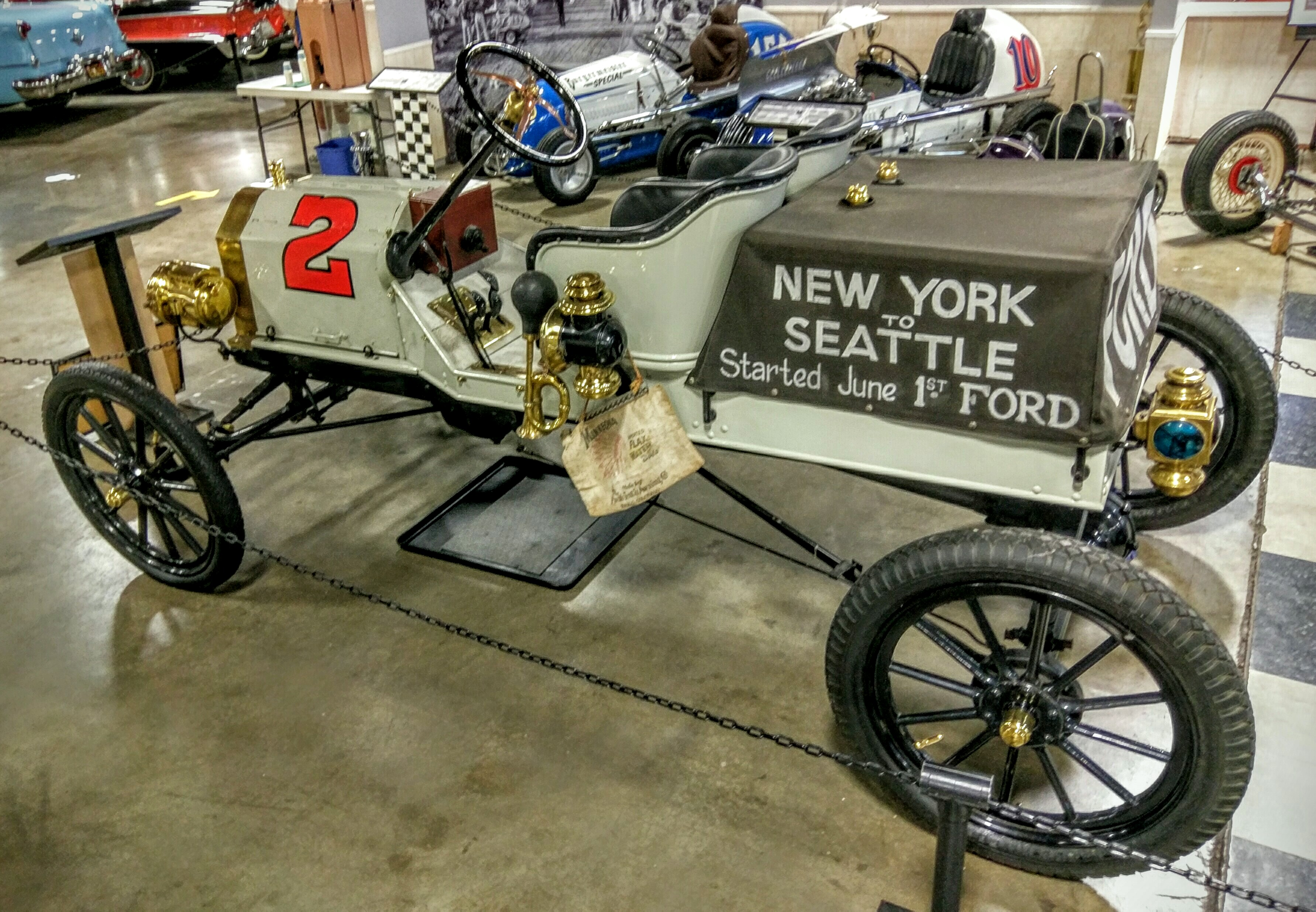
Many early automobiles lacked either cabins or doors. Full-width wrap-around or individual bucket seats kept passengers in cars until designs changed. Pictured, 1909 Ford Model T race-car with minimal bodywork to save weight.

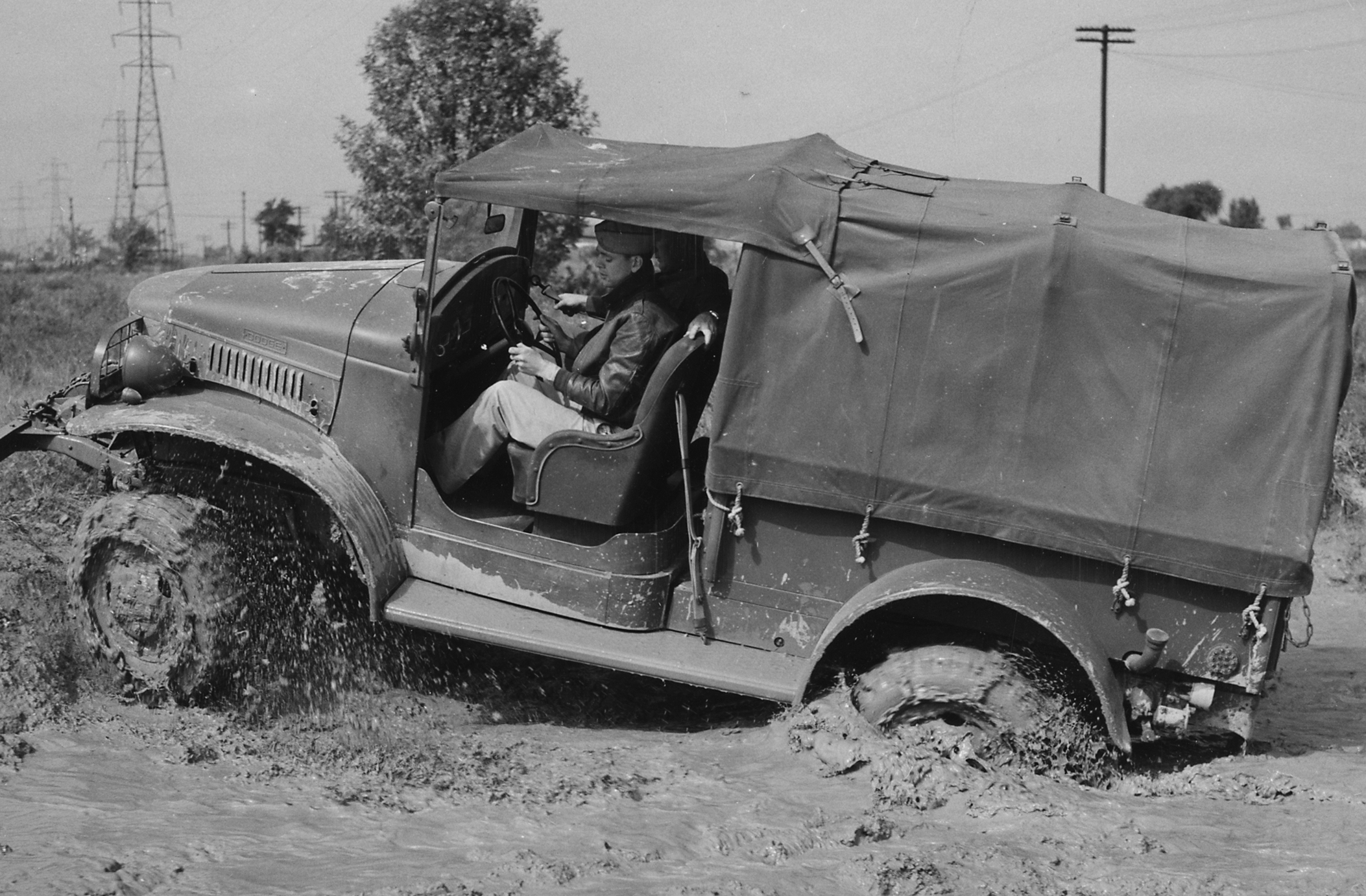
An experimental "bucket seat" in a 1941 1/2‑ton Dodge WC-4

Since their inception, almost all American cars were equipped with bench seats, like those in carriages, which permitted multi-passenger seating. As European cars became more accessible to Americans following World War II, bucket seats became associated with sports performance and luxury. Bucket seats then spread to American manufacturers, beginning as "sporty trim packages" in the late 1950s and later appearing as a standard feature.

The popularity of front bucket seats began with sporty compact cars, pioneered by General Motors in 1960, with production of the Chevrolet Corvair 900 series Monza Club Coupe with standard front bucket seats. By 1962, more than one million U.S. built cars were factory equipped with bucket seats; often, these were fitted with a center console containing a gear shifter and other features such as ashtrays, a cigarette lighter, storage compartments, and power window controls between the seats. Large luxurious front bucket seats (and contoured "bucket-style" rears) made their debut in American personal luxury cars with the debut of the 1963 Buick Riviera in late 1962 as a 1963 model. In 1964, Ford introduced the Mustang "pony car", following the success of the sporty Corvair Monza further popularized the idea of standard front bucket seats – although a front bench seat was an available option. With the introduction of subcompact automobiles in the U.S. in the early 1970s, such as the Chevrolet Vega and Ford Pinto, bucket seats were used for the same reasons they had originally appeared: lack of seating room and floor-mounted levers for the gear shifter and parking brake.

While bucket seats continued to gain popularity among compact and sporty cars, the bench seat remained the preferred front seating arrangement in larger cars and trucks until the late 1990s. Increasingly, mid- and full-size domestic cars, as well as trucks, offered front bucket seating options for customers who wanted a sporty image or more personalized car. In the following decades this trend spread, with the last sedan to come with a standard front bench seat being the 2011 Lincoln Town Car, and the last to offer it as an option the 2013 Chevrolet Impala. SUVs spread widely during this time, universally with bucket seats in front. As of 2015, only some pickup trucks and SUVs retained the front bench seat.

== Rear seating ==
Although rear seating in automobiles largely utilizes bench seats, some 2+2 cars have bucket-style seats in the rear. The first usage of rear bucket seats was in the 1960-1962 Chrysler 300 F, G & H coupes and convertibles inspired by the 1956 Chrysler Norseman concept car. Long-wheelbase variants of full-size luxury cars, such as the Lexus LS 460L have an "executive seating package" option that reduces the rear to two passengers but provides them with more amenities. The Porsche Panamera offers only bucket seats as the rear configuration despite its large size.

== Third-row seating ==
Individual bucket-style seats are also used in passenger vans and minivans, although they are not always referred to as such. Unlike those in cars, bucket seats in vans can be configured in different ways or even removed for more cargo storage. In the typical minivan configuration, the front and middle rows have two bucket seats each, while the third-row seat has a three-person bench, for a total of seven passengers. Honda Odyssey 2005-2010 models (except for the base trim) adds a stowable "PlusOneSeat" between the middle row bucket seats. The Australian Mazda MPV has three seats in the middle and two in the last row.

The Chrysler Pacifica was a luxury crossover SUV where all three rows were bucket seats.

== Sport seats ==
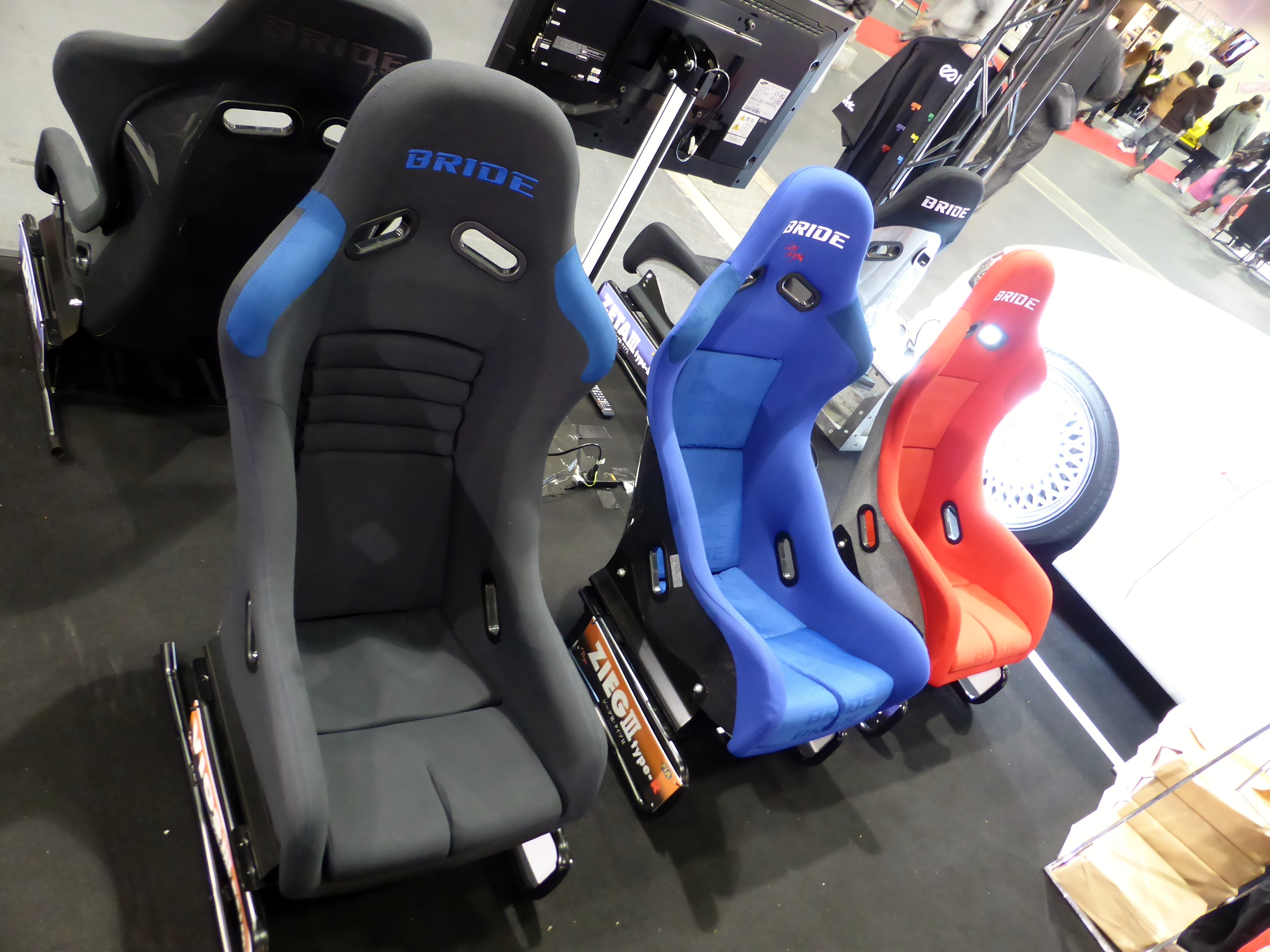
Extreme racing seats sacrifice being adjustable, instead enveloping the rider in a single shell design

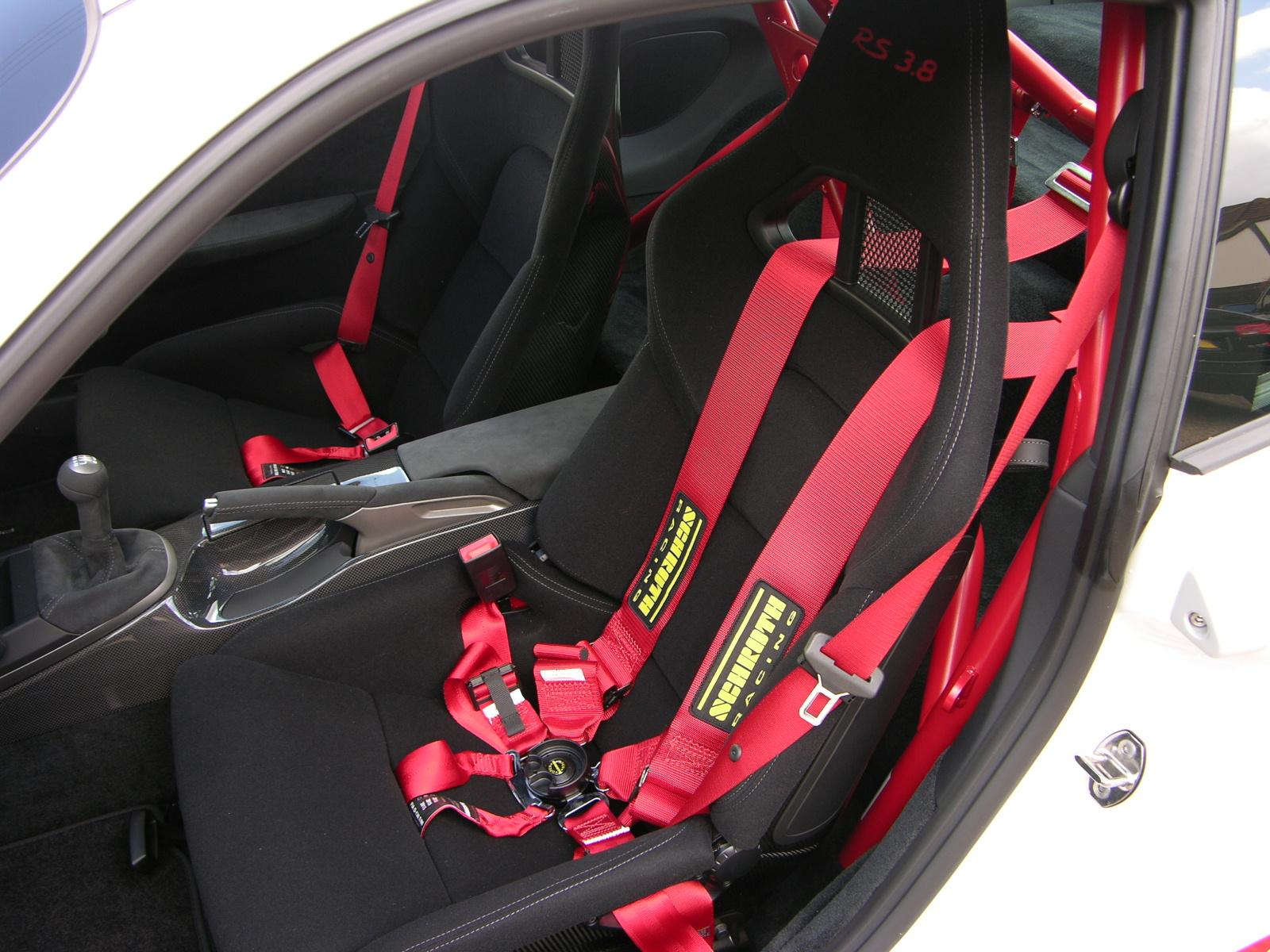
Bucket seat with Schroth six-point harness in a 2010 Porsche 997 GT3 RS 3.8

A sport seat is an improved version of a bucket seat with advanced lateral support and ability to accommodate racing harnesses. Sport seats are designed according to the shape of a human body to provide advanced lateral support and weight distribution, which helps the driver withstand g-force while cornering. Sport seats come with special openings for 3-point, 4-point, or 5-point racing harnesses to increase safety in extreme driving conditions. These seats often are lighter in weight compared to stock bucket seats, which is vital for any sports car. They are universal and technically can be installed in any vehicle using model specific or universal bolt-on seat mounting brackets.

== Suspension seats ==
A suspension seat is a variation of a sport bucket seat designed for off-road vehicles. Unlike seats for sports cars, it is equipped with additional springs or suspension components that give extra shock absorption for bumps and jumps, making it softer and relatively more comfortable for the driver. While suspension seats provide more comfort for passengers, they are not considered safer than the static bucket seats used in motorsports.

== See also ==
- List of auto parts
