= Ghia Microsport =

Concept car

Overview
- Manufacturer: Ford Motor Company
- Production: 1978; 1 functional prototype
- Designer: Ghia

Body and chassis
- Class: Concept car
- Body style: 2-door
- Layout: FWD
- Related: Ford Fiesta

Powertrain
- Engine: 957 cc Valencia I4
- Transmission: 4-speed manual

Dimensions
- Wheelbase: 80 in (2,032 mm)
- Length: 135.7 in (3,447 mm)
- Width: 60.8 in (1,544 mm)
- Height: 48.6 in (1,234 mm)

The Ghia Microsport, sometimes referred to as the Ford Microsport, was a one-off concept car created by Italian design studio Ghia as a part of Ford of Europe's design operation, used as a prototype test bed for reducing aerodynamic drag and cutting weight, and displayed at the 1978 Turin Auto Show. After Ford reduced the size of the Ghia studio in Turin, this car was sold as part of "Unique Design Prototype and Concept Auto Show Models from the Ford Motor Company Collection" auction and was on display at Ford World Headquarters in Dearborn, Michigan as part of the Ford Centennial celebrations.

== Background ==
Ghia was founded in 1916 in Turin, Italy, and sold to Ford Motor Company in 1970. The Ford Fiesta was designed by Ghia for the 1976 launch and a production Fiesta Mk1 was used as the basis for the Microsport.

== Design ==
Microsport rear view

Microsport dashboard

The working prototype was built in sheet aluminum on a Fiesta platform with the wheelbase shortened by 10 in (254 mm) and modified to house a new fuel tank shape with its capacity reduced to 20-25 litres. the design was of a "formal notchback" theme with an integrated rear spoiler for improved aerodynamics. The front features rectangular double sealed-beam headlights, possibly faired with transparent plastics, and federalized bumpers (the integrated front one with spoiler shape).

The design was approved in December 1977, a plaster/epowood model was delivered on Jan 6, 1978, and the prototype was completed on Mar 24, 1978. The bodywork was handcrafted in aluminum by Ghia in Turin, Italy. Interior fittings were lightened and simplified. The custom dashboard was designed and built in aluminum by Ghia.

== See also ==
- Ford Indigo
