= Dual-Ghia =

Defunct American motor vehicle manufacturer

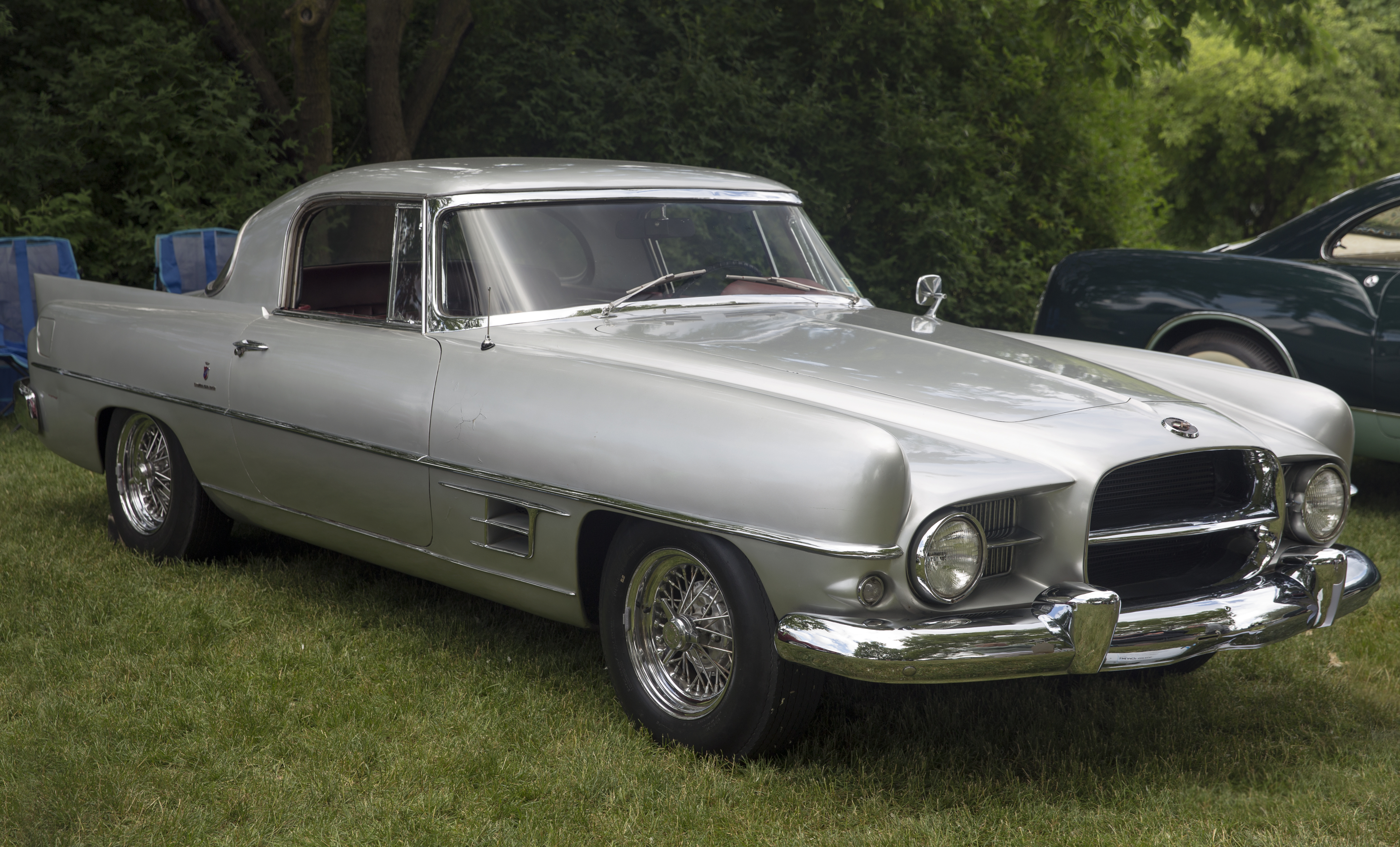
- The 1957 Dual-Ghia Coupé prototype

Overview
- Production: 1956–1958

Body and chassis
- Body style: 2-door convertible; 2-door coupé
- Layout: FR
- Related: Dodge D-500

Powertrain
- Engine: 315 cu in (5.2 L) 4-bbl. Dodge "Poly" V8; 361 cu in (5.9 L) Chrysler "B" V8
- Transmission: two-speed automatic

Dimensions
- Wheelbase: 115 in (2,921 mm)
- Length: 203.5 in (5,169 mm)
- Width: 79 in (2,007 mm)

Dual-Ghia is a rare, short-lived, automobile make produced in the United States between 1956 and 1958. The idea for a sporty limited production car came from Eugene Casaroll, who controlled specialized vehicle builder Dual-Motors Corporation based in Detroit, Michigan; the name Dual-Ghia is representative of the collaborative efforts between the builder and Carrozzeria Ghia. 117 examples were built.

== Design ==
The design for a luxurious sports car was to be a modified version of the Ghia-built 1954 and 1955 Dodge-based concept cars known as the Firearrow I, II, III, IV and the nearly production-ready Firebomb; which had all been designed by Luigi Segre with conceptual guidance from Virgil Exner. With so many cars designed along the same theme, Chrysler may well have intended to produce the Firebomb and/or the Chrysler Falcon as a response to the Ford Thunderbird and Chevrolet Corvette. Due to budgetary constraints and a lack of desire by Chrysler to directly compete, the vehicles were relegated to promotional talking-points and design case studies. After gaining rights to the Firearrow/Firebomb design, Casaroll asked Ghia's U.S. representative (and eventual Dual-Motors VP) Paul Farago to further develop the Firebomb into a production-friendly vehicle. The series-produced design utilized an even greater number of standard production MoPar fittings, the (road-legal) Firebomb two headlamp configuration, incorporated modest tail fins and was somewhat more slab-sided and square-edged in comparison to the Firearrow/Firebomb series. While a four-place convertible was the only official body type, one coupé prototype was also built.

The "world's longest assembly line" involved transporting a Dodge frame and drivetrain to Italy, where the bodywork and interior was fabricated by the coachbuilders at Ghia; once the partially completed vehicles were back in the U.S. Dual-Motors handled the rest. Performance was excellent, due to the cars being powered by the 315 cu in (5.2 L) Dodge hemispherical-head short-stroke V-8 engine. Not all were built with the 315 CID Dodge hemispherical head engine. Some 1957s were built with the Dodge D-500 361 cu in (5.9 L) dual quad carburetor.

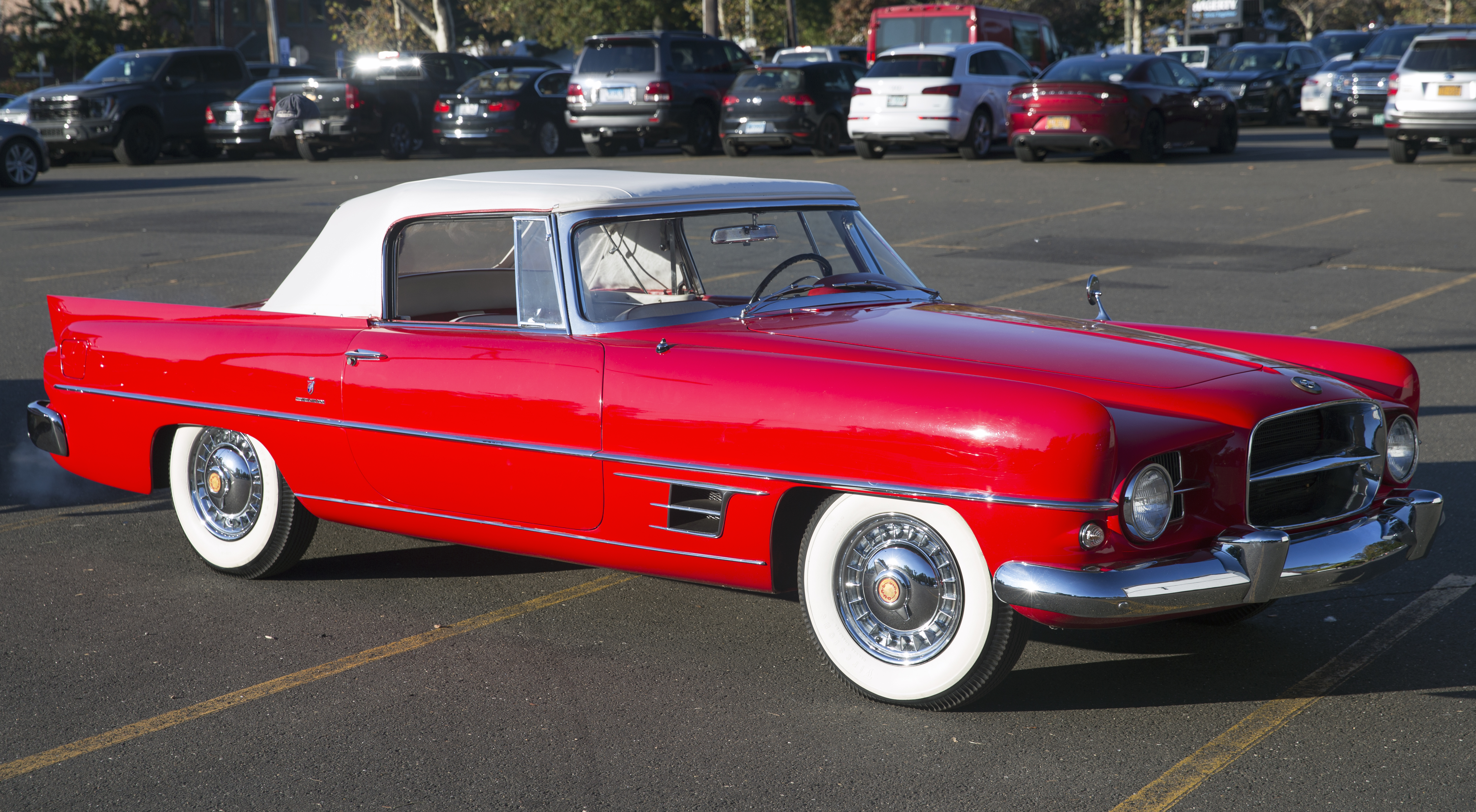
1957 Dual-Ghia D-500

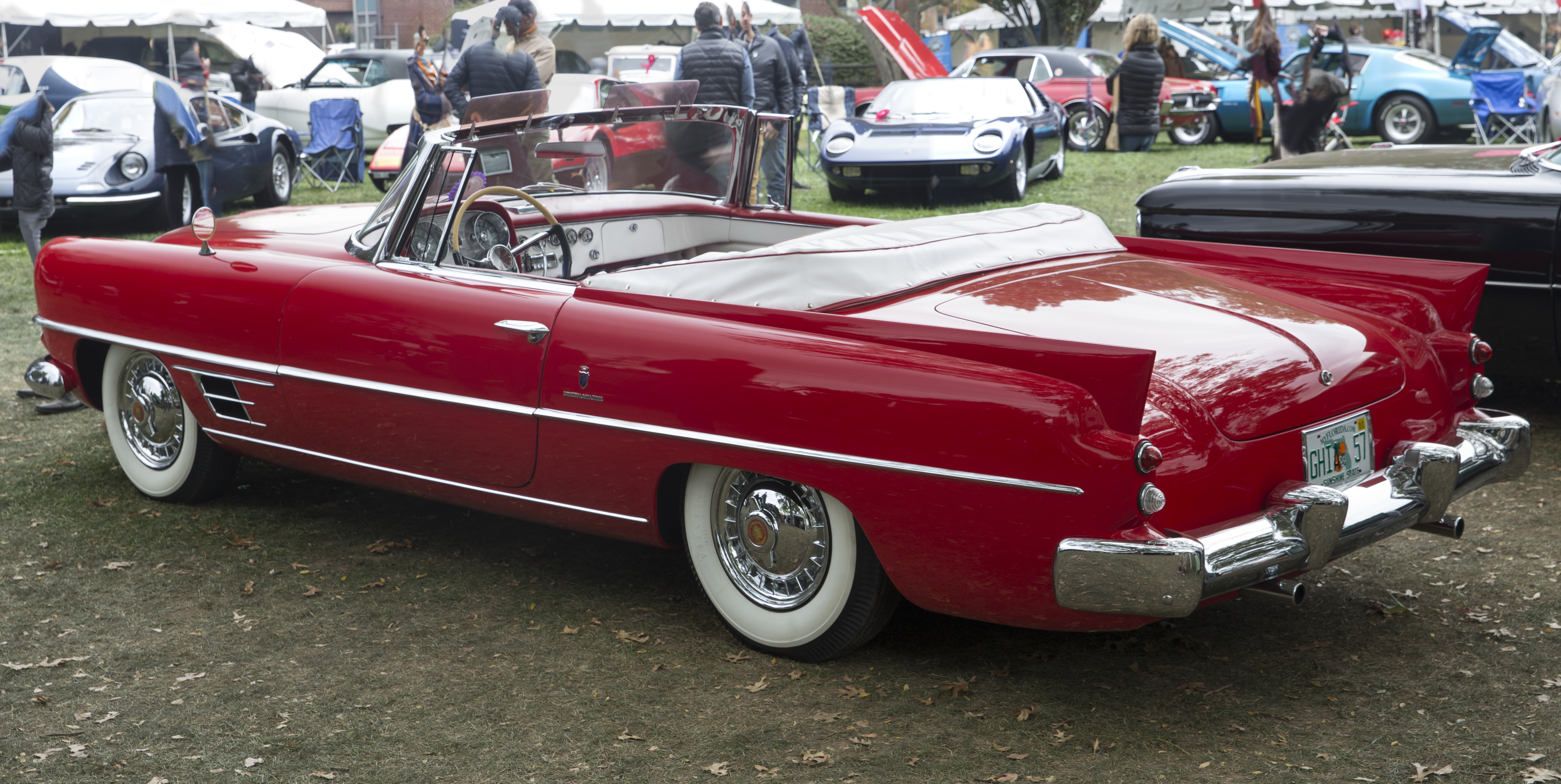
1957 Dual-Ghia D-500

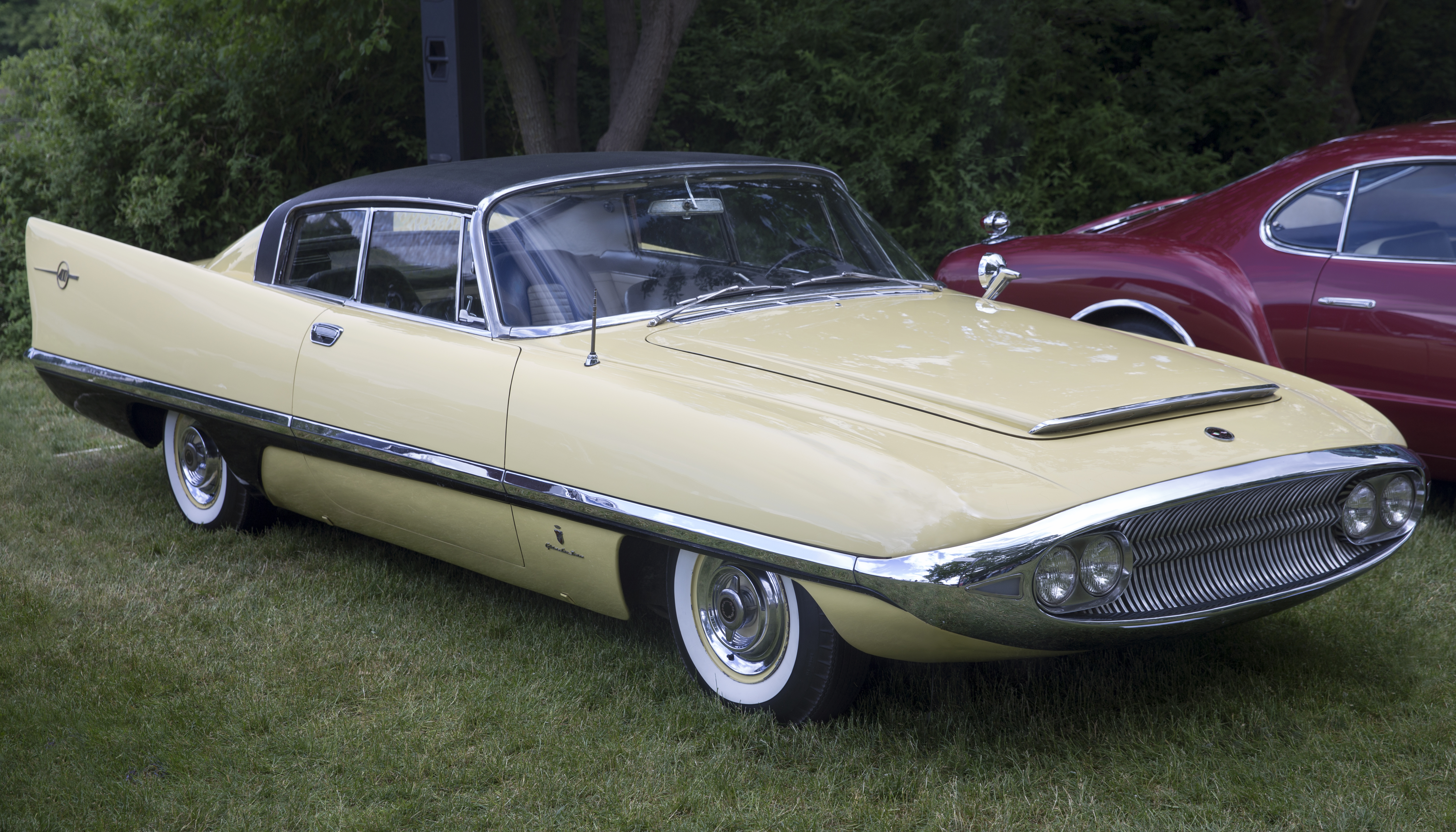
1957 Chrysler Ghia Super Dart 400 Coupe Prototype; sold to Dual and shown as a Dual-Ghia in 1958

== Rarity ==
With a retail price close to $7,500 ($88,816 in 2025 dollars), the Dual-Ghia D-500 was about $200 more expensive than most American production luxury cars. It cost, for example, about $200 more than Cadillac's Eldorado Biarritz convertible. However, its price was much less than ultra-luxurious cars such as the 1956 Continental Mark II at $10,400, or the 1957 Cadillac Eldorado Brougham at $13,074, ($154,824 in 2025 dollars). Of the 117 cars produced, 32 still existed as of July 2006. The cars were mostly bought by American celebrities, such as Frank Sinatra, Sterling Hayden and Richard Nixon. Desi Arnaz owned a Dual-Ghia, but the car was ruined in an accident. Additionally, Dean Martin owned a Dual-Ghia according to his son Ricci. Dean Martin can be seen driving the vehicle in the film Kiss Me, Stupid. A Dual-Ghia owned by musician Rick Danko was auctioned by Sotheby's for approximately $350,000 in 2015.
