= Urmila Ghia =

Indian-American mechanical engineer

Urmila Agarwal Ghia is an Indian-American mechanical engineer whose research involves computational fluid dynamics, and who is particularly known for her work on multigrid methods for incompressible flow. She is a professor emerita of mechanical engineering and materials engineering at the University of Cincinnati.

Her 1982 paper with Kirti Ghia and C. T. Shin used the flow in a lid-driven cavity as its model problem, at Reynolds numbers as high as 10,000. It has been called "the most referred source of results on the driven cavity flow".

== Education and career ==
Ghia is originally from northern India, and was encouraged in schooling by her parents. As a way of rebelling against tradition, she chose engineering over a career in medicine, and became a student at the University of Bombay despite heavy pressure to give up her spot there in favor of a male student. She graduated with a bachelor's degree in mechanical engineering in 1965, although by 1964 she had already traveled to Chicago to begin her graduate studies at the Illinois Institute of Technology (IIT).

She earned a master's degree at IIT in 1967 and completed her PhD there in 1971. Her doctoral dissertation was Incremental L_{2}-norm stability of systems governed by nonlinear partial differential equations. At IIT, she met her husband, Kirti Ghia, an aerospace engineer from Bombay. Together, after finishing their degrees, they took faculty positions at the University of Cincinnati.

At Cincinnati, Ghia became director of the computational fluid dynamics laboratory, and in 1995 founded the university's Women in Science and Engineering program. She was acting vice provost for academic affairs in 1994–1995, and chair of the Department of Mechanical, Industrial, and Nuclear Engineering from 1995 to 2000, and chair of the Fluids Engineering Division of the American Society of Mechanical Engineers in 2007.

== Recognition ==
Ghia is an ASME Fellow, elected in 2013. She is also a Fellow of the American Institute of Aeronautics and Astronautics.

She was a 2006 winner of the MMAE Distinguished Alumni Award of the Illinois Institute of Technology.
