= Giacinto Ghia =

Italian automobile coachbuilder

- Born: 18 September 1887; Turin, Italy
- Died: 21 February 1944 (aged 56); Turin, Italy
- Known for: Automotive design

Giacinto Ghia (18 September 1887 – 21 February 1944) was an Italian automobile coachbuilder and founder of Carrozzeria Ghia.

== Biography ==
Ghia was a test driver at Rapid and Diatto, prior to being seriously injured in 1915 — the same year he established Carrozzeria Ghia & Gariglio with his partner Gariglio. After his factory was eradicated during an Allied bombing raid in 1943, he died of heart failure while overseeing the rebuilding of his company.
