= Chrysler Norseman =

1956 concept car

Overview
- Manufacturer: Chrysler
- Production: 1956 (none, sunk on the SS Andrea Doria)
- Designer: Virgil Exner

Body and chassis
- Class: Full-size
- Body style: 2-door fastback
- Layout: FR layout

Powertrain
- Engine: 331 cu in (5.4 L) FirePower V8
- Transmission: Powerflite automatic

Dimensions
- Wheelbase: 129 in (3,277 mm)
- Length: 227.5 in (5,778 mm)
- Width: 80 in (2,032 mm)
- Height: 57 in (1,448 mm)

The Chrysler Norseman was a four-seat fastback coupe built in 1956 as a concept car. Although designed by Chrysler's stylists, actual construction was contracted out to the Italian coach-building firm of Carrozzeria Ghia. The concept car was lost during the sinking of the SS Andrea Doria.

== Design ==
Virgil Exner, working in Chrysler's Advanced Styling Group, developed lower, sleeker, and more aggressive-looking automobiles for Chrysler in the 1950s. Exner also wanted maximum all-around visibility from the car's interior, and he took the design of the Norseman to the limit. The dream car was named for Exner's ancestry.

The Norseman was designed by the Chrysler Corporation Engineering Division and built by Ghia of Turin, Italy. Ghia had experience in the construction of low-volume vehicles and one-off prototypes. Chrysler wanted a fully drivable vehicle, not just a rolling mockup, so all normal systems for the powertrain, braking, suspension, were installed. Power was from a modified 331 cu in (5.4 L) Chrysler Hemi engine producing 235 hp (175 kW; 238 PS) with a pushbutton-controlled Powerflite automatic transmission. The body panels on the car were made of aluminum with "a sharply sloping hood, upswept tail fins and a covered, smooth underbody for aerodynamic efficiency." The Norseman combined a "sweeping fastback rear end design and Chrysler's own take on a tailfin and bumper treatment."

More difficult to fabricate was its unusual cantilevered roof, which was secured to the body only at the rear C pillars. There were no side pillars, and at the front the roof rested only lightly on a fully frameless windshield. An advanced 12 square foot power sliding glass panel sunroof feature was difficult to integrate into a slender roof structure lacking A-pillar support at the front. The windshield and roof glass was specially made by PPG Industries to provide strength and be shatterproof. The door glass was ventless (having no small vent window at the front), a styling theme that would become popular some fifteen years later. The interior featured four bucket seats and the retractable reel-type seatbelts were mounted in the door and fastened across the occupants to the full-length center console which was later adopted in the early 1990s to satisfy passive restraint regulations enacted by the US Department of Transportation. Other features included concealed automatic headlights, door handles, and concealed trunk lid opening device.

Building the complicated car, with its advanced features, took fifteen months and the car was finally delivered to the freight forwarder. it was estimated to cost US$150,000 (in 1956 dollars). The car missed its intended cargo shipment from Italy and was instead put into a container on the next available ship, the passenger ocean liner SS Andrea Doria.

== Legacy ==
The car was to be a featured attraction of Chrysler's auto show exhibit for 1957 and was shipped from Turin by Ghia to New York City in July 1956. The car was shipped on the ocean liner SS Andrea Doria, which was involved in a collision off the coast of Massachusetts and sank, with the loss of fifty-one lives and all cargo.

The Norseman was a "fascinating casualty" of the sinking of the Andrea Doria. As a result, the car was never shown to the public and was never seen by most of the stylists who worked on it. It is known to automotive historians, however, through photographs and specifications. Chrysler never used the cantilevered roof design in any subsequent vehicle.

Automotive designer Dick Teague, who worked for Chrysler as a stylist during the mid-1950s, was responsible for many of American Motors' vehicles and the "Norseman's resemblance to the 1965 Rambler Marlin fastback coupe, or vice versa, was uncanny."

The remains of the Norseman were found in Andrea Doria's number two cargo hold in 1994 by diver David Bright. After almost 40 years below the ocean surface, it had disintegrated into a pile of debris, with only the wheels still being recognizable.
