= Carrozzeria Ghia =

Italian automobile design firm

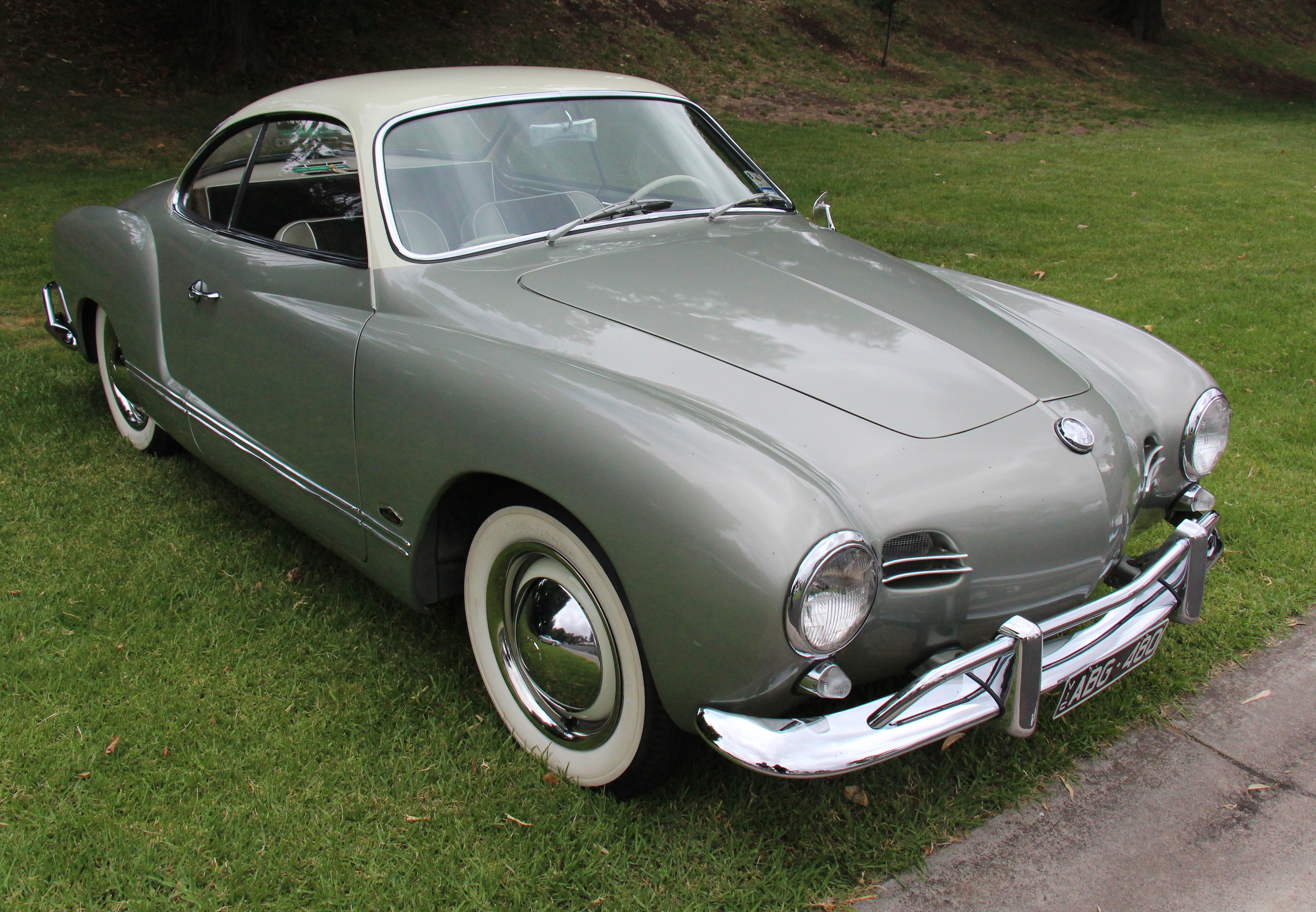
- Volkswagen Karmann Ghia, 1958
- Type: Subsidiary
- Industry: Automotive
- Founded: 1916; 110 years ago
- Founder: Giacinto Ghia
- Defunct: 2001; 25 years ago
- Fate: Design studio closed. Brand retained by Ford of Europe
- Headquarters: Turin, Italy
- Key people: Felice Mario Boano
- Services: automotive design, coachbuilding
- Owner: Ford Motor Company
- Parent: De Tomaso (1967–1970); Ford of Europe (1970–2001)
- Subsidiaries: Ghia-Aigle

Carrozzeria Ghia SpA (established 1916 in Turin) is an Italian automobile design and coachbuilding firm, established by Giacinto Ghia and Gariglio as "Carrozzeria Ghia & Gariglio". The headquarters are located at Corso Guglielmo Marconi, 4, Turin. The company is currently owned by Ford Motor Company and focused on the European market through Ford's subsidiary in the region.

Through the years, Ghia has produced many bodies for several automobile manufacturers such as Alfa Romeo, Chrysler, Ferrari, Fiat, Ford, Jaguar, and Volkswagen.

== History ==
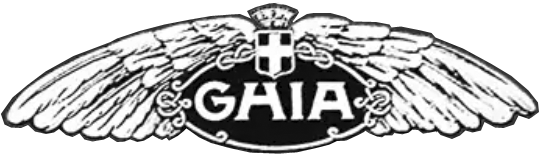
Early Ghia logo of 1916

Ghia initially made lightweight aluminium-bodied cars, achieving fame with the Alfa Romeo 6C 1500, winning Mille Miglia (1929). Between the world wars, Ghia designed special bodies for Alfa Romeo, Fiat, and Lancia, one of the most famous was the Fiat 508 Balilla sports coupe (1933). The factory was rebuilt at Via Tomassi Grossi, after being demolished in an air raid during World War II (1943). After Ghia's death (1944), the company was sold to Mario Boano and Giorgio Alberti. The Ghia-Aigle subsidiary was established in Aigle, Switzerland (1948).

Following differences between Boano and the company's Naples-born chief engineer and designer Luigi Segre, Boano left the company in 1953 and ownership passed to Segre in 1954. Under the ownership of Luigi Segre, between 1953 and 1957, Giovanni Savonuzzi became Direttore Tecnico Progettazione e Produzione Carrozzerie e Stile and established Ghia as the most influential proponent of that Italian styling that came to define automobile design trends worldwide. The decade between 1953 and 1963 saw many foreign firms ordering Ghia designs, such as Volkswagen (the Karmann Ghia) and Volvo. Chrysler and its designer Virgil Exner became a close partner for 15 years, resulting in eighteen Chrysler Ghia Specials (1951–53), the K-310, the Chrysler Norseman, the Imperial Crown limousines (whose notable owners included Jackie Kennedy and Nelson Rockefeller), and others. There are even a few Ghia-bodied Ferraris. Ghia also participated in the short-lived Dual-Ghia venture. Production by Ghia was always in very low numbers, giving the company's products even greater exclusivity than those of the other Italian coachbuilders.

In June 1953, Pierre Lefaucheux, Renault's chairman, requested Carrozzeria Ghia assistance with the Renault Dauphine.

In 1953, Boano left for Fiat, the factory moved to via Agostino da Montefeltro, and Luigi Segre took over. Ghia then brought in Pietro Frua, appointing Frua as head of Ghia Design (1957–60), designing the Renault Floride. After Segre's death in 1963, Ghia was sold to Ramfis Trujillo in 1965, who in turn sold the company in 1967 to Alejandro de Tomaso, owner of a rival design house. De Tomaso never managed to run Ghia profitably and in 1970 he sold his shares to the Ford Motor Company. During this transition period, Ghia had partial involvement in the De Tomaso Pantera, a high-performance, mid-engined car using a Ford V8.

From then on, the Ghia studios were an integral part of Ford of Europe's styling operation – producing mostly concept cars although some production models were styled by the firm – the most notable being the Ford Fiesta Mk1 in 1976, which was penned by Ghia's Tom Tjaarda. Aside from this, the most publicly visible sign of Ford's ownership of Ghia has been its use of the name to denote the luxury trim level of its European models for many years (below).

== Ghia L6.4 ==
After the Dual-Ghia project had ended, the more up-to-date Ghia L6.4 appeared in 1961. Fewer Mopar parts were used, but the car's bespoke nature meant an astronomically high price and when production ended in 1963 only 25 (or 26) cars had been built. The car's 6,277 cc (383 cu in) Chrysler V8 has 340 hp (254 kW) SAE, and suspension and transmission parts were also hand-picked from Chrysler's production line. Both the front and the rear seats consist of separate buckets.

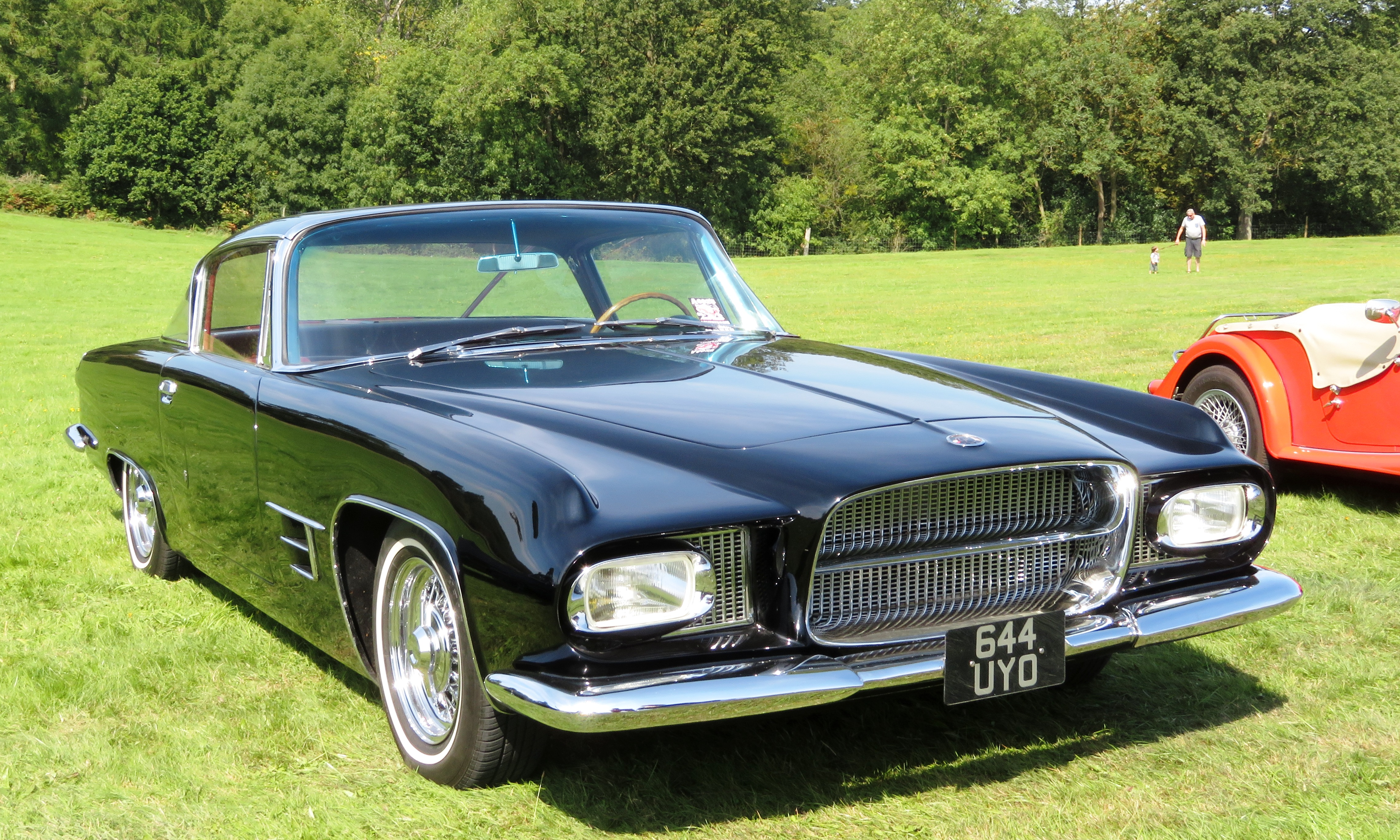
1962 Ghia L6.4

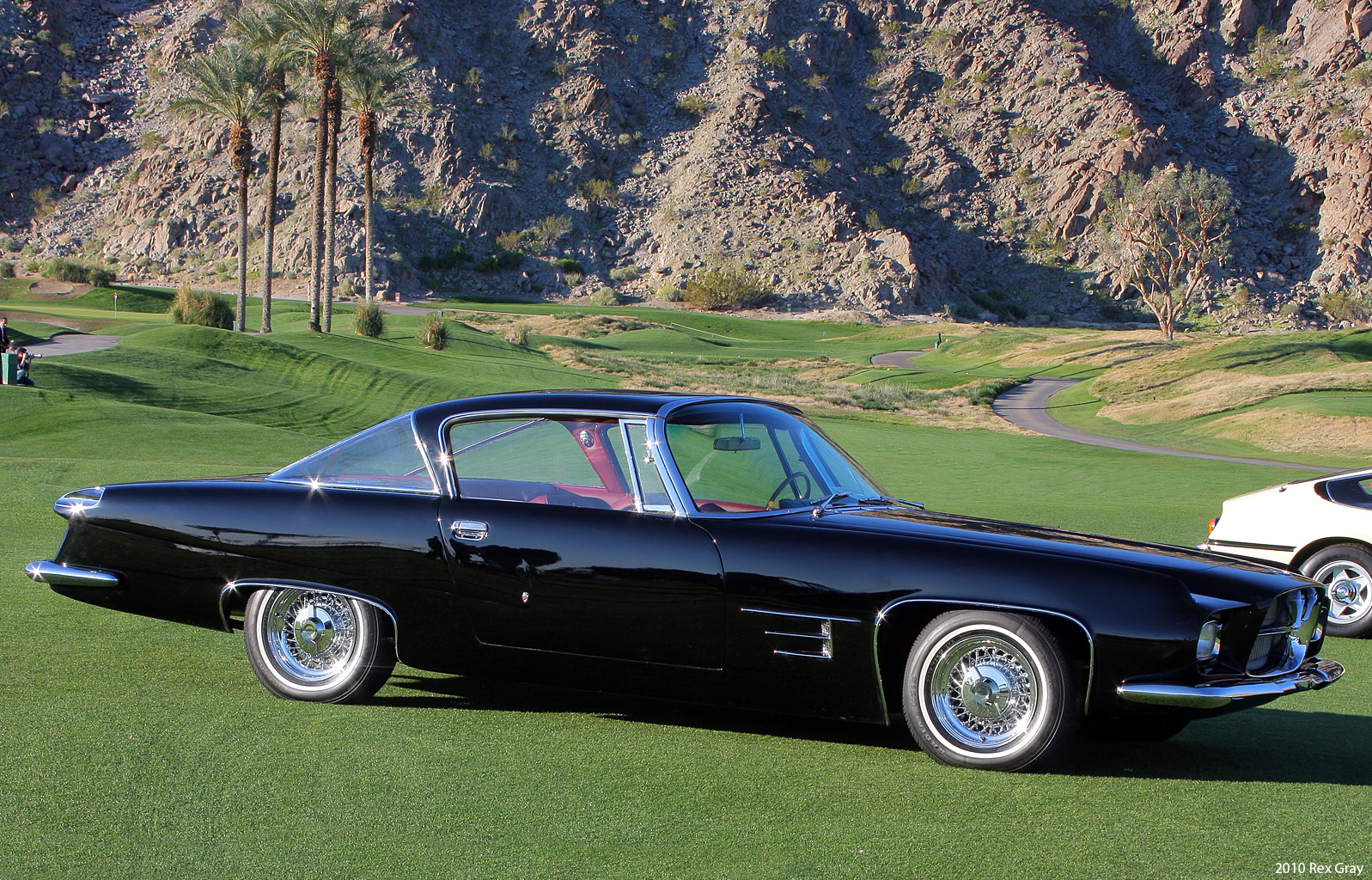
1962 Ghia L6.4

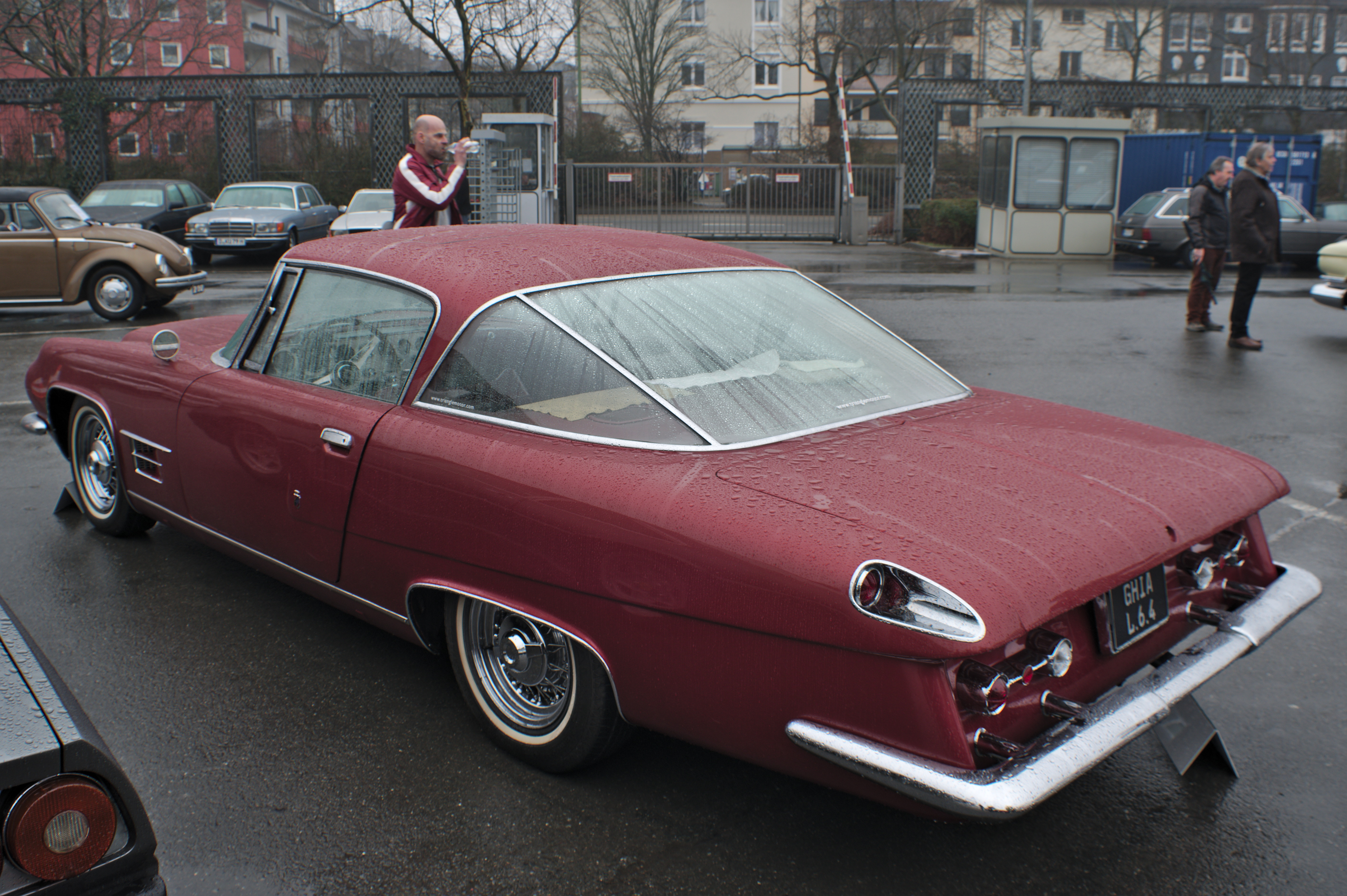
Rear view

== Ghia 450 SS ==
At the 1963 Turin Show, Ghia showed the Fiat 2300-based Ghia G230 S. Unlike the Fiat 2300 Coupé, also designed and bodied by Ghia, the two-seater G230S was built on a tubular spaceframe which was designed and built by specialists Gilco. Four examples were built, two coupés and two convertibles. Ghia's owner Luigi Segre had pushed for the creation of this car, but after his sudden and untimely death the G230 S never entered production. However, in 1965 film and television producer Burt Sugarman saw a picture of the G230 S on the cover of Road & Track magazine and convinced Ghia to build another car using a similar design.

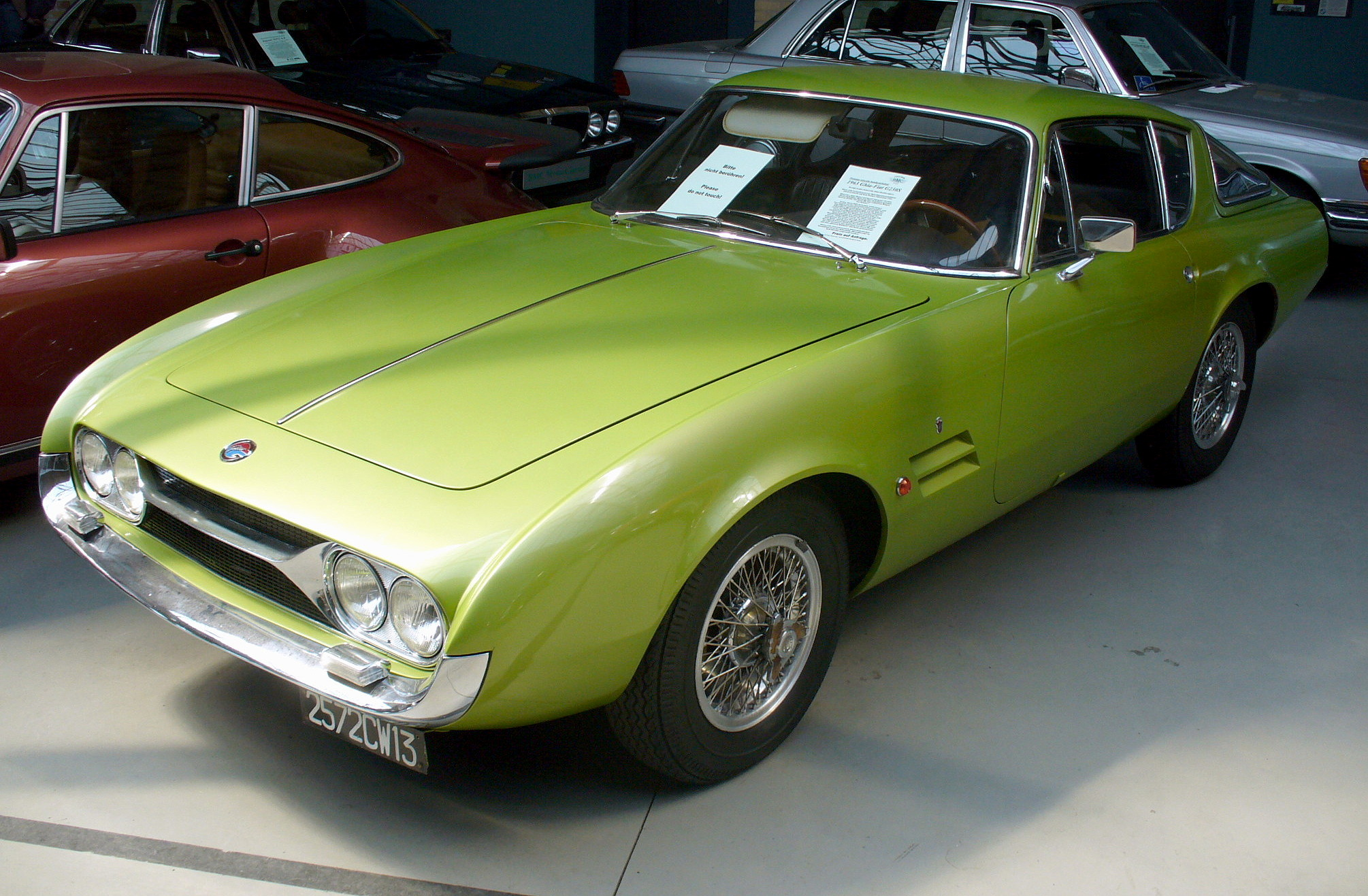
Ghia G 230 S based on Fiat 2300

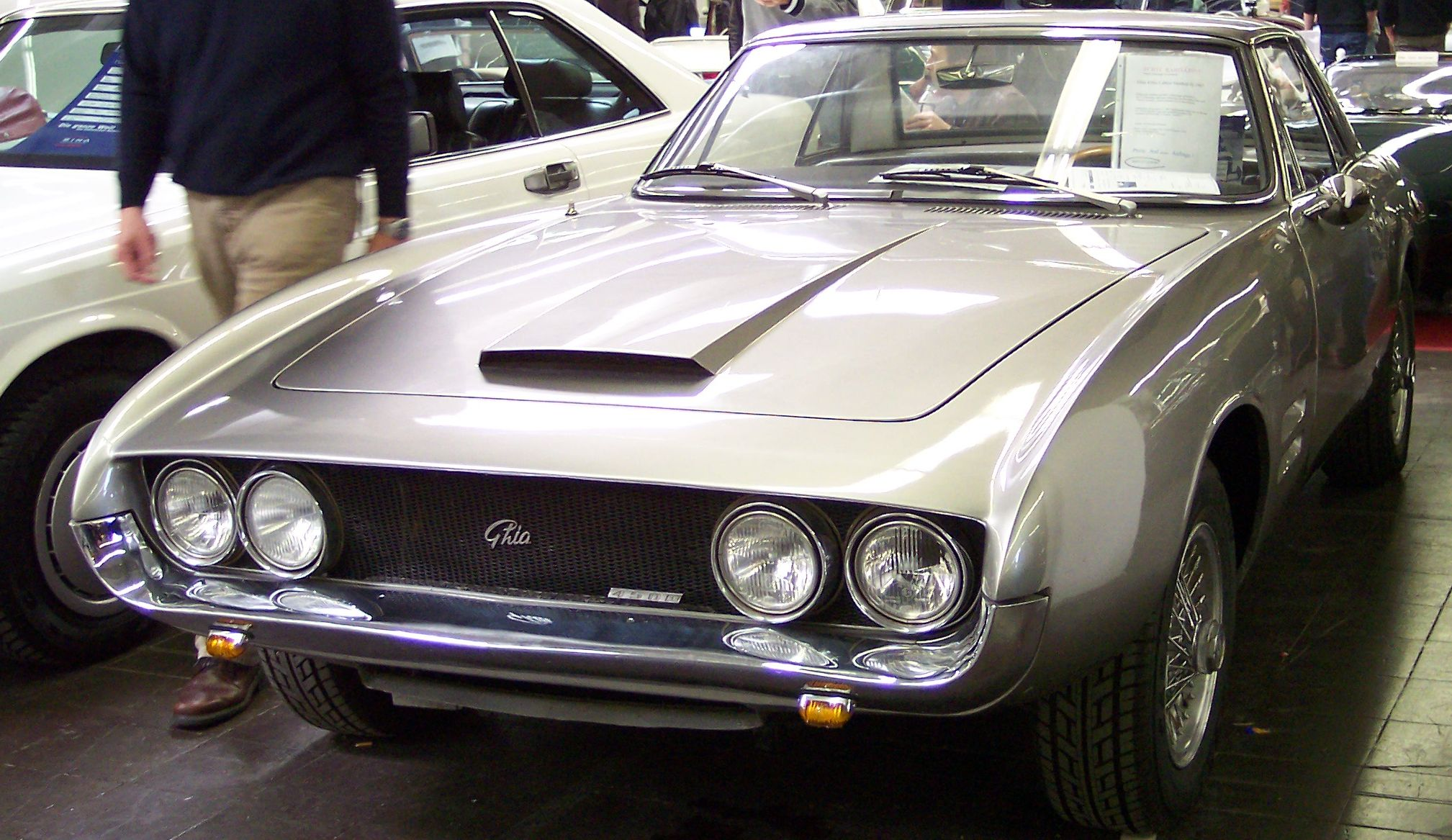
Ghia 450 SS hardtop

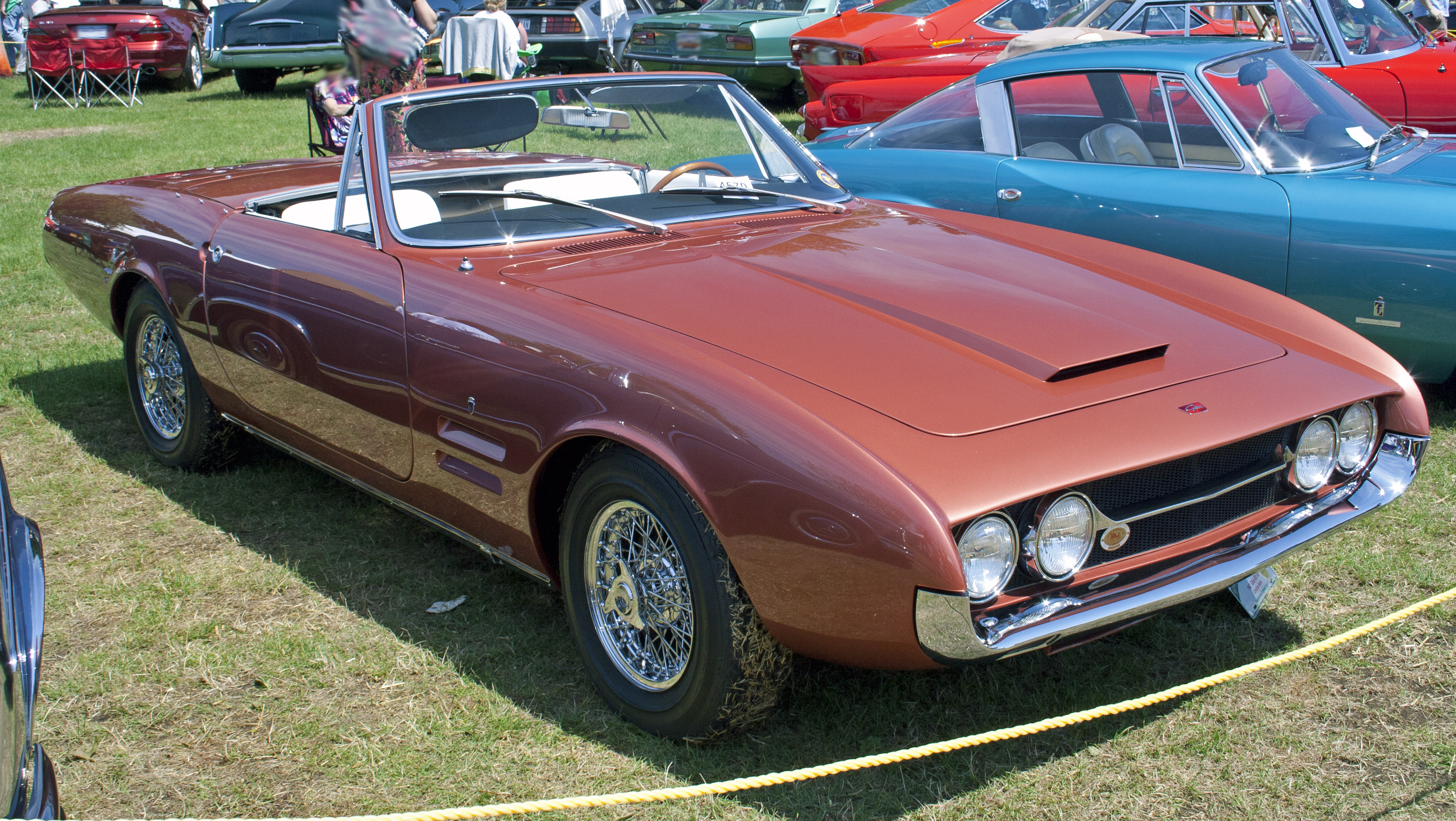
Ghia 450 SS convertible

The result was the Ghia 450 SS, continuing Ghia's collaboration with Chrysler by using that company's recently introduced 273-cubic-inch (4.5 L) "LA" V8 engine with 235 hp (175 kW). So many of the car's parts and systems came from the Plymouth Barracuda that the earliest cars came with a Barracuda manual with some pages crossed out. The 450 SS used the same design language as the smaller G230 S, but its hand beaten steel panels sat on a more traditional and sturdier ladder frame. Unlike the smaller car, the 450 SS was a 2+2 design, offering vestigial rear seat accommodation. It was only built as a two-door roadster, with a standard hardtop included. Over the years, many have credited Giorgetto Giugiaro with this design, but he only left Bertone for Ghia in late 1965 – too late to have much impact on the 450 SS, which was actually designed by Sergio Sartorelli. Giugiaro did revise the grille, front bumper, and rear before the car was presented. Presented at Turin in 1966, 57 examples were built until late 1967 (with late examples registered as model year 1968), although various sources state numbers as low as 52.

== The Ghia name ==
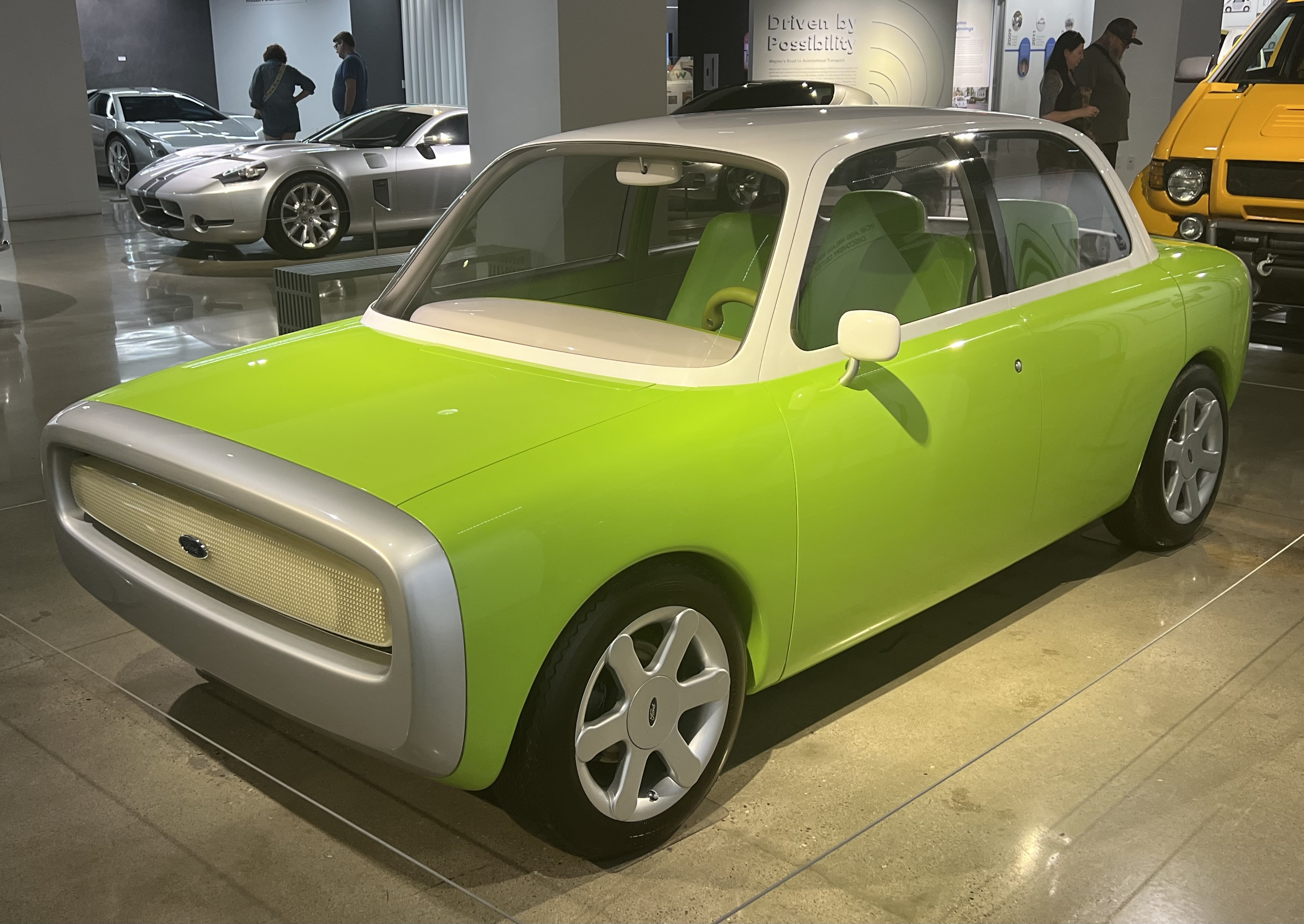
1999 Ford 021C concept car at the Petersen Automotive Museum

From 1973, the Ghia name became Ford's top trim-level in its mainstream model range. The trend began in Europe and North America (Mustang II, Granada, Capri, Cortina, Escort, and later Fiesta, Sierra, Sierra Sapphire, Orion, Scorpio, Mondeo, Focus all had Ghia trim levels), but soon spread worldwide, particularly to the South American (with the Argentinian Ford Falcon and Taunus, the Brazilian Ford Del Rey and versions of Escort, Focus and Mondeo) and Asia Pacific markets (with the Ford Laser, Fairmont, Fairlane and Telstar). One notable exception to this convention was the Scorpio model in the United Kingdom, which was essentially a rebadged Granada Mk3, slotting in above the Ghia in the model lineup. This lasted until the major facelift of 1994, when the Granada name was dropped and replaced by Scorpio for all variants, at which point the Ghia model resumed its position at the top of the range.

In the British market, however, the practice of using the Ghia name in such a capacity was finally phased out in 2010. The Titanium name has instead replaced Ghia as the flagship trim level, and is now used globally across all of Ford's markets to denote the top trim level. The British Ford Fiesta retained the Ghia trim designation for the longest period of any model: 31 years 8 months, uninterrupted, from February 1977 to November 2008. In the rest of Europe, the Ghia trim was discontinued as well. Starting in 2013, the Vignale branding started being used by Ford to designate the top trim levels. The Ghia studios has produced various concept cars under the Ford banner including the 1999 021C.

== Ghia cars ==
- 1929 Alfa Romeo 6C 1500
- 1933 Fiat 508 Balilla sports coupé
- 1947 Alfa Romeo 6C 2500
- 1950 Alfa Romeo 6C 2500 SS Supergioiello
- 1950 Ferrari 195 Inter coupé
- 1951 Ferrari 212 Inter coupé
- 1951 Renault Frégate
- 1952 Chrysler Special Coupé
- 1953 Abarth 1100 Sport Ghia Coupé
- 1953 Fiat 8V Supersonic
- 1953 Cadillac Series 62 Coupe by Ghia
- 1953 Alfa Romeo 1900 Supersonic 'Conrero'
- 1954 Alfa Romeo 1900 Coupe
- 1954 Dodge Firearrow III Sports Coupé
- 1954 Fiat 8V Coupé
- 1954 Jaguar XK120 Supersonic
- 1955 Jaguar XK140 Coupé
- 1955 Lincoln Futura
- 1955 Lincoln Gilda Streamline X
- 1955 Ferrari 410 Gilda Superamerica
- 1955 Volkswagen Karmann Ghia
- 1956 Aston Martin DB2/4 Supersonic
- 1956 Chrysler Norseman
- 1956 Chrysler Plainsman Two-door Station Wagon
- 1956 Renault Dauphine
- 1957 Dual Ghia Convertible
- 1958 Alfa Romeo Giulietta Sprint Veloce prototype
- 1958 Renault Caravelle
- 1961 Fiat 2300 S Coupé
- 1961 Ghia L6.4
- 1962 Type 34 Volkswagen Karmann Ghia
- 1963 Ghia 1500 GT
- 1963 Ghia G230 S (based on Fiat 2300)
- 1963 Chrysler Turbine Car
- 1966 Ghia 450 SS
- 1978 Ghia Microsport
- 1981 Intermericcanica Ghia Cabrio Mustang

== Notable designers ==
- Giacinto Ghia
- Mario Boano
- Luigi Segre
- Giovanni Michelotti
- Pietro Frua
- Giovanni Savonuzzi
- Giorgetto Giugiaro (1965–1967)
- Sergio Sartorelli
- Tom Tjaarda 1958–
- Ercole Spada 1970–
- Filippo Sapino

== Gallery ==
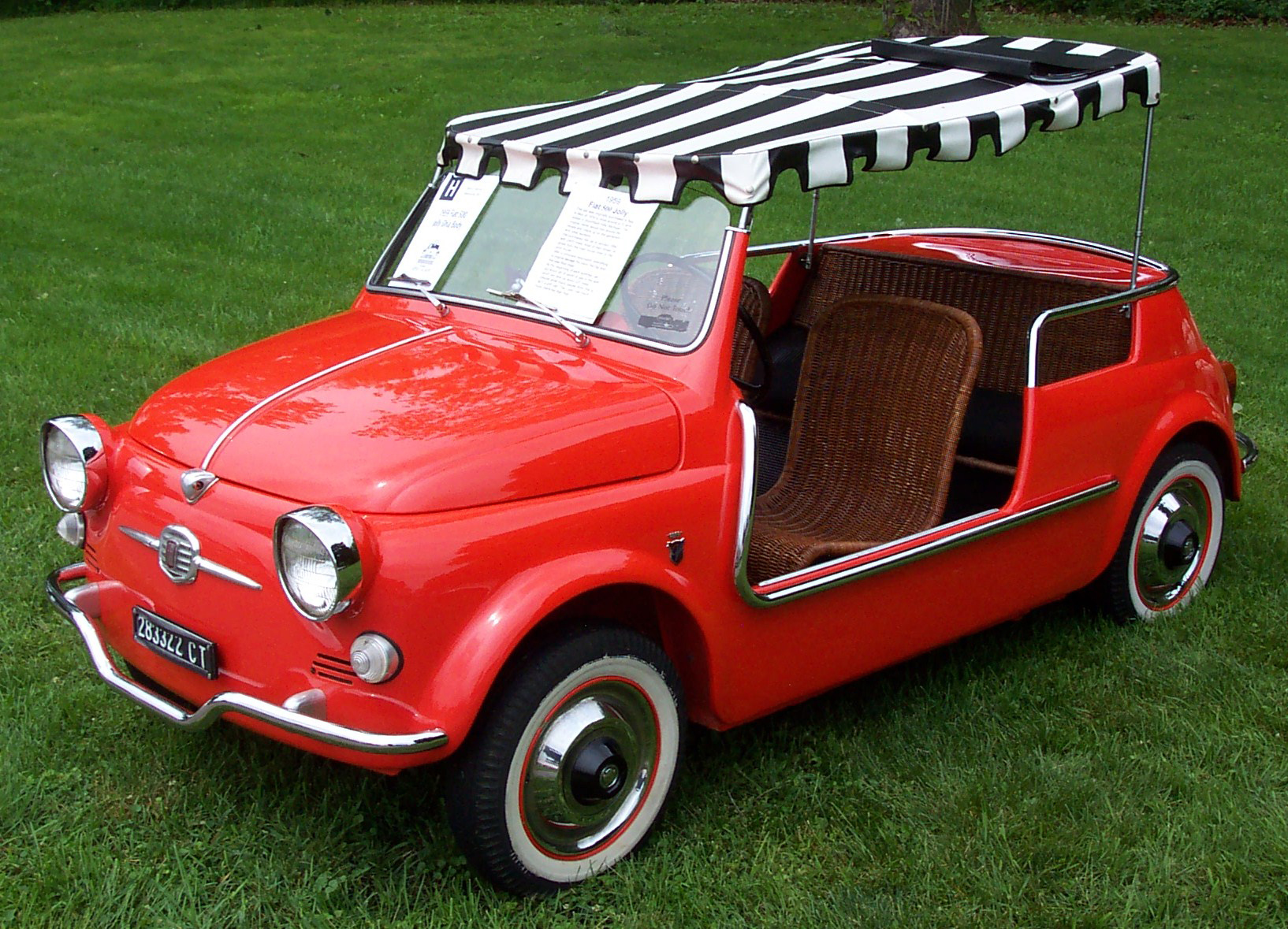
A rare Ghia-designed Fiat 500 Jolly

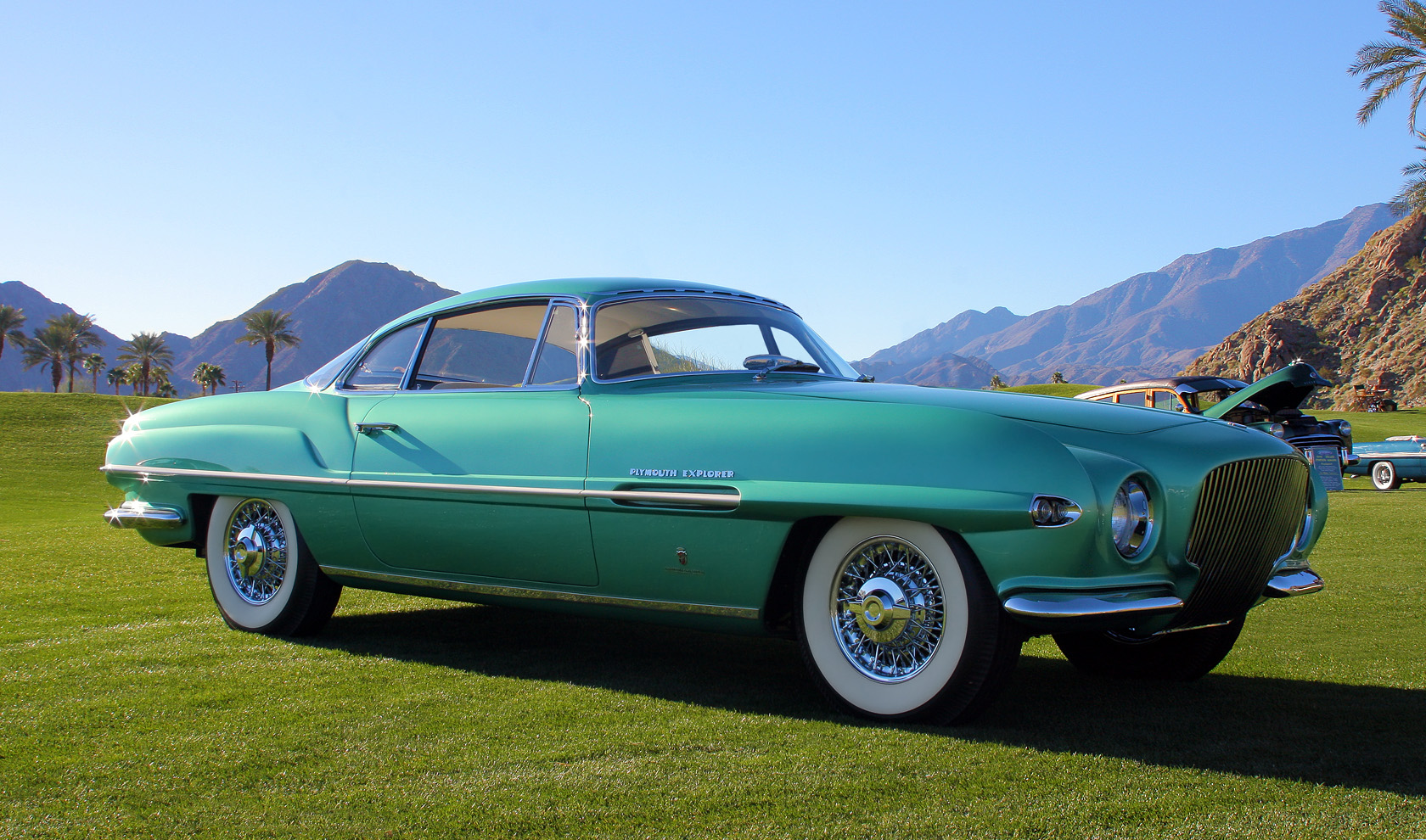
1954 Plymouth Explorer concept car by Ghia

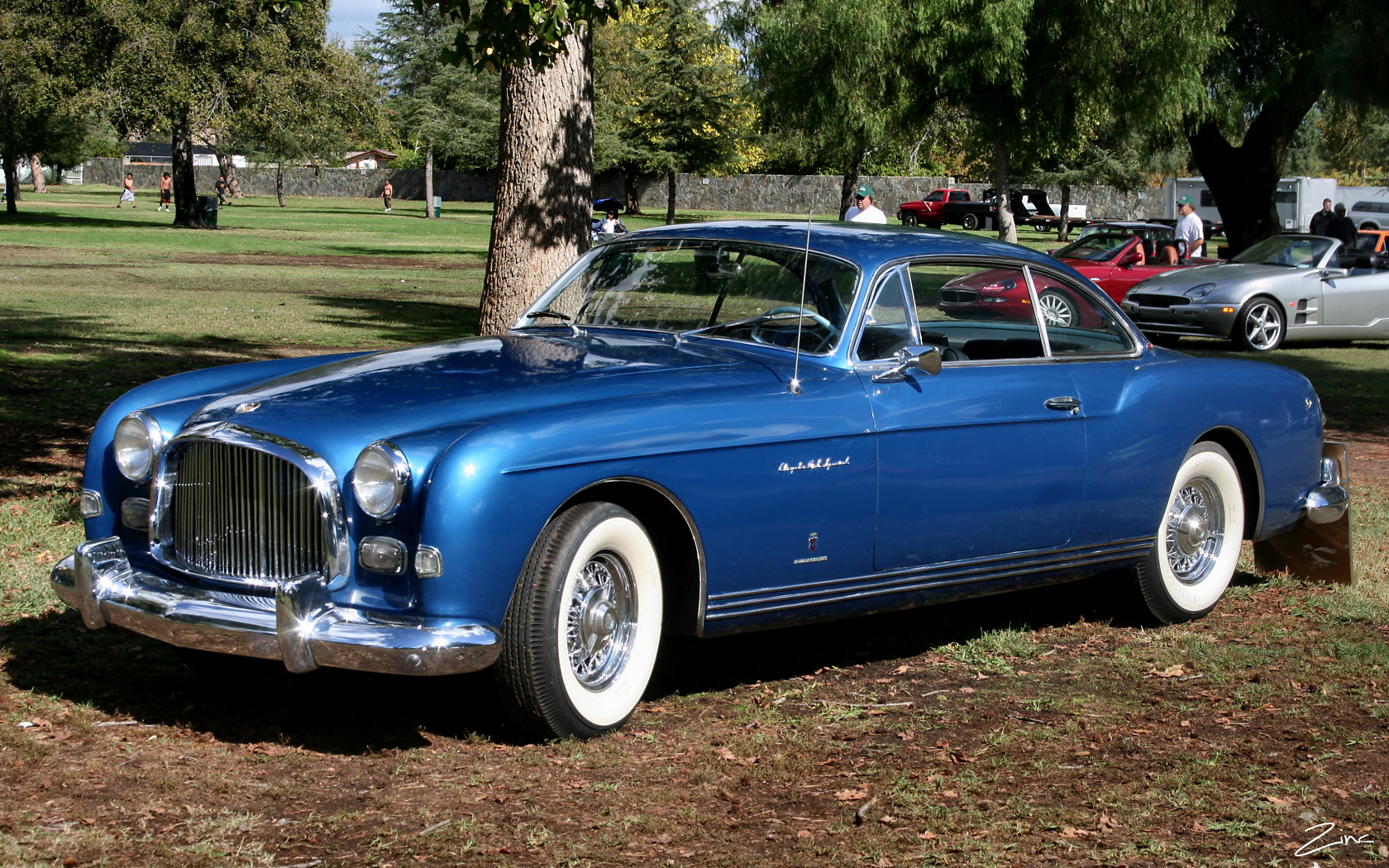
1954 Chrysler Ghia Special GS-1 coupe
