= Porsche Mission X =

Electric sports car

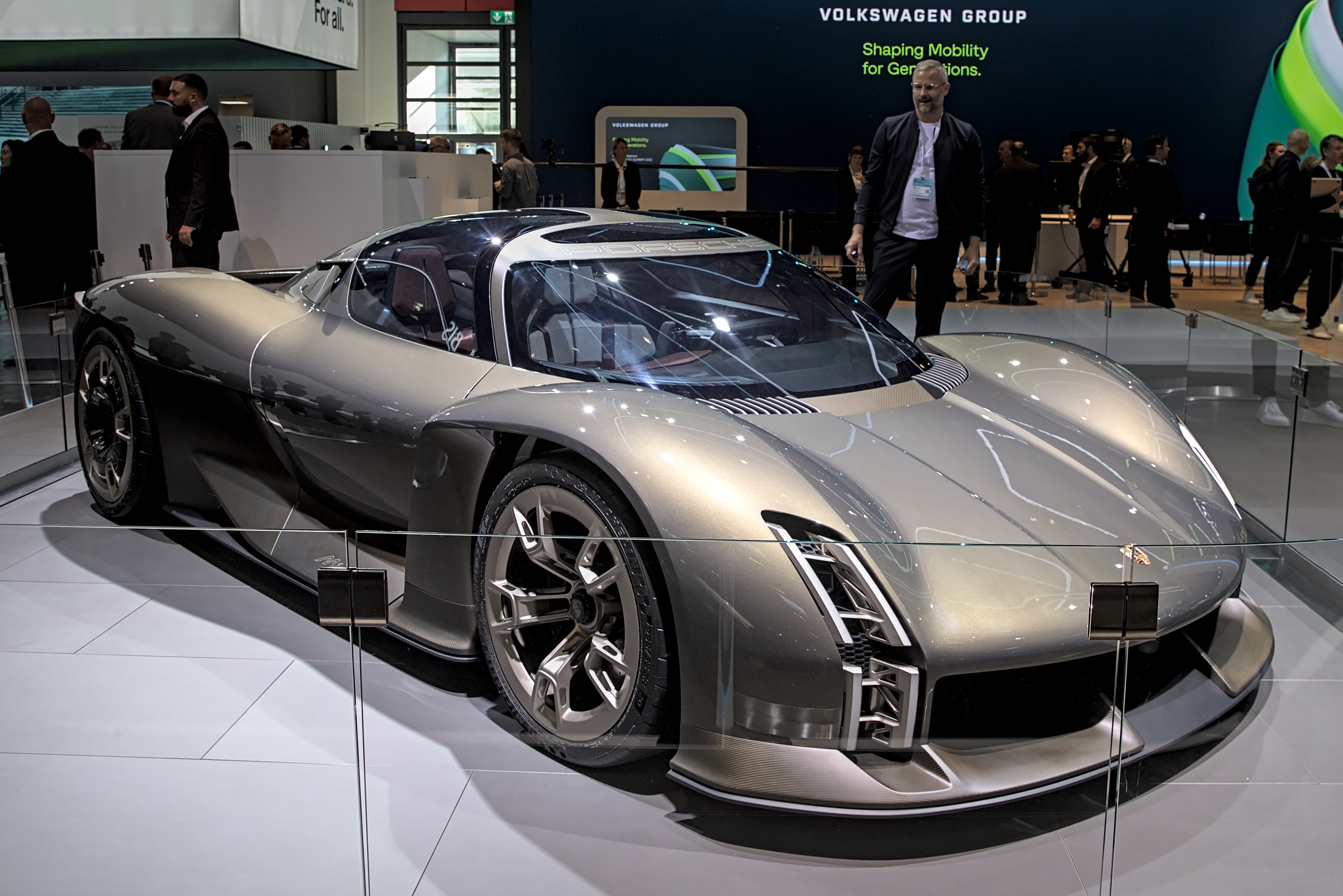

Overview
- Manufacturer: Porsche
- Production: 2023
- Assembly: Germany: Stuttgart, Zuffenhausen
- Designer: Michael Mauer (chief designer); James Burgess, Woo-sung Chung, Shūichi Yamashita, Matthias Walz (exterior); Tarek Ashour (interior)

Body and chassis
- Class: Concept sports car (S)
- Body style: 2-door coupé
- Layout: All-wheel-drive (electric)
- Doors: Scissor

Powertrain
- Engine: Electric
- Electric motor: 4 electric motors

Dimensions
- Wheelbase: 2,730 mm (107.5 in)
- Length: 4,500 mm (177.2 in)
- Width: 1,999.0 mm (78.7 in)
- Height: 1,200 mm (47.2 in)

Chronology
- Predecessor: Porsche 918 Spyder

The Porsche Mission X is an electric concept sports car manufactured by Porsche. It was presented in June 2023 and is set to be the successor of the Porsche 918 Spyder.

== Overview ==
Porsche Mission X at IAA 2023

The Mission X is said to have a 1:1 power to weight ratio, made possible with an electric motor instead of an internal combustion engine like the 918 Spyder, following the style of the Koenigsegg One:1. Porsche is aiming for this car to be the record holder for road-legal cars on the Nürburgring Nordschleife. Porsche also states that the battery for the 900-volt architecture will be situated behind the seats, much like a mid -engine car.

== History ==
The Mission X was presented in the preamble to the centenary of the 24 Hours of Le Mans, on 8 June 2023 on the occasion of the exhibition "75 years of Porsche Sports Cars" at the Porsche Museum in Zuffenhausen, in Stuttgart, Germany. It thus celebrates the 75th anniversary of the German brand with the release of the Porsche 356 roadster on 8 June 1948.

Since then, it has made a number of appearances in the car community. It was showcased at the 2024 Australian Grand Prix, the 2023 Icons of Porsche festival in Dubai and the 2023 Munich Motor Show.

== Build-up ==
As part of building hype for Porsche’s Mission X, Porsche has been actively showcasing the car around the world. Though many state the car may be delayed indefinitely, this has not yet been confirmed by Porsche.

== Media ==
The Mission X appears as a playable vehicle in Gran Turismo 7 as part of the 1.54 update.
