= Porsche Macan =

Compact luxury crossover SUV

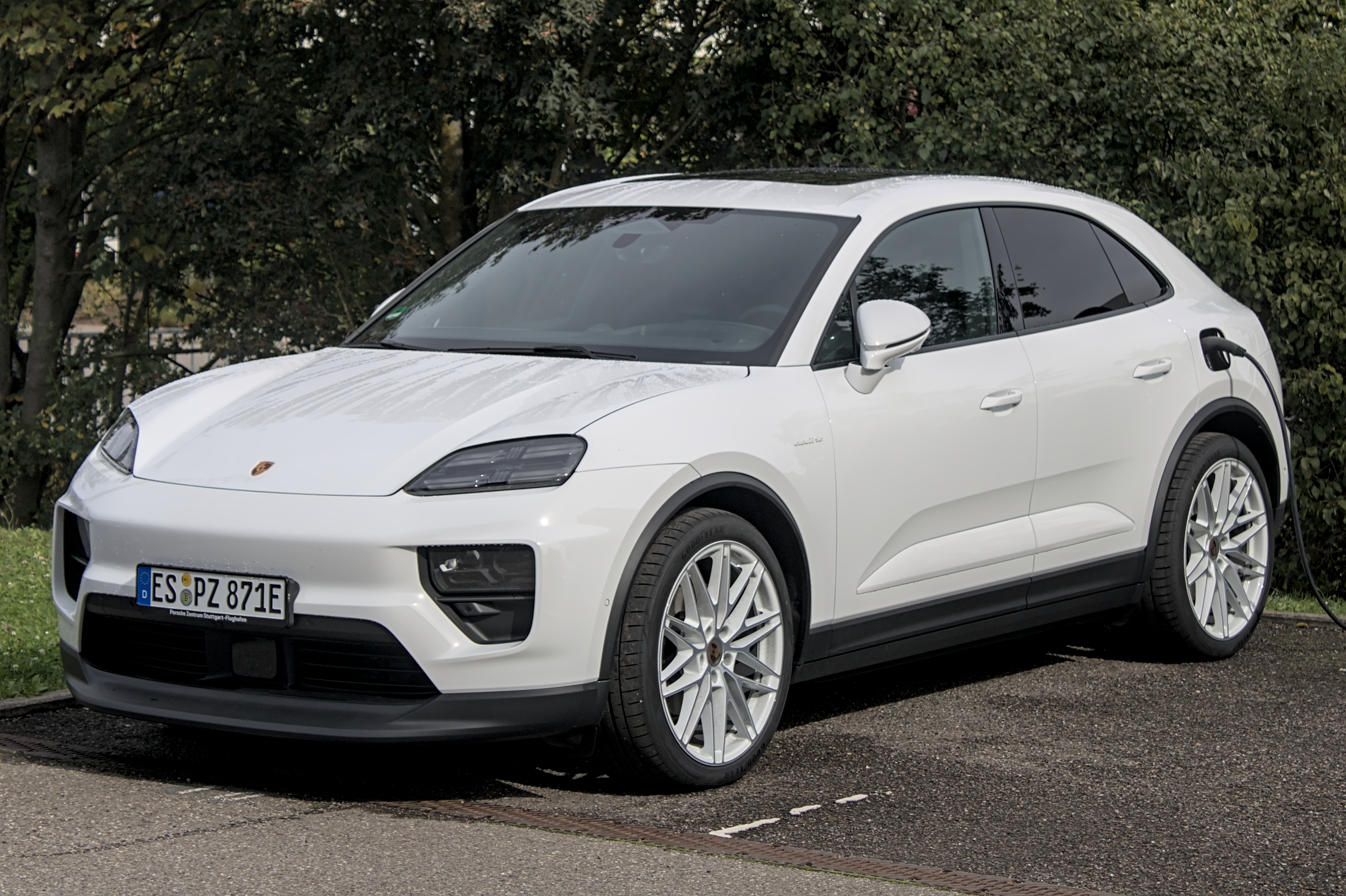
- 2024 Porsche Macan 4 Electric

Overview
- Manufacturer: Porsche AG
- Production: February 2014 – present
- Model years: 2015–present

Body and chassis
- Class: Compact luxury crossover SUV (D)
- Body style: 5-door SUV

Logo.

The Porsche Macan is a compact luxury crossover SUV (D-segment) produced by German manufacturer Porsche since 2014. It is the smaller SUV from Porsche below the Cayenne. The first-generation Macan entered production from February 2014 with petrol and diesel engine options. In 2024, Porsche released the second-generation Macan which is a battery electric vehicle built on the dedicated Premium Platform Electric (PPE) EV platform. The first-generation and second-generation Macan were initially marketed side-by-side, providing multiple powertrain options for consumers, until production of the first-generation ended in 2026.

Since 2015, its first full year in the market, the Macan has been the best-selling Porsche model globally ahead of the larger Cayenne.

== First generation (95B; 2014) ==
First generation
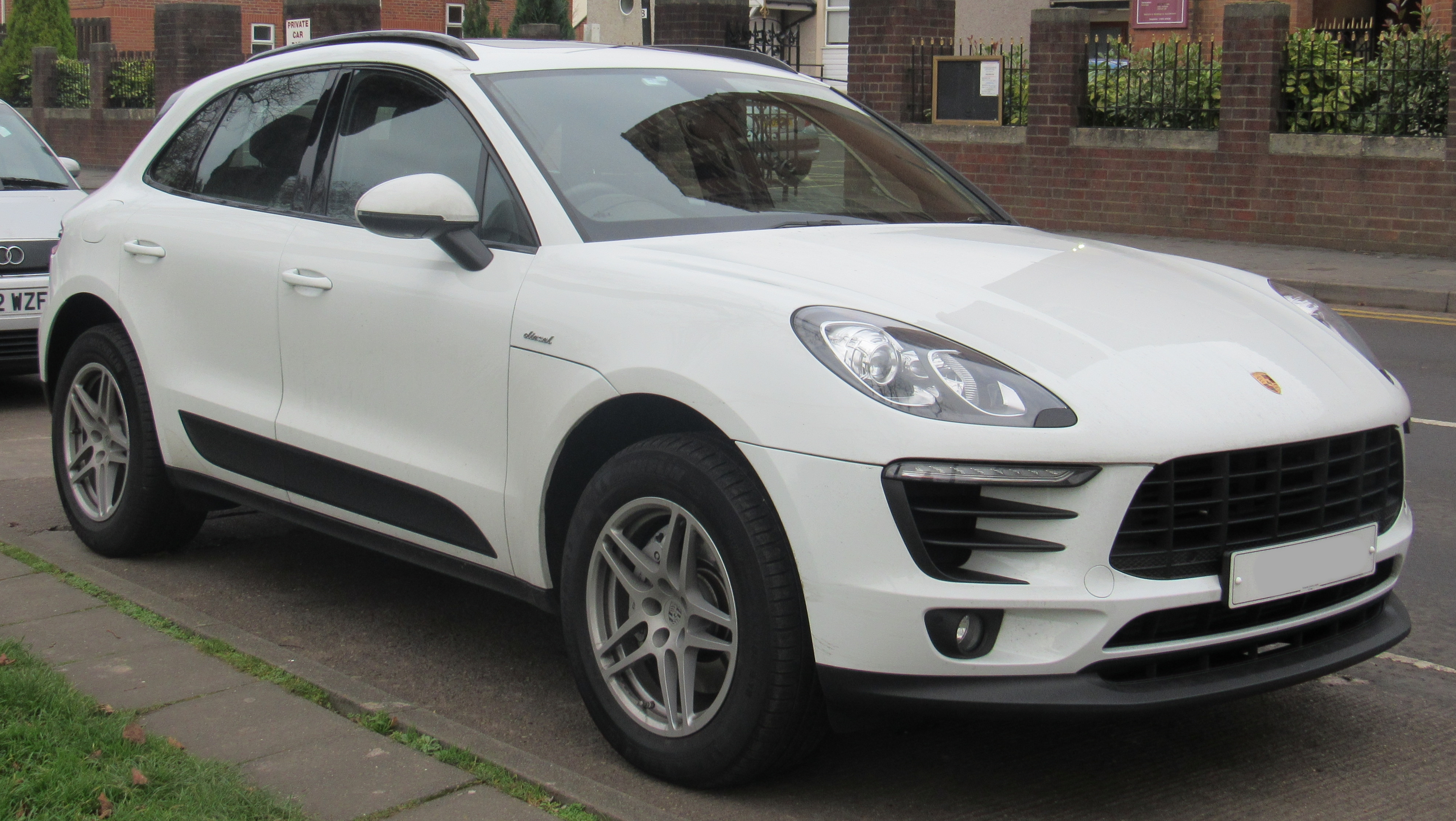
- 2017 Porsche Macan S (pre-facelift)

Overview
- Model code: Type 95B
- Production: February 2014–2026
- Model years: 2015–2026
- Assembly: Germany: Leipzig
- Designer: Michael Mauer

Body and chassis
- Layout: Front-engine, all-wheel-drive
- Related: Audi Q5 (8R)

Powertrain
- Engine: Petrol: 2.0 L Volkswagen-Audi EA888T Gen 3 (CNCD) TFSI I4 turbo; 2.9 L Volkswagen-Audi EA839TT TFSI V6 twin-turbo; 3.0 L Volkswagen-Audi EA839T TFSI V6 turbo; 3.0 L Porsche M4630 V6 twin-turbo; 3.6 L Porsche M4635 V6 twin-turbo; Diesel: 3.0 L Volkswagen-Audi EA897TD TDI V6 turbo
- Transmission: 7-speed PDK

Dimensions
- Wheelbase: 2,807 mm (110.5 in)
- Length: 4,681–4,726 mm (184.3–186.1 in)
- Width: 1,923 mm (75.7 in)
- Height: 1,624 mm (63.9 in)
- Kerb weight: 1,865–1,925 kg (4,111.6–4,243.9 lb) (DIN)

Initially announced in November 2010 as a development project, and formally announced by Porsche in March 2011, the 'Macan' model name was decided in 2012 and is derived from the Indonesian word for tiger. It was known by its code name Cajun, a portmanteau of Cayenne Junior or comes from a name of a member of ethnic group descended from Acadia living in the U.S. state of Louisiana.

The production version of the Macan was unveiled at the 2013 Los Angeles Auto Show and 2013 Tokyo Motor Show. European models went on sales in spring 2014 and the initial line-up of models included the Macan S and Macan Turbo. U.S. market models arrived at dealerships in late spring 2014 as 2015 model year vehicle. Early models included Macan S and Macan Turbo.

The Porsche Macan shares its platform and wheelbase with the first generation Audi Q5 (2008–2017). The suspension configuration is based on, and heavily modified from the Audi, but the engine, transfer case, suspension tuning, interior and exterior body are unique to the Macan. It is also 1.7 in (43 mm) longer and 1.4 in (36 mm) wider than a Q5.

The Macan is produced alongside the Panamera in Leipzig, Germany in a newly extended factory. The Macan is also intended to be 'sportier' than the Cayenne; for instance the Macan has a standard 7-speed dual-clutch PDK gearbox, which is more responsive, while the Cayenne has an 8-speed Tiptronic transmission for smoother shifts.

In July 2018, Porsche announced that more than 350,000 units of the Macan have been delivered worldwide since 2014, with over 100,000 deliveries in the Chinese market alone.

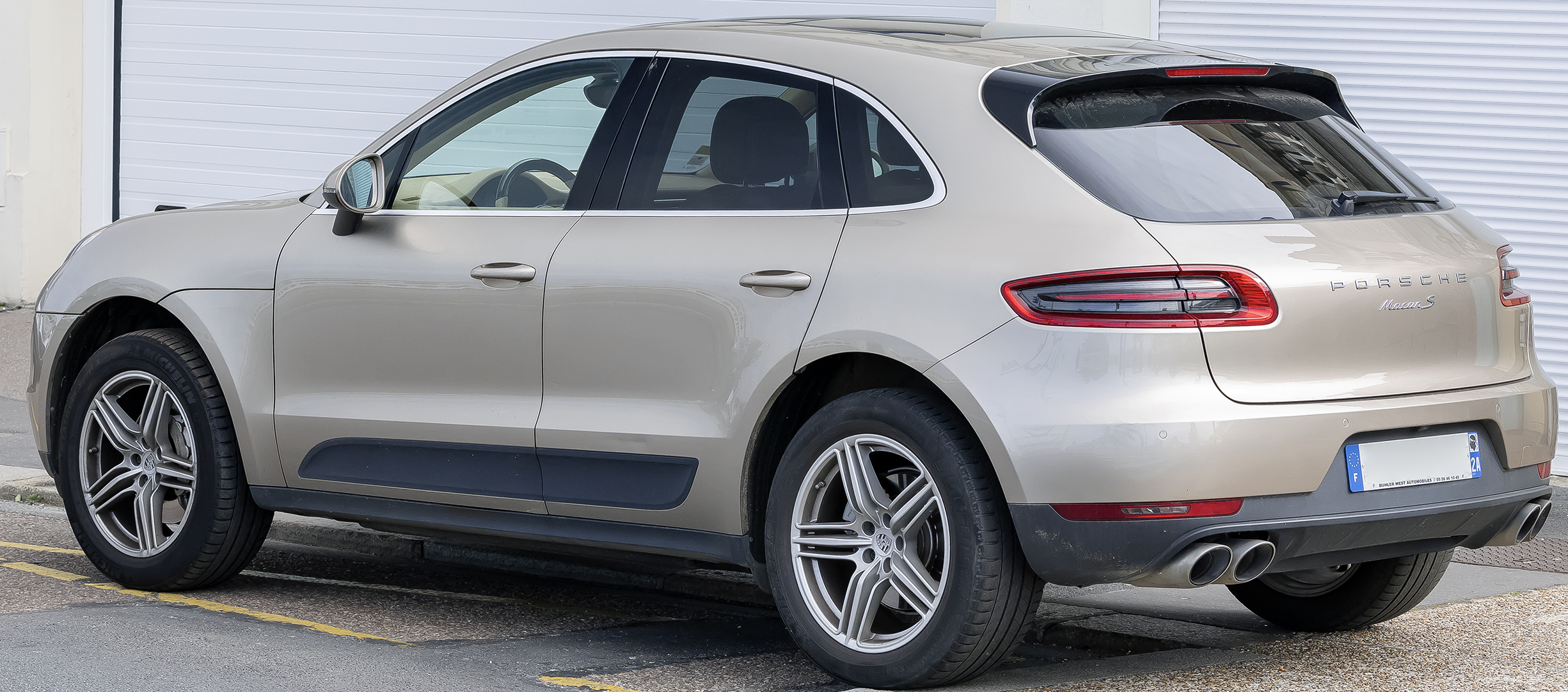
Rear view (Macan S)

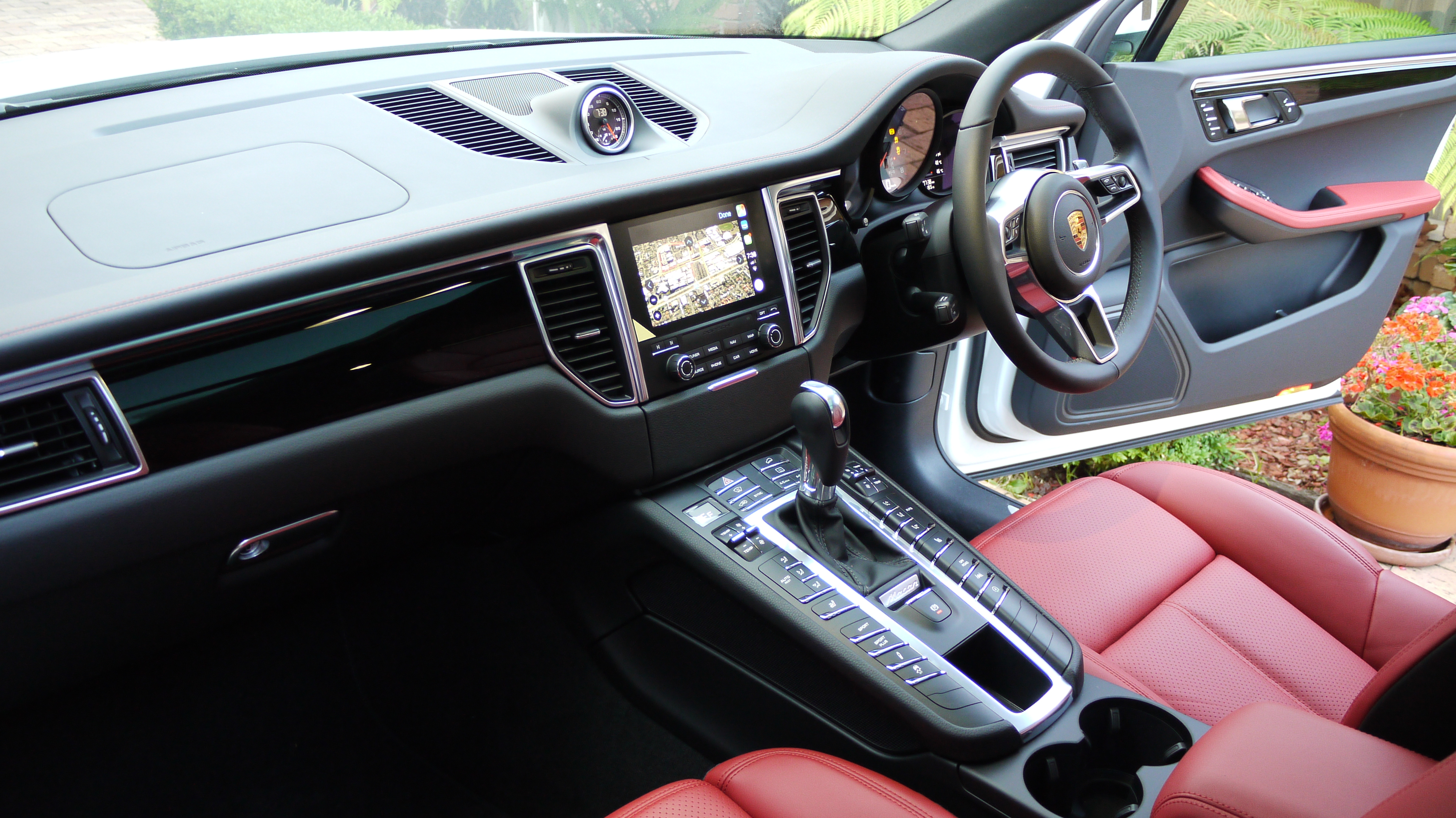
Interior (Macan S)

=== Drivetrain and performance ===
At launch, three different models and engines were available, all being V6 format: a 3.0-litre Macan S with 340 PS (250 kW; 335 bhp), a 3.6-litre Macan Turbo with 400 PS (294 kW; 395 bhp) and a 3.0-litre, 258 PS (190 kW; 254 bhp) Diesel, with a CO_{2} emissions of 159 g/km. The Macan GTS was announced in October 2015 to fit into the gap between the Macan S and Macan Turbo.

All Macans feature a seven-speed PDK dual-clutch transmission and all-wheel drive, with several options available including air suspension and Porsche Active Suspension Management (PASM).

Porsche subsequently released a base Macan for select Asian markets and the United Kingdom. Using a reworked version of the Volkswagen Group's 2.0-litre inline-four EA888 Gen 3 engine used in multiple applications such as the Volkswagen GTI, Audi Q5, the Macan was the first Porsche to be powered by a four-cylinder since the Porsche 968, just preceding the four-cylinder Porsche 718 (Boxster and Cayman). This engine became offered globally for the Macan's 2017 model year following an announcement in March 2016. A 204 PS (150 kW; 201 bhp), 2.0-litre four-cylinder diesel was due to join the range at a later date. But this engine variant was never actually offered in any market worldwide.

Model	Displacement & Configuration	Max. Power at rpm	Max. Torque at rpm	Max. Speed	CO_{2} Emissions	Notes
Macan	Volkswagen-Audi EA888T 2.0 litres (1,984 cc) I4 turbo	252 PS (185 kW; 249 bhp) at 5,000–6,800	370 N⋅m (273 lbf⋅ft) at 1,500–4,500	229 km/h (142 mph)	167–172 g/km	Initially available in the United Kingdom and some Asian, Latin American and South American markets only. Globally available from March 2016. Front brakes: 4 piston aluminium monobloc fixed calipers with 345mm internally ventilated brake discs.
Macan Diesel	Volkswagen-Audi EA897TD 3.0 litres (2,967 cc) V6 turbodiesel	211 PS (155 kW; 208 bhp) at 2,750–4,000	580 N⋅m (428 lbf⋅ft) at 1,750–2,500	216 km/h (134 mph)	159–164 g/km	Available in Norway and Belgium. Front brakes: 6 piston aluminium monobloc fixed calipers with 350mm internally ventilated brake discs, rear: single-piston floating calipers with 330 mm internally ventilated brake discs.
Macan S Diesel	Volkswagen-Audi EA897TD 3.0 litres (2,967 cc) V6 turbodiesel	258 PS (190 kW; 254 bhp) at 4,000–4,250	580 N⋅m (428 lbf⋅ft) at 1,750–2,500	230 km/h (143 mph)	159–164 g/km	245 hp version available in some Asian, African & South American markets. Front brakes: 6 piston aluminium monobloc fixed calipers with 350mm internally ventilated brake discs, rear: single-piston floating calipers with 330 mm internally ventilated brake discs. (discontinued)
Macan S	Porsche M4630 3.0 litres (2,997 cc) V6 twin-turbo	340 PS (250 kW; 335 bhp) at 5,500–6,500	460 N⋅m (339 lbf⋅ft) at 1,450–5,000	254 km/h (158 mph)	204–212 g/km	Front brakes: 6 piston aluminium monobloc fixed calipers with 350mm internally ventilated brake discs, rear: single-piston floating calipers with 330 mm internally ventilated brake discs.
Macan GTS	Porsche M4630 3.0 litres (2,997 cc) V6 twin-turbo	360 PS (265 kW; 355 bhp) at 6000	500 N⋅m (369 lbf⋅ft) at 1,650–4,000	256 km/h (159 mph)	207–215 g/km	Front brakes: 6 piston aluminium monobloc fixed calipers with 360mm internally ventilated brake discs, rear: single-piston floating calipers with 330 mm internally ventilated brake discs.
Macan Turbo	Porsche M4635 3.6 litres (3,604 cc) V6 twin-turbo	400 PS (294 kW; 395 bhp) at 6,000	550 N⋅m (406 lbf⋅ft) at 1,350–4,500	266 km/h (165 mph)	208–216 g/km	Front brakes: 6 piston aluminium monobloc fixed calipers with 360mm internally ventilated brake discs, rear: single-piston floating calipers with 356 mm internally ventilated brake discs.
Macan Turbo w/Perf. Pkg	Porsche M4635 3.6 litres (3,604 cc) V6 twin-turbo	440 PS (324 kW; 434 bhp) at 6,000	600 N⋅m (443 lbf⋅ft) at 1,500–4,500	270 km/h (168 mph)	208–216 g/km	Front brakes: 6 piston aluminium monobloc fixed calipers with 396mm internally ventilated ceramic composite brake discs, rear: single-piston floating calipers with 356 mm internally ventilated ceramic composite brake discs.

The Macan S and Macan Turbo have 0–60 mph (0–97 km/h) times of 5.2 seconds and 4.6 seconds respectively. Both times are improved by 0.2 seconds when employing Launch Control (feature of the optional "Sport Chrono" package).

=== Updates ===
==== 2016 update ====
Changes to the Macan for 2016 include Porsche Communication Management system, optional full-LED headlights, redesigned steering controller, extended exterior and interior packages for Macan Turbo.

===== Macan GTS =====
The Macan GTS was unveiled at the 2015 Tokyo Motor Show. The vehicles went on sale at Porsche dealers in early 2016, while orders began in Germany in 2015.

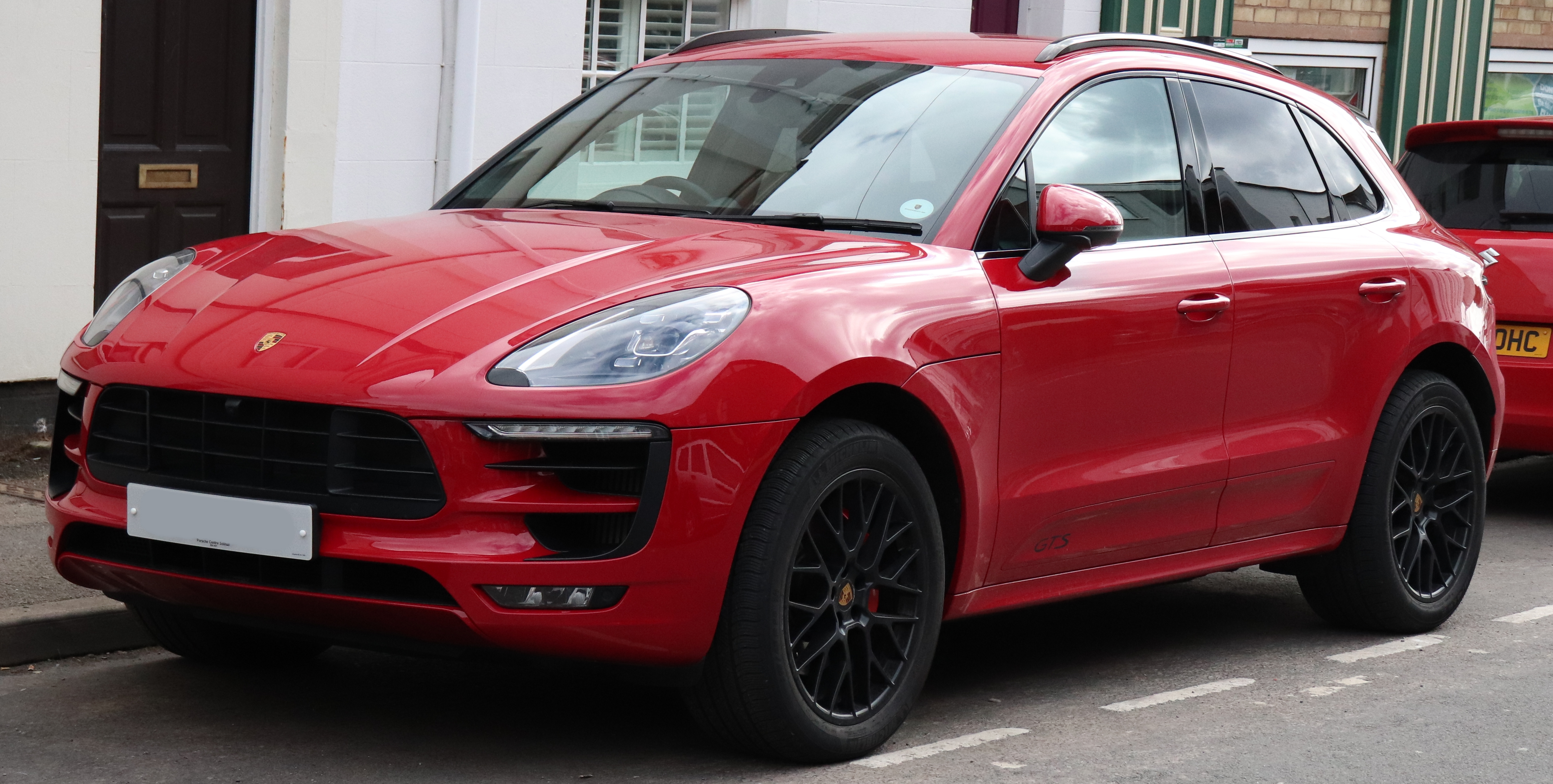
Macan GTS (pre-facelift)

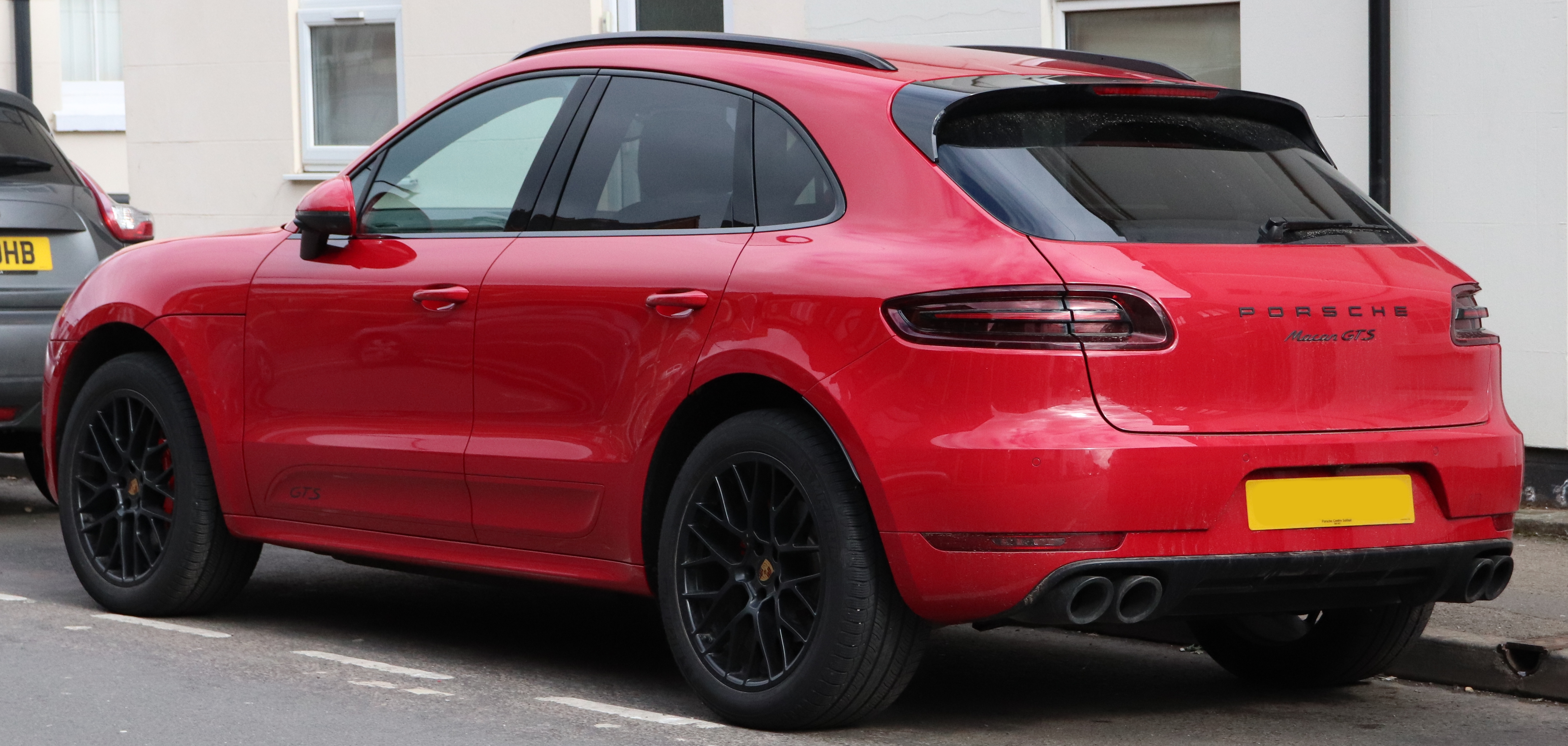
Rear view (pre-facelift)

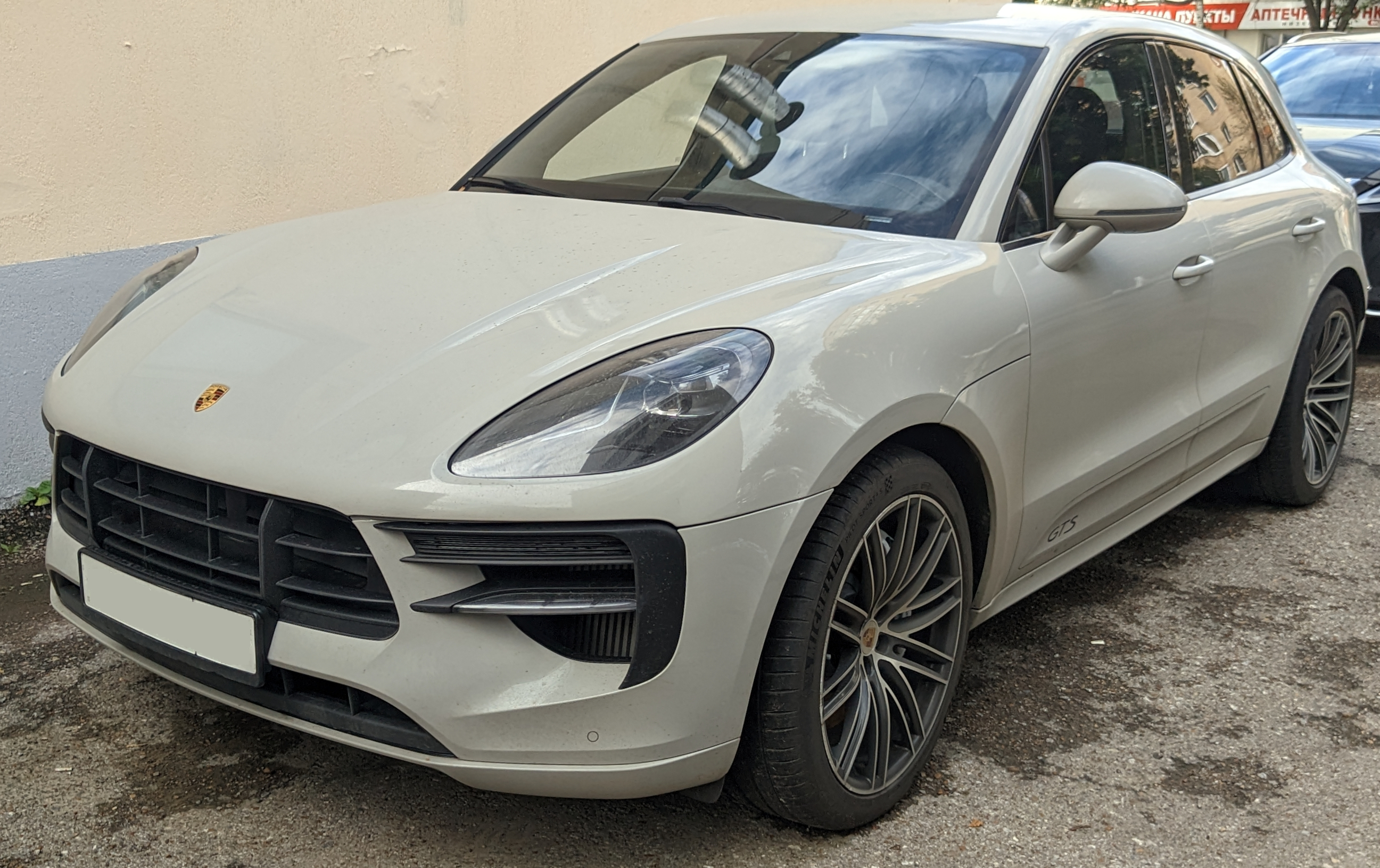
Macan GTS (facelift)

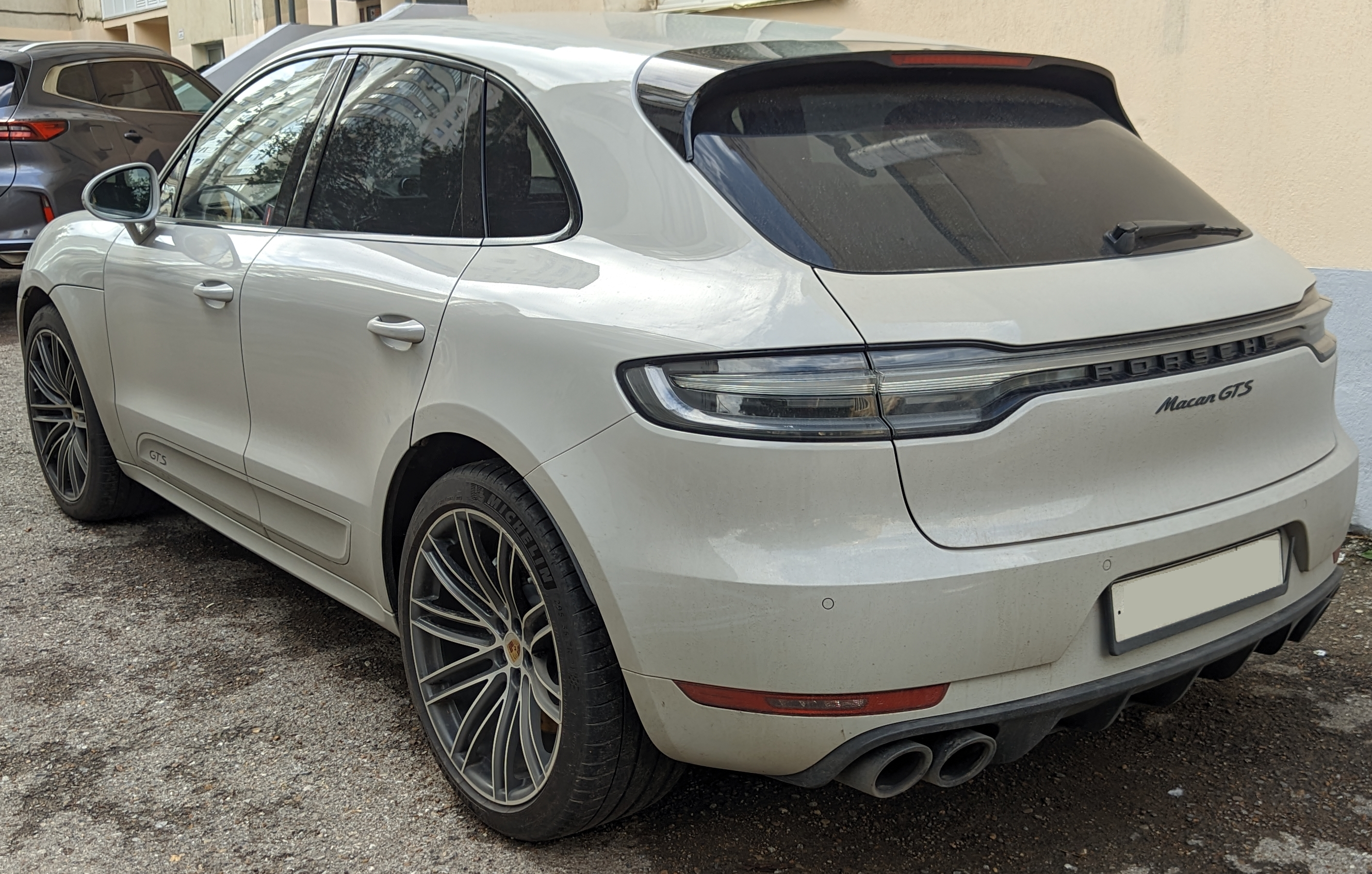
Rear view (facelift)

===== Four-cylinder model =====
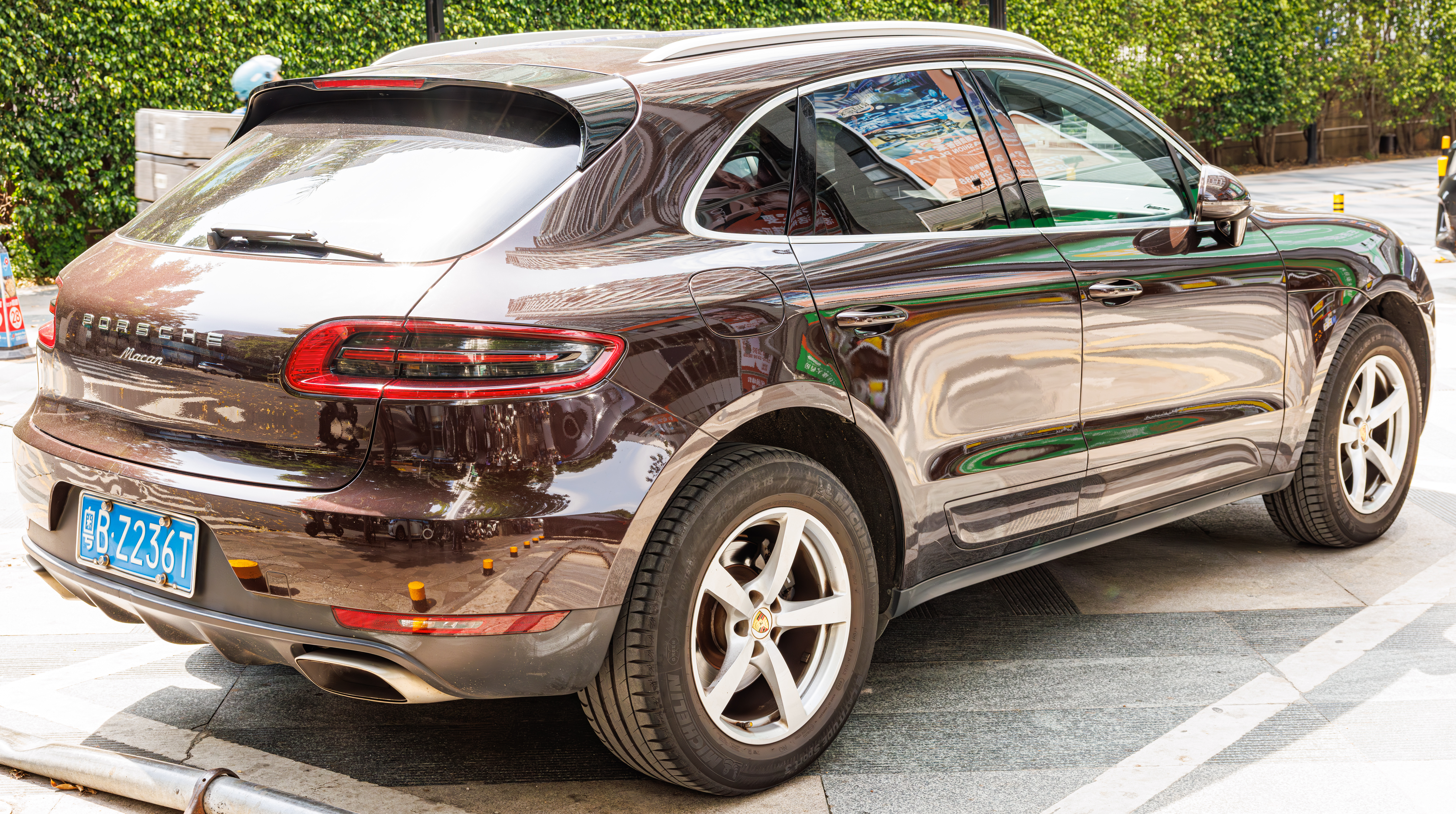
(Chinese Market Macan shown) The base Macan has the standard rectangular dual exhaust tips

Unveiled at the 2016 New York International Auto Show, the base Macan joined the range with an inline-four turbocharged 2.0-litre engine, matte black window surrounds, brake calipers in black, unique dual exhaust pipes in stainless steel, front fascia and lava black side blades from the Macan S, seat centres in Alcantara, the newest generation of Porsche Communication Management (PCM), Piano Black interior package, park assist and a lane departure warning system. The engine is a 2.0-liter four-cylinder turbo, closely related to the engine found in the Golf GTI ‘Performance Pack’ and sending 233bhp and 258lb ft of torque to the wheels through Porsche's seven-speed ‘PDK’ gearbox. The four-cylinder model went on sale in the United States and globally as a 2017 model year vehicle, with deliveries beginning in July 2016.

Sport Edition (2018)

(Macan S shown) The Sport Edition from the rear with the Porsche Sport Exhaust (PSE) and 20' Spyder Design wheels

In 2017, Porsche announced the Macan Sport Edition, a trim level that was offered for the 2018 model year only. This trim included Porsche Active Suspension Management (PASM) and Porsche Sport Exhaust (PSE), along with the Sport Chrono packages as standard. The Sport Edition used the same EA888 engine as the base Macan. It also features quad exhaust tips, rather than the standard dual exit exhaust tips, as well as 20” Spyder RS design wheels as standard. The Macan T introduced for the 2023 model year is similar to the Sport Edition. The Sport Edition is purely cosmetic, with additional packages as standard equipment. There is no significant difference between the Sport Edition and base models other than cosmetic differences.

==== 2019 update ====
The 2019 model year Macan was first unveiled in July 2018 in Shanghai as petrol four-cylinder base model and received its European debut at the 2018 Paris Motor Show. It went into production in August 2018. Changes to the previous model include an overhauled chassis, a gasoline particulate filter fitted as standard, a new front and rear fascia with LED head- and tail-lights as standard, new exterior colours and wheel designs, and a redesigned interior with Porsche Communication Management with 10.9-inch touchscreen display and Connect Plus with Porsche Offroad Precision App as standard. Optionally available systems include active suspension management, air suspension, torque vectoring, Sport Chrono package including Launch Control as well as park and traffic assistance systems.

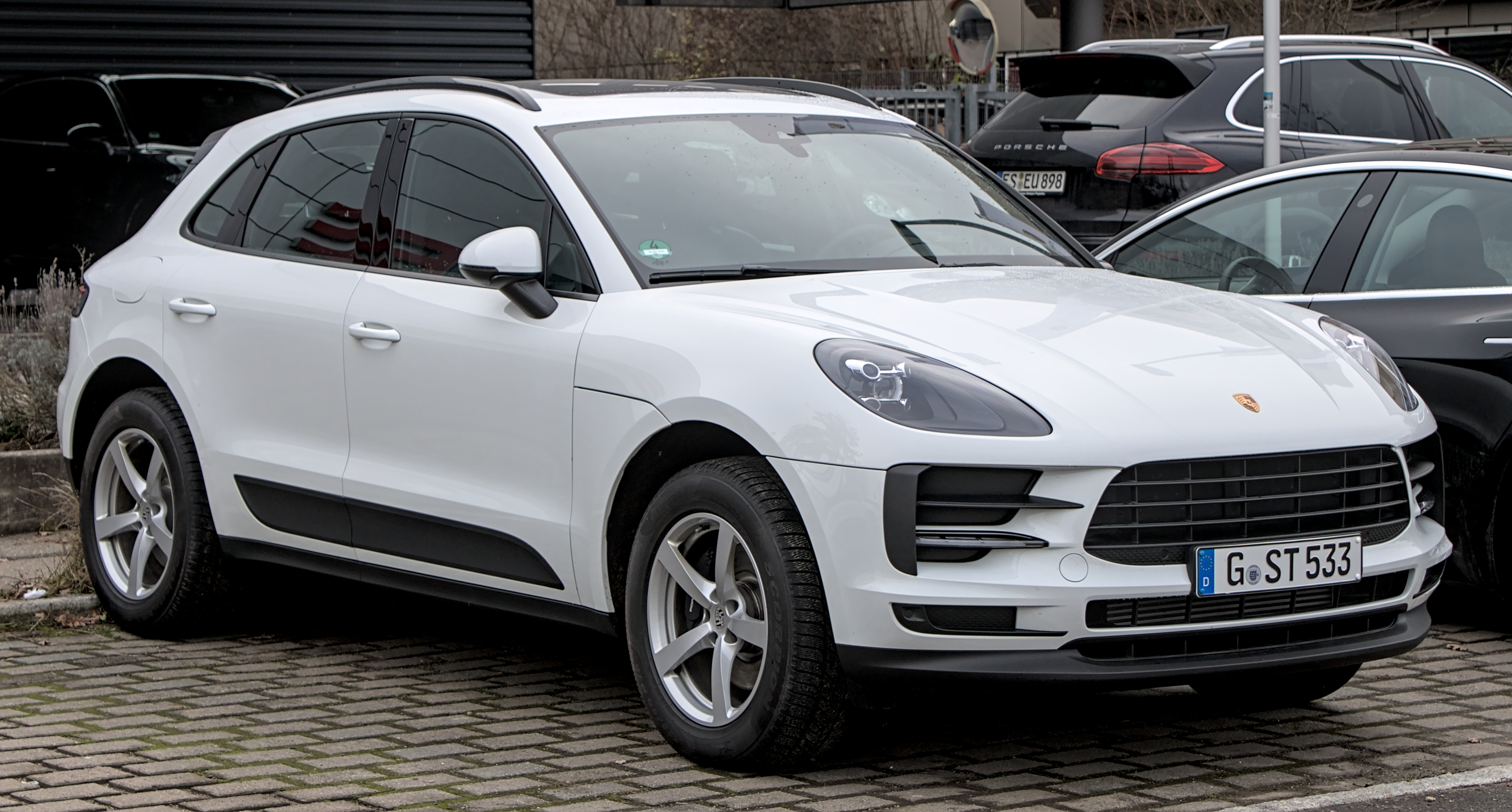
2019 refresh

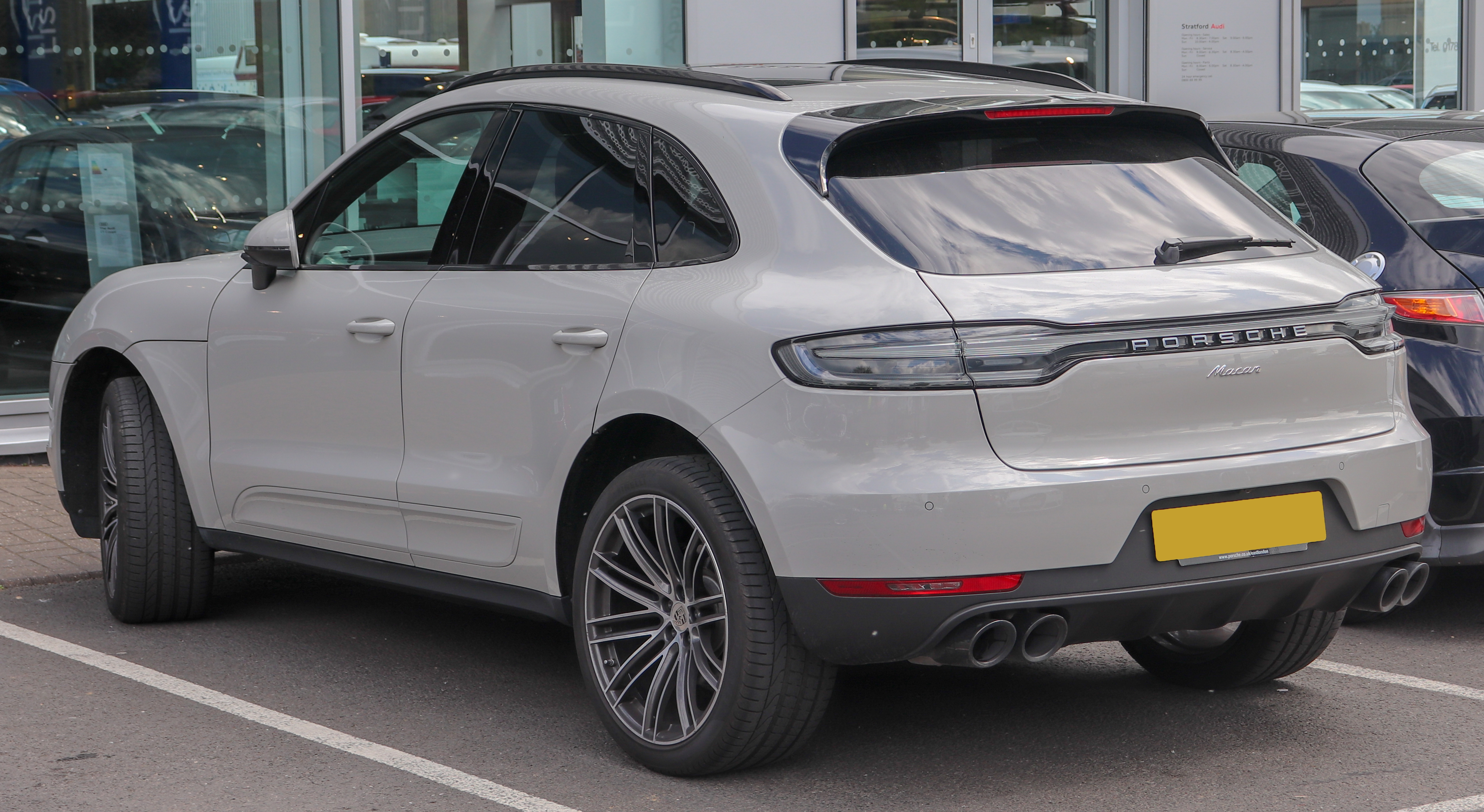
Rear view

===== Specifications =====
Model	Years of Production	Engine & Displacement	Power at rpm	Torque at rpm	DIN Kerb Weight	0–100 km/h (0–62 mph)	Top speed	CO_{2} Emissions
Macan*	2019–2021	Volkswagen-Audi EA888T 2.0 L (1,984 cc) Turbo I4	253 PS (186 kW; 250 hp) at 5,000–6,750	370 N⋅m (273 lbf⋅ft) at 1,600–4,500	1,795 kg (3,957 lb)	6.7 s (6.5 s Sport Chrono)	140 mph (225 km/h)	185–186 g/km
Macan S	2019–2021	Volkswagen-Audi EA839T 3.0 L (2,995 cc) Turbo V6	354 PS (260 kW; 349 hp) at 5,400–6,400	480 N⋅m (354 lbf⋅ft) at 1,360–4,800	1,865 kg (4,112 lb)	5.3 s (5.1 s Sport Chrono)	159 mph (256 km/h)	204 g/km
Macan GTS	2020–2021	Volkswagen-Audi EA839TT 2.9 L (2,894 cc) Twin Turbo V6	380 PS (279 kW; 375 hp) at 5,200–6,700	520 N⋅m (384 lbf⋅ft) at 1,750–5,000	1,910 kg (4,211 lb)	4.9 s (4.7 s Sport Chrono)	164 mph (264 km/h)	218 g/km
Macan Turbo	2019–2021	Volkswagen-Audi EA839TT 2.9 L (2,894 cc) Twin Turbo V6	440 PS (324 kW; 434 hp) at 5,700–6,600	550 N⋅m (406 lbf⋅ft) at 1,800–5,600	1,945 kg (4,288 lb)	4.5 s (4.3 s Sport Chrono)	169 mph (272 km/h)	224 g/km

_{* Available data for European model}

==== 2021 update ====
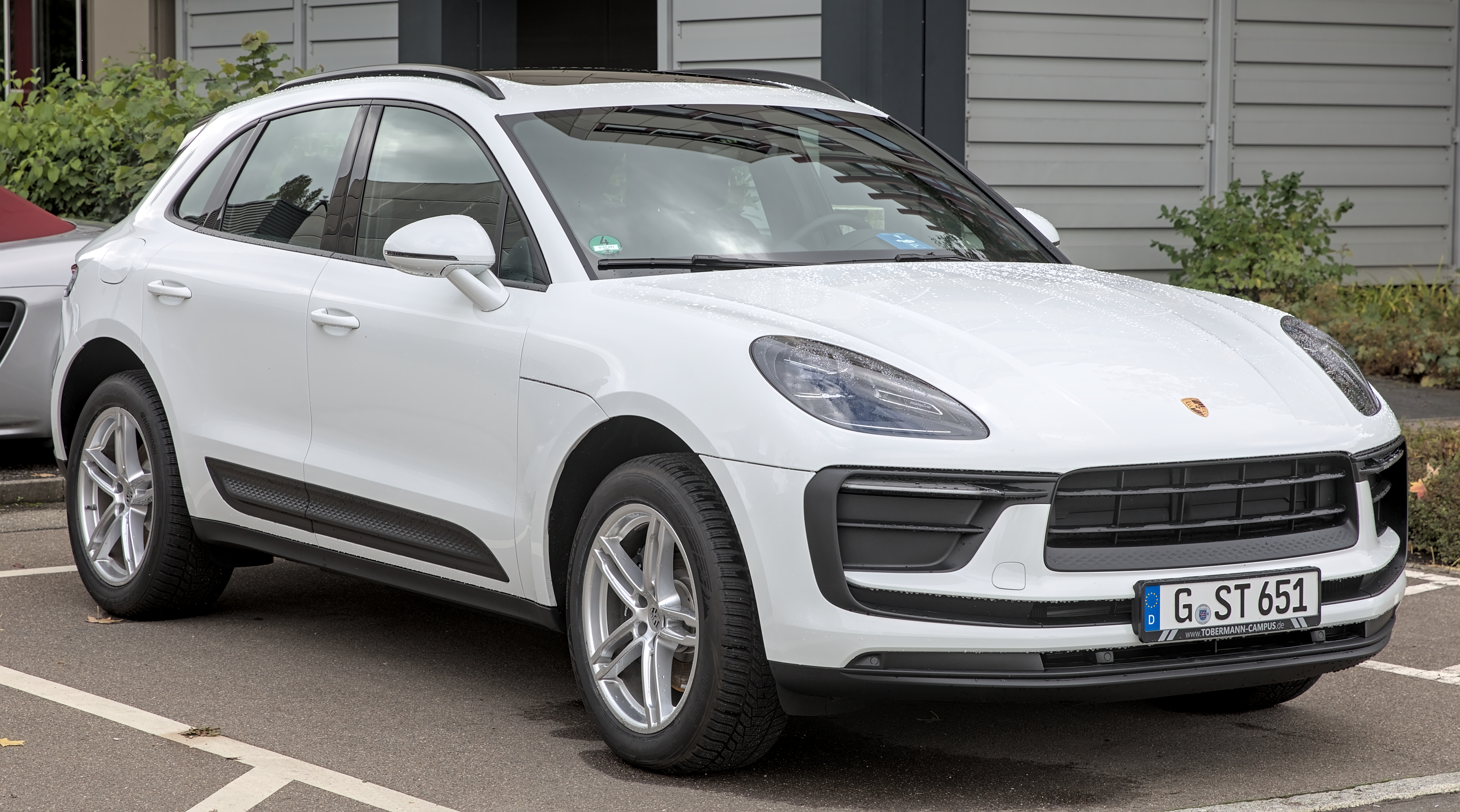
2021 refresh

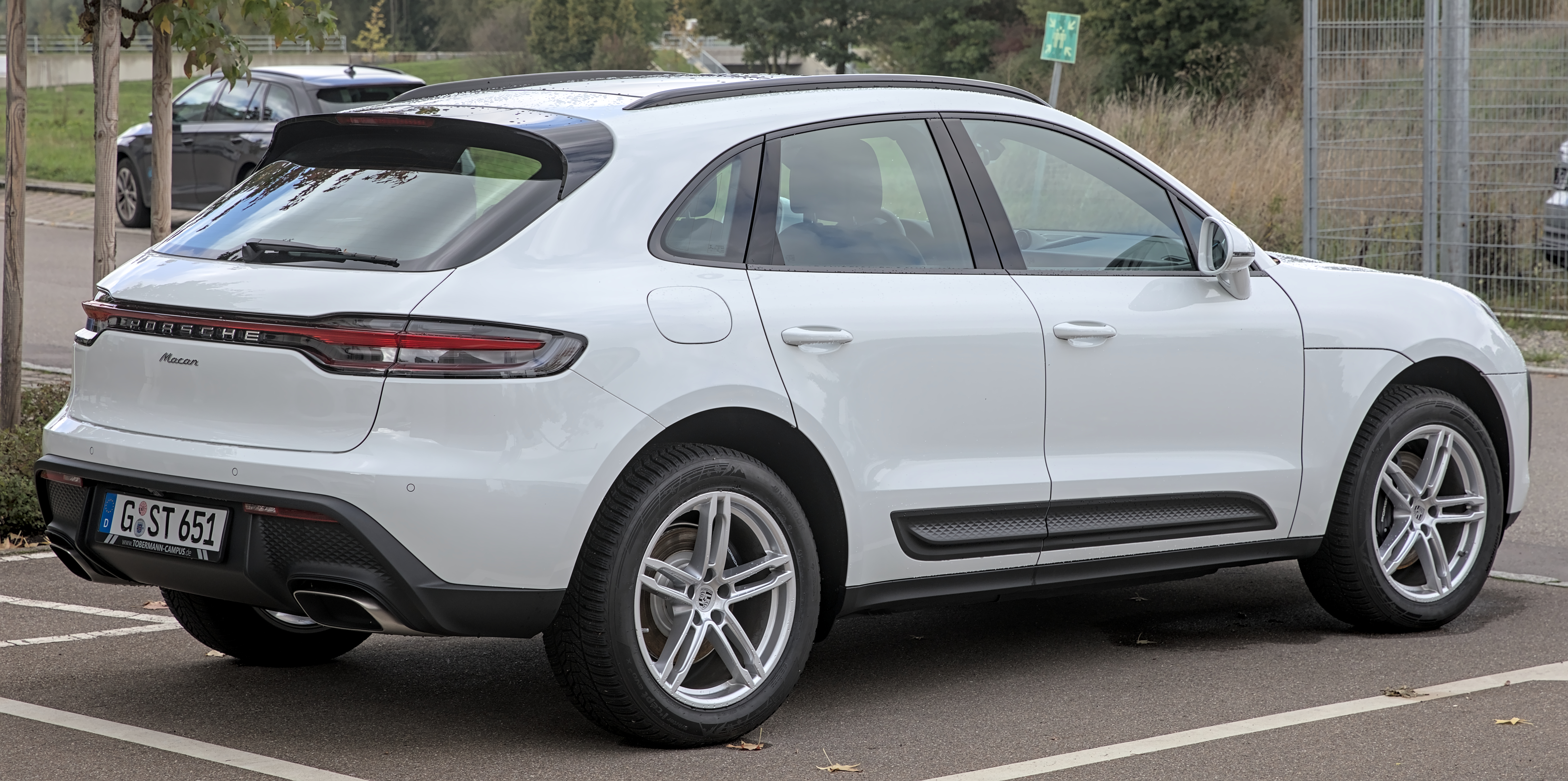
Rear view of Macan S

Model	Years of Production	Engine & Displacement	Power at rpm	Torque at rpm	DIN Kerb Weight	0–100 km/h (0–62 mph)	Top speed	CO_{2} Emissions
Macan*	2021–present	Volkswagen-Audi EA888T 2.0 L (1,984 cc) Turbo I4	265 PS (195 kW; 261 hp) at 5,000–6,500	400 N⋅m (295 lbf⋅ft) at 1,800–4,500	1,845 kg (4,068 lb)	6.4 s (6.2 s Sport Chrono)	146 mph (235 km/h)	198-200 g/km
Macan T	2022–present	Volkswagen-Audi EA888T 2.0 L (1,984 cc) Turbo I4	265 PS (195 kW; 261 hp) at 5,000	400 N⋅m (295 lbf⋅ft) at 1,800	2,000 kg (4,409 lb)	6.2 s	146 mph (235 km/h)	200 g/km
Macan S	2021–present	Volkswagen-Audi EA839TT 2.9 L (2,894 cc) Twin Turbo V6	380 PS (279 kW; 375 hp) at 5,200–6,700	520 N⋅m (384 lbf⋅ft) at 1,800–5,000	1,865 kg (4,112 lb)	4.8 s (4.6 s Sport Chrono)	159 mph (256 km/h)	224 g/km
Macan GTS	2022–present	Volkswagen-Audi EA839TT 2.9 L (2,894 cc) Twin Turbo V6	440 PS (324 kW; 434 hp) at 5,700–6,600	550 N⋅m (406 lbf⋅ft) at 1,900–5,600	1,960 kg (4,321 lb)	4.5 s (4.3 s Sport Chrono)	168 mph (270 km/h)	225 g/km

_{* Available data for European model}

=== Safety ===
Euro NCAP test results* Porsche Macan, Small Off-Road (2014)
Test	Points	%
Overall:	5 /5 stars	
Adult occupant:	33	88%
Child occupant:	43	87%
Pedestrian:	22	60%
Safety assist:	9	66%

== Second generation (XAB; 2024) ==
Second generation
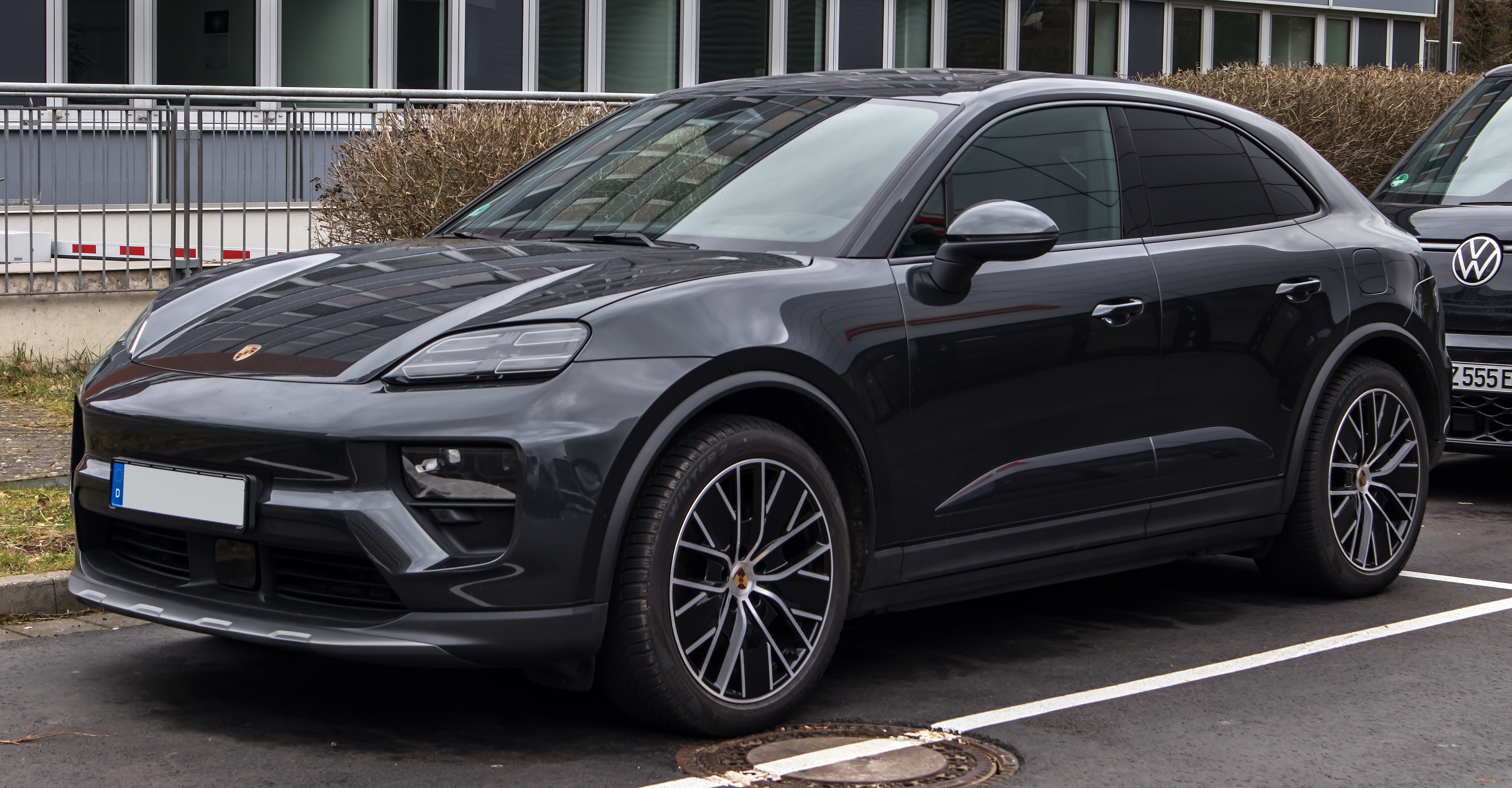
- 2025 Porsche Macan Electric

Overview
- Model code: Type XAB
- Production: May 2024 – present
- Model years: 2025–present
- Assembly: Germany: Leipzig
- Designer: Michael Mauer, Woosung Chung

Body and chassis
- Layout: Rear-motor, rear-wheel-drive; Dual-motors, all-wheel-drive
- Platform: Premium Platform Electric (PPE)
- Related: Audi Q6 e-tron Audi A6 e-tron Porsche Cayenne IV

Powertrain
- Electric motor: 2× permanent magnet synchronous
- Power output: Macan: 250 kW (335 hp); Macan 4: 300 kW (402 hp); Macan 4S: 330 kW (443 hp); Macan Turbo: 470 kW (630 hp)
- Transmission: Single-speed automatic
- Battery: 95 kWh Li-NMC
- Range: 591–613 km (367–381 mi) (WLTP Combined)
- Plug-in charging: 270 kW DC; 11 kW AC; V2L: 0.15 kW

Dimensions
- Wheelbase: 2,893 mm (113.9 in)
- Length: 4,784 mm (188.3 in)
- Width: 1,938 mm (76.3 in)
- Height: 1,622 mm (63.9 in)
- Kerb weight: 2,330–2,405 kg (5,137–5,302 lb) (DIN)

On 25 January 2024, Porsche revealed the second-generation Macan which will be available only with a battery electric powertrain. Production began in May 2024 at the Leipzig plant alongside the older ICE version of the Macan. Porsche initially sold the new electric model alongside the original Macan, which it updated in 2021, until the original Macan ended production in summer 2026. It uses the same Premium Platform Electric (PPE) platform shared with the upcoming Audi Q6 e-tron.

The Macan features three screens: a curved 12.6-inch instrument cluster, a 10.9-inch infotainment system, and an optional 10.9-inch screen for the front passenger. It also utilizes a voice assistant and other driver aid technology.

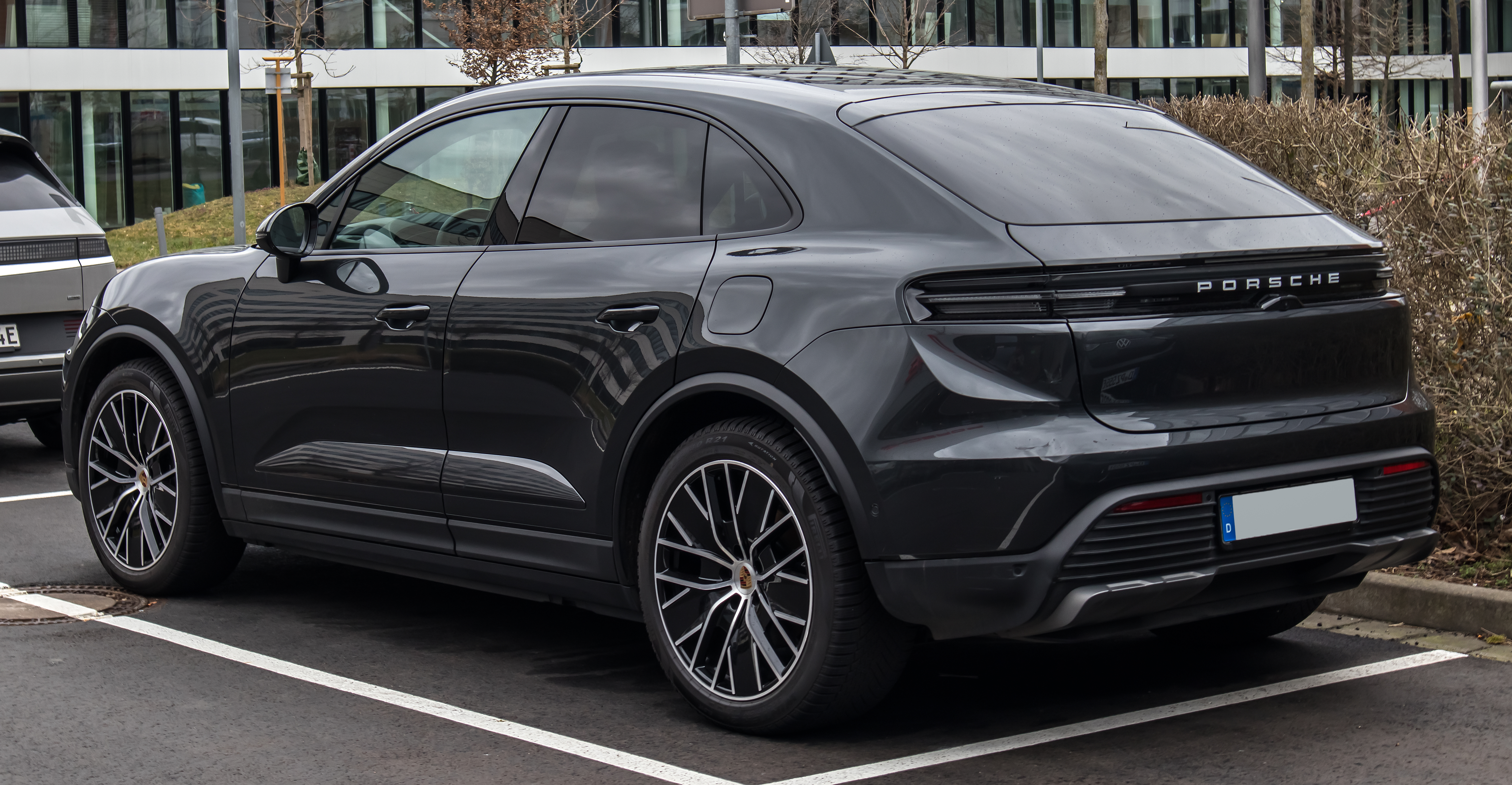
Rear view

Macan GTS

Rear view (Macan GTS)

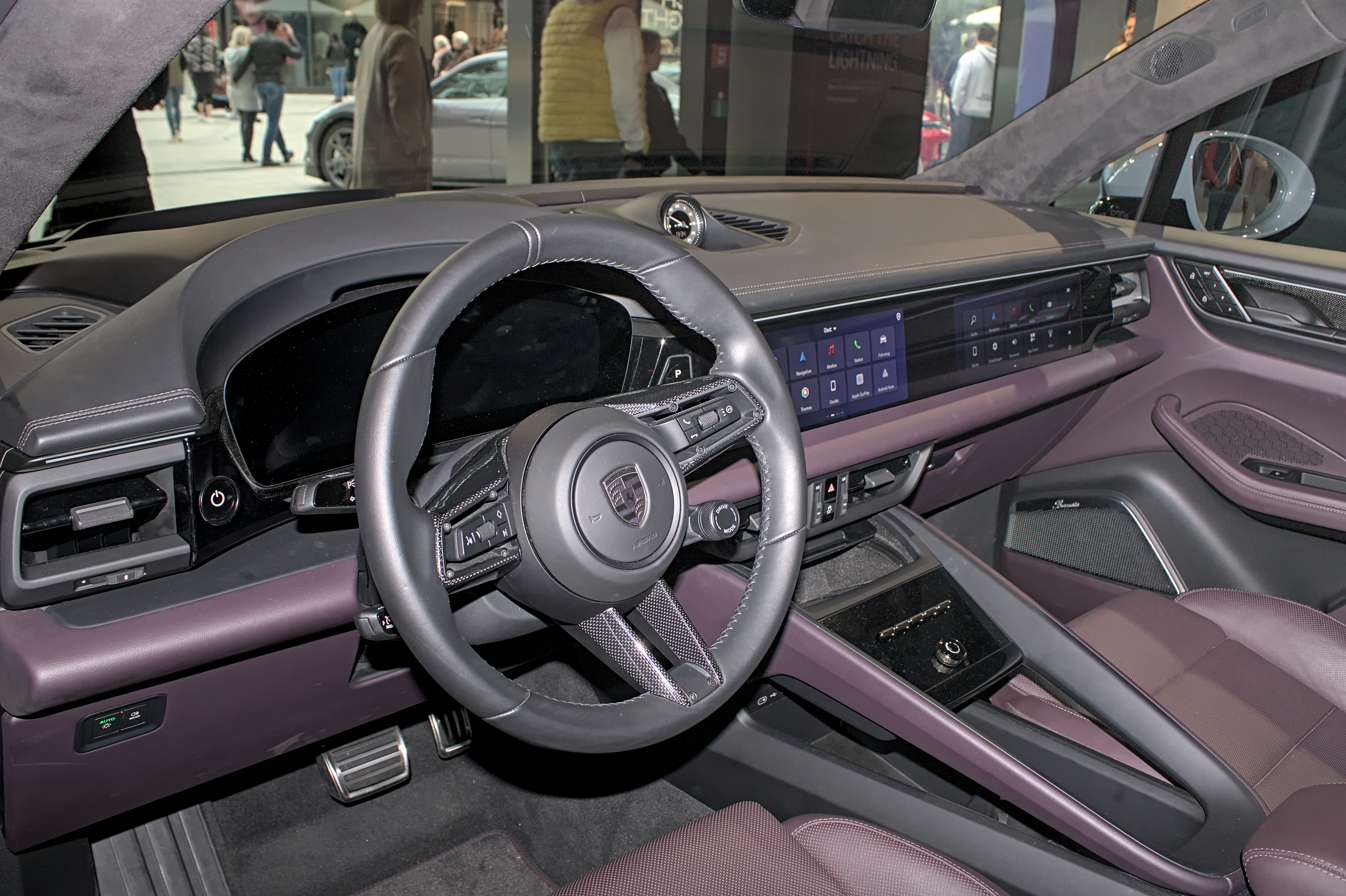
Interior (Macan Turbo)

=== Powertrains ===
Model	Years of Production	Motors	Power	Torque	DIN Kerb Weight	0–100 km/h (62 mph)	Top speed	WLTP
Macan Electric	2024–present	One (rear)	250–264 kW (340–359 PS; 335–354 hp)	563 N⋅m (415 lbf⋅ft)	2,330 kg (5,137 lb)	5.7 s	219 km/h (136 mph)	21.1–17.9 kW⋅h/100 km (99–117 mpg‑e)
Macan 4 Electric	2024–present	Two (front & rear)	285–300 kW (387–408 PS; 382–402 hp)	650 N⋅m (479 lbf⋅ft)	2,330 kg (5,137 lb)	5.2 s	220 km/h (137 mph)	21.1–17.9 kW⋅h/100 km (99–117 mpg‑e)
Macan 4S Electric	2024–present	Two (front & rear)	330–379 kW (449–515 PS; 443–508 hp)	820 N⋅m (605 lbf⋅ft)	2,330 kg (5,137 lb)	4.1 s	220 km/h (137 mph)	21.1–17.9 kW⋅h/100 km (99–117 mpg‑e)
Macan Turbo Electric	2024–present	Two (front & rear)	430–470 kW (585–639 PS; 577–630 hp)	1,130 N⋅m (833 lbf⋅ft)	2,405 kg (5,302 lb)	3.3 s	260 km/h (162 mph)	20.7–18.8 kW⋅h/100 km (101–111 mpg‑e)

=== Safety ===
Euro NCAP test results Porsche Macan 4 Electric (LHD) (2024)
Test	Points	%
Overall:	5 /5 stars	
Adult occupant:	36.1	90%
Child occupant:	44.2	90%
Pedestrian:	52.3	83%
Safety assist:	14.1	78%

== Sales ==
Year	Europe	U.S.	Australia	China		Global	
Year	Europe	U.S.	Australia	Macan	EV		
2013	134					—	
2014	14,569	7,241	800			—	
2015	23,317	13,533	2,004			—	80,000+
2016	24,904	19,332	2,172			—	
2017	26,555	21,429	2,478			—	
2018	19,321	23,504	1,874			—	86,031
2019	24,469	22,667	2,009			—	99,944
2020	16,865	18,631	2,158			—	N/A
2021	15,757	24,716	2,328			—	88,362
2022		23,688	2,737			—	86,724
2023		26,947	2,925	17,577		—	
2024			3,323	9,627	157	—	
2025			2,194	5,319	1,313	—	
2026			389				

== Awards and recognition ==
- South African Car of the Year 2015
- Carsales Best Luxury SUV 2015
- Car and Driver Magazine 10Best for 2017-2021
- Car and Driver Magazine 10Best for 2023-2026
- Best EV in MotorWeek's Drivers' Choice Awards 2025
