= Michael Mauer =

German automobile designer

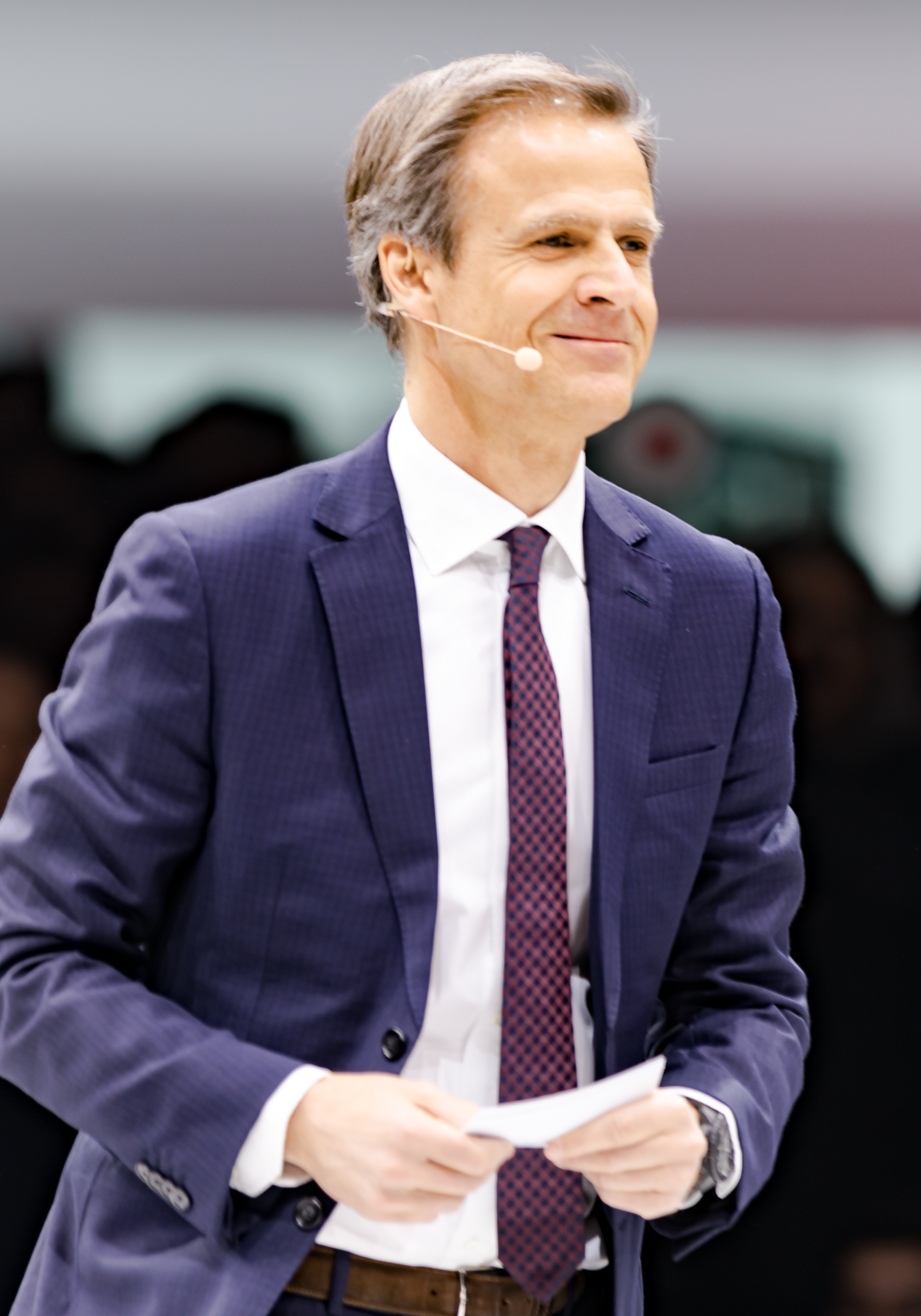
- Michael Mauer at the 2018 Geneva International Motor Show
- Born: 28 July 1962 (age 63); Rotenburg an der Fulda, West Germany
- Occupation: Car Designer
- Known for: Mercedes-Benz SLK; Porsche 991; Porsche 918 Spyder; Porsche Taycan
- Children: Samual Mauer and Amanda Mauer

Michael Mauer (born 28 July 1962) is a German automobile designer. He is the chief designer at Porsche. He has previously worked for Mercedes-Benz and Saab.

== Career ==
Mauer studied design from 1982 to 1986 at the Hochschule Pforzheim. His first job after graduating was with Mercedes-Benz in Sindelfingen. In 1989 he was appointed Design Project Leader for the Mercedes-Benz V-Class. In 1995 he was promoted to Head of Department and took responsibility for the new A-Class, SLK and SL models. In 1998 Mauer moved to the Tokyo design studio as general manager. A year later, he moved back to Europe and was in charge of design at Smart.

In June 2000 he left Mercedes to join General Motors and worked for Saab as Executive Director Design. In 2003 he became responsible for Advanced Design at General Motors Europe.

Mauer joined Porsche in 2004, taking over from Harm Lagaay, and is responsible for the Cayenne, Macan, Panamera, Porsche 911 (991), Porsche 911 (992) and Porsche 918 Spyder. The 2012 911 won the Red Dot award.
