= Porsche India =

Division of Porsche and Volkswagen Group India

- Type: Division of Porsche & Volkswagen Group India
- Industry: Automotive
- Founded: 2012; 14 years ago
- Headquarters: Mumbai, Maharashtra, India
- Key people: Manolito Vujicic (Brand Director)
- Products: Luxury vehicles
- Parent: Porsche
- Website: www.porsche.in

Porsche India Pvt Ltd is a division of the German automobile manufacturer Porsche and the Volkswagen Group India. Founded in 2004, with headquarters in Mumbai.

Porsche India currently imports and sells the Boxster, Cayman, 911, Panamera, Macan and Cayenne.

== History & sales ==
Porsche has been selling luxury cars in India since 2004, delivering a total of 1,052 units to the customers in India, out of which 85 percent are Cayenne SUV models. In order to become the leading automobile luxury brand in the Indian automotive market, Porsche had established Porsche India as its division. As in January 2013, the company planned to extend its sale in India by establishing new centres in India.

== Models ==
=== Sports Cars ===
- 911

=== Saloon ===
- Taycan
- Panamera

=== SUV ===
- Macan
- Cayenne

== Porsche Centres ==
- Ahmedabad
- Bangalore
- Chandigarh
- Chennai
- Delhi
- Kochi
- Kolkata
- Mumbai

== Volkswagen Group as an importer ==
As the company received positive response from customers in the Porsche India range, Porsche has appointed its parent company Volkswagen Group, as the official importer of its cars in India.

== See also ==
- Audi India
- BMW India
- Mercedes-Benz India
- Lexus India
