= BMW India =

Indian operation of BMW

BMW India Pvt Ltd
- Type: Subsidiary
- Industry: Automotive
- Founded: 2006; 20 years ago
- Headquarters: Gurgaon, India
- Area served: India
- Key people: Hardeep Singh Brar (President and CEO)
- Products: Luxury vehicles Commercial vehicles Motorcycles
- Production output: ▲11,105 units (2018)
- Number of employees: 650
- Parent: BMW
- Subsidiaries: BMW Indian Financial Services Pvt. Ltd.; BMW Indian Leasing Pvt. Ltd.
- Website: bmw.in

BMW India is the Indian subsidiary of German car manufacturer BMW. It started operations in January 2007 with a wide range of its activities, including a manufacturing plant in Chennai, a parts warehouse in Mumbai, a training centre in Gurgaon NCR, and development of a dealer organisation across major metropolitan centres of the country.

== Locations ==
BMW Group Plant Chennai started operations on 29 March 2007. BMW Group Plant Chennai locally produces 12 car models – BMW 2 Series Gran Coupe, BMW 3 Series, BMW 3 Series Gran Turismo, BMW 5 Series, BMW 6 Series Gran Turismo, BMW 7 Series, BMW 8 Series, BMW X1, BMW X3, BMW X4, BMW X5, BMW X7 and MINI Countryman.

== Models ==
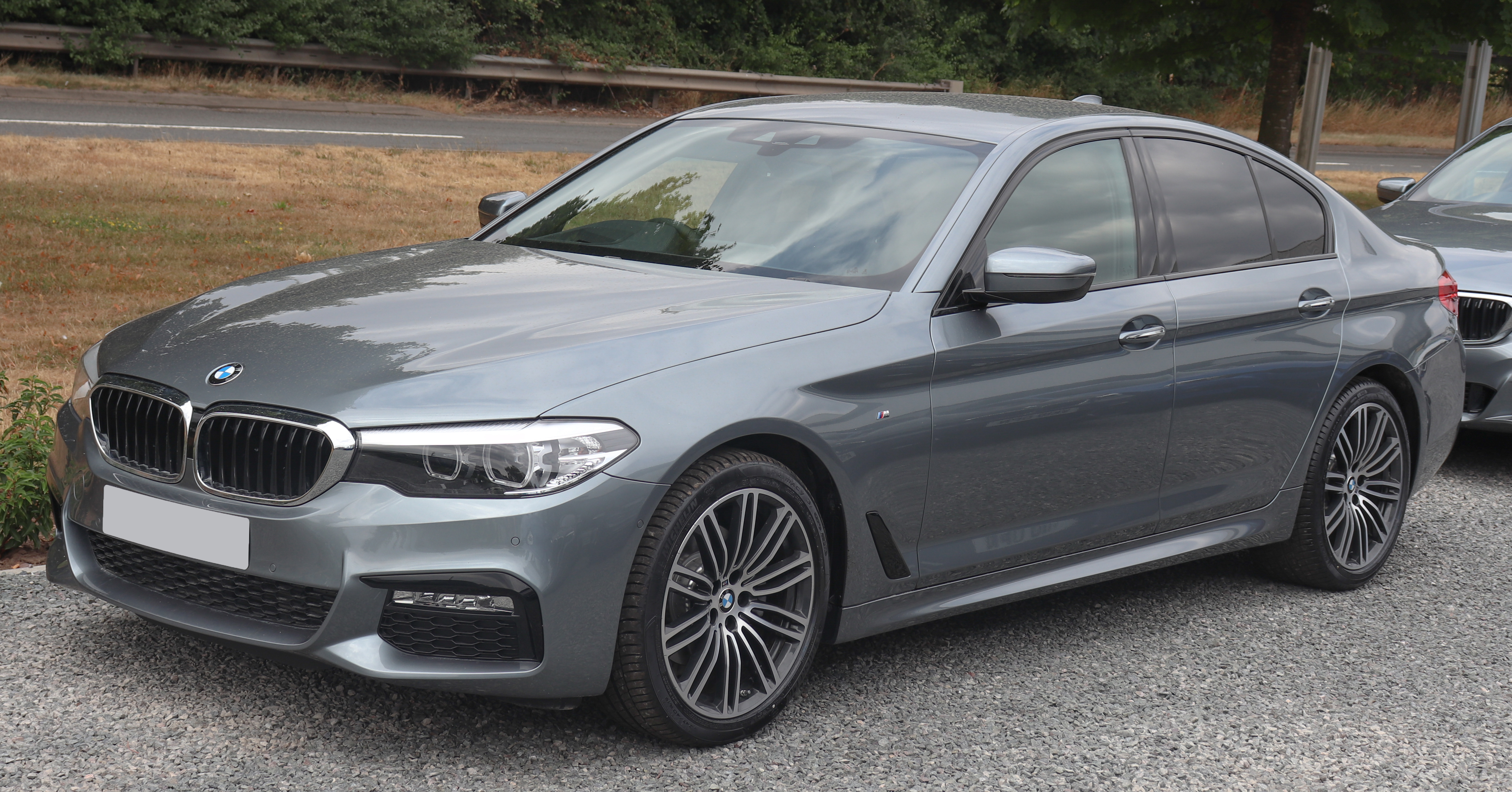
BMW 5 Series

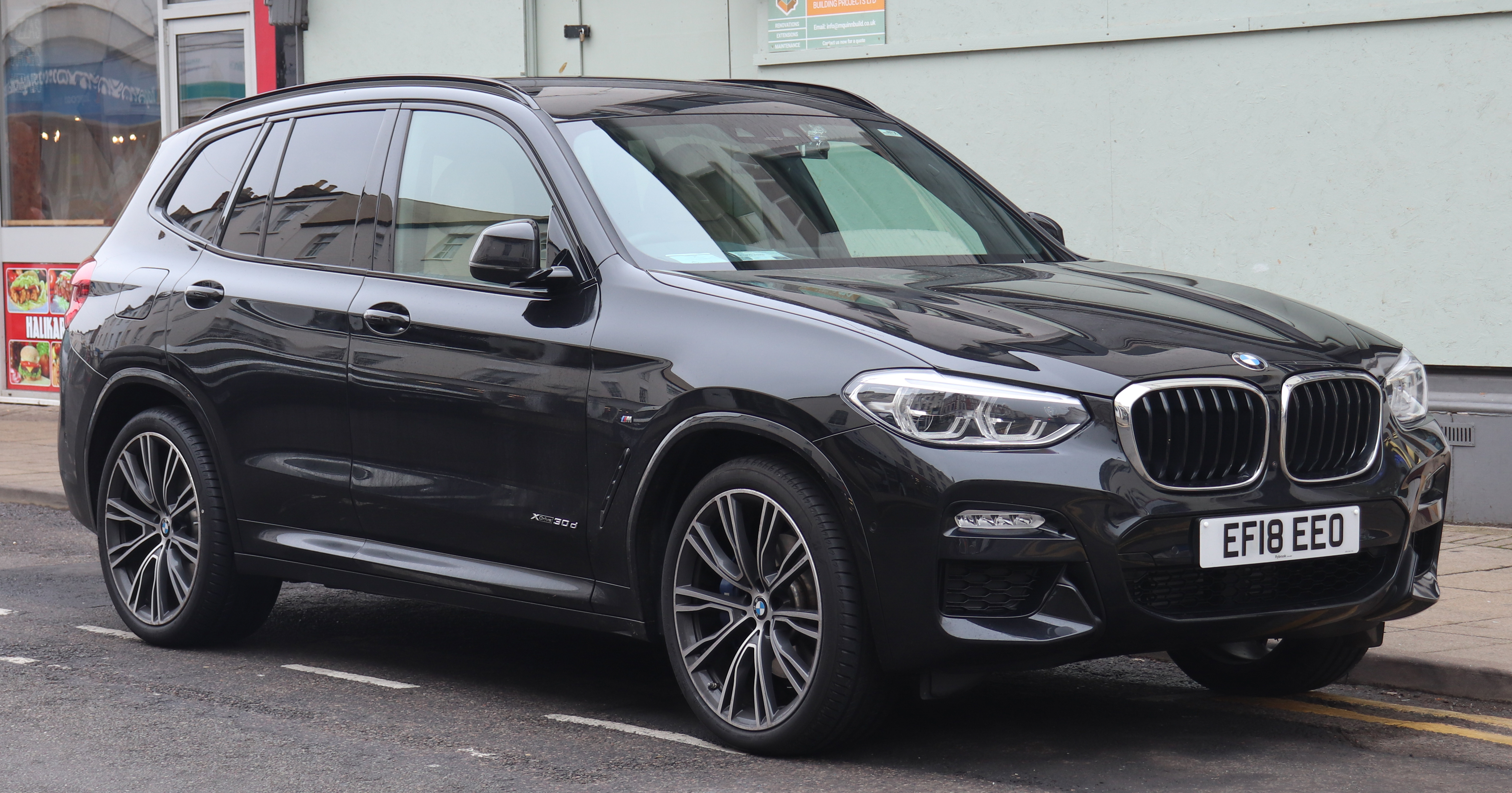
BMW X3

- BMW 2 Series Gran Coupé latest model launched July 2025
- BMW 3 Series (Sedan only)
- BMW 4 Series launched February 2022
- BMW 5 Series (Sedan only)
- BMW 6 Series latest model launched on April 1, 2023
- BMW 7 Series latest model launched on January 7, 2023
- BMW 8 Series launched November 2020
- BMW X1 latest model launched on Jan 28, 2023
- BMW X3 latest model launched January 2025
- BMW X5 launched May 2019
- BMW X6 launched June 2020
- BMW X7 launched July 2019
- BMW XM launched December 2022
- BMW Z4 launched April 2019
- BMW iX1 launched September 2023
- BMW iX launched December 2021
- BMW i5 launched April 2024
- BMW i7 launched January 2023

== Sales performance ==
=== Number of units sold by year ===
Year	2012	2013	2014	2015	2016	2017	2018	2019	2020	2012–2020
Units sold	9,375 (including Mini)	7,327 (including Mini)	10,851	11,192(including Mini (340 MINI))	7,861	9,800	11,105 (including mini-700)	9,641 (including mini-641)	6,604 (including Mini- 512)	90,894

== MINI India ==
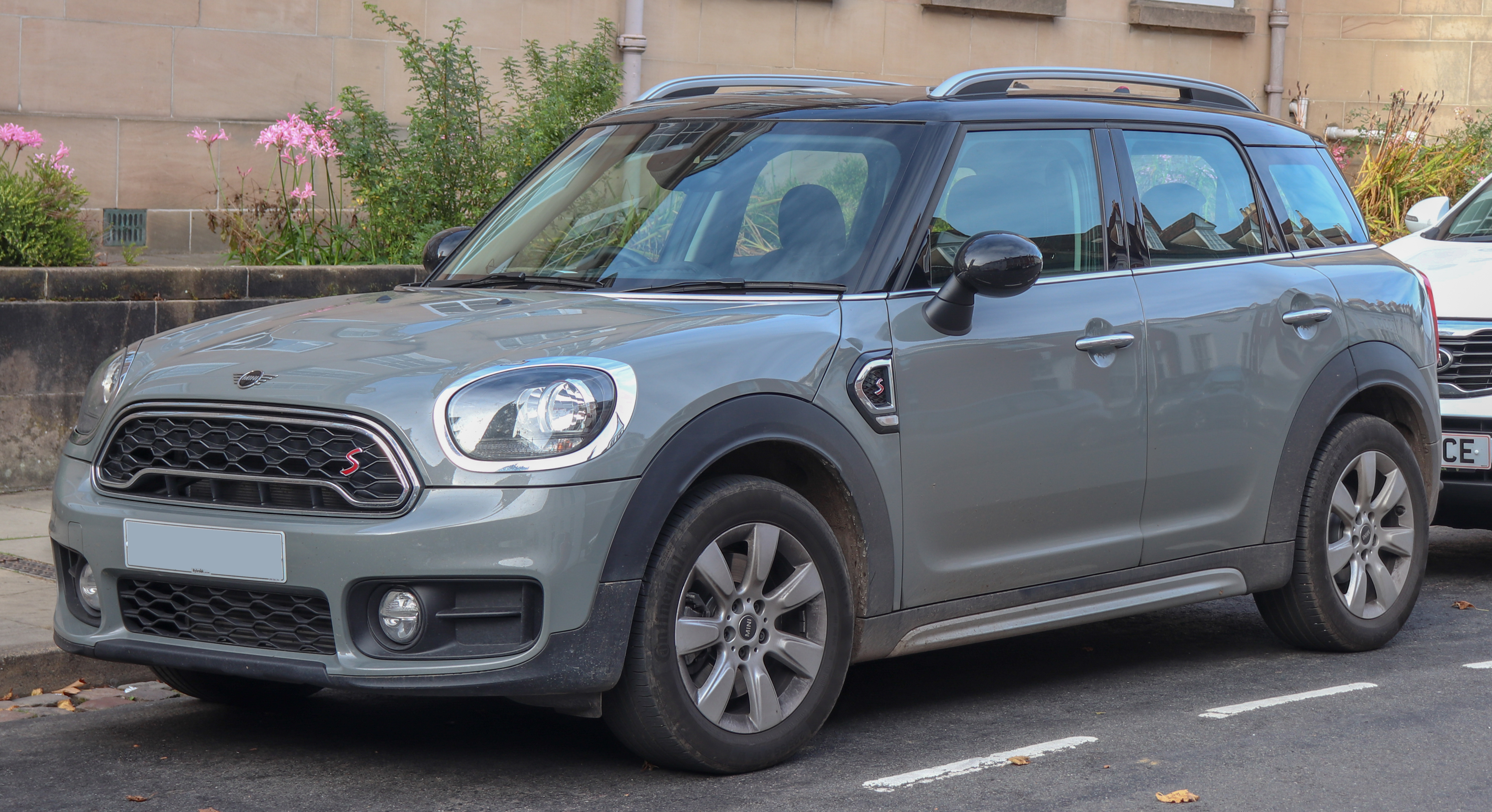
Mini Countryman

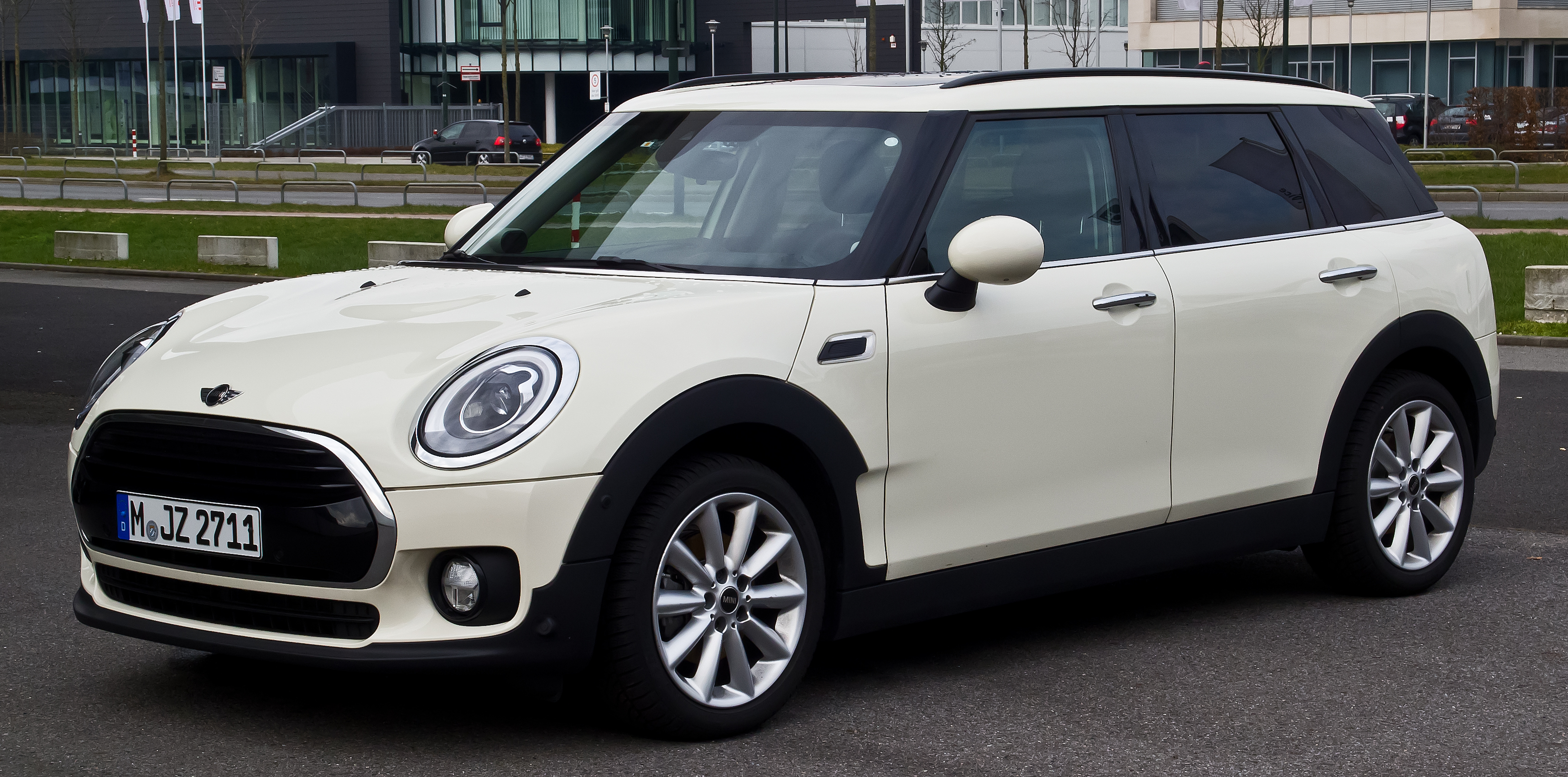
Mini Clubman

MINI has successfully established itself as a premium small car brand in India since its launch in January 2012. Presently, the MINI model range in India includes the MINI Cooper and the MINI Countryman Electric. Till date, MINI has established 10 sales outlets in India.

- MINI Cooper
- MINI Countryman Electric

== Dealer/service network ==
States and cities in India with one or more BMW dealership (number of dealerships):

State	City	Number of dealerships
Andhra Pradesh	Vijayawada	1
Chandigarh	Chandigarh	1
Chhattisgarh	Raipur	1
Delhi	South-East Delhi	1
Goa	Verna	1
Gujarat	Ahmedabad	1
Gujarat	Surat	1
Haryana	Faridabad	1
Haryana	Guragaon	2
Jharkhand	Ranchi	1
Karnataka	Bangalore	2
Karnataka	Mangalore	1
Kerala	Kochi	1
Kerala	Kozhikode	1
Kerala	Trivandrum	1
Madhya Pradesh	Indore	1
Maharashtra	Mumbai	1
Maharashtra	Pune	1
Maharashtra	Nagpur	1
Maharashtra	Aurangabad	1
Odisha	Bhubaneswar	1
Punjab	Ludhiana	1
Rajasthan	Jaipur	1
Rajasthan	Udaipur	1
Tamil Nadu	Chennai	4
Tamil Nadu	Coimbatore	1
Tamil Nadu	Madurai	1
Telangana	Hyderabad	1
Uttar Pradesh	Kanpur	1
Uttar Pradesh	Noida	1
Uttar Pradesh	Lucknow	1
West Bengal	Kolkata	1

== See also ==
- Audi India
- Porsche India
- Mercedes-Benz India
- Lexus India
