= Porsche Panamera =

Luxury car

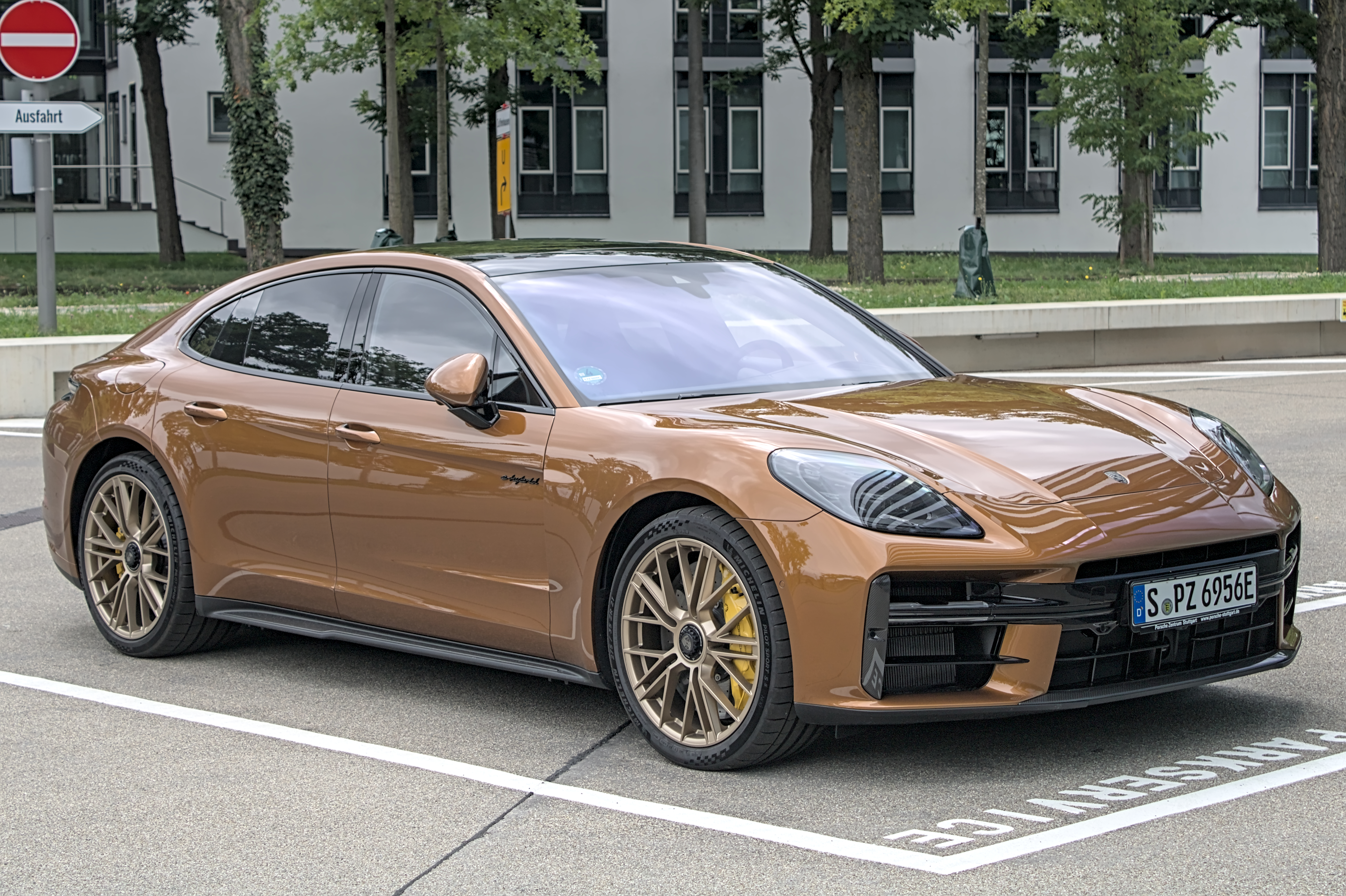
- 2024 Porsche Panamera Turbo E-Hybrid (976)

Overview
- Manufacturer: Porsche AG
- Production: 2009–present
- Assembly: Germany: Leipzig

Body and chassis
- Class: Executive car (E); Full-size luxury car (F) (LWB)
- Layout: Front-engine, rear-wheel-drive / four-wheel-drive

Chronology
- Predecessor: Porsche 989 (concept)

The Porsche Panamera is a mid- to full-sized luxury car (E-segment or F-segment for LWB in Europe) manufactured and marketed by German automobile manufacturer Porsche. It currently spans across three generations, using a front-engine and rear- or all-wheel drive configuration.

The Panamera debuted at the 13th Auto Shanghai International Automobile Show in April 2009, later launching hybrid and diesel versions in 2011. In April 2013, the company introduced a facelifted model, again at the Shanghai Auto Show, followed by the US introduction of a plug-in hybrid version, the Panamera S E-Hybrid, in November 2013. Porsche launched the second-generation Panamera in 2016, and in November 2023, the third generation was introduced.

The Panamera name, as with the Carrera name, is derived from the Carrera Panamericana race.

== Concept ==
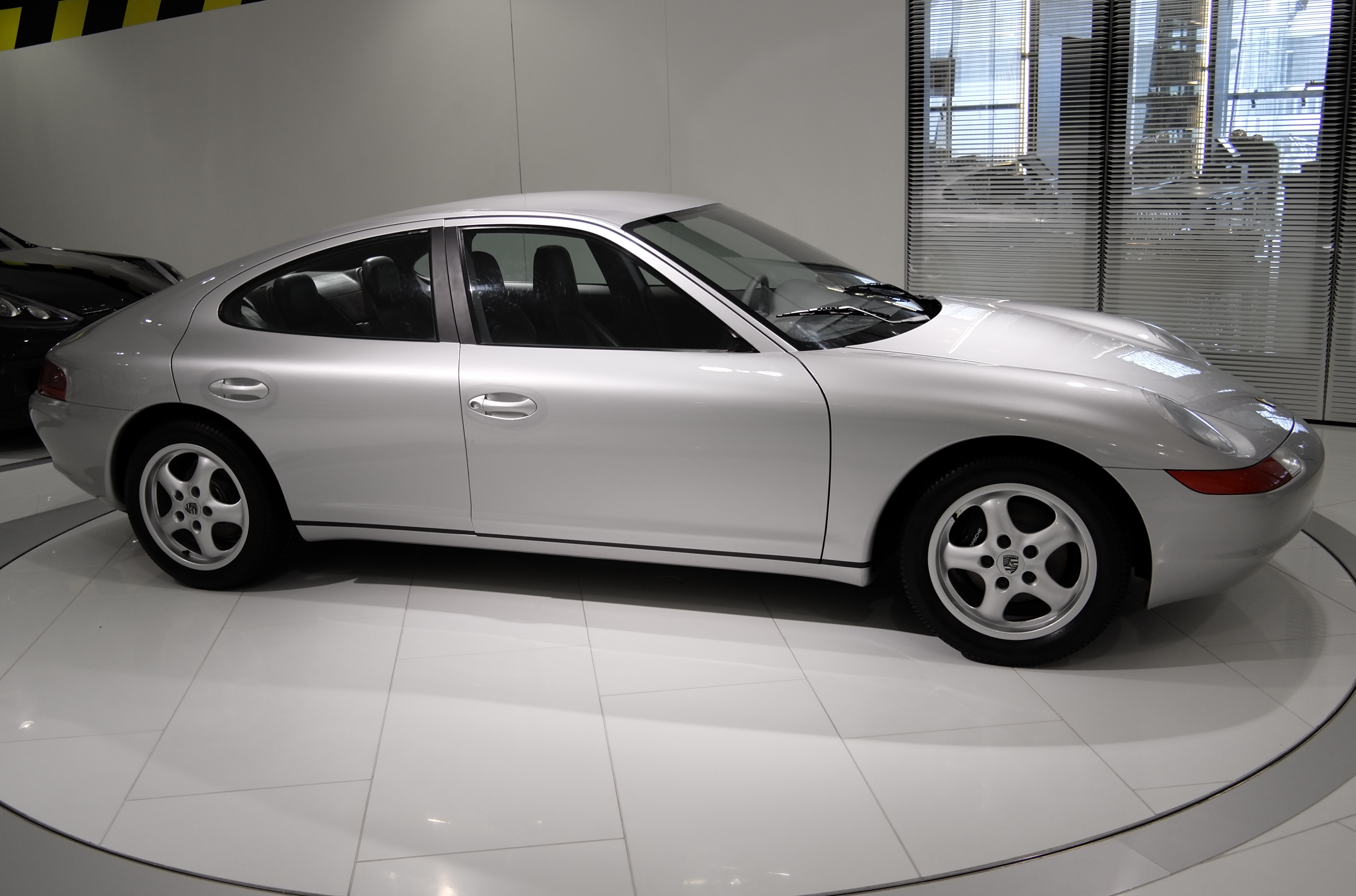
The Porsche 989 concept at the Porsche museum in Stuttgart, Germany

As a front-engine, full-sized, four-passenger, four-door luxury hatchback weighing nearly 4,000 pounds (1,800 kg), the Panamera runs contrary to the company's historically lightweight two-door, rear-engine sports cars, notably the 911. Though the Panamera's shape and profile resemble the 911, where the 911 has a tight, performance-focused interior, the Panamera features commodious dimensions with technological, luxury-oriented amenities.

== Production ==
Logo.

Engines are first assembled in Stuttgart, and the car's body is built, painted, and assembled in Leipzig, Germany, alongside the Cayenne (until 2017) and Macan. From 2009 to 2016, the bodies were built at the Volkswagen Group facility in Hannover.

Production began in April 2009, the same month it debuted at the Shanghai motor show in China.

== First generation (970 Chassis G1; 2009) ==
First generation (970) Chassis G1
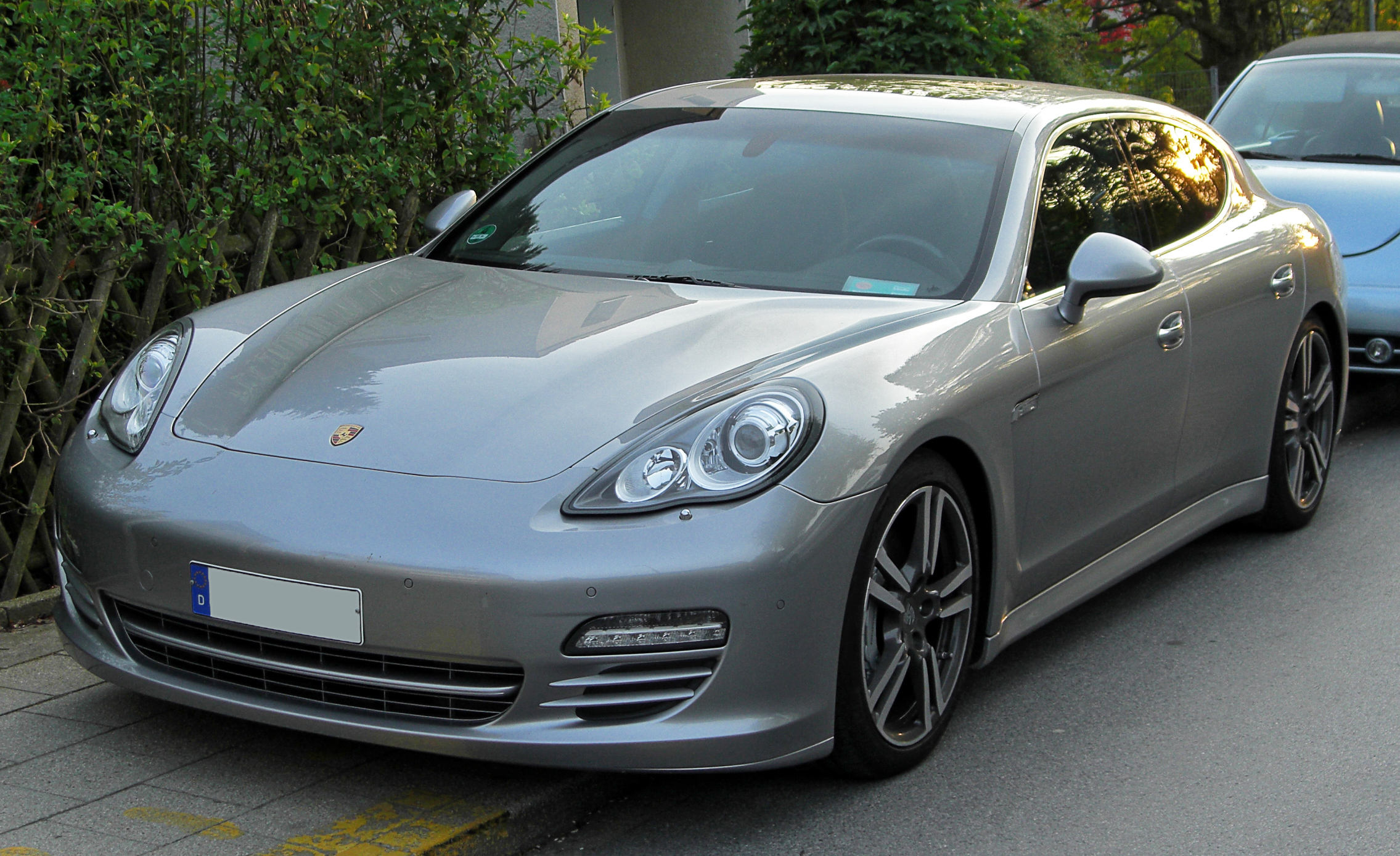
- Porsche Panamera 4S (pre-facelift)

Overview
- Production: April 2009–2016
- Designer: Michael Mauer

Body and chassis
- Body style: five-door liftback/fastback sedan
- Platform: Porsche G1

Powertrain
- Engine: 3.0 L V6 turbodiesel; 3.6 L V6; 3.0 L supercharged V6 EA837 (Hybrid); 4.8 L V8 M48.20; 4.8 L twin-turbocharged V8 M48.70
- Electric motor: 47 hp (35 kW; 48 PS) AC Brushless electric motor (Panamera S Hybrid); 95 hp (71 kW; 96 PS) AC induction electric motor (Panamera S E-Hybrid)
- Transmission: 6-speed manual; 7-speed ZF 7DT PDK; 8-speed ZF 8HP automatic (Tiptronic S) (Hybrid models only); 8-Speed TL-80SN/TR-82SD automatic (13-17 Diesel models only)
- Hybrid drivetrain: FHEV (Panamera S Hybrid); PHEV (Panamera S E-Hybrid)
- Battery: 1.7 kWh NiMH (Panamera S Hybrid); 9.4 kWh li-ion (Panamera S E-Hybrid)

Dimensions
- Wheelbase: 2,920 mm (115.0 in); 3,070 mm (120.9 in) (LWB; 2013–2016)
- Length: 4,970 mm (195.7 in); 5,120 mm (201.6 in) (LWB; 2013–2016)
- Width: 1,931 mm (76.0 in)
- Height: 1,418 mm (55.8 in); 1,425 mm (56.1 in) (LWB; 2013–2016)
- Curb weight: 1,770–2,055 kg (3,902–4,530 lb)

Panamera (970)

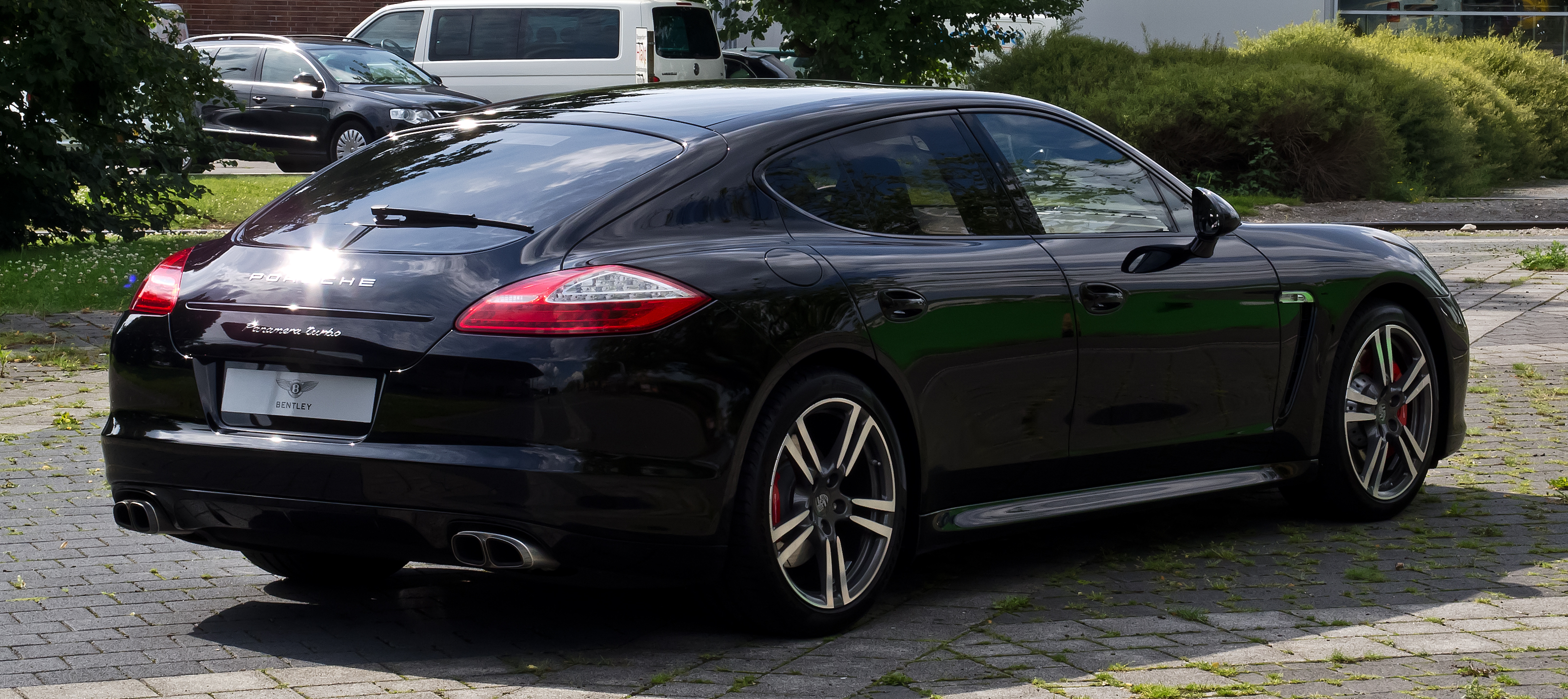
Panamera Turbo rear (pre-facelift)

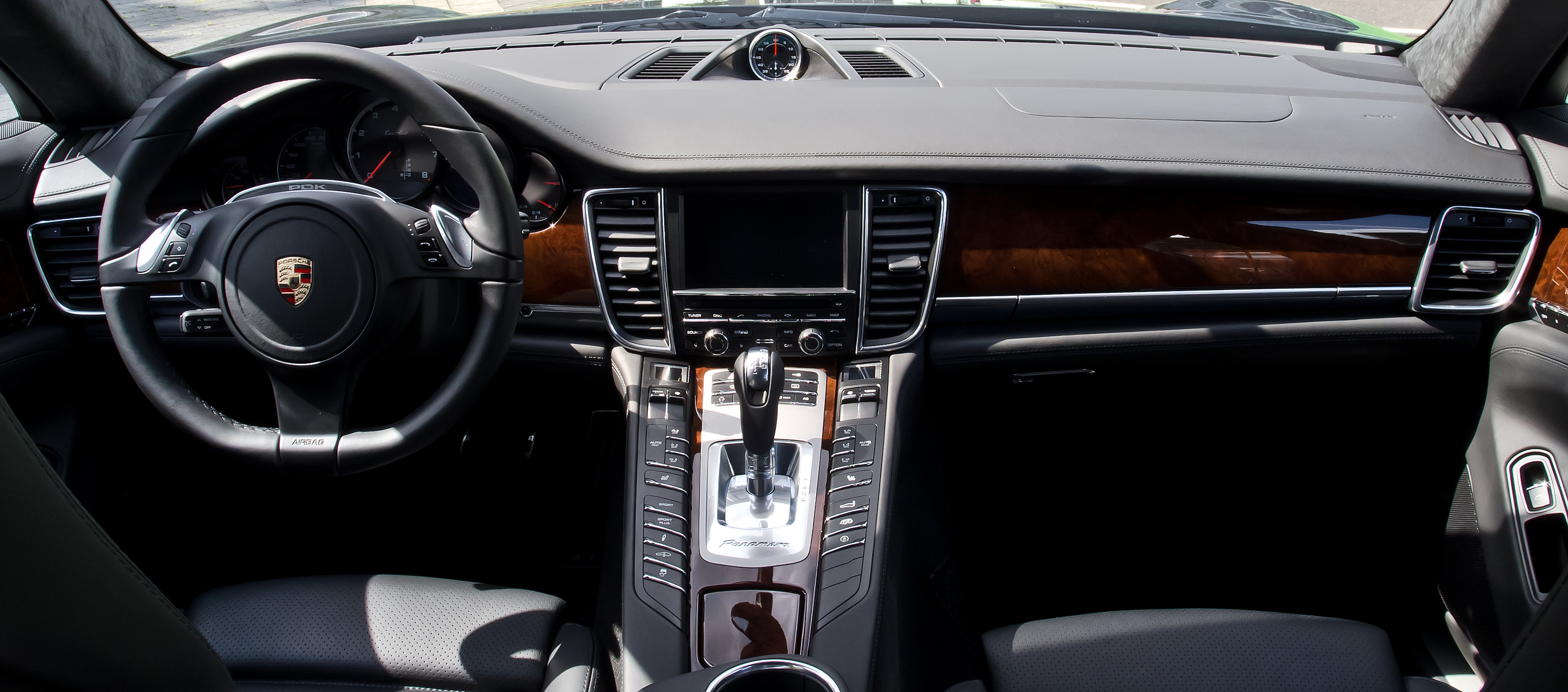
Interior

The V8-powered Panamera S, 4S, and Turbo models were the first versions that debuted in 2009. In addition to the 4.8L Twin Turbo 500 PS (368 kW; 493 hp) V8 powered models, Porsche launched two further models in 2010: the Panamera and Panamera 4 which are both powered by 3.6-litre V6 engines producing 300 PS (221 kW; 296 hp).

Being derived from the V8 engine of the Panamera S and Panamera 4S, the V6 retains the V8's technologies like Direct Fuel Injection, infinitely variable intake camshaft adjustment with variable valve lift (VarioCam Plus), an on-demand oil pump, water cooling with thermal management, a variable intake manifold, as well as integrated dry sump lubrication with two-stage extraction of oil, and an Auto Start-Stop function (only with the PDK transmission). Turbo version uses active aerodynamics with a multi-stage, adjustable rear spoiler. Optional Sports Chrono Packages include a Sport Plus button, which has tighter damping and air springs, and lowers the car's body by 25 mm (1.0 in).

In 2011, the Panamera S Hybrid, Diesel, Turbo S, and GTS variants were added to the range. The GTS achieves a lateral acceleration of 0.96g.

The Panamera, S, Hybrid and Diesel models are rear-wheel drive, while the Panamera 4, 4S, and GTS have the same four-wheel drive system as the Turbo and Turbo S, called Porsche Traction Management (PTM).

The Panamera featured Adaptive air suspension, the Porsche Dynamic Chassis Control (PDCC), active anti-roll bars and the Porsche Active Suspension Management (PASM).

=== Engines ===
| Car model | | Displacement & configuration | Max. motive power at rpm | Max. torque at rpm | Max. speed | Emissions CO_{2} |
|---|---|---|---|---|---|---|
| Panamera | | 3.6 litre V6 | 300 PS (221 kW; 296 hp) at 6,200 | 400 N⋅m (295 lbf⋅ft) at 3,750–4,250 | 261 km/h (162 mph) | 265 g/km (manual) |
| Panamera 4 | | 3.6 litre V6 | 300 PS (221 kW; 296 hp) at 6,200 | 400 N⋅m (295 lbf⋅ft) at 3,750–4,250 | 257 km/h (160 mph) | 225 g/km |
| Panamera Diesel | | 3.0 litre V6 turbodiesel | 250 PS (184 kW; 247 hp) at 3,800 | 550 N⋅m (406 lbf⋅ft) at 1,750–2,750 | 244 km/h (152 mph) | 172 g/km |
| Panamera S Hybrid | Gasoline engine | 3.0 litre V6 supercharged (EA837) + Electric Motor | 333 PS (245 kW; 328 hp) at 5,500–6,500 | 441 N⋅m (325 lbf⋅ft) at 3,000–5,200 | 270 km/h (168 mph) | 167 g/km |
| Panamera S Hybrid | Electric motor | 3.0 litre V6 supercharged (EA837) + Electric Motor | 48 PS (35 kW; 47 hp) at 1,150 | 300 N⋅m (221 lbf⋅ft) | 270 km/h (168 mph) | 167 g/km |
| Panamera S Hybrid | Combined | 3.0 litre V6 supercharged (EA837) + Electric Motor | 380 PS (279 kW; 375 hp) at 5,500 | 580 N⋅m (428 lbf⋅ft) at 1,000 | 270 km/h (168 mph) | 167 g/km |
| Panamera S | | 4.8 litre M48 V8 | 400 PS (294 kW; 395 hp) at 6,500 | 500 N⋅m (369 lbf⋅ft) at 3,500–5,000 | 285 km/h (177 mph) | 293 g/km (manual) |
| Panamera 4S | | 4.8 litre M48 V8 | 400 PS (294 kW; 395 hp) at 6,500 | 500 N⋅m (369 lbf⋅ft) at 3,500–5,000 | 282 km/h (175 mph) | 254 g/km |
| Panamera GTS | | 4.8 litre M48 V8 | 430 PS (316 kW; 424 hp) at 6,700 | 520 N⋅m (384 lbf⋅ft) at 3,500–5,000 | 288 km/h (179 mph) | 256 g/km |
| Panamera Turbo | | 4.8 litre M48 V8 twin turbo | 500 PS (368 kW; 493 hp) at 6,000 | 700 N⋅m (516 lbf⋅ft) at 2,250–4,500 | 303 km/h (188 mph) | 270 g/km |
| Panamera Turbo S | | 4.8 litre M48 V8 twin turbo | 550 PS (405 kW; 542 hp) at 6,000 | 750 N⋅m (553 lbf⋅ft) at 2,250–4,500 | 306 km/h (190 mph) | 270 g/km |

=== Transmissions ===
The newly introduced 7-speed PDK dual clutch transmission was standard on the Panamera 4, 4S and Turbo models. The addition of the optional sport chrono package provided faster acceleration times. The Diesel and Hybrid models had a ZF 8-speed automatic transmission called the Tiptronic S which was shared with the Cayenne. In some markets between 2009 and 2013 Porsche offered a 6-speed manual transmission for the V6 N/A and V8 N/A, all with rear wheel drive. Global production with the 6-speed manual was only 50 with V6 and 96 with V8.

=== Panamera Turbo S ===
The engine of the Panamera Turbo S features larger turbochargers than the standard Panamera Turbo's 4.8-litre V8, as well as high-pressure fuel injection, and aluminium-alloy pistons. The piston rings are coated in a low-friction surface to further increase performance. The Panamera Turbo S accelerates to 62 mph (100 km/h) in 3.8 seconds with launch control engaged. Roll-on acceleration should be quicker, changes to the PDK (Porsche Doppelkupplung) gearbox allow for faster gearshifts, and the alleged 27.7mpg fuel economy is no worse than the less powerful Panamera Turbo.

- Drag coefficient: 0.30
- 0–60 mph (0–97 km/h): 3.3 seconds
- 0–100 mph (0–161 km/h): 7.2 seconds
- 1/4 mile: 11.5 seconds at 116 mph (187 km/h)
- Braking 70 mph (110 km/h) to 0 mph (0 km/h): 135 feet (41 m)

=== Panamera S Hybrid ===
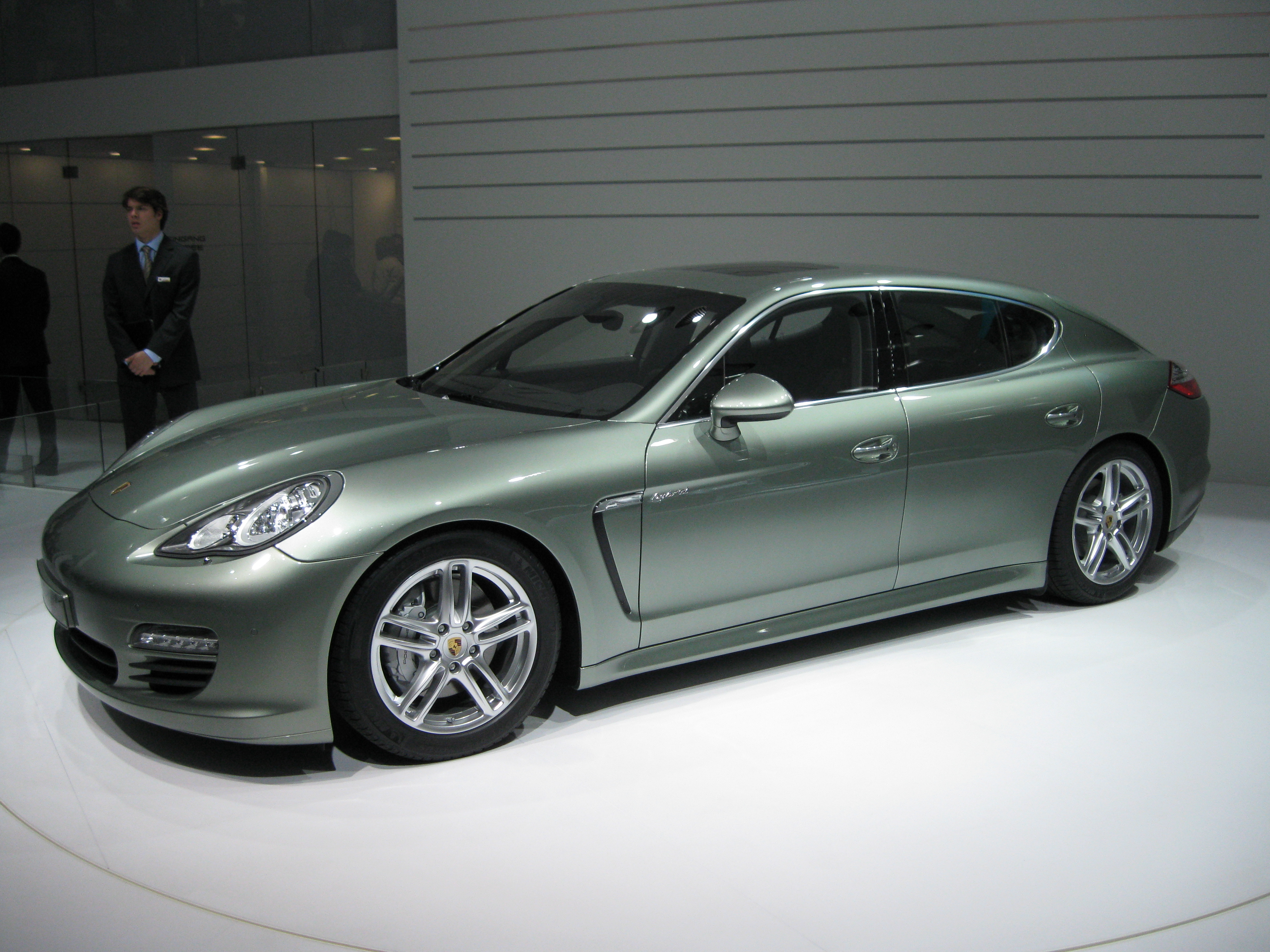
Porsche Panamera S Hybrid at the 2011 Geneva Motor Show

In 2008, Porsche AG announced the development of a parallel hybrid system for the Panamera, and in February 2011, Porsche unveiled the Panamera S Hybrid. Using the same drivetrain seen in the Cayenne S Hybrid—an Audi-sourced supercharged 3.0-litre V6 engine producing 333 PS (245 kW; 328 hp) along with an electric motor rated at 47 PS (35 kW; 46 hp), as well as the Cayenne's 8-speed Tiptronic S transmission—the 380 PS (279 kW; 375 hp) Panamera S Hybrid could accelerate from 0–62 mph (100 km/h) in 6.0 seconds. The Panamera S Hybrid produced only 193 grams of carbon dioxide per kilometre, rendering it the most environment friendly car in the then entire Porsche model range, while still maintaining a top speed of 167.8 mph (270 km/h).

Deliveries began in the United States in 2011, and cumulative sales reached 684 units through March 2013. The U.S. Environmental Protection Agency (EPA) rated the fuel economy for the 2013/2012 model year Panamera Hybrid at 22 mpg_{‑US} (11 L/100 km; 26 mpg_{‑imp}) for city driving, 30 mpg_{‑US} (7.8 L/100 km; 36 mpg_{‑imp}) for highway, and 25 mpg_{‑US} (9.4 L/100 km; 30 mpg_{‑imp}) combined.

=== Panamera Diesel ===
The Panamera Diesel was launched in May 2011. The vehicle utilized the same Audi 3.0L V6 engine used in the Cayenne Diesel, which was itself a tuned carryover of an existing engine. The engine had a power output of 250 PS (184 kW; 247 hp). The car was capable of accelerating from 0–62 mph (100 km/h) in 6.8 seconds and had a top speed of 150.4 mph (242 km/h). It was also the most economical Porsche in the then entire Porsche vehicle lineage, consuming 6.3 litres per 100 kilometres (37 US MPG/45 UK MPG).

=== Special editions ===
In October 2012, Porsche introduced the Panamera Platinum Edition. The exterior of the Panamera Platinum Edition was enveloped in one of five basic colours – black, white, basalt black, carbon grey metallic, and mahogany metallic. It included more standard equipment, larger wheels, and an exclusive interior leather combination of luxor beige and black. It was offered with rear and all wheel drive layouts, and had a 0 to 60 mph (0 to 97 km/h) acceleration time of under 5.8 seconds or faster on all variants. Exclusive equipment included the special interior combination, platinum rear overhang and front lower grille, platinum door sills, and platinum mirrors. The finalizing touch to this special edition included an exclusive set of 19-inch Panamera Turbo alloy wheels with the red, black, and gold Porsche crest.

In March 2015, Porsche announced that they were releasing a new special edition Panamera called the "Panamera Edition". The car is based on the base Panamera and includes high-gloss black trim strips outline the windows, 19-inch Panamera Turbo wheels with coloured centre caps, the sills were inscribed with the word "Edition," and body-coloured door handles were an additional add on when the customer chose the Porsche Entry & Drive option. The Panamera Edition cost US$80,000.

=== 2013 facelift (970.2) ===
Panamera 970 (2013 facelift)

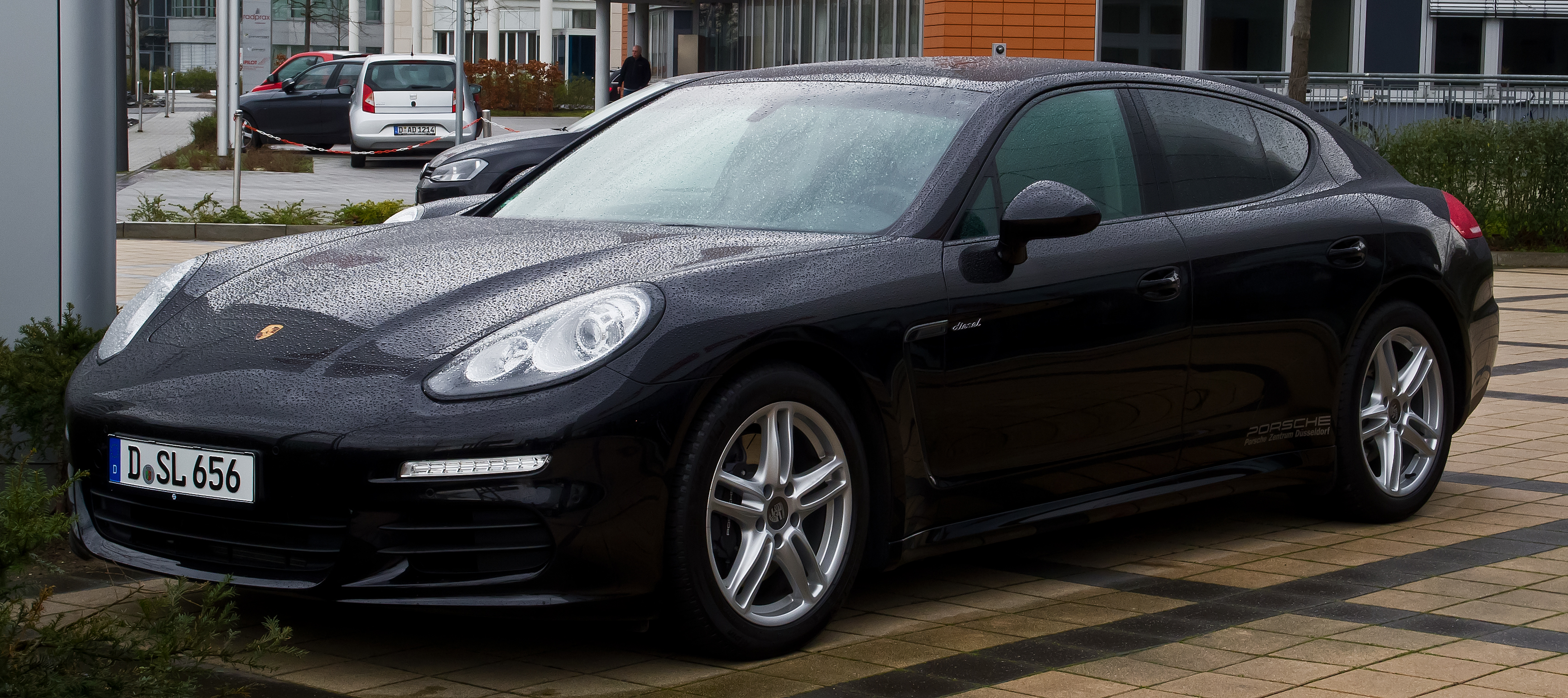
Front

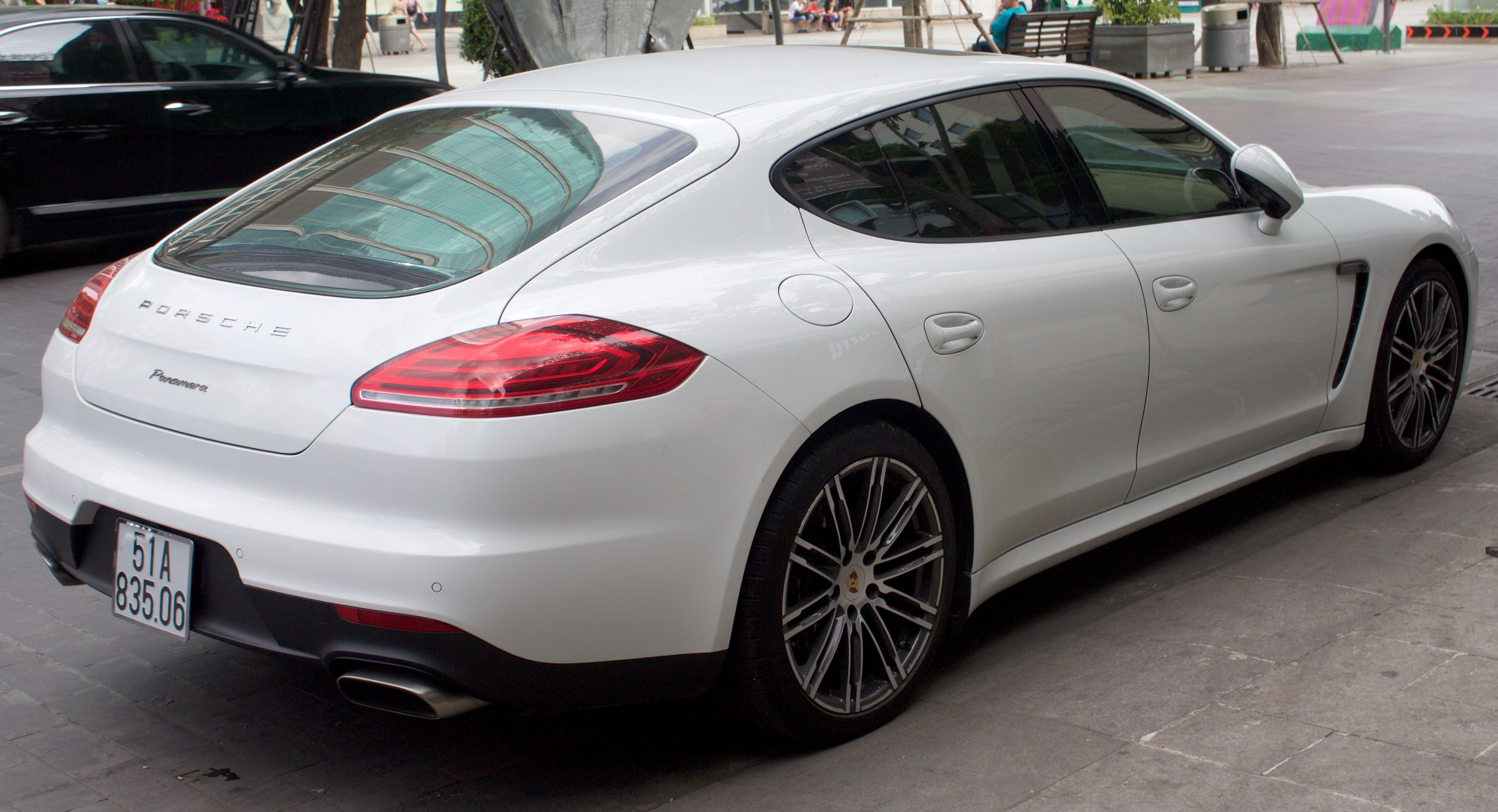
Rear

Porsche announced its updated Panamera on 3 April 2013, with a scheduled formal launch at Auto Shanghai. The revised model can be identified by new front and rear bumpers. Technical changes included the addition of a new 3.0L twin-turbocharged Panamera S and a new E-Hybrid model. A long wheelbase version with an additional 150 mm was available for selected left-hand drive markets. The Turbo S version followed up in 2014. The long wheelbase versions were only available on 4S, Turbo, and Turbo S models.

==== Engines ====
| car model | | displacement & configuration | max. motive power at rpm | max. torque at rpm | max. speed | emissions CO_{2} |
|---|---|---|---|---|---|---|
| Panamera | | 3.6 litres (3,605 cc) V6 | 310 PS (228 kW; 306 bhp) at 6,200 | 400 N⋅m (295 lbf⋅ft) at 3,750 | 259 km/h (161 mph) | 196 g/km |
| Panamera 4 | | 3.6 litres (3,605 cc) V6 | 310 PS (228 kW; 306 bhp) at 6,200 | 400 N⋅m (295 lbf⋅ft) at 3,750 | 257 km/h (160 mph) | 203 g/km |
| Panamera Diesel | | 3.0 litres (2,967 cc) V6 turbodiesel | 300 PS (221 kW; 296 bhp) at 3,800–4,400 | 650 N⋅m (479 lbf⋅ft) at 1,750–2,750 | 259 km/h (161 mph) | 166 g/km |
| Panamera S | | 3.0 litres (2,997 cc) V6 twin turbo | 420 PS (309 kW; 414 bhp) at 6,000 | 520 N⋅m (384 lbf⋅ft) at 1,750–5,000 | 287 km/h (178 mph) | 204 g/km |
| Panamera 4S | | 3.0 litres (2,997 cc) V6 twin turbo | 420 PS (309 kW; 414 bhp) at 6,000 | 520 N⋅m (384 lbf⋅ft) at 1,750–5,000 | 286 km/h (178 mph) | 208 g/km |
| Panamera S E-Hybrid | Gasoline engine | 3.0 litres (2,995 cc) V6 supercharged + Electric Motor | 333 PS (245 kW; 328 hp) at 5,500 | 441 N⋅m (325 lbf⋅ft) at 3,000–5,250 | 270 km/h (168 mph) | 71 g/km |
| Panamera S E-Hybrid | Electric motor | 3.0 litres (2,995 cc) V6 supercharged + Electric Motor | 96 PS (71 kW; 95 hp) | 310 N⋅m (229 lbf⋅ft) | 270 km/h (168 mph) | 71 g/km |
| Panamera S E-Hybrid | Combined | 3.0 litres (2,995 cc) V6 supercharged + Electric Motor | 422 PS (310 kW; 416 bhp) at 5,500 | 590 N⋅m (435 lbf⋅ft) at 1,250–4,000 | 270 km/h (168 mph) | 71 g/km |
| Panamera GTS | | 4.8 litres (4,806 cc) M48 V8 | 440 PS (324 kW; 434 bhp) at 6,700 | 520 N⋅m (384 lbf⋅ft) at 3,500 | 288 km/h (179 mph) | 249 g/km |
| Panamera Turbo | | 4.8 litres (4,806 cc) V8 twin turbo | 520 PS (382 kW; 513 bhp) at 6,000 | 700 N⋅m (516 lbf⋅ft) at 2,250–4,500 | 305 km/h (190 mph) | 239 g/km |
| Panamera Turbo S | | 4.8 litres (4,806 cc) V8 twin turbo | 570 PS (419 kW; 562 bhp) at 6,000 | 750 N⋅m (553 lbf⋅ft) at 2,250–4,500 | 309 km/h (192 mph) | 239 g/km |
| Panamera Turbo S Executive | | 4.8 litres (4,806 cc) V8 twin turbo | 570 PS (419 kW; 562 bhp) at 6,000 | 800 N⋅m (590 lbf⋅ft) at 2,250–4,500 | 310 km/h (193 mph) | 242 g/km |

==== Panamera S E-Hybrid ====
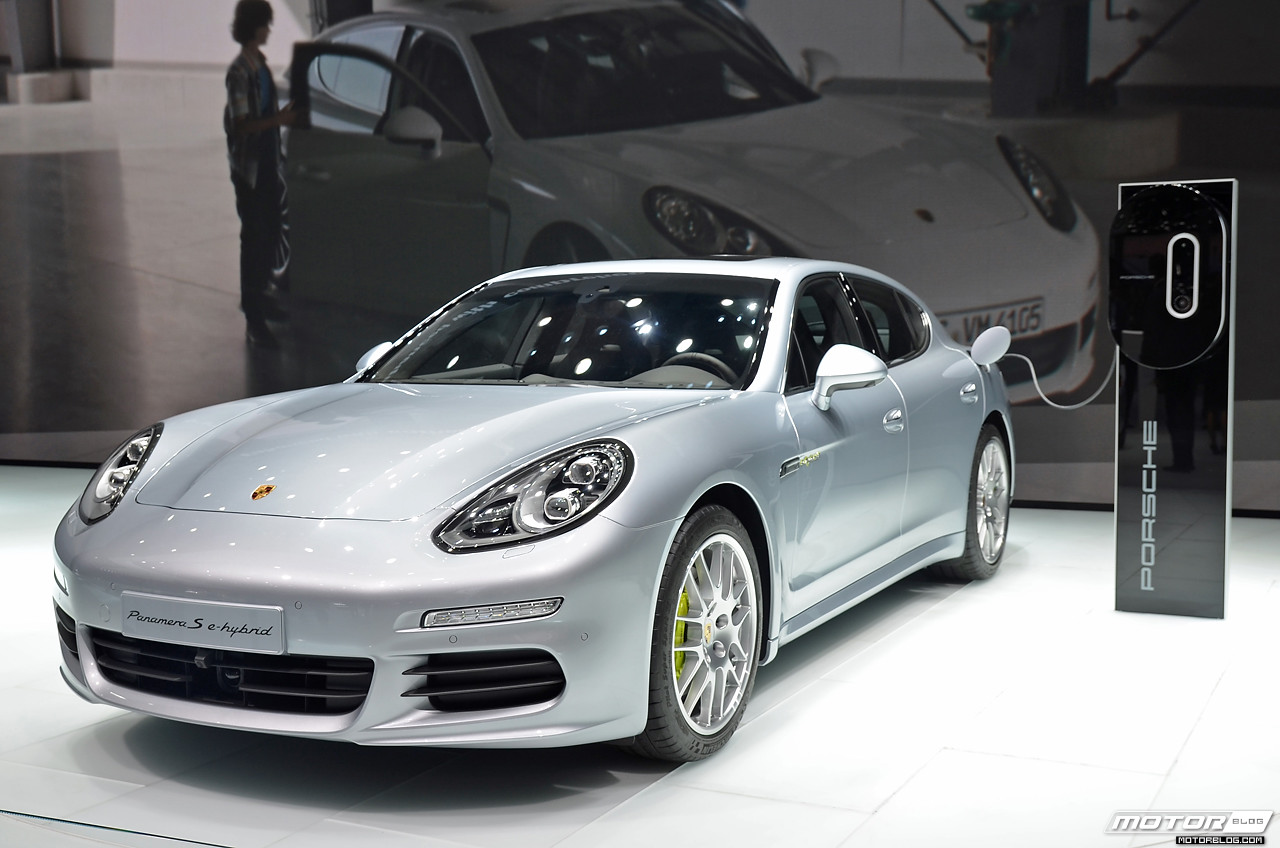
Retail deliveries of the Panamera S E-Hybrid began in the U.S. in October 2013.

As part of the 2013 Panamera facelift, Porsche announced the introduction of a plug-in hybrid model, the Panamera S E-Hybrid. The plug-in version was unveiled at the April 2013 Shanghai Auto Show. The S E-Hybrid is powered by a 71 kW (97 PS; 95 bhp) electric motor, with a total system power of 310 kW (421 PS; 416 bhp). Top speed amounted to 84 mph (135 km/h) in all-electric mode, and acceleration from 0–62 mph (100 km/h) took 5.8 seconds. The plug-in electric hybrid had a 9.4 kWh lithium-ion battery pack capable of delivering a range of more than 32 km (20 mi) under the New European Driving Cycle (NEDC) standard. The battery could be fully charged in approximately 2 1/2 hours from a 240 V power source. The Panamera plug-in hybrid reduce fuel consumption to 3.1 L/100 km (91 mpg_{‑imp}; 76 mpg_{‑US}), down from 7.11 L/100 km (39.7 mpg_{‑imp}; 33.1 mpg_{‑US}) for the current Panamera hybrid, which translates to CO_{2} emissions of 71 g/km, down from 167 g/km for the current hybrid.

In November 2013, the UK Office for Low Emission Vehicles (OLEV) approved the eligibility of the Panamera S E-Hybrid for the Plug-in Car Grant which entitles customers to a maximum purchase subsidy of £5,000 (~ US$8,000). The plug-in hybrid was rated with a fuel economy of 91 mpg_{‑imp} (3.1 L/100 km; 76 mpg_{‑US}) and CO_{2} emissions of 71 g/km.

===== EPA fuel economy ratings =====
| Vehicle | Model year | Operating mode (AER) | EPA fuel economy ratings | | | Cost to drive 25 miles | Annual Fuel Cost^{(1)} (15,000 mi) |
| Vehicle | Model year | Operating mode (AER) | Combined | City | Highway | Cost to drive 25 miles | Annual Fuel Cost^{(1)} (15,000 mi) |
|---|---|---|---|---|---|---|---|
| Panamera S E-Hybrid | 2014 | Electricity and gasoline (16 mi)^{(2)} | 50 mpg-e (52 kWh/100 mi) | - | - | US$3.55 | US$1,900 |
| Panamera S E-Hybrid | 2014 | Gasoline only | 25 mpg | 23 mpg | 29 mpg | US$3.90 | US$1,900 |
| Porsche Panamera S | 2014 | Gasoline only | 21 mpg | 17 mpg | 27 mpg | US$4.64 | US$2,800 |
| Porsche Panamera Turbo | 2014 | Gasoline only | 18 mpg | 15 mpg | 24 mpg | US$5.42 | US$3,250 |
| Porsche Panamera Turbo S | 2014 | Gasoline only | 18 mpg | 15 mpg | 24 mpg | US$5.42 | US$3,250 |
Notes: (1) Based on 45% highway and 55% city driving. Values rounded to the nearest $50. Electricity cost of US$0.12/kWh, premium gasoline price of US$3.90 per gallon (as of 4 April 2014). Conversion 1 gallon of gasoline=33.7 kWh. (2) The all-electric range is between 0 and 15 mi (24 km)

===== Markets and sales =====
The Panamera S E-Hybrid was released in the European market during the fourth quarter of 2013. Retail deliveries began in the U.S. in October 2013. As of December 2013, a total of 90 units were delivered in France, 86 units in the United States, 59 units in the Netherlands, 14 in Spain, and about 12 in Germany.

In the American market the 2014 model year price starts at US$99,000 before any applicable government incentives. Since its introduction, 698 Panamera S E-Hybrids have been sold in the United States through August 2014. Global sales between January and August 2014 totaled over 1,500 units, presenting 9% of all Panamera models sold worldwide and 1.3% of all Porsche vehicles sold during this period.

== Second generation (971 Chassis G2; 2016) ==
Second generation (971) Chassis G2
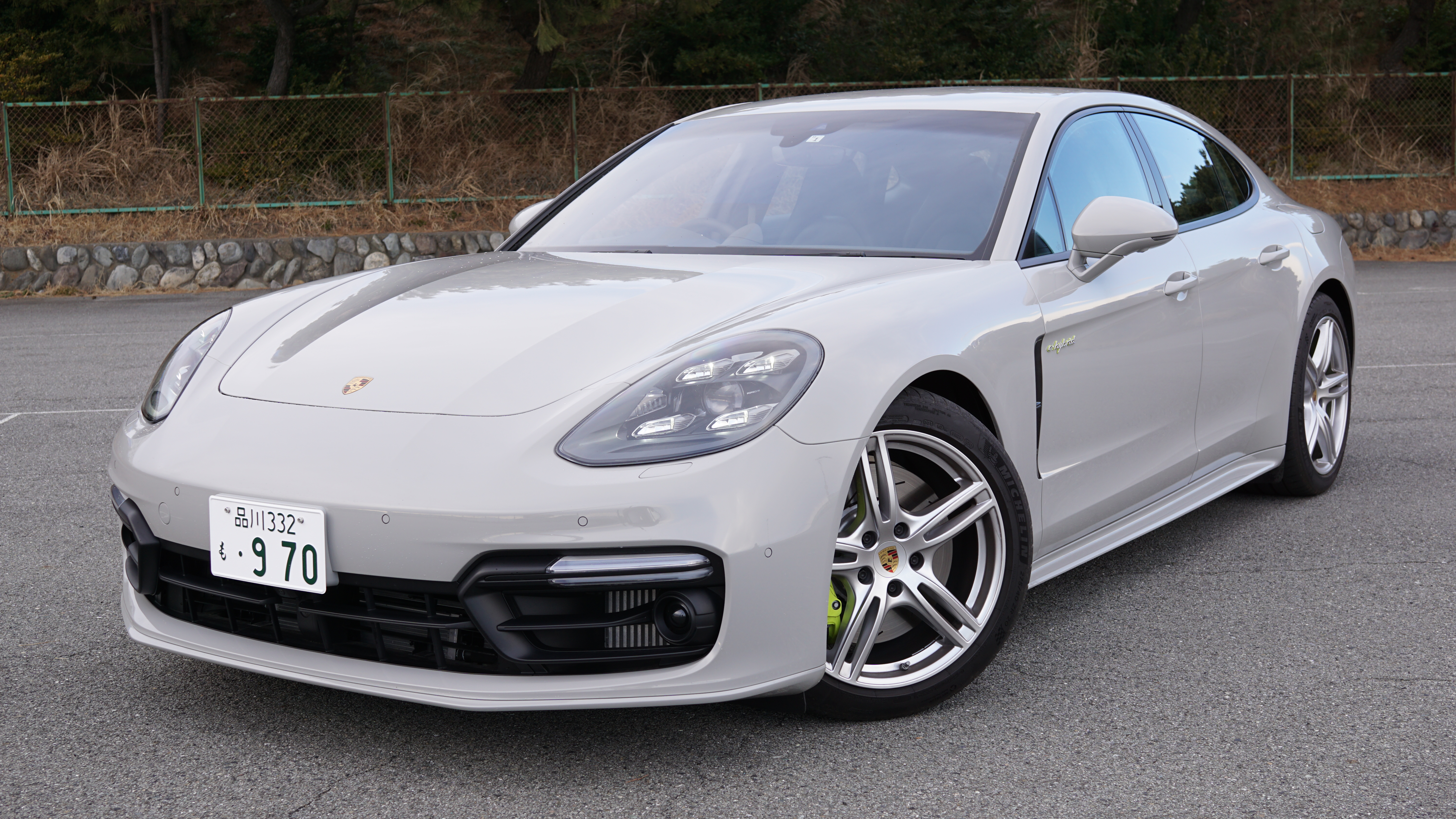
- 2017 Porsche Panamera 4 E-Hybrid (Japan)

Overview
- Production: 2016–2024
- Designer: Peter Varga

Body and chassis
- Body style: 5-door fastback/liftback sedan 5-door shooting brake
- Platform: Volkswagen Group MSB platform
- Related: Bentley Continental GT (2018); Bentley Flying Spur (2019)

Powertrain
- Engine: Petrol: 3.0 L Volkswagen-Audi EA839T turbo V6; 2.9 L Volkswagen-Audi EA839TT twin-turbo V6; 4.0 L Volkswagen-Porsche EA825TT twin-turbo V8; Diesel: 4.0 L Volkswagen-Audi EA898TTD twin-turbo V8; Plug-in Hybrid: 2.9 L Volkswagen-Audi EA839TT twin-turbo V6 + Electric motor; 4.0 L Volkswagen-Porsche EA825TT twin-turbo V8 + Electric motor
- Electric motor: 100 kW (136 PS; 134 hp) integrated Electric motor (e-Hybrid Only)
- Transmission: 8-speed PDK dual clutch
- Hybrid drivetrain: PHEV (Panamera e-Hybrid)
- Battery: Audi e-tron 14.1 kWh Lithium ion (PHEV)

Dimensions
- Wheelbase: 2,950 mm (116.1 in); 3,100 mm (122.0 in) (LWB)
- Length: 5,049 mm (198.8 in); 5,199 mm (204.7 in) (LWB)
- Width: 1,937 mm (76.3 in)
- Height: 1,423 mm (56.0 in); 1,432 mm (56.4 in) (LWB)
- Curb weight: 1,815–2,310 kg (4,001–5,093 lb)

The second generation Panamera was revealed on 28 June 2016 at a special event in Berlin, Germany. Codenamed 971, it is 35 mm (1.4 in) longer, 5 mm (0.2 in) wider and 5 mm (0.2 in) taller than the first generation Panamera, with a 30 mm (1.2 in) longer wheelbase. The interior features a redesigned dashboard layout, with touch-sensitive surfaces replacing the previous generation's array of buttons. A centrally mounted tachometer also harks back to the 1955 Porsche 356 A.

The second generation includes two seven-inch displays in place of the dials, as well as a 12.3-inch touchscreen featuring online sat-nav, Apple CarPlay integration and an updated voice control system. Under the bonnet is a new engine range, with only the Panamera 4S, 4S Diesel and flagship Turbo available from launch.

In March 2017, Porsche unveiled the Panamera Turbo S E-Hybrid, a plug-in hybrid for the 2018 model year. The Turbo S E-Hybrid received the 4.0 L V8 engine from the Panamera Turbo, but is also be paired with an electric motor. Total system power is 680 PS (500 kW; 671 bhp), which makes it the third most powerful Porsche ever, after the 918 Spyder and 991 GT2 RS.

In August 2017, Panamera 4S Diesel and Panamera Sport Turismo 4S Diesel were deleted from Porsche's German website and configurator. The automotive magazine Auto Motor und Sport discovered the higher than permittable amount, which is one-and-half times more than legal limit, during the exhaust testing. The issue was with SCR catalysator and urea injection. In September 2018 Porsche announced that the company had decided to no longer offer diesel propulsion in future.

In August 2020 (for the 2021 model year), the Panamera was facelifted.

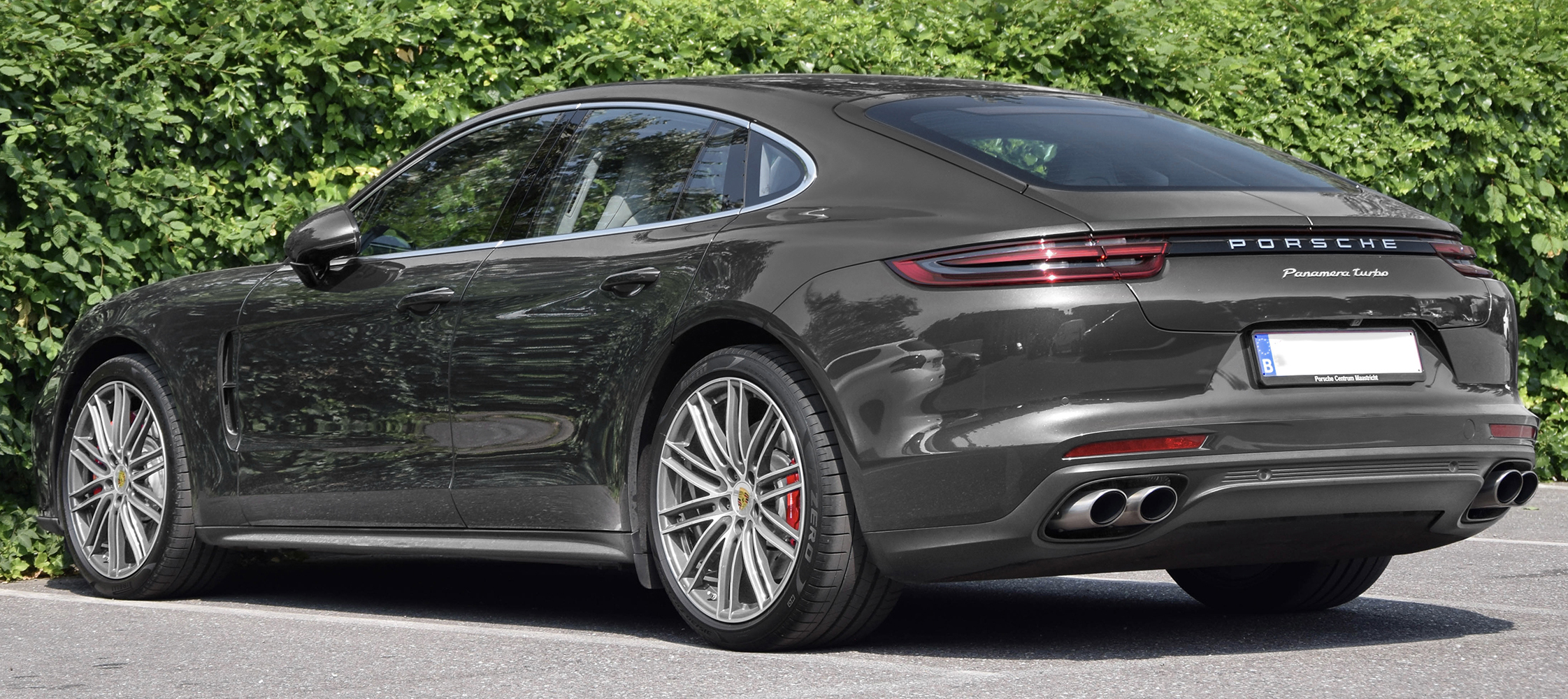
Porsche Panamera Turbo fastback sedan

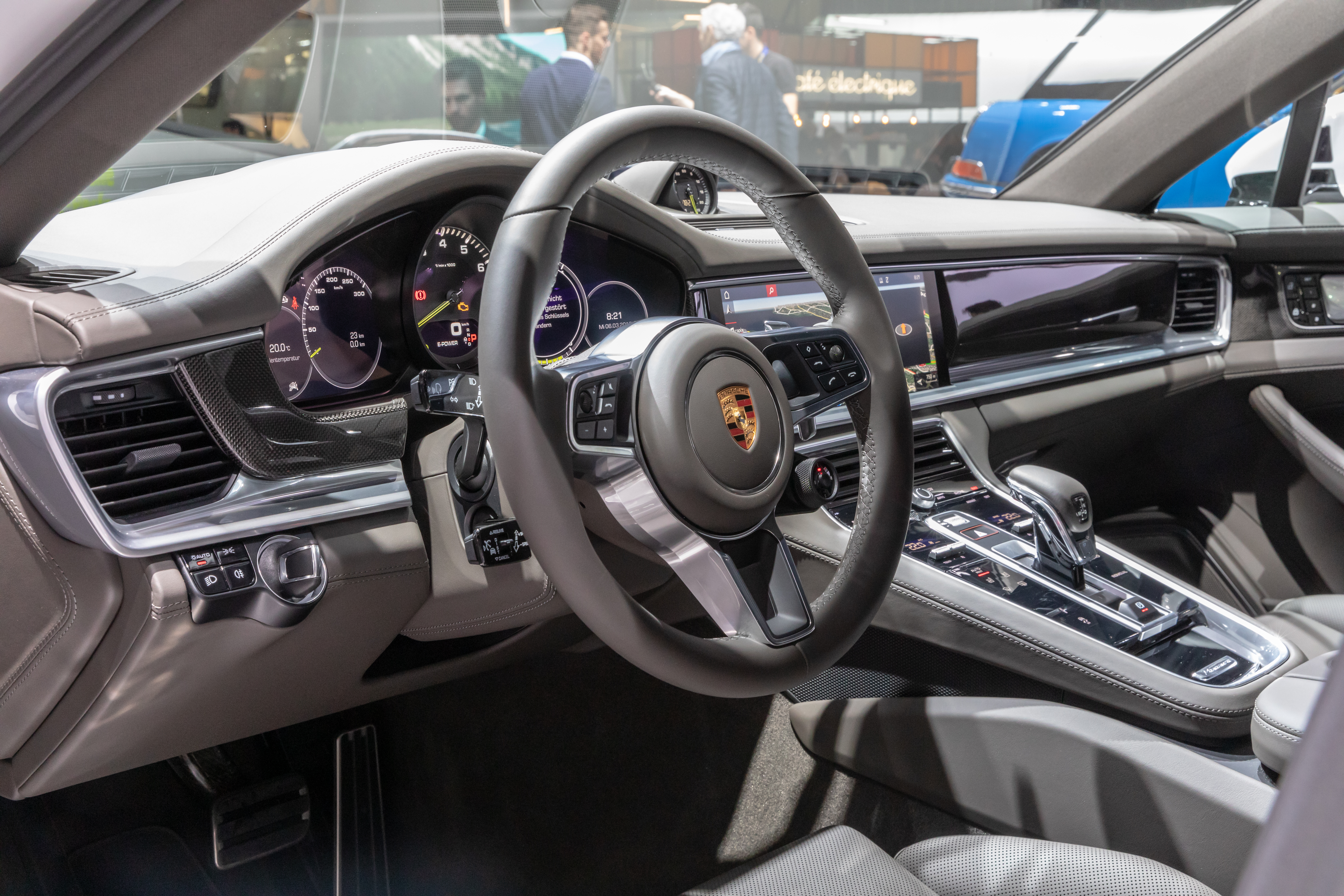
interior

=== Exterior design ===
The second-gen Panamera no longer has its predecessor's oft-criticized hatchback wagon styling, with the tail of the new vehicle developing a clear link to the Porsche 911 through the full width rear LED light bar, and the sharply creased tail and upper bumper. This improvement in design has helped clarify the model's identity as a sports-oriented GT car.

==== Sport Turismo ====
In Europe a 5-door, shooting-brake estate variant, called the Sport Turismo, was offered alongside the liftback/fastback saloon. It was also available in the United States. The Panamera Sport Turismo debuted in March 2017 at the Geneva Motor Show, and was available with the same engine range as the 4-door car. In September 2017 Porsche announced the Panamera Turbo S E-Hybrid Sport Turismo, the 5-door estate version of the flagship Turbo S E-Hybrid, which had previously only been available as a 4-door configuration. As of September 2017, the 680 PS (500 kW; 671 bhp) Panamera Turbo S E-Hybrid Sport Turismo is currently the world's most powerful stock estate car, besting the 612 PS (450 kW; 604 bhp) Mercedes-AMG E 63 S and the 605 PS (445 kW; 597 bhp) Audi RS6 Performance.

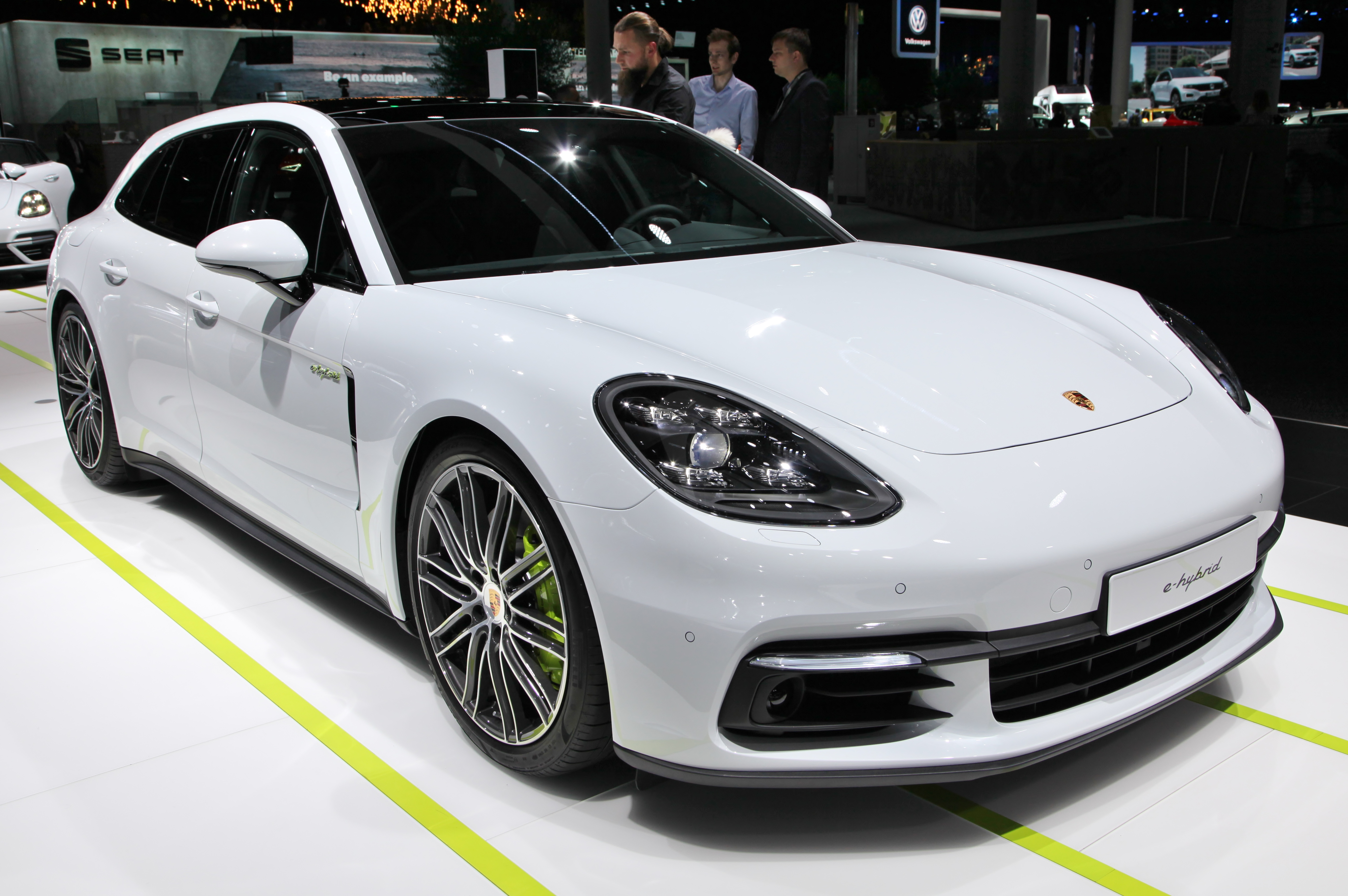
Porsche Panamera Sport Turismo e-Hybrid

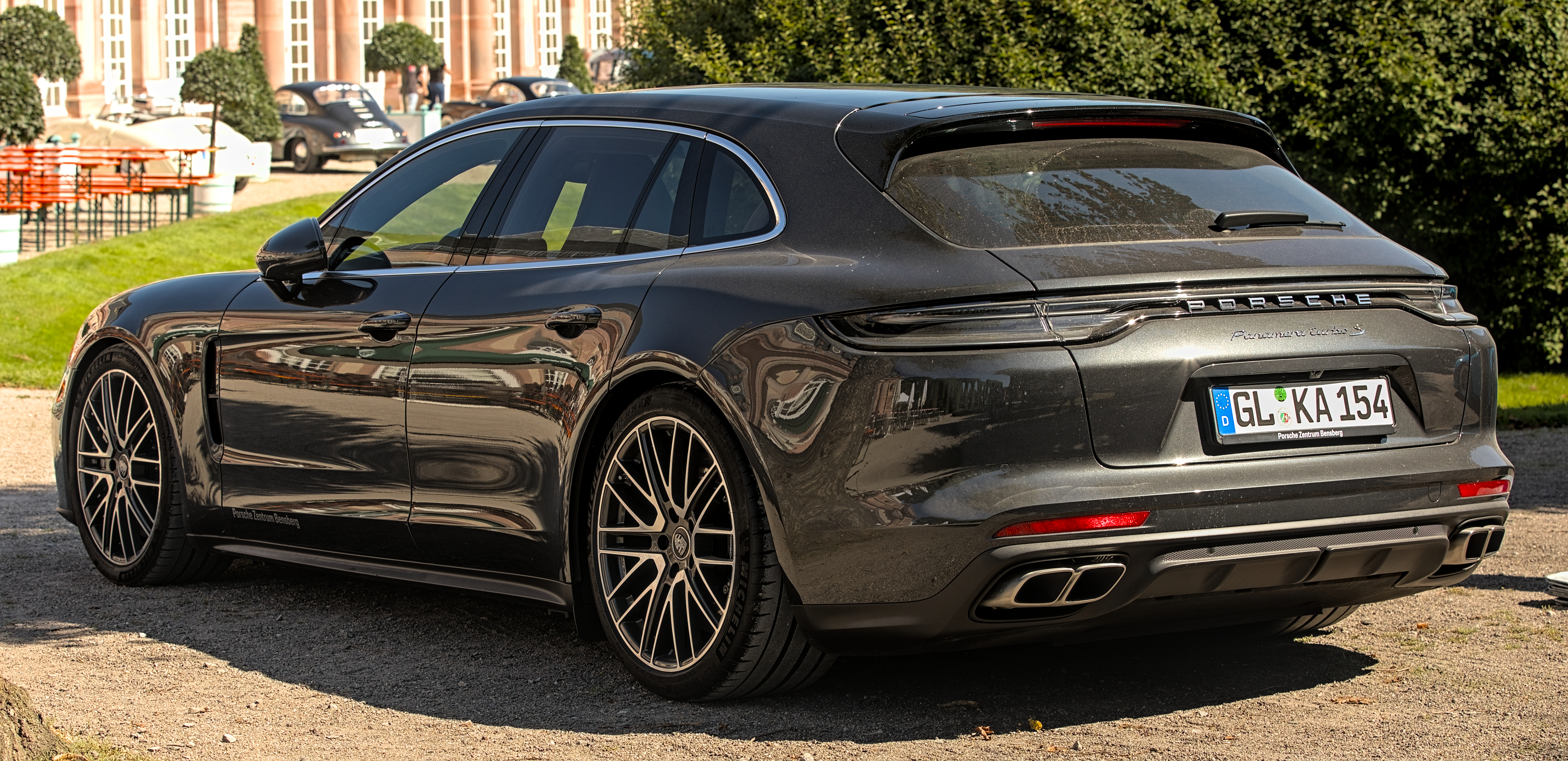
Rear view

Facelift

GTS (rear view)

=== Engines ===
| Car Model | | Years | Powertrain | Max. Power | Max. Torque |
|---|---|---|---|---|---|
| Panamera | | 2016–2020 | Volkswagen-Audi EA839T Turbocharged V6, 2,995 cc (3.0 L; 182.8 cu in), petrol | 330 PS (243 kW; 325 bhp) at 5400–6400 rpm | 450 N⋅m (332 lb⋅ft) at 1800–5000 rpm |
| Panamera 4 | | 2016–2020 | Volkswagen-Audi EA839T Turbocharged V6, 2,995 cc (3.0 L; 182.8 cu in), petrol | 330 PS (243 kW; 325 bhp) at 5400–6400 rpm | 450 N⋅m (332 lb⋅ft) at 1800–5000 rpm |
| Panamera 4 E-Hybrid | Combustion Engine | 2016–2024 | Volkswagen-Audi EA839TT Twin-Turbocharged V6, 2,894 cc (2.9 L; 176.6 cu in), petrol (with electric motor) | 330 PS (243 kW; 325 bhp) at 5250–6500 rpm | 450 N⋅m (332 lb⋅ft) at 1750–5000 rpm |
| Panamera 4 E-Hybrid | Electric motor | 2016–2024 | Volkswagen-Audi EA839TT Twin-Turbocharged V6, 2,894 cc (2.9 L; 176.6 cu in), petrol (with electric motor) | 136 PS (100 kW; 134 bhp) at 2800 rpm | 400 N⋅m (295 lb⋅ft) at < 2300 rpm |
| Panamera 4 E-Hybrid | Combined | 2016–2024 | Volkswagen-Audi EA839TT Twin-Turbocharged V6, 2,894 cc (2.9 L; 176.6 cu in), petrol (with electric motor) | 462 PS (340 kW; 456 bhp) at 6000 rpm | 700 N⋅m (516 lb⋅ft) at 1100–4500 rpm |
| Panamera 4S | | 2016–2024 | Volkswagen-Audi EA839TT Twin-turbocharged V6, 2,894 cc (2.9 L; 176.6 cu in), petrol | 440 PS (324 kW; 434 bhp) at 5650–6600 rpm | 549 N⋅m (405 lb⋅ft) at 1750–5500 rpm |
| Panamera 4S Diesel | | 2016–2018 | Volkswagen-Audi EA898TTD Twin-turbocharged V8, 3,956 cc (4.0 L; 241.4 cu in), diesel | 422 PS (310 kW; 416 bhp) at 3500–5000 rpm | 850 N⋅m (627 lb⋅ft) at 1000–3250 rpm |
| Panamera GTS | | 2019–2020 | Volkswagen-Porsche EA825TT Twin-turbocharged V8, 3,996 cc (4.0 L; 243.9 cu in), petrol | 460 PS (338 kW; 454 bhp) at 5750–6000 rpm | 620 N⋅m (457 lb⋅ft) at 1960–4500 rpm |
| Panamera Turbo | | 2016–2020 | Volkswagen-Porsche EA825TT Twin-turbocharged V8, 3,996 cc (4.0 L; 243.9 cu in), petrol | 550 PS (405 kW; 542 bhp) at 5750–6000 rpm | 770 N⋅m (568 lb⋅ft) at 1960–4500 rpm |
| Panamera Turbo S E-Hybrid | Combustion Engine | 2017–2020 | Volkswagen-Porsche EA825TT Twin-turbocharged V8, 3,996 cc (4.0 L; 243.9 cu in), petrol (with electric motor) | 549 PS (404 kW; 541 bhp) at 5750–6000 rpm | 770 N⋅m (568 lb⋅ft) at 1960–4500 rpm |
| Panamera Turbo S E-Hybrid | Electric motor | 2017–2020 | Volkswagen-Porsche EA825TT Twin-turbocharged V8, 3,996 cc (4.0 L; 243.9 cu in), petrol (with electric motor) | 136 PS (100 kW; 134 bhp) at 2800 rpm | 400 N⋅m (295 lb⋅ft) at < 2300 rpm |
| Panamera Turbo S E-Hybrid | Combined | 2017–2020 | Volkswagen-Porsche EA825TT Twin-turbocharged V8, 3,996 cc (4.0 L; 243.9 cu in), petrol (with electric motor) | 680 PS (500 kW; 671 bhp) at 6000 rpm | 850 N⋅m (627 lb⋅ft) at 1400–5500 rpm |
| Panamera (Facelift) | | 2021–2024 | Volkswagen-Audi EA839TT Twin-Turbocharged V6, 2,894 cc (2.9 L; 176.6 cu in), petrol | 330 PS (243 kW; 325 bhp) at 5400–6400 rpm | 450 N⋅m (332 lb⋅ft) at 1800–5000 rpm |
| Panamera 4 (Facelift) | | 2021–2024 | Volkswagen-Audi EA839TT Twin-Turbocharged V6, 2,894 cc (2.9 L; 176.6 cu in), petrol | 330 PS (243 kW; 325 bhp) at 5400–6400 rpm | 450 N⋅m (332 lb⋅ft) at 1800–5000 rpm |
| Panamera 4S E-Hybrid | Combustion Engine | 2021–2024 | Volkswagen-Audi EA839TT Twin-Turbocharged V6, 2,894 cc (2.9 L; 176.6 cu in), petrol (with electric motor) | 440 PS (324 kW; 434 bhp) at 5250–6500 rpm | 450 N⋅m (332 lb⋅ft) at 1750–5000 rpm |
| Panamera 4S E-Hybrid | Electric motor | 2021–2024 | Volkswagen-Audi EA839TT Twin-Turbocharged V6, 2,894 cc (2.9 L; 176.6 cu in), petrol (with electric motor) | 136 PS (100 kW; 134 bhp) at 2800 rpm | 400 N⋅m (295 lb⋅ft) at 2300 rpm |
| Panamera 4S E-Hybrid | Combined | 2021–2024 | Volkswagen-Audi EA839TT Twin-Turbocharged V6, 2,894 cc (2.9 L; 176.6 cu in), petrol (with electric motor) | 560 PS (412 kW; 552 bhp) at 6000 rpm | 750 N⋅m (553 lb⋅ft) at 1100–4500 rpm |
| Panamera GTS (Facelift) | | 2021–2024 | Volkswagen-Porsche EA825TT Twin-turbocharged V8, 3,996 cc (4.0 L; 243.9 cu in), petrol | 480 PS (353 kW; 473 bhp) at 6500 rpm | 620 N⋅m (457 lb⋅ft) at 1800–4000 rpm |
| Panamera Turbo S | | 2021–2024 | Volkswagen-Porsche EA825TT Twin-turbocharged V8, 3,996 cc (4.0 L; 243.9 cu in), petrol | 630 PS (463 kW; 621 bhp) at 5750–6000 rpm | 820 N⋅m (605 lb⋅ft) at 1960–4500 rpm |
| Panamera Turbo S E-Hybrid (Facelift) | Combustion Engine | 2021–2024 | Volkswagen-Porsche EA825TT Twin-turbocharged V8, 3,996 cc (4.0 L; 243.9 cu in), petrol (with electric motor) | 571 PS (420 kW; 563 bhp) at 5750–6000 rpm | 770 N⋅m (568 lb⋅ft) at 2100–4500 rpm |
| Panamera Turbo S E-Hybrid (Facelift) | Electric motor | 2021–2024 | Volkswagen-Porsche EA825TT Twin-turbocharged V8, 3,996 cc (4.0 L; 243.9 cu in), petrol (with electric motor) | 136 PS (100 kW; 134 bhp) at 2800 rpm | 400 N⋅m (295 lb⋅ft) at 2300 rpm |
| Panamera Turbo S E-Hybrid (Facelift) | Combined | 2021–2024 | Volkswagen-Porsche EA825TT Twin-turbocharged V8, 3,996 cc (4.0 L; 243.9 cu in), petrol (with electric motor) | 700 PS (515 kW; 690 bhp) at 6000 rpm | 870 N⋅m (642 lb⋅ft) at 1400–5500 rpm |

=== Performance ===
| Car Model | Years | 0 to 100 km/h (62 mph) | Top Speed | CO_{2} emissions |
|---|---|---|---|---|
| Panamera | 2016–2024 | 5.6 s | 2016–2020, 262 km/h (163 mph) 2021–2024, 268 km/h (167 mph) | 197–201 kg/m |
| Panamera 4 | 2016–2024 | 5.3 s | 2016–2020, 262 km/h (163 mph) 2021–2024, 268 km/h (167 mph) | 192–194 g/km 199–202 g/km |
| Panamera 4 E-Hybrid | 2016–2024 | 2016–2020, 4.6 s 2021–2024, 4.4 s | 2016–2020, 278 km/h (173 mph) 2021–2024, 280 km/h (174 mph) | 56 g/km 47–49 g/km |
| Panamera 4S | 2016–2024 | 2016–2020, 4.2 s 2021–2024, 4.3 s | 2016–2020, 289 km/h (180 mph) 2021–2024, 295 km/h (183 mph) | 184–186 g/km 201–205, g/km |
| Panamera 4S Diesel | 2016–2018 | 4.5 s | 285 km/h (177 mph) | 176 g/km |
| Panamera 4S E-Hybrid | 2021–2024 | 3.5 s | 298 km/h (185 mph) | 47–51 g/km |
| Panamera GTS | 2019–2024 | 2019–2020, 4.1 s 2021–2024, 3.9 s | 2019–2020, 298 km/h (185 mph) 2021–, 300 km/h (186 mph) | 235 g/km 244–249 g/km |
| Panamera Turbo | 2016–2020 | 3.6 s | 306 km/h (190 mph) | 212–214 g/km |
| Panamera Turbo S | 2021–2024 | 3.2 s | 315 km/h (196 mph) | 245–247 g/km |
| Panamera Turbo S E-Hybrid | 2017–2024 | 2017–2020, 3.4 s 2021–2024, 3.2 s | 2017–2020, 310 km/h (193 mph) 2021–2024, 315 km/h (196 mph) | 66 g/km 62 g/km |

== Third generation (976 Chassis G3; 2024) ==
Third generation (976) Chassis G3
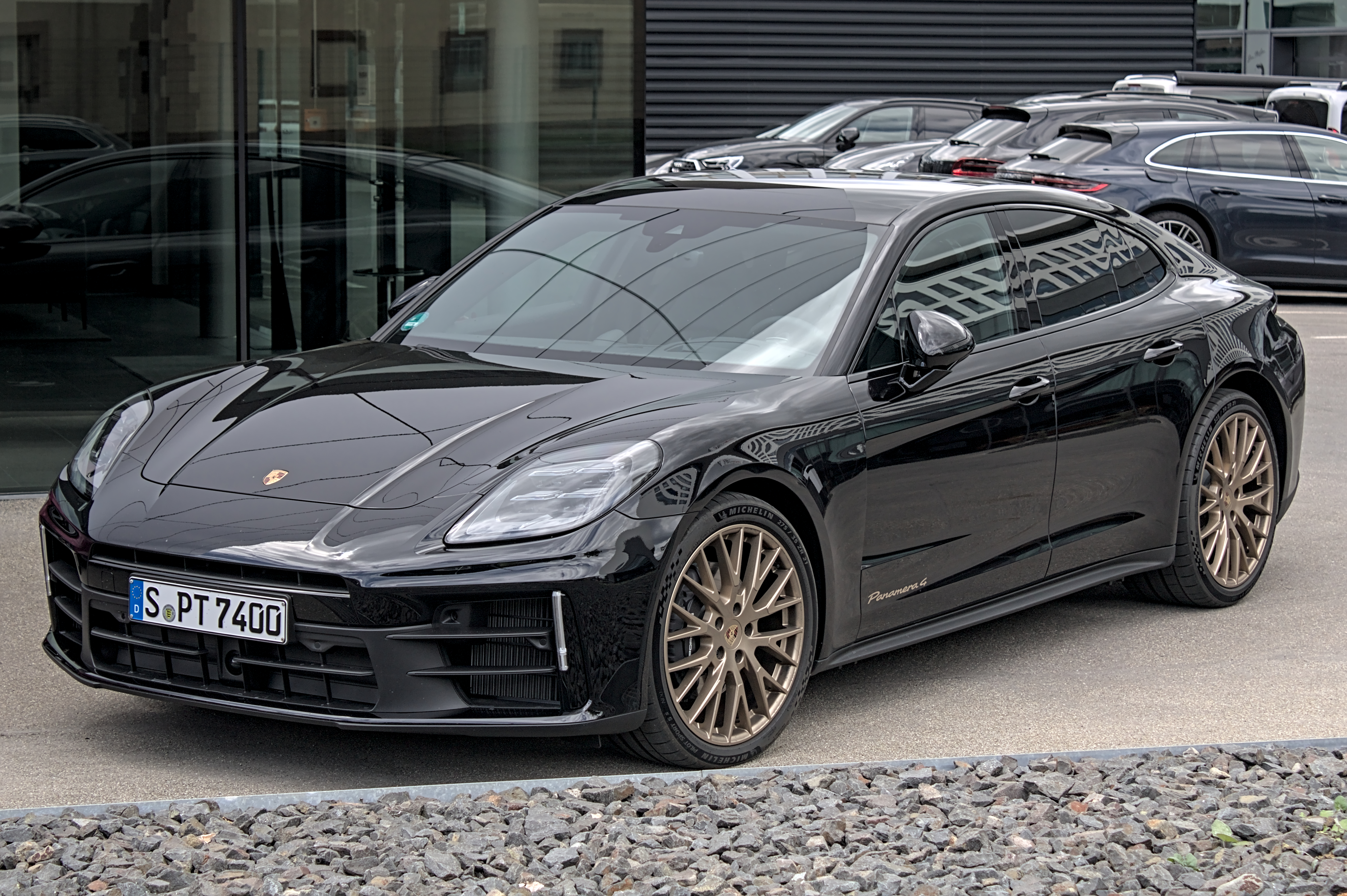

Overview
- Production: 2024–present
- Designer: James Burgess

Body and chassis
- Platform: Volkswagen Group MSB platform

Powertrain
- Engine: Petrol: 3.0 L Volkswagen-Audi EA839T turbocharged V6; 4.0 L Volkswagen-Porsche EA825TT twin-turbocharged V8 Petrol plug-in hybrid: 2.9 L Volkswagen-Audi EA839TT twin-turbocharged V6 + Electric motor 4.0 L Volkswagen-Porsche EA825TT twin-turbocharged V8 + Electric motor
- Electric motor: 140 kW (190 PS; 188 hp) integrated electric motor (E-Hybrid only)
- Battery: 21.8 kWh (PHEV)

Dimensions
- Wheelbase: 2,950 mm (116.1 in); 3,100 mm (122.0 in) (LWB)
- Length: 5,052 mm (198.9 in); 5,202 mm (204.8 in) (LWB)
- Width: 1,937 mm (76.3 in)
- Height: 1,423 mm (56.0 in); 1,425 mm (56.1 in) (LWB)
- Kerb weight: 1,885–2,360 kg (4,156–5,203 lb) (DIN); 2,400 kg (5,291 lb) (LWB)

The third generation of the Panamera was officially presented on 24 November 2023, with Porsche providing details for the mid-range Panamera 4 and Turbo E-Hybrid models; details on the Turbo S E-Hybrid and GTS models are expected to be available later. Eventually, Porsche will offer four different E-Hybrid powertrain options.

=== Exterior design ===
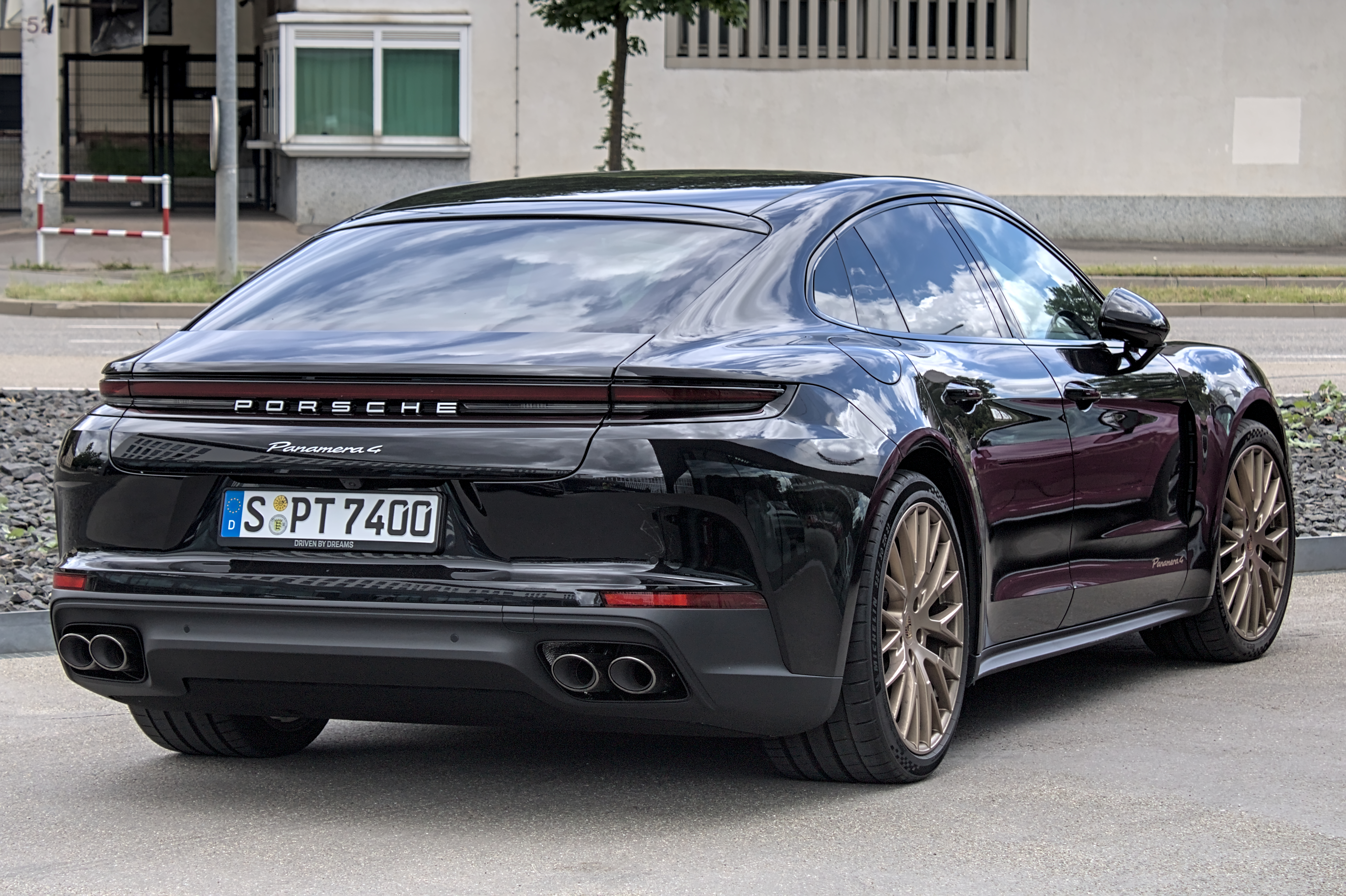
2024 Porsche Panamera rear

Compared to the second generation, the third generation has a small frontal air inlet above the license plate bracket; other styling changes were characterized as "incremental". The Sport Turismo shooting brake body has been dropped.

=== Engines ===
Panamera (Model 976, 3rd gen) engines
| car model | | displacement & configuration | max. motive power at rpm | max. torque at rpm | max. speed | emissions CO_{2} |
|---|---|---|---|---|---|---|
| Panamera | | 2.9 L (2,894 cc) Volkswagen-Audi EA839T turbo V6 | 353 PS (260 kW; 348 bhp) at 5,400 | 500 N⋅m (369 lbf⋅ft) at 1,900 | 272 km/h (169 mph) | 239–219 g/km |
| Panamera 4 | | 2.9 L (2,894 cc) Volkswagen-Audi EA839T turbo V6 | 353 PS (260 kW; 348 bhp) at 5,400 | 500 N⋅m (369 lbf⋅ft) at 1,900 | 270 km/h (168 mph) | 253–230 g/km |
| Panamera 4 E-Hybrid | Gasoline engine | 2.9 L (2,894 cc) Volkswagen-Audi EA839T turbo V6 + electric motor | 304 PS (224 kW; 300 bhp) at 6,800 | 420 N⋅m (310 lbf⋅ft) at 1,900 | 280 km/h (174 mph) | 69–86 g/km |
| Panamera 4 E-Hybrid | Electric motor | 2.9 L (2,894 cc) Volkswagen-Audi EA839T turbo V6 + electric motor | 190 PS (140 kW; 187 bhp) | 450 N⋅m (332 lbf⋅ft) | 280 km/h (174 mph) | 69–86 g/km |
| Panamera 4 E-Hybrid | Combined | 2.9 L (2,894 cc) Volkswagen-Audi EA839T turbo V6 + electric motor | 470 PS (346 kW; 464 bhp) | 650 N⋅m (479 lbf⋅ft) | 280 km/h (174 mph) | 69–86 g/km |
| Panamera 4S E-Hybrid | Gasoline engine | 2.9 L (2,894 cc) Volkswagen-Audi EA839T turbo V6 + electric motor | 353 PS (260 kW; 348 bhp) at 6,700 | 500 N⋅m (369 lbf⋅ft) at 1,900 | 290 km/h (180 mph) | 74-91 g/km |
| Panamera 4S E-Hybrid | Electric motor | 2.9 L (2,894 cc) Volkswagen-Audi EA839T turbo V6 + electric motor | 190 PS (140 kW; 187 bhp) | 450 N⋅m (332 lbf⋅ft) | 290 km/h (180 mph) | 74-91 g/km |
| Panamera 4S E-Hybrid | Combined | 2.9 L (2,894 cc) Volkswagen-Audi EA839T turbo V6 + electric motor | 544 PS (400 kW; 537 bhp) | 750 N⋅m (553 lbf⋅ft) | 290 km/h (180 mph) | 74-91 g/km |
| Panamera GTS | | 4.0 L (3,996 cc) Volkswagen-Porsche EA825TT twin-turbo | 500 PS (368 kW; 493 bhp) at 6,500 | 660 N⋅m (487 lbf⋅ft) at 2,100 | 302 km/h (188 mph) | 264-283 g/km |
| Panamera Turbo E-Hybrid | Gasoline engine | 4.0 L (3,996 cc) Volkswagen-Porsche EA825TT twin-turbo V8 + electric motor | 519 PS (382 kW; 512 bhp) at 6,000 | 770 N⋅m (568 lbf⋅ft) at 2,330 | 315 km/h (196 mph) | 38–26 g/km |
| Panamera Turbo E-Hybrid | Electric motor | 4.0 L (3,996 cc) Volkswagen-Porsche EA825TT twin-turbo V8 + electric motor | 190 PS (140 kW; 187 bhp) | 450 N⋅m (332 lbf⋅ft) | 315 km/h (196 mph) | 38–26 g/km |
| Panamera Turbo E-Hybrid | Combined | 4.0 L (3,996 cc) Volkswagen-Porsche EA825TT twin-turbo V8 + electric motor | 680 PS (500 kW; 671 bhp) | 930 N⋅m (686 lbf⋅ft) | 315 km/h (196 mph) | 38–26 g/km |
| Panamera Turbo S E-Hybrid | Gasoline engine | 4.0 L (3,996 cc) Volkswagen-Porsche EA825TT twin-turbo V8 + electric motor | 599 PS (441 kW; 591 bhp) at 6,000 | 800 N⋅m (590 lbf⋅ft) at 2,330 | 325 km/h (202 mph) | 47 g/km |
| Panamera Turbo S E-Hybrid | Electric motor | 4.0 L (3,996 cc) Volkswagen-Porsche EA825TT twin-turbo V8 + electric motor | 190 PS (140 kW; 187 bhp) | 450 N⋅m (332 lbf⋅ft) | 325 km/h (202 mph) | 47 g/km |
| Panamera Turbo S E-Hybrid | Combined | 4.0 L (3,996 cc) Volkswagen-Porsche EA825TT twin-turbo V8 + electric motor | 782 PS (575 kW; 771 bhp) | 1,000 N⋅m (738 lbf⋅ft) | 325 km/h (202 mph) | 47 g/km |

==== E-Hybrid ====
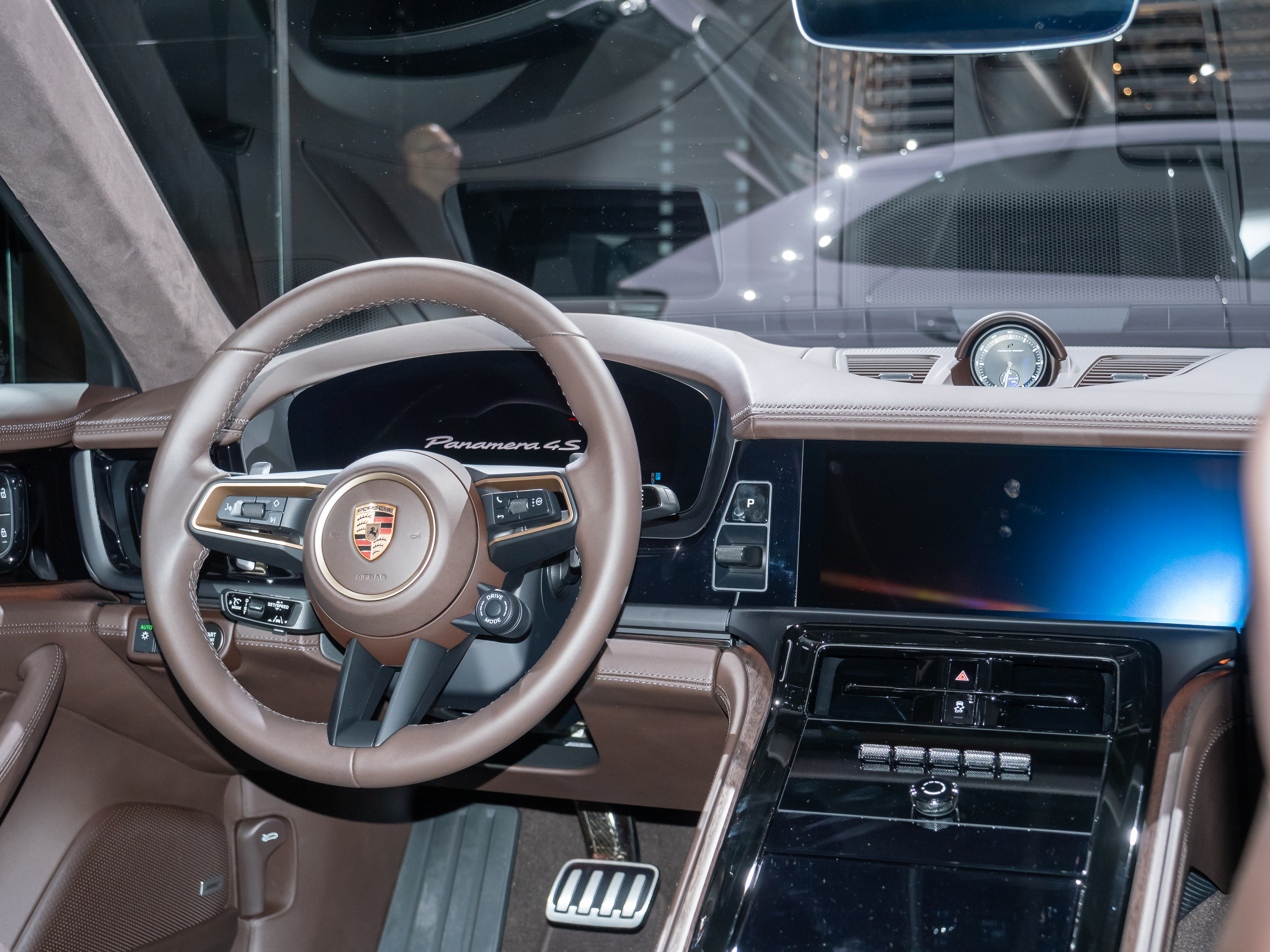
2024 Porsche Panamera 4S interior

For the plug-in Turbo E-Hybrid model, the 370 V traction battery has a storage capacity of 25.9 kW-hr (gross; 21.8 kW-hr net), giving the vehicle a maximum all-electric range of 90 km (56 mi) under the WLTP cycle. The electric motor is integrated into the transmission. It is equipped with an onboard charger that accepts AC power at a maximum rate of 11 kW; at that rate, it takes 138 minutes to recharge the battery fully.

=== Chassis and suspension ===
Base models are equipped with an air suspension that has two air chambers and twin-valve dampers, independently adjustable for rebound and compression. The E-Hybrid can be equipped with an active suspension as an option, called Porsche Active Ride, which uses a single air chamber and electrohydraulic actuators to control each wheel independently. The active suspension is designed to stabilize the body under dynamic conditions, such as resisting lean in corners and weight transfer during acceleration and deceleration. In addition, it lifts the car by 55 mm (2.2 in) during entry and exit to ease access.

Centerlock wheels and rear-wheel steering also are available as options.

== Reception ==
Despite the differences in dimensions and design, a reviewer noted that the Panamera's driving dynamics were close to that of the 911, and it "seems to occupy the no-man's-land between really good sports sedans and proper sports cars", and so far the Panamera has won some comparison tests against other four-door performance cars on the market such as the Maserati Quattroporte and Aston Martin Rapide. Function was also praised, with the 15.7 cubic feet (440 L) hatchback trunk, and the four-corner adaptive air suspension that retained superior handling while also providing a comfortable ride for public roads.

Unlike most V8-engined contemporaries, all models of the Panamera avoid the US Gas Guzzler Tax. The V6-powered Panamera was also praised, as its smaller engine still retained respectable acceleration, and as it had improved handling over its V8 siblings, due to the engine being lighter by 100 lb (45 kg) which gave the car better weight distribution.

However, CAR magazine of the UK described the S model as lacking sportiness, which they attributed to their test car's being "about as oriented to comfort as it's possible to get" and called the Turbo model "a missed opportunity on behalf of Porsche" to be "the world's first lightweight four seater" as the top model weighs as much as an Audi S8.

The 30 November 2008 edition of BBC's Top Gear featured a look at the Panamera in its news section, with the three presenters being very critical of the look. In the June 2009 edition, Richard Hammond and James May were seen driving the Panamera along the A30 in Devon, Great Britain. They were racing against a letter sent via Royal Mail between the Isles of Scilly and the Orkney Islands.

== Sales ==
As of 2011, the largest national market was the United States with 6188 sold. Sales by cities: Los Angeles (890), New York (760), Hong Kong (300), Dubai (285), Tokyo (223), Munich (206), Moscow (203), Shanghai (188), Hamburg (117) and Berlin (108). Sales internationally by model variant: Panamera 4S (9394), Turbo (6171), S (4563) and V6 (2390—introduced weeks earlier).

In 2012, U.S. sales of the Panamera totaled 7614 and Canadian sales of the Panamera totaled 422. In 2017, most of the Panameras sold in Northern Europe were hybrids.

| Year | China | | |
| Year | Panamera | E-Hybrid | Total |
|---|---|---|---|
| 2023 | 18,922 | 2,320 | 21,242 |
| 2024 | 15,333 | 557 | 15,890 |
| 2025 | 12,173 | 183 | 12,356 |

== Publicity ==
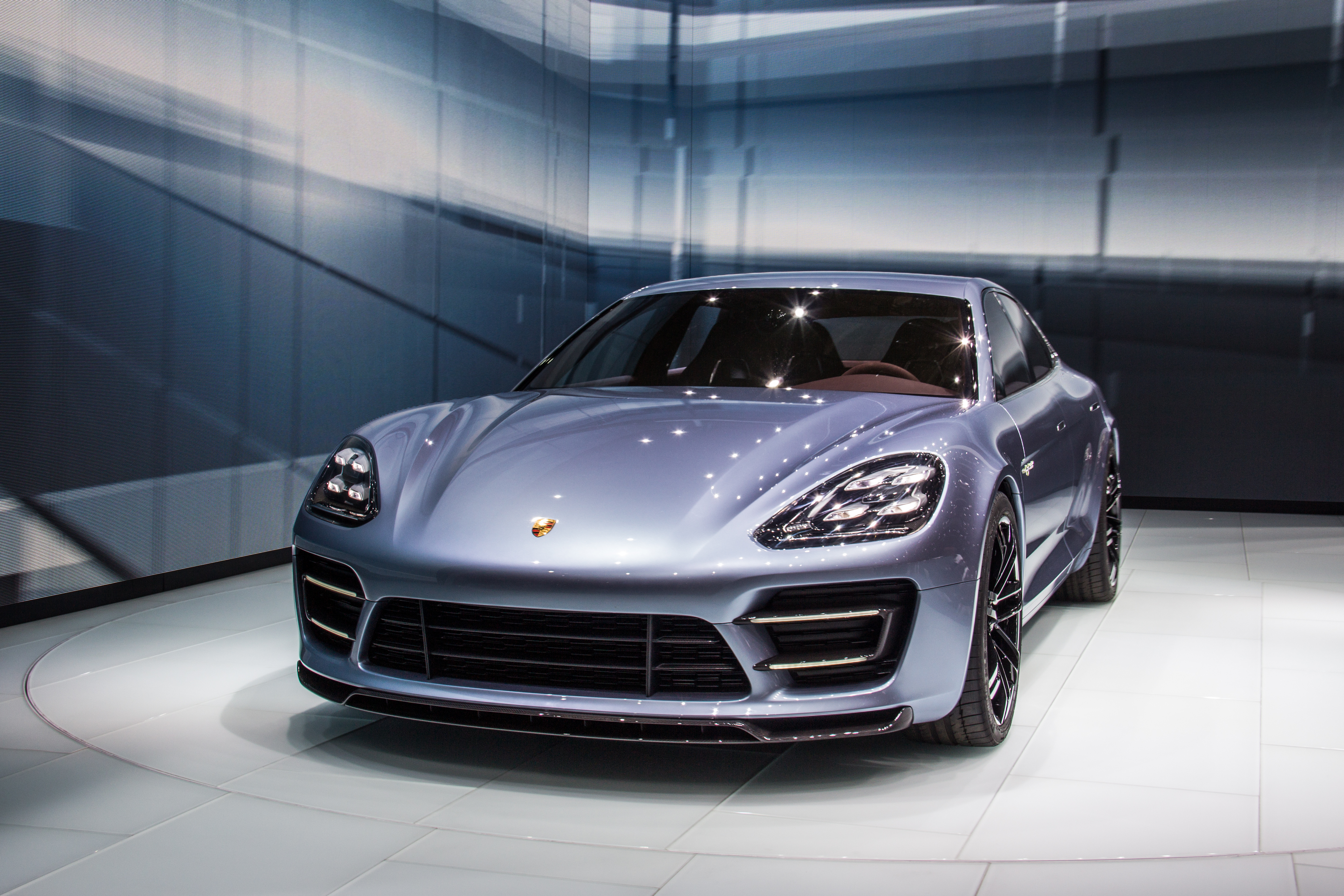

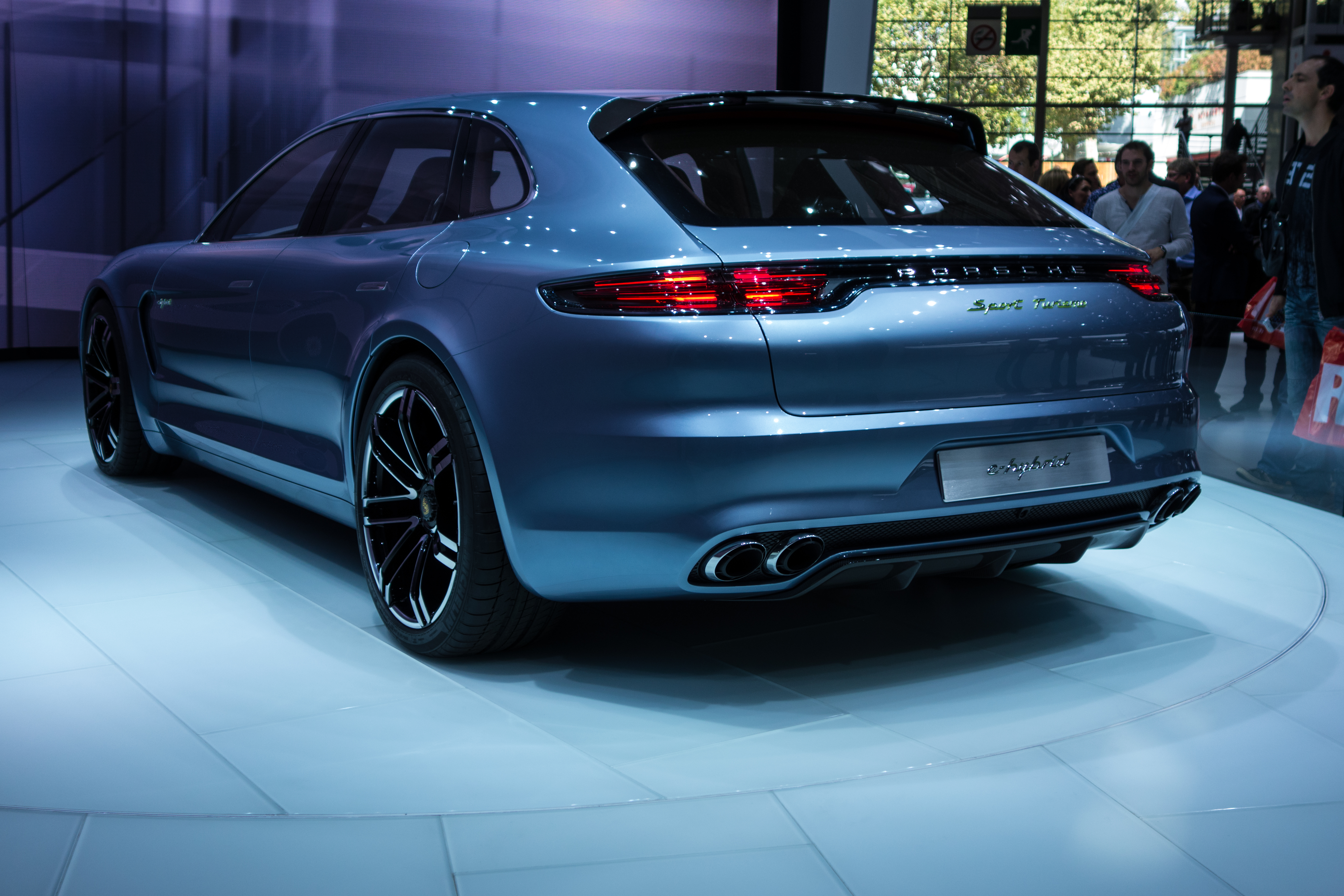

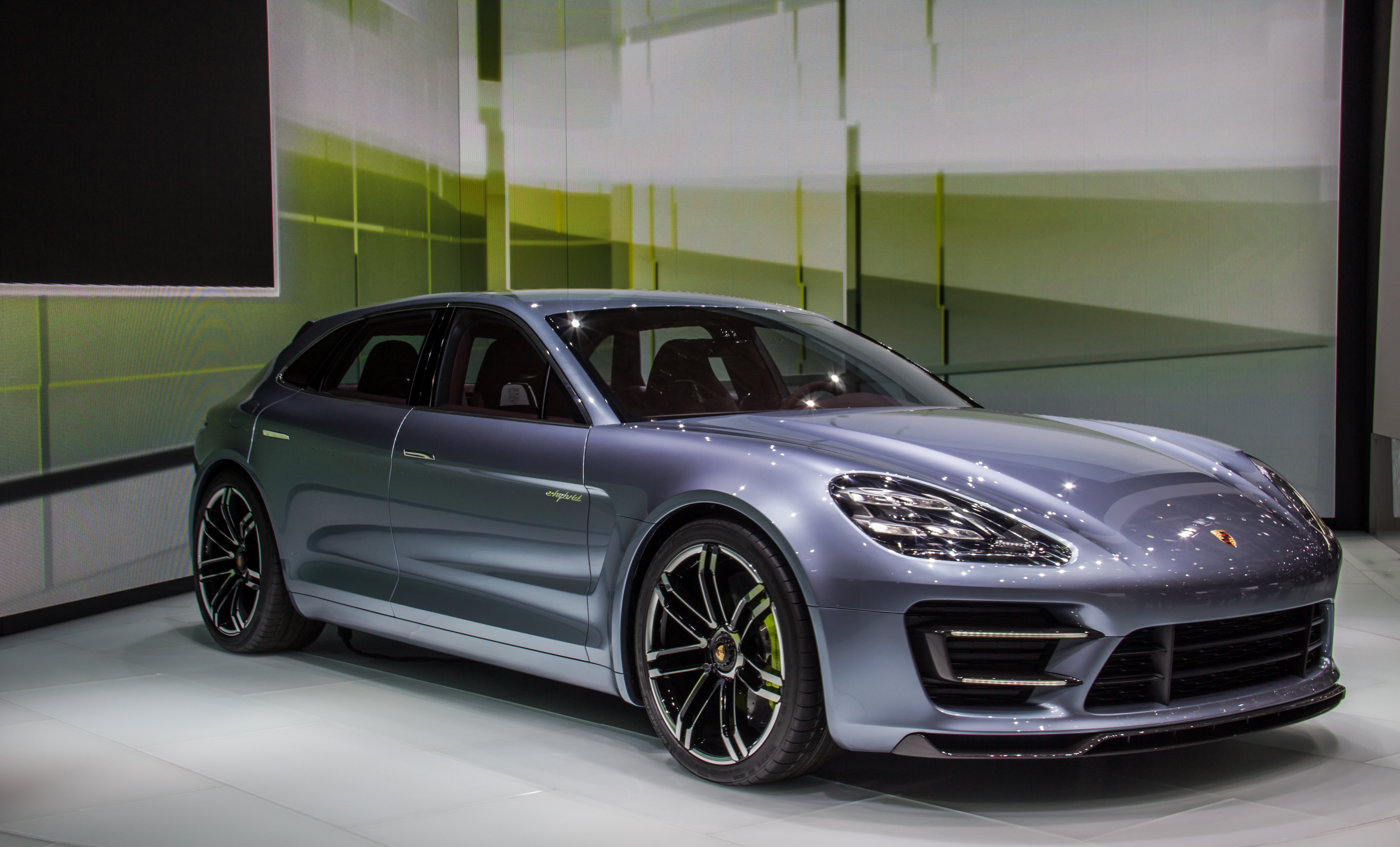

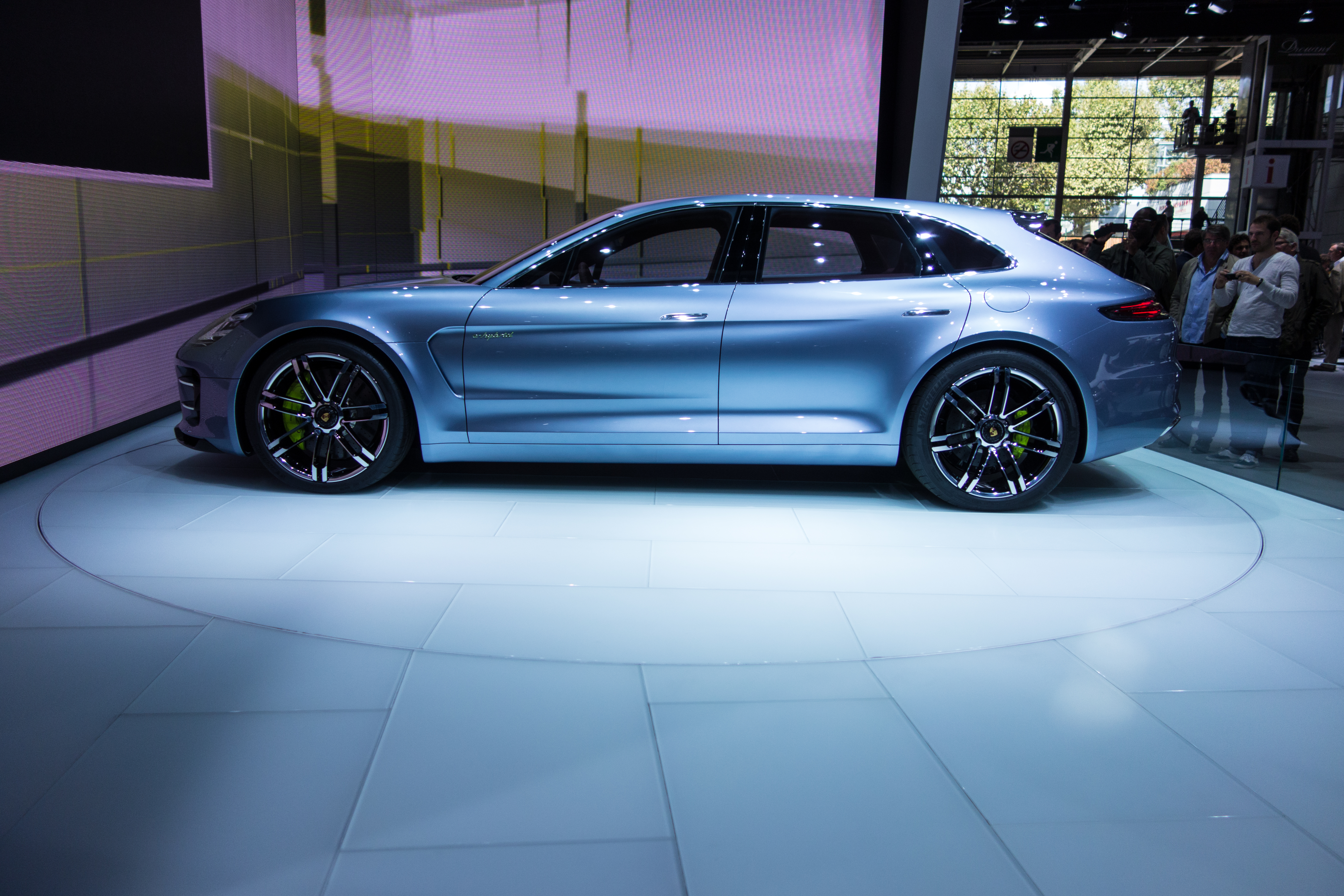

Porsche Panamera Sport Turismo at the 2012 Paris Motor Show.

On 20 April 2007, a spy video of the Porsche Panamera became available on the Internet.

In September 2008, Porsche released the first teaser image for the Panamera. In early October 2008, an undisguised Panamera was captured on film in Busan, South Korea.

On 28 November 2008, Porsche sent a mailer containing two photos of the Panamera which were labeled as "the first official images of the Porsche Panamera" with an invitation to have online access to Porsche USA's website.

On 19 April 2009, Porsche finally unveiled the Porsche Panamera sedan to the public at the 2009 Shanghai Auto Show. One of the highlights of the Panamera's debut was fitting the car in the freight elevator of the Shanghai World Financial Center and sending it to the skyscraper's 94th floor.

An estate version concept of the Panamera was introduced at the 2012 Paris Motor Show called Sport Turismo. Powered by an advancement of Porsche's current hybrid system utilized in the Panamera S Hybrid, the Sport Turismo concept's new "e-Hybrid" system uses the 333-horsepower, supercharged 3.0-litre V6 and a 95-horsepower electric motor for 416 combined horses and a 30-kilometer electric range. As opposed to the current production system, this e-Hybrid setup prioritizes all-electric motivation unless the driver instructs the car otherwise. The Sport Turismo is technically a plug-in hybrid since the lithium-ion battery pack can be fully charged in as little as 2.5 hours when plugged into a wall outlet. Porsche declares that the combined powertrain is proficient for 0–62 mph (100 km/h) acceleration in less than six seconds, and that the Sport Turismo can exceed 80 mph (129 km/h) while running purely on electric power.
