= List of Porsche vehicles =

The following is a list of Porsche vehicles, including past and present production models, as well as concept vehicles.

== Current models ==
Model	Calendar year introduced	Current model		Vehicle description	Logo
Model	Calendar year introduced	Introduction	Update/facelift	Vehicle description	Logo
Cayenne	2002	2018 (E3)	2023	Mid-size luxury crossover SUV.	Porsche Cayenne logo
Cayenne	2002	2026 (E4)	—	Battery electric mid-size luxury crossover SUV.	Porsche Cayenne logo
Macan	2014	2024 (XAB)	—	Battery electric compact luxury crossover SUV.	Porsche Macan logo
911	1964	2019 (992)	2025	Rear-engine sports car.	Porsche 911 logo
Panamera	2010	2023 (976)	—	Mid/full-size luxury liftback sedan.	Porsche Panamera logo
Taycan	2019	2019	2024	Battery electric executive sedan and station wagon. Previewed by the 2015 Porsche Mission E concept.	Porsche Taycan logo

== Model chronology ==
The following are models sorted by year of introduction. Street-legal racing models of the 1950s and 1960s are included.

=== 1940s ===
- Porsche 356 (1948–1965)

=== 1950s ===
- Porsche 550 (1953–1957)
- Porsche 718 (1957–1962)

=== 1960s ===
- Porsche 904 (1963–1965)
- Porsche 911 (1964–present)
- Porsche 906 (1965–1966)
- Porsche 912 (1965–1969, 1976)
- Porsche 914 (1969–1976)

=== 1970s ===
- Porsche 930 (1974–1989)
- Porsche 924 (1976–1988)
- Porsche 928 (1977–1995)

=== 1980s ===
- Porsche 944 (1981–1991)
- Porsche 959 (1986–1988, 1992–1993)

=== 1990s ===
- Porsche 968 (1992–1995)
- Porsche Boxster 986 (1996–2004)
- Porsche 911 GT1 Straßenversion (1996–1997)

=== 2000s ===
- Porsche Cayenne (2002–present)
- Porsche Carrera GT (2003–2007)
- Porsche Boxster and Cayman (2005–2016)
- Porsche Panamera (2009–present)

=== 2010s ===
- Porsche 918 Spyder (2013–2015)
- Porsche Macan (2014–present)
- Porsche 718 Cayman/Boxster 982 (2016–2025)
- Porsche Taycan (2019–present)

== Discontinued models ==
Porsche 356	Porsche 550	Porsche 718	Porsche 904	Porsche 906	Porsche 912	Porsche 914	Porsche 930
1948–1965	1953–1957	1957–1962	1963–1965	1965–1966	1965–1969, 1976	1969–1976	1974–1989
Porsche 356 C		Porsche 718	Porsche 904	Porsche 906 Carrera 6	Porsche 912	Porsche 914	Porsche 930 Turbo

Porsche 924	Porsche 928	Porsche 944	Porsche 959	Porsche 968	Porsche 911 GT1 Straßenversion	Porsche Carrera GT	Porsche 918 Spyder
1976–1988	1977–1995	1981–1991	1986–1988, 1992–1993	1991–1995	1996–1997	2003–2007	2013–2015
Porsche 924	Porsche 928	Porsche 944	Porsche 959	Porsche 968	Porsche 911 GT1 Straßenversion	Porsche Carrera GT	Porsche 918 Spyder

== Concept models ==
Porsche 356/1	Porsche Typ 754 T7 (695)	Porsche 901	Porsche Tapiro	Porsche 916	Porsche 969	Porsche Gruppe B	Porsche 984	Porsche 989
1948	1961	1963	1970	1971	1982	1983	1984-87	1988–91
Porsche 356 Roadster - 1948 Porsche No. 1	Porsche 754 T7 Prototype	Porsche 901 cabriolet prototype	placeholder image	Porsche 916	placeholder image	Porsche 959 Gruppe B Concept	placeholder image	Porsche 989 prototype

Porsche Panamericana	Porsche Boxster	Porsche C88	Porsche Carrera GT	Porsche 918 Spyder	Porsche 918 RSR	Porsche Boxster E	Porsche Panamera Sport Turismo
1989	1993	1994	2000	2010	2011	2011	2012
Porsche Panamericana Prototype	Porsche Boxster Concept	Porsche C88	Porsche Carrera GT Concept	Porsche 918 prototype	Porsche 918 RSR Concept	Porsche Boxster E Concept	Porsche Panamera Sport Turismo e-hybrid

Porsche Mission E	Porsche Mission E Cross Turismo	Porsche 911 Speedster (991.2)	Porsche Vision 357
2015	2018	2018	2023
Mission E	Mission E Cross Turismo	Porsche 911 Speedster Concept	Porsche Vision 357

== Historical models ==
=== 1898–1939 ===
Egger-Lohner C.2 Phaeton (Porsche P1)	Lohner–Porsche Semper Vivus	Lohner–Porsche Mixte-Wagen Hybrid	Porsche 64 (Type 60K10)
1898	1899–1906	1900/1902	1939
placeholder image	Lohner–Porsche Semper Vivus	Lohner–Porsche Mixte-Wagen	Porsche 64

== Racing models ==
=== Prototype Sports cars/Silhouettes ===
Porsche 550	Porsche 718	Porsche 904	Porsche 906	Porsche 910 Coupé	Porsche 910 Bergspyder	Porsche 907	Porsche 908 Coupé
1953–1957	1957–1962	1963–1965	1965–1966	1966–1968	1967–1968	1967–1968	1968–1971
Porsche 550 Spyder	Porsche 718	Porsche 904	Porsche 906	Porsche 910 Coupé	Porsche 910 Bergspyder	Porsche 907	Porsche 908 Coupé

Porsche 909 Bergspyder	Porsche 908 Spyder	Porsche 917	Porsche 936	Porsche 935/77 2.0	Porsche 935/78	Porsche 956	Porsche 962
1968	1969–1981	1968–1973	1976–1982	1977	1978	1982–1984	1984–1991
Porsche 909 Bergspyder	Porsche 908/3 Spyder	Porsche 917	Porsche 936	Porsche 935/77 2.0	Porsche 935/78	Porsche 956	Porsche 962C

Porsche 911 GT1	Porsche 911 GT1 Evo	Porsche 911 GT1-98 (9R1)	Porsche LMP1-98	Porsche LMP2000 (9R3)	Porsche RS Spyder (9R6)	Porsche 919 Hybrid (9R9)	Porsche 963 (9R0)
1996	1997	1998	1998	1998	2005–2010	2014–2018	2023–present
Porsche 911 GT1	Porsche 911 GT1 Evo	Porsche 911 GT1-98	Porsche LMP1-98	placeholder image	Porsche RS Spyder	Porsche 919 Hybrid	Porsche 963

=== Formula single-seaters ===
Porsche 360 Cisitalia	Porsche 718 F1/F2	Porsche 787 F1/F2	Porsche 804 F1	Porsche-Interscope Indycar	Porsche 2708 CART	Porsche 99X Electric (Gen2)	Porsche 99X Electric (Gen3)
1947	1957–1964	1960	1962	1980	1988–1990	2019–2022	2022–present
Cisitalia Porsche	Porsche 718 F1	placeholder image	Porsche 804 F1	placeholder image	Porsche 2708 CART	Formula E Gen2	Formula E Gen3

=== Grand Touring ===
Porsche 64 (Type 60K10)	Porsche 914-6 GT	Porsche 911 Carrera RSR 3.0	Porsche 934	Porsche 935	Porsche 924/944 Carrera GTP (939)	Porsche 924 Carrera GTR (939)	Porsche 924 Carrera GTS Clubsport (937)
1939	1970–1972	1974	1976–1977	1976–1981	1980–1981	1981	1981
Porsche 64	Porsche 914-6 GT	Porsche 911 Carrera RSR 3.0	Porsche 934	Porsche 935	Porsche 924/944 Carrera GTP	Porsche 924 Carrera GTR	Porsche 924 Carrera GTS

Porsche 961	Porsche 944 Turbo Cup (951)	Porsche 911 Cup (964)	Porsche 911 Carrera RSR 3.8 (964)	Porsche 911 Cup 3.8 (993)	Porsche 911 GT2 (993)	Porsche 911 GT2 Evo (993)	Porsche 911 Cup 3.8 RSR (993)
1986–1987	1986–1990	1990–1993	1993–1994	1994–1997	1995–1997	1995–2000	1997–1998
Porsche 961	Porsche 944 Turbo Cup (951)	Porsche 911 Cup (964)	placeholder image	Porsche 911 Cup 3.8 (993)	Porsche 911 GT2	placeholder image	Porsche 911 Cup 3.8 RSR (993)

Porsche 911 GT3 Cup (996)	Porsche 911 GT3 R (996)	Porsche 911 GT3 RS (996)	Porsche 911 GT3 Cup (996.2)	Porsche 911 GT3 RSR (996.2)	Porsche 911 GT3 Cup (997)	Porsche 911 GT3 RSR (997)	Porsche 911 GT3 Cup S (997)
1998–2001	1999–2003	2001–2005	2002–2004	2004–2006	2005–2010	2006–2010	2008–2010
Porsche 911 GT3 Cup (996)	placeholder image	Porsche 911 GT3 RS (996)	Porsche 911 GT3 Cup (996.2)	Porsche 911 GT3 RSR (996.2)	Porsche 911 GT3 Cup (997)	Porsche 911 GT3 RSR (997)	Porsche 911 GT3 Cup S (997)

Porsche 911 GT3 Cup 3.8 (997.2)	Porsche 911 GT3 R (997.2)	Porsche 911 GT3 R Hybrid (997.2)	Porsche 911 GT3 RSR (997.2)	Porsche 911 GT3 Cup (991)	Porsche 911 GT America (991)	Porsche 911 RSR (991)	Porsche 911 GT3 R (991)
2009–2013	2010–2013	2010–2011	2011–2012	2013–2017	2014	2014–2017	2015–2018
Porsche 911 GT3 Cup 3.8 (997.2)	Porsche 911 GT3 R (997.2)	Porsche 911 GT3 R Hybrid (997.2)	Porsche 911 GT3 RSR (997.2)	Porsche 911 GT3 Cup (991)	placeholder image	Porsche 911 RSR (991)	Porsche 911 GT3 R (991)

Porsche Cayman GT4 Clubsport (981)	Porsche 911 GT3 Cup (991.2)	Porsche 911 RSR (991.2)	Porsche 935 (991.2)	Porsche 911 GT3 R (991.2)	Porsche 911 GT2 RS Clubsport (991.2)	Porsche 718 Cayman GT4 Clubsport (982)	Porsche 911 RSR-19 (991.2)
2016–2018	2017–2020	2017–2019	2018–2019	2019–2023	2019–present	2019–present	2019–2023
Porsche Cayman GT4 Clubsport	Porsche 911 GT3 Cup (991.2)	Porsche 911 RSR (991.2)	Porsche 935 (991.2)	Porsche 911 GT3 R (991.2)	Porsche 911 GT2 RS Clubsport at Geneva International Motor Show 2019, Le Grand-Saconnex	placeholder image	Porsche 911 RSR-19 (991.2)

Porsche 911 GT3 Cup (992)	Porsche 911 GT3 R(992)
2021–present	2021–present
Porsche 911 GT3 Cup (992)	Porsche 911 GT3 R(992)

=== Rally ===
Porsche 911 Carrera SC 3.2 4x4 ‘Paris Dakar’ (953)	Porsche 959 Dakar
1984	1985
Porsche 953	Porsche 959 Dakar

== Tractors ==
- Porsche 110
- Porsche A 133
- Porsche AP Series (Allgaier AP) (AP16, AP17, AP22)
- Porsche Junior (4, 108, 109) (1952–1963)
- Porsche Master (408, 409, 418, 429)
- Porsche P 111
- Porsche P 122
- Porsche P 133
- Porsche P 144
- Porsche R22 (Allgaier R22) (1949–1952)
- Porsche Standard (208, 217, 218, 219, 238, AP, AP/S)
- Porsche Super (308, 309, 312, 318, 329, 339) (1956–1963)

== See also ==
- List of automobiles
- List of Porsche engines
- Porsche type numbers
