= Shift pattern =

Shift pattern may refer to:

- the layout of gears on a vehicle's gear stick
- the pattern of working shifts in shift work
