= RWB =

RWB may refer to:

- "Red, white & blue", the colors of the Flag of the United States
- Red Wanting Blue, an American indie rock group
- Reporters Without Borders
- Resorts World Bhd, subsidiary of Genting Bhd that manages a casino resort in Pahang, Malaysia
- Royal Winnipeg Ballet
- Royal Wootton Bassett, a town in Wiltshire, UK
- RAUH-Welt BEGRIFF, a Japanese tuning-company started by Akira Nakai
- Right wing-back, a position in association football
