= Akira Nakai =

Japanese car tuner

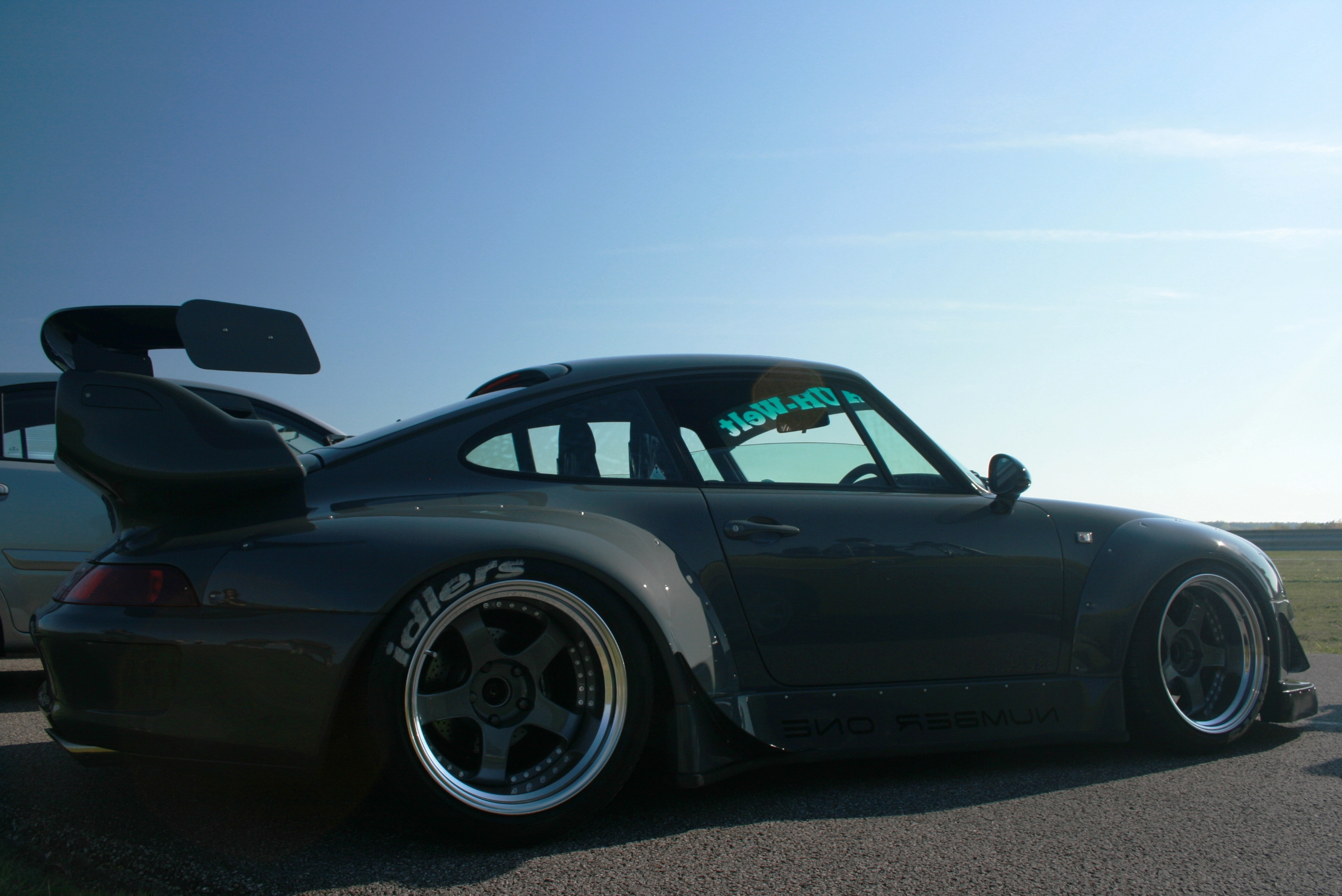
One of Nakai's modified Porsches with an RWB signature double wing

Akira Nakai (Japanese: 中井 啓, Hepburn: Nakai Akira) is a Japanese automotive tuner, founder of Porsche aftermarket tuning company RAUH-Welt BEGRIFF (RWB), who specializes in the design and installation of custom wide-body kits for classic and modern Porsche models.

Earlier examples sported a sticker German: "Sekund Entwicklung" on the back, which was later changed to German: "Zweite Entwicklung", lit. '"second development"' to fix a German language mistake.

== Life and career ==
=== Early life ===
Born on October 19, 1970, in Chiba, Japan, Akira Nakai became attracted to cars at a young age. He was inspired by American race car movies such as Gone in 60 Seconds and The Cannonball Run which influenced him to take up an automotive career.

=== Career ===
Nakai started his career with a drift crew called Rough World, working on a Trueno AE86, stretching the limits of what the car could bear. He started to work on Porsches while employed by a body shop when he came across a damaged Porsche 911 Turbo, which he bought off its original owner, with it later becoming the first RWB Porsche, named 'Stella Artois' after his preferred beer in the late 90s. This spark of interest, along with a little personal touch, is what led Nakai to create his Stella Artois inspired Porsche and many similar projects.

=== Company ===
Nakai later started his own company called RAUH Welt BEGRIFF (which means Rough World Concept) and eventually became known for modifying Porsches, giving them oftentimes extreme body alterations. His usual modifications include a new front bumper, rear bumper, side skirts, wheel arches and spoilers. In addition, he offers several options such as new fenders of various widths, suspension adjustments and smaller aesthetic additions, like canards and special rivets. The track width of the "RWB" Porsches is particularly widened. Nakai's and his company's modifications are said to have reached a "cult status" and his aesthetics are described as "singular".

=== In popular culture ===
Nakai appeared as himself in the 2015 video game Need for Speed as the "Build Icon",. The widebody kits designed by him were available for players to use on select Porsche models, and his "Stella Artois" custom Porsche 911 Turbo could be earned in-game.

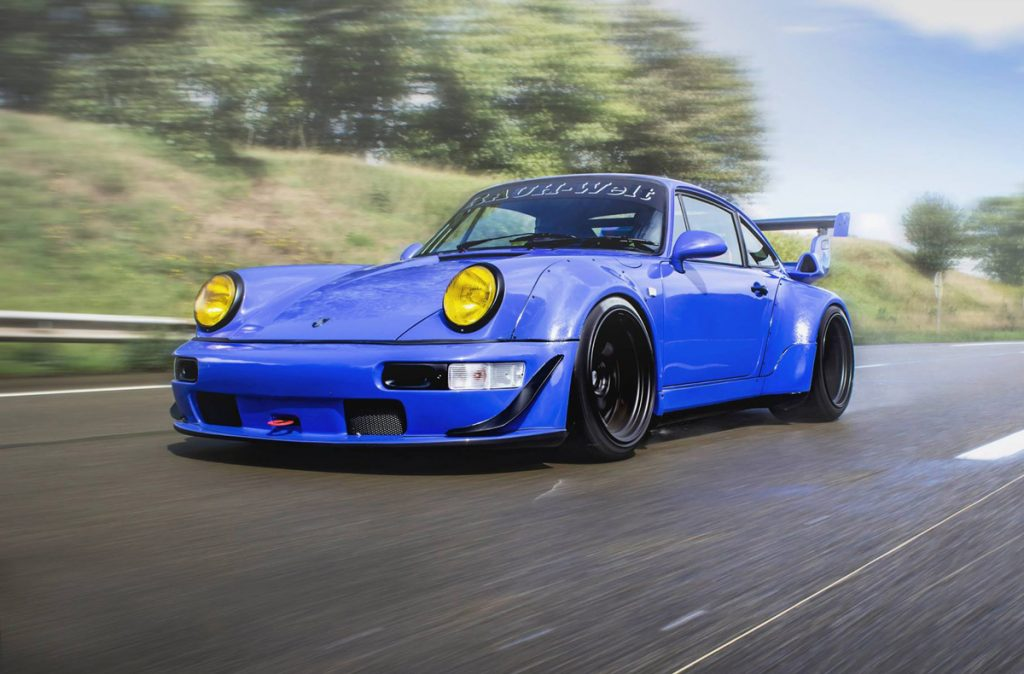
One of Nakai's completed projects, named RWB Champagne, after where it was built in Champagne, France

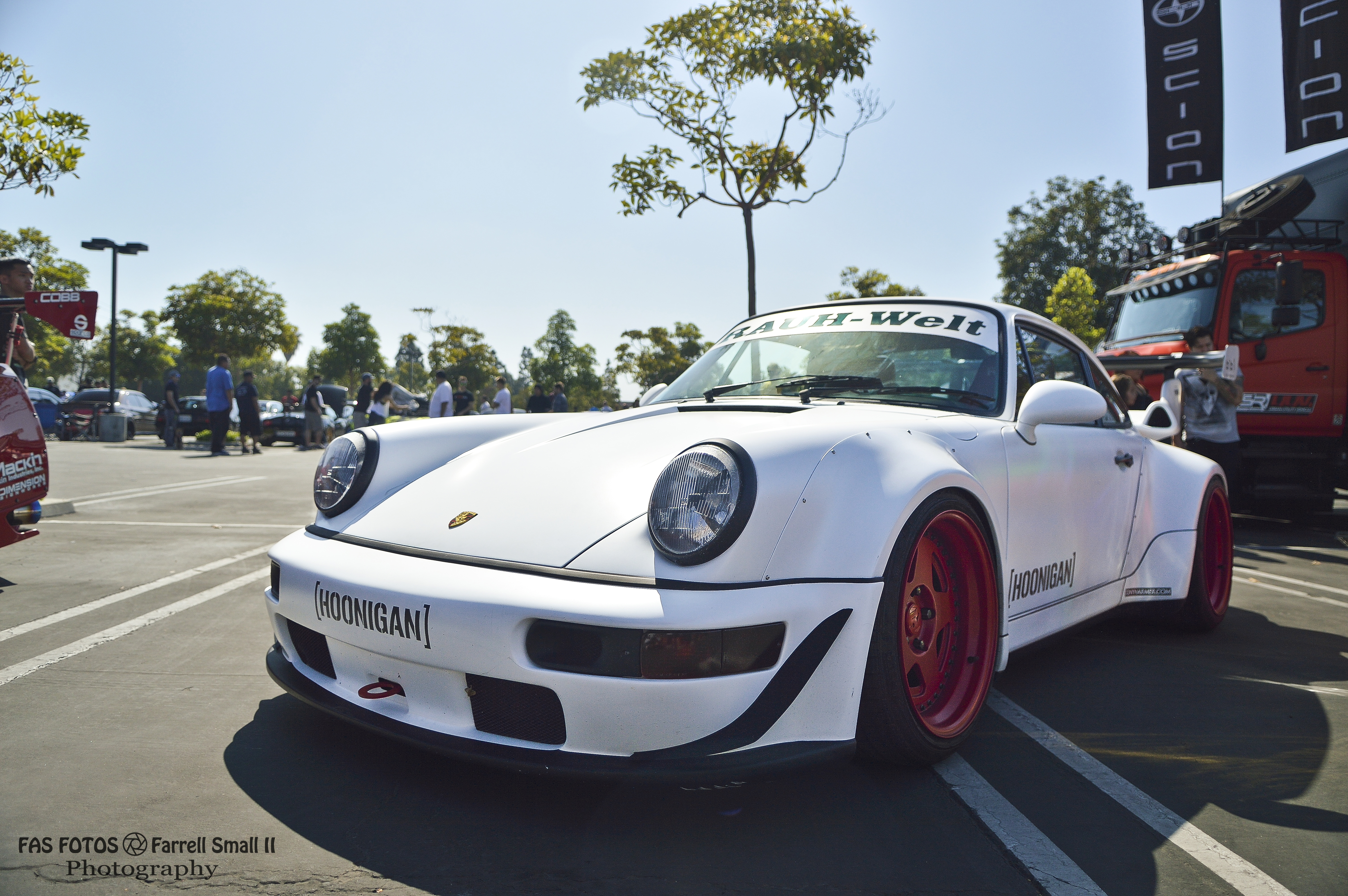
RWB Hoonigan, based on a Porsche 964 and built for Brian Scotto, the co-founder of Hoonigan

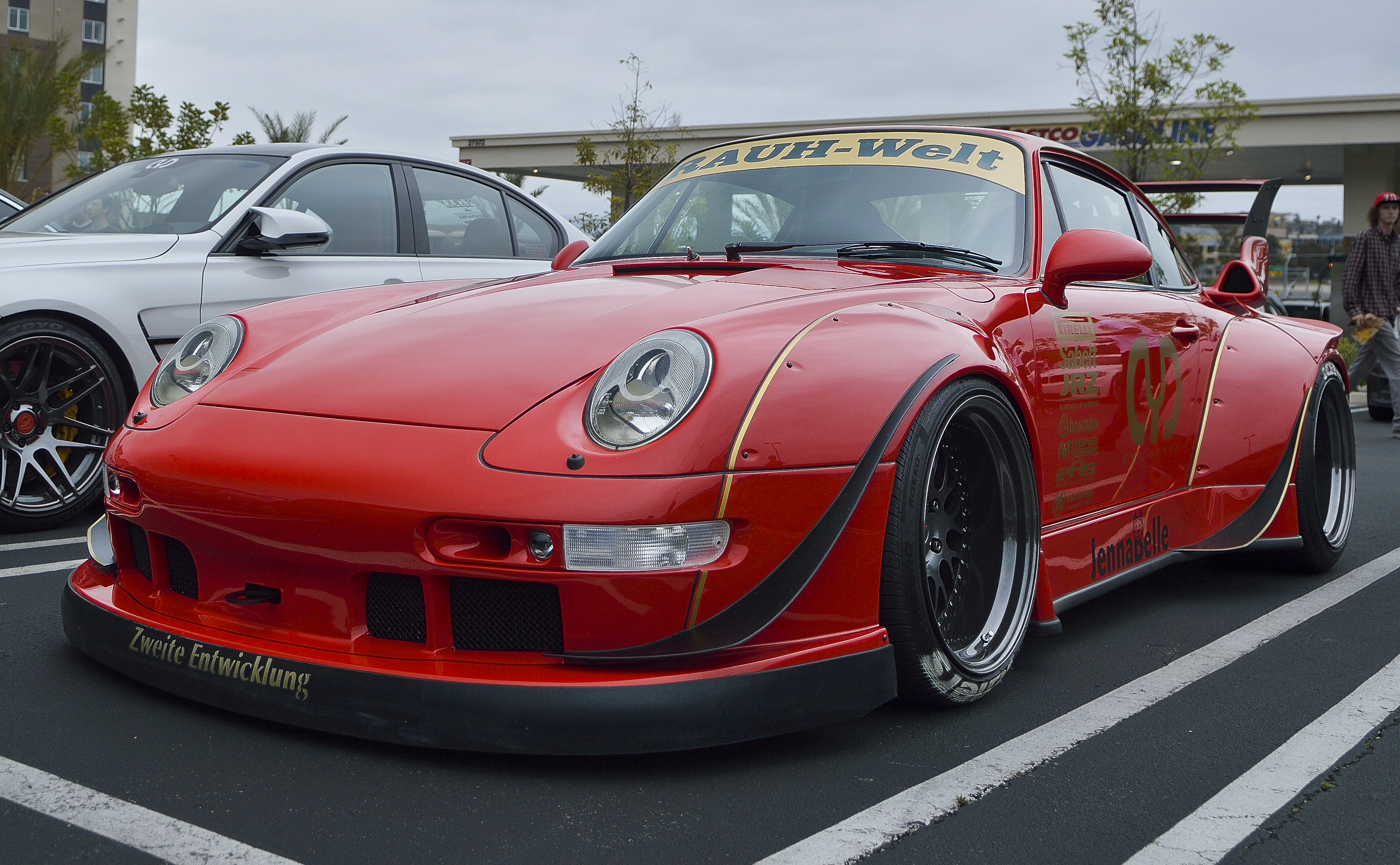
Another RWB project based on a Porsche 993

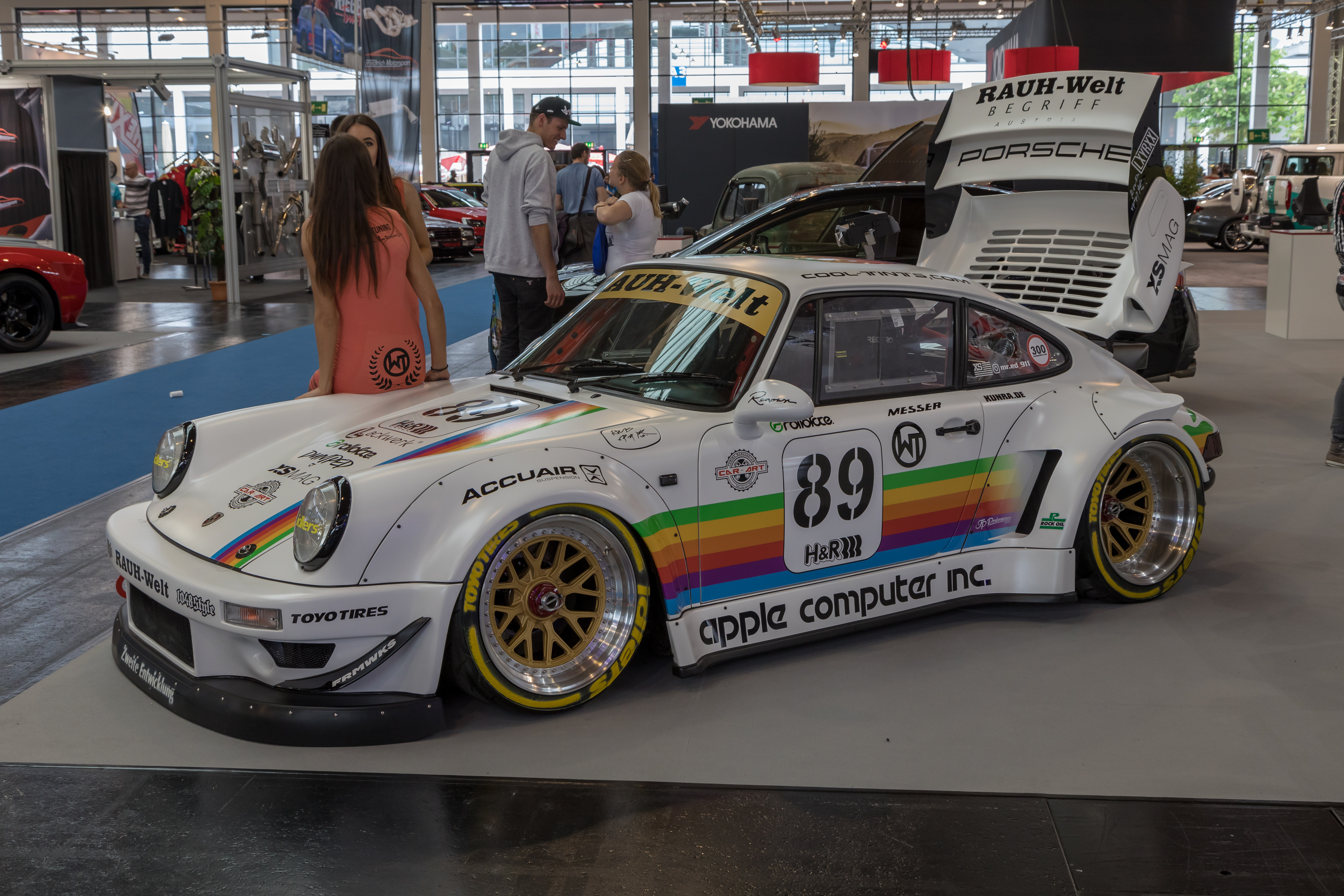
RWB Porsche 964 with a livery paying tribute to Bob Garretson's Apple Computer-sponsored Kremer 935 K3 that raced in the 1980 World Sportscar Championship
