= Gear stick =

Lever used for shifting gears manually

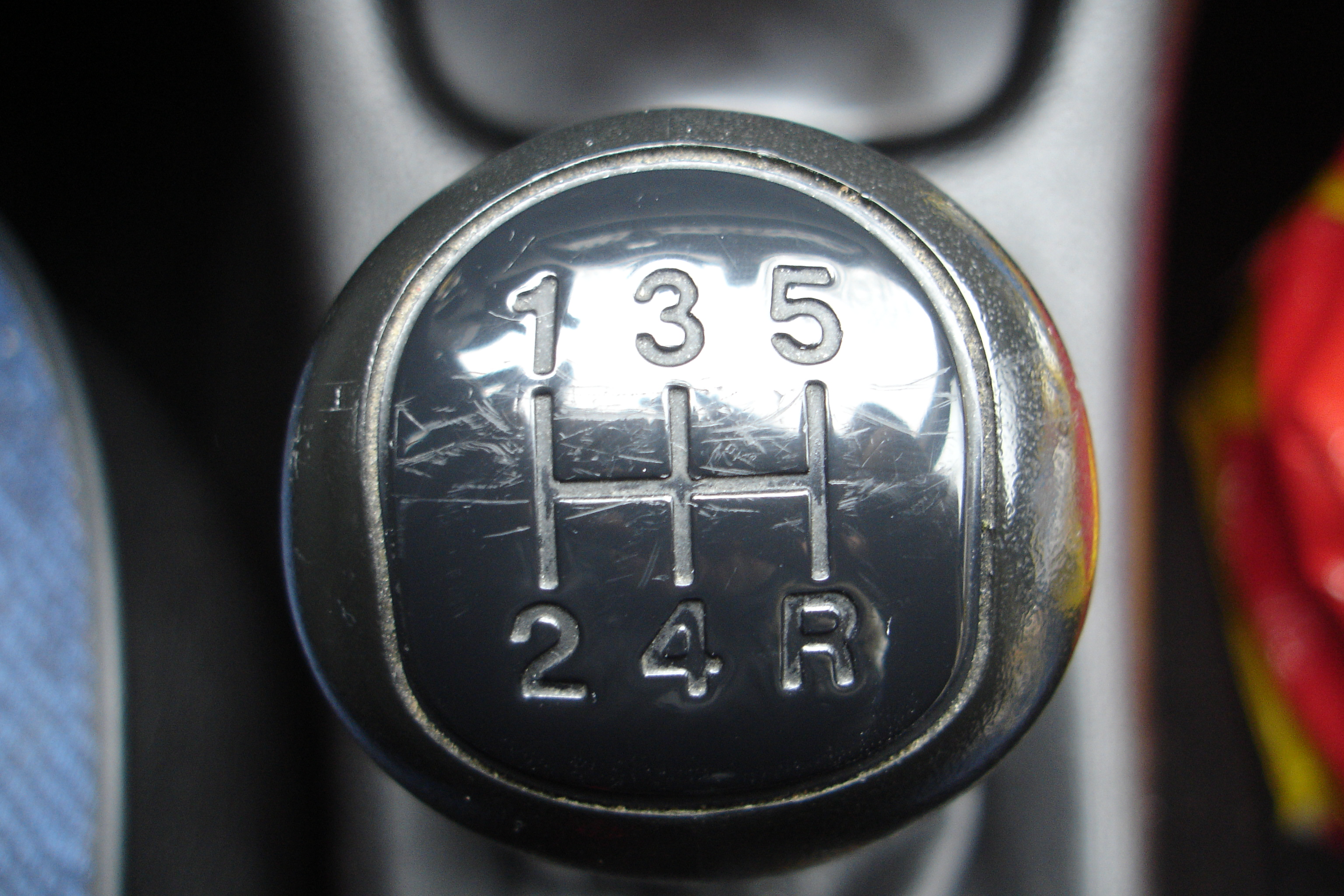
A common 5-speed shift pattern (on a Peugeot 206 knob)

A gear stick (Note: Called a gear stick, gearstick, or gear lever in British English; a gearshift or shifter in American English; and a transmission lever in formal speech.) is a metal lever attached to the transmission of an automobile. The term gear stick mostly refers to the shift lever of a manual transmission; while, in an automatic transmission, a similar lever is known as a gear selector. A gear stick will normally be used to change gear whilst depressing the clutch pedal with the left foot to disengage the engine from the drivetrain and wheels. Automatic transmission vehicles, including hydraulic (torque converter) automatic transmissions, automated manual and older semi-automatic transmissions (specifically clutchless manuals), like VW Autostick, and those with continuously variable transmissions, do not require a physical clutch pedal.

== Alternative positions ==
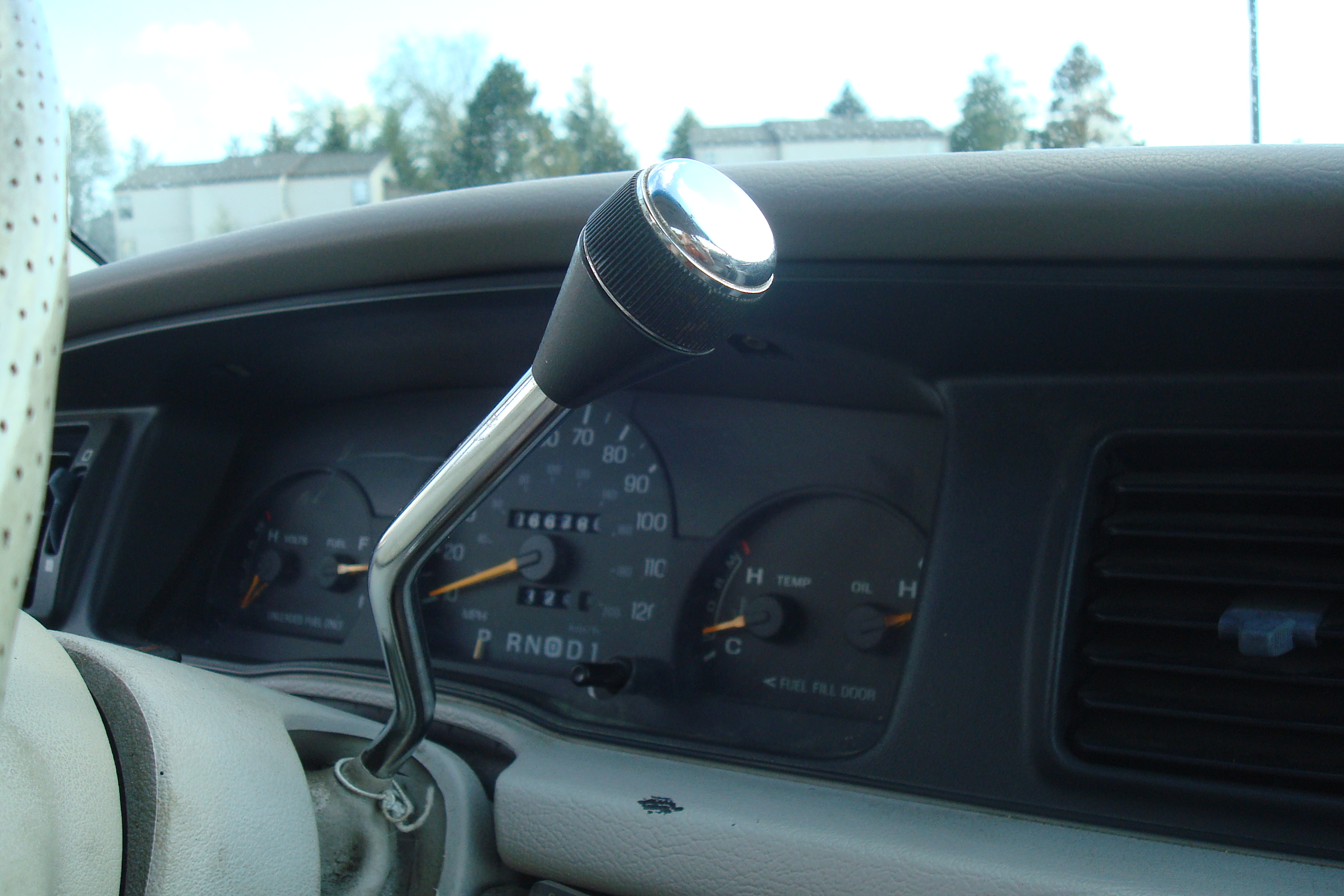
Column shifter for an automatic transmission in a Ford Crown Victoria

Gear sticks are most commonly found between the front seats of the vehicle, either on the center console (sometimes even quite far up on the dashboard), the transmission tunnel (erroneously called a console shifter when the floor shifter mechanism is bolted to the transmission tunnel with the center console to cover up the shifter assembly when used with a rear or front-wheel drive vehicle), or directly on the floor. Some vehicles have a column shift where the lever is mounted on the steering column – in vehicles with a manual four-speed gearbox such as 1950s Mercedes-Benz cars and all two-stroke Trabants, this is actually a manual gear lever connected to the gearbox with a linkage. In automatic transmission cars, the lever functions more like a gear selector, and, in modern cars, does not necessarily need to have a shifting linkage due to its shift-by-wire principle. It has the added benefit of allowing for a full-width bench-type front seat (though some models with bucket seating as an option include it). It has since fallen out of favor, although it can still be found widely on North American-market pick-up trucks, vans, emergency vehicles (both law enforcement and EMS – the column shifter is retained where a floor shifter is unfeasible due to mounting the mobile data terminal and 2-way radio), and "full-size" US sedans such as the Ford Crown Victoria. A dashboard mounted shift was common on certain French models such as the Citroën 2CV and Renault 4. Both the Bentley Mark VI and the Riley Pathfinder had their gear lever to the right of the right-hand drive driver's seat, alongside the driver's door, where it was not unknown for British cars to also have their handbrake. (Left-hand drive models received a column shift.)

In some modern sports cars, the gear lever has been replaced entirely by "paddles", which are a pair of levers, usually operating electrical switches (rather than a mechanical connection to the gearbox), mounted on either side of the steering column, where one increments the gears up, and the other down. Formula 1 cars used to hide the gear stick behind the steering wheel within the nose bodywork before the modern practice of mounting the "paddles" on the (removable) steering wheel itself.

== Gear knob and switches ==
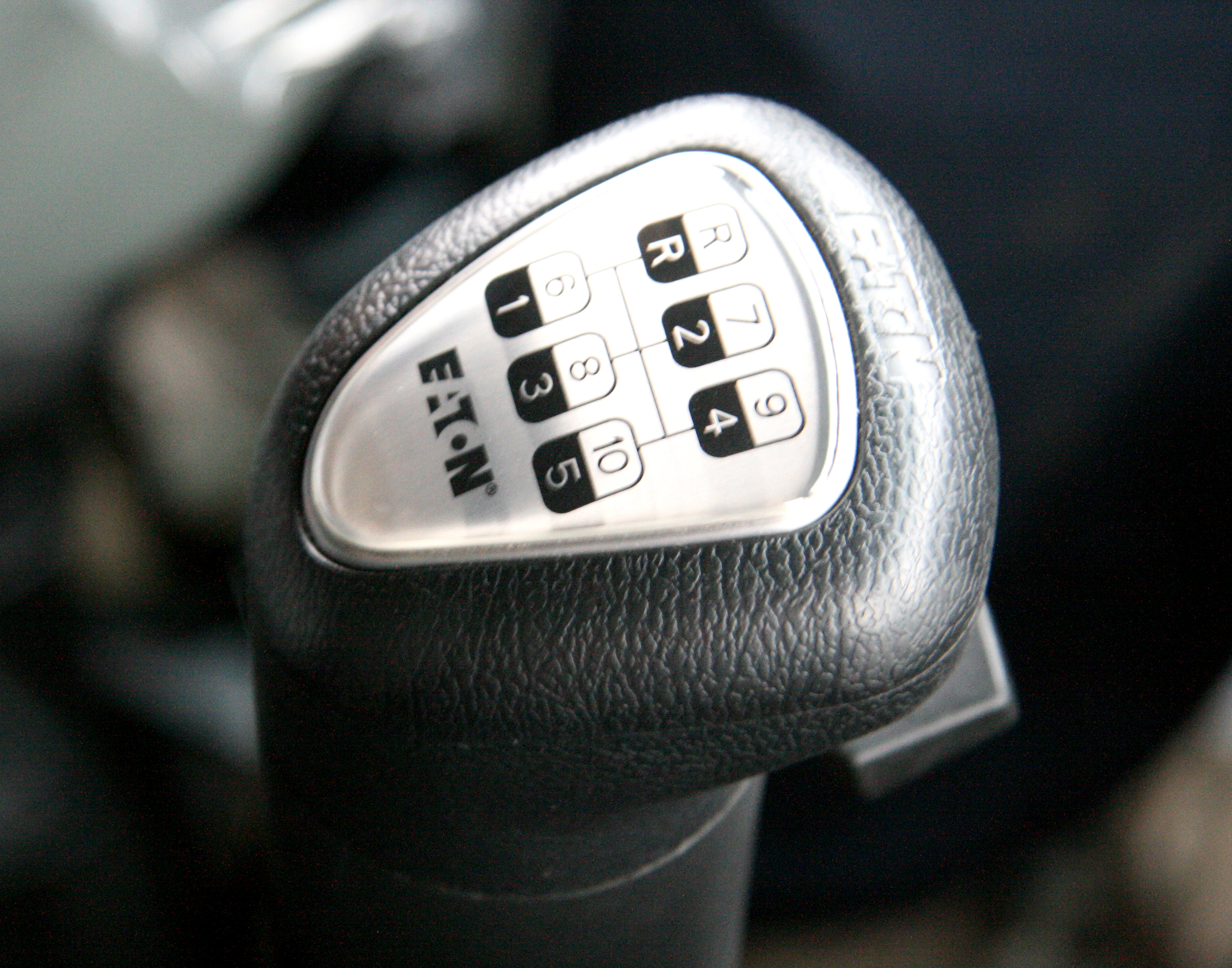
Gear shifter for a 10-speed Eaton-Fuller Roadranger non-synchronous transmission

A knob, variously called gear knob, shift knob, gear shift knob or stick shift knob, forms the handle for the gear stick. Gear knobs are commonly made from materials such as aluminum, plastic, leather, wood, or carbon fiber, depending on the vehicle type and desired aesthetics. Typically the gear knob includes a diagram of the shift pattern of the gear selection system, i.e. the positions to which the gear stick should be moved when selecting a gear. In some older manual transmission vehicles, the knob may incorporate a switch to engage an overdrive; in some automatic transmission vehicles it may incorporate a switch to engage a special mode such as a sports mode or to disengage overdrive. Both of the above-mentioned switches may also be found on the console or on steering column stalks instead. Manual shifters on the steering column, if having only three forward speeds, are typically called a three on the tree, and floor shifters having four forward speeds, are called four-on-the-floor. The lowest of these gears, if set at a much lower ratio than a typical 1st-gear ratio, is often called a granny gear.

Starting the car in gear with the clutch engaged causes it to lurch forwards or backward since the starter motor by itself produces sufficient torque to move the whole vehicle; this can be highly dangerous, especially if the parking brake is not firmly applied and can be injurious to the starter and drivetrain. Therefore, novice drivers are taught to rock the knob of a manual gearbox from side to side before starting the engine to confirm that the gearbox is in neutral. For the same reason, modern cars require the clutch pedal to be depressed before the starter will engage (though some modern vehicles have a button that disables the clutch start requirement if held down when starting, for rare situations when starting the car in gear is necessary). The latter practice is also useful in extremely cold conditions or with a weak battery, as it avoids the starter motor also having to turn over a gearbox full of cold and highly viscous oil.

Many automatic transmission vehicles have extra controls on the gear stick, or very close by, which modify the choices made by the transmission system depending on engine and road speed, e.g. "sports" or "economy" modes which will broadly speaking allow, respectively, for higher and lower revolutions per minute, before shifting up.

Some specialist vehicles have controls for other functions on the gear stick. The Land Rover Freelander introduced a button for that company's Hill Descent Control system feature, which uses the brakes to simulate the function of a low-ratio gearbox in steep descents.

== Secondary gear levers ==
Conventional four-wheel drive vehicles have one or more additional "shift levers" to engage a low-ratio gearbox (used on tough terrain), a transfer case (which switches between two- and four-wheel drive), or differential locks. Some more modern conventional vehicles combine controls for the low-ratio gearbox and transfer case into one lever, with three positions: 2H (for two-wheel drive in the standard high-ratio gearbox); 4H (for four-wheel drive in the standard high-ratio gearbox); and 4L (for four-wheel drive in the low-ratio gearbox).

== Shift pattern ==
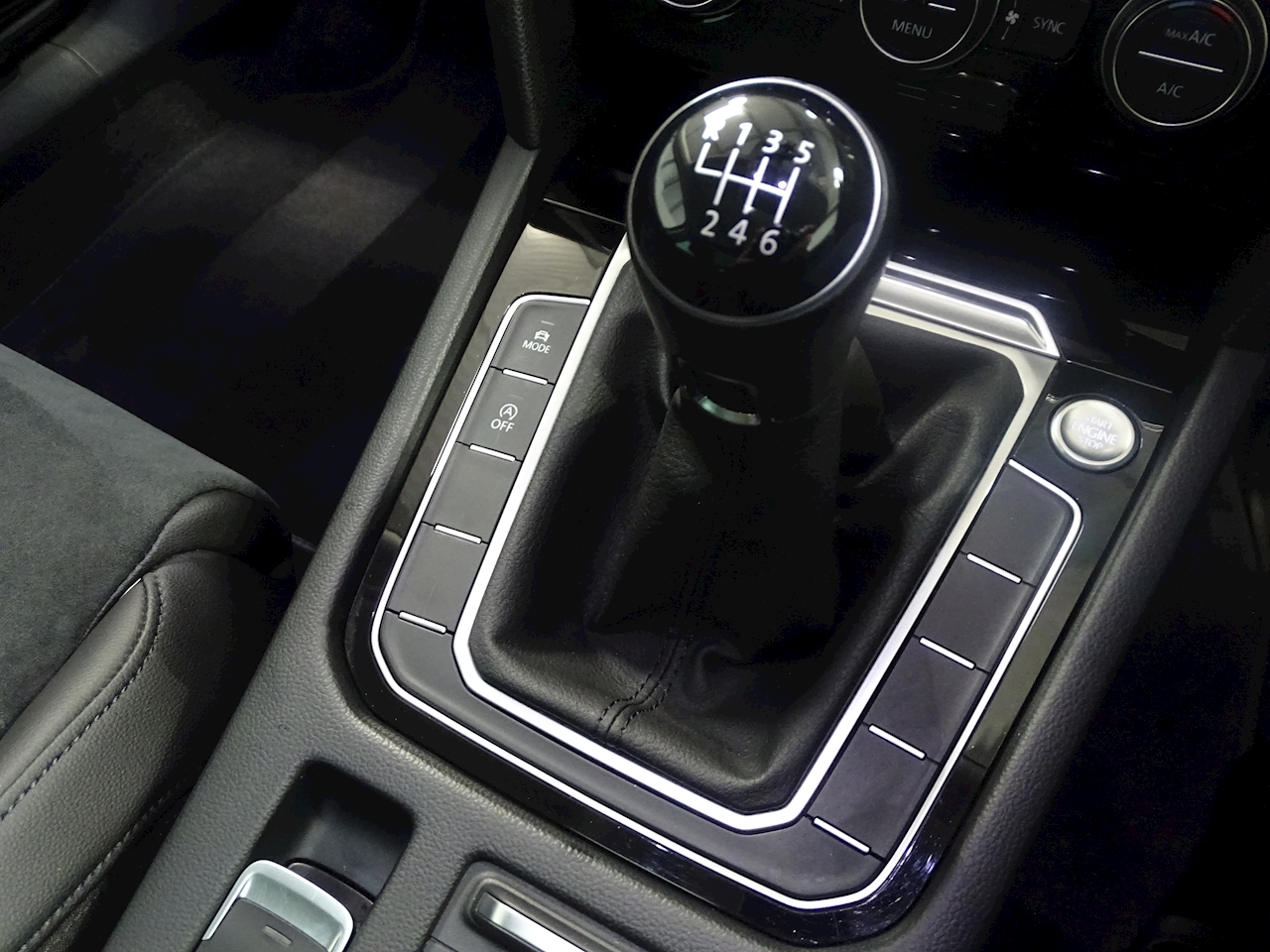
6-speed gear shifter in a 2015 Volkswagen Passat Estate

The shift pattern refers to the layout of the gears. In a typical manual transmission car, first gear is located to the left, and forwards. In many trucks and some sports cars it is instead in a "dog leg" position, to the left and rearwards. There is usually a spring-loading to return the stick to the central position. Reverse gear is commonly positioned in the best choice of location to avoid accidental engagement.

=== Manual transmission ===
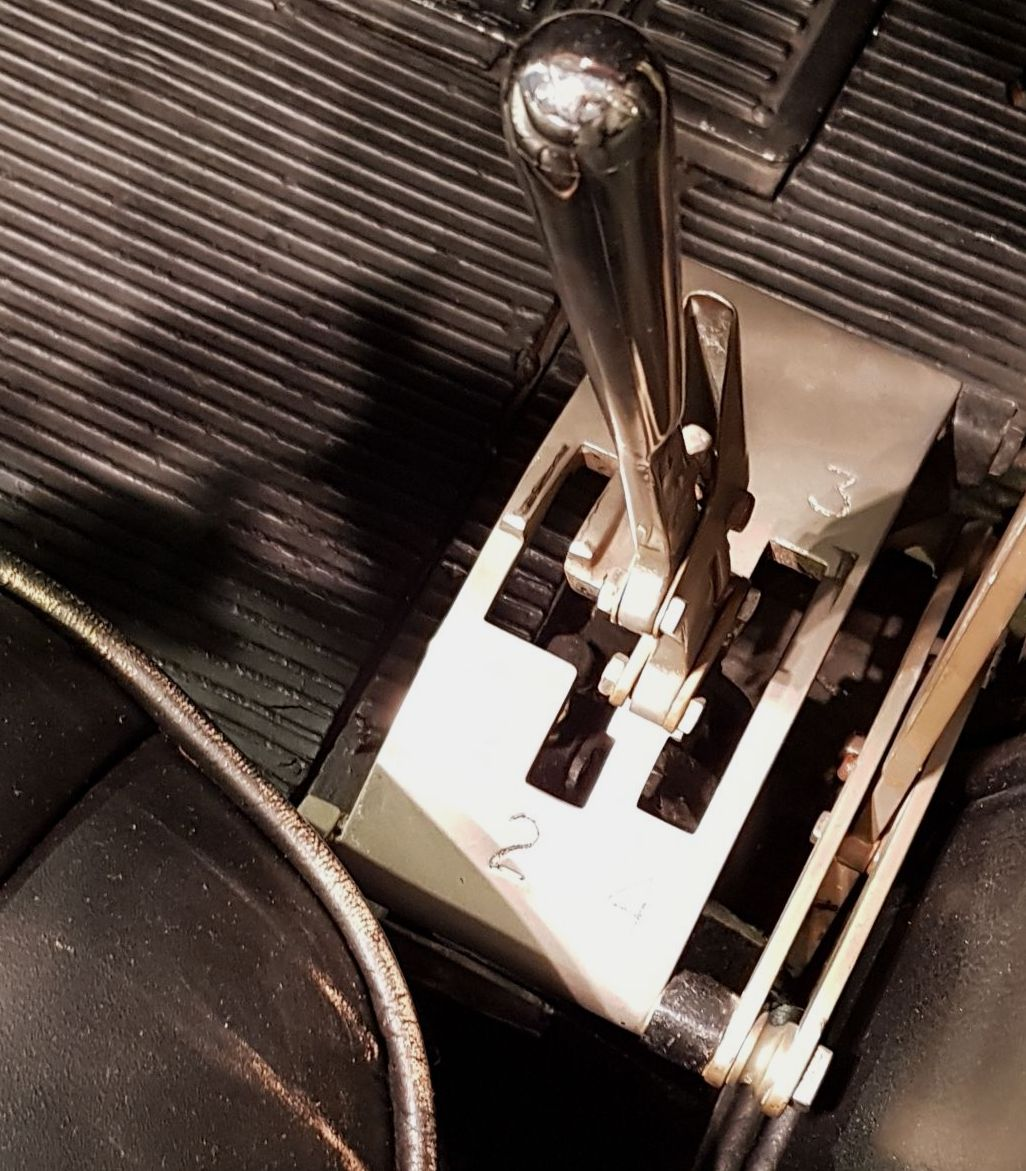
Gear stick of Rolls-Royce Phantom I Open Tourer Windovers (1926)

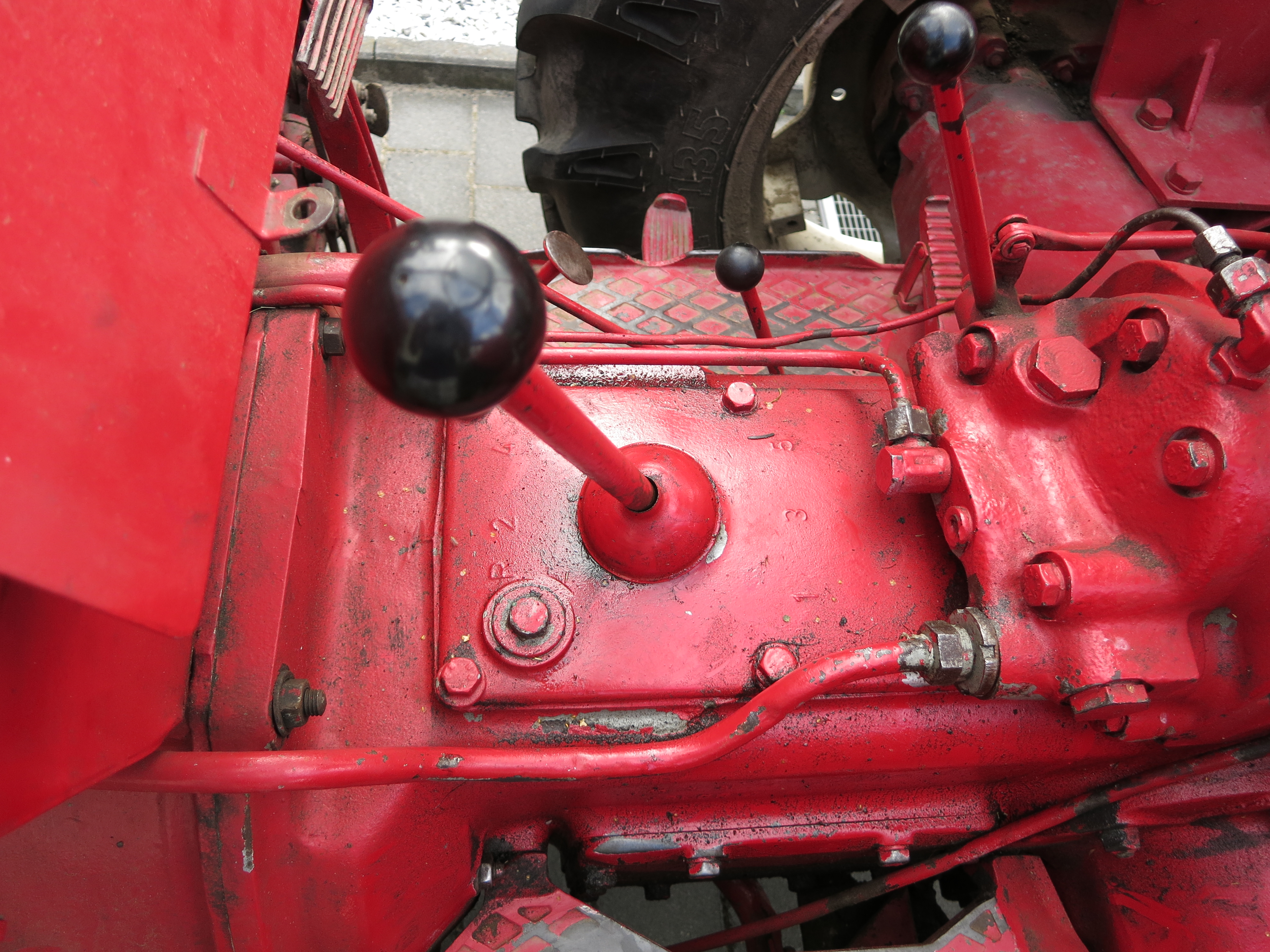
Dog-leg gear lever in a Porsche-Diesel 218 tractor (1959)

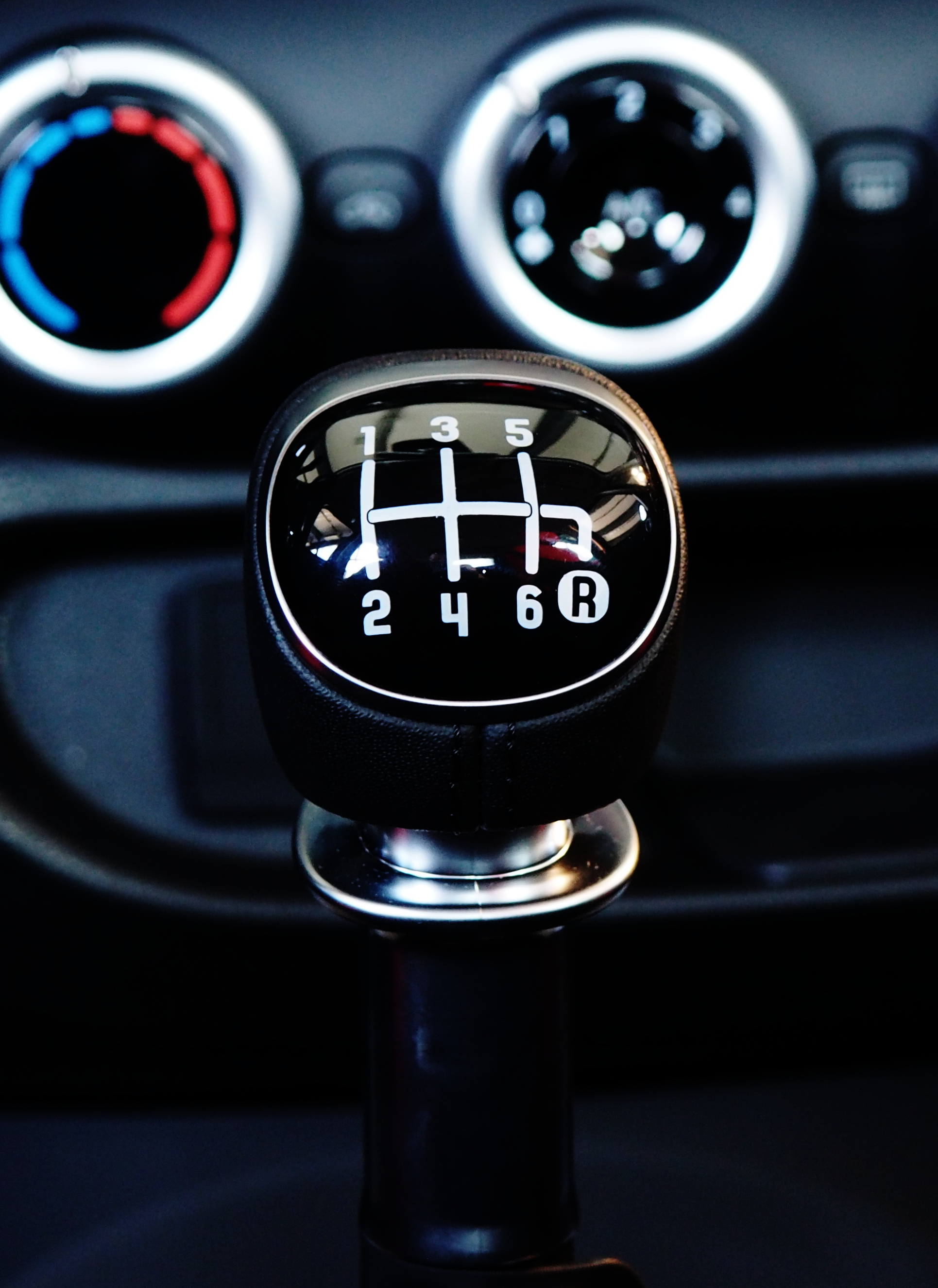
6-speed manual gear shift in a Fiat 500L

A typical manual transmission vehicle, with (for example) five forward gears, will thus have seven possible positions: the five forwards gears, reverse gear, and a central "neutral" position. Some vehicles have a special button to prevent accidental engagement of reverse. Others require that the lever be lifted (e.g. Nissan), pressed down (e.g. Volkswagen), or moved with extra force (e.g. BMW) to engage reverse. In transmissions with reverse directly below fifth, there may be a mechanical lock-out preventing selection of reverse other than from neutral, thus preventing a driver used to a six-speed transmission from engaging reverse while trying to select sixth. Some transmissions also have an electronically controlled error-prevention safeguard that blocks the first and sometimes the second gear from being selected if the vehicle is moving fast enough to exceed the engine's maximum RPM.

Common manual transmission shift patterns
Layout	Description
	RDR: Reverse Down Right This shift pattern was the most common five-speed shift pattern in the past. Peugeot and Citroën still use it, but not in all models. This layout is reasonably intuitive because it starts at the upper left and works left to right, top to bottom, with reverse at the end of the sequence and toward the rear of the car. Nowadays it has been mainly replaced by the second pattern on this list.
	RUL: Reverse Up Left This shift pattern is the most commonly used nowadays. A five-speed shift pattern which can be found in Saabs, BMWs, some Audis, Eagles, Volvos, Volkswagens, Škodas, Opels, Hyundais, most Renaults, some diesel Fords, most Holden/Vauxhalls and more. The placement of the reverse gear is to prevent the reverse gear from being selected accidentally while the vehicle is in motion, causing catastrophic damage to the transmission.
1  3  5 ___|__|__| |  |  |  R  2  4	RDL: Reverse Down Left This shift pattern is commonly used in Mercedes-Benz cars.
	This shift pattern, sometimes called a dog-leg shift pattern is used on many race cars and on older road vehicles with three-speed transmissions. The name derives from the up-and-over path between first and second gears. Its use is common in race cars and sports cars, but is diminishing as six-speed and sequential gearboxes are becoming more common. Having first gear across the dogleg is beneficial in performance driving contexts because first gear is traditionally only used for getting the car moving, hence allowing second and third gears to be aligned fore and aft of each other, which facilitates quick shifting between the two. As most racing gearboxes are non-synchromesh there is no appreciable delay when upshifting from first through the dogleg into second. This gear pattern can also be found on some heavy vehicles – such as lorries and tractors – in which first gear is an extra-low ratio for use in extreme standing-start conditions, and would see little use in normal driving.
	This shift pattern is a typical pattern for a six-speed transmission. Six speeds is the maximum usually seen in single range manual transmissions, however many semi-trucks and other large commercial vehicles have manual transmissions with 8, 16 or even 20 speeds, which is made possible due to multi-range gearboxes. In such a case, Reverse is placed outside of the "H," with a canted shift path, to prevent the shift lever from intruding too far into the driver's space (in left-hand drive cars) when reverse is selected. Higher number of speeds in automobiles are rare occurrences, although examples do exist, such as the eighth generation Porsche 911, which is equipped with a seven-speed manual transmission.
	Shift pattern for a 4-speed car. Also found in column shift (Citroën DS/ID and Peugeot 404 from September 1967 onwards). In some British vehicles, namely the Triumph Herald, reverse is on the opposite side (left-left-up not right-down).
	Shift pattern for a 3-speed car.
	Shift pattern for a 4-speed column shifter. Found like this in Peugeot 403 and 404 until September 1967.

=== Automatic transmission ===
Automatic transmissions traditionally have had a straight pattern, adopting the classic P-R-N-D gate, with "P" being to the front, topmost position (or "P" all the way to the left on a column-mounted shifter); the corresponding shift positions being:

- P = Park – transmission is mechanically locked in position for parking, via a parking pawl.
- R = Reverse – reverse motion
- N = Neutral – no drive applied to the wheels with the engine running
- D = Drive – forward motion with fully-automatic operation in all gears.

All automatics use some sort of manual override of the transmission, with numbered positions in descending order marked below (or to the right) of "drive", which will prevent the transmission shifting to a gear higher than the selected, but maintaining automatic operation between all lesser numbered gears. Such gates will appear as P-R-N-D-3-2-1 for example. On some vehicles (mainly Japanese makes such as Honda, Toyota, Subaru, and Lexus) these numbered positions are replaced by a single "L" (for "low") position, which will hold the transmission in whatever lower ratio is required for climbing steep grades or for heavy acceleration: P-R-N-D-L.

More modern automatic transmissions have employed a "J-gate" (pioneered by Jaguar) where some gears are on the left-hand "arm", some on the right, and there is a sideways movement at the rear of the pattern. The second-generation Range Rover from 1995 used an "H-gate", with two parallel PRND gates on the opposing legs of the "H" for both high range and low range ratios, for normal and off-road driving, respectively.

Most modern manumatics, such as Alfa Romeo's Sportronic and Porsche's Tiptronic, have a traditional automatic shift pattern on the left or right side of the gear selector, along with a connected longitudinal gate with "+" and "-" positions on the other side in which movement of the shifter forward and backward increments the gears up and down, respectively. This can be useful in snow or dirt conditions, where it may be necessary to start from second gear.

== Electronic gear shifts ==
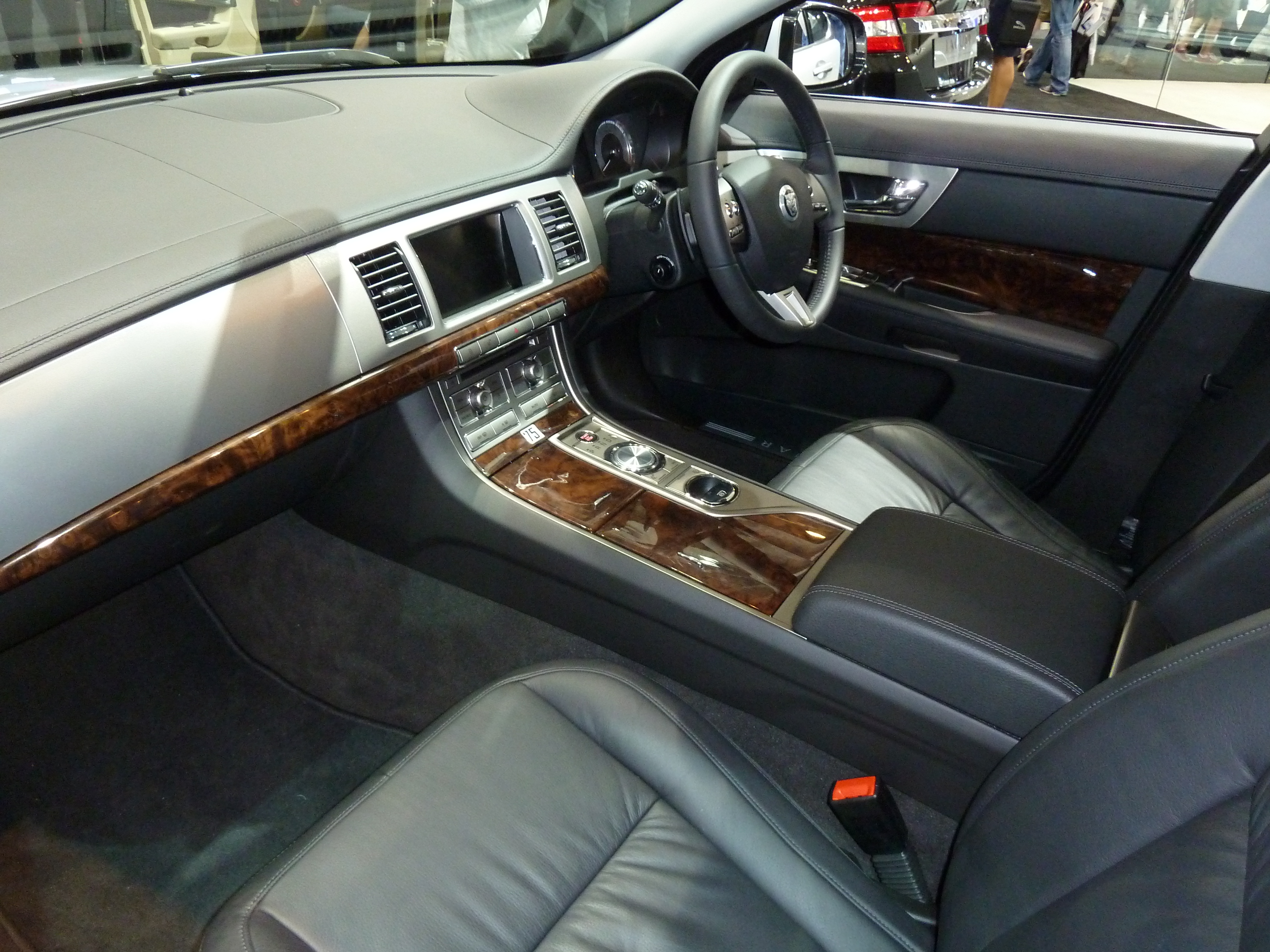
Interior of a 2010 Jaguar XF; with a rotary-knob-style gear selector on the central console

With the advent of drive by wire (or more properly, shift by wire) computer-controlled transmissions (particularly in the case of automatics), the gear stick no longer needs to be mechanically connected to the transmission unit itself, and can, therefore, be made much smaller since there is no need to package either remote mechanisms or complex interlocking arrangements. Electric cars (which generally have no actual gearbox or transmission in the traditional sense) use a 'drive selector' for the simple shift positions of Drive ("forward"), Neutral and Reverse, although some have an additional position "B" to engage regenerative braking and a separate button for "Park". The drive selector is usually prominent knob or switch in place of a lever, or in the case of Tesla vehicles - a steering column stalk switch which is often confused with the windscreen wiper control.

All this has allowed designers to replace the gear stick completely with either button, rotary knobs (current Jaguar, Land Rover and Ford models are good examples of this), or a miniaturized gear stick on the center console. This can be seen in some Audis, BMWs and the Lincoln Continental. Japanese finger shift is another example. It is a revival of an approach used in the 1950s by the Chrysler push-button PowerFlite and the Packard Touchbutton Ultramatic.

== Special knobs ==
A shift knob also known as a gear knob, gear shift knob and stick shift knob is the physical interface between the gear stick and the driver's hand. Made of many materials from simple plastics through to platinum, it comes in many shapes sizes and weights. OEM shift knobs are generally spherical in shape, often resembling a chess pawn when attached to the gear stick.

The shift knob's principal function is the ergonomical interface between driver and the manu. The gear stick, as the name implies, is often just a machined or cast aluminium or steel rod with or without threading the shift knob is fitted on its end.

In recent years, manufacturers have increased the variety of shifts knobs available to the consumer from inexpensive plastics to diamond-studded white gold.

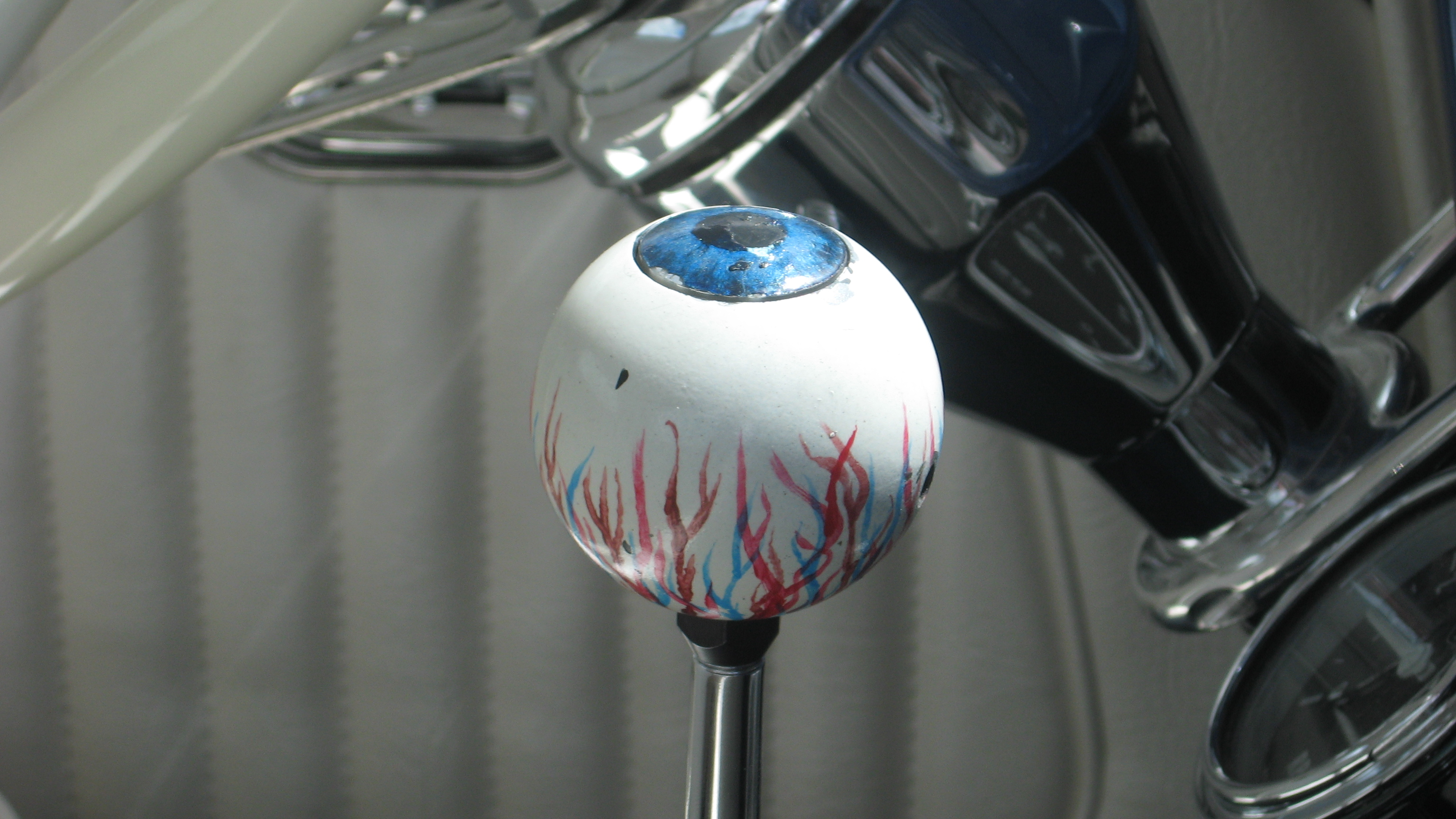
'Big Daddy' Ed Roth 'bloodshot eyeball' shift knob, a 1960s craze

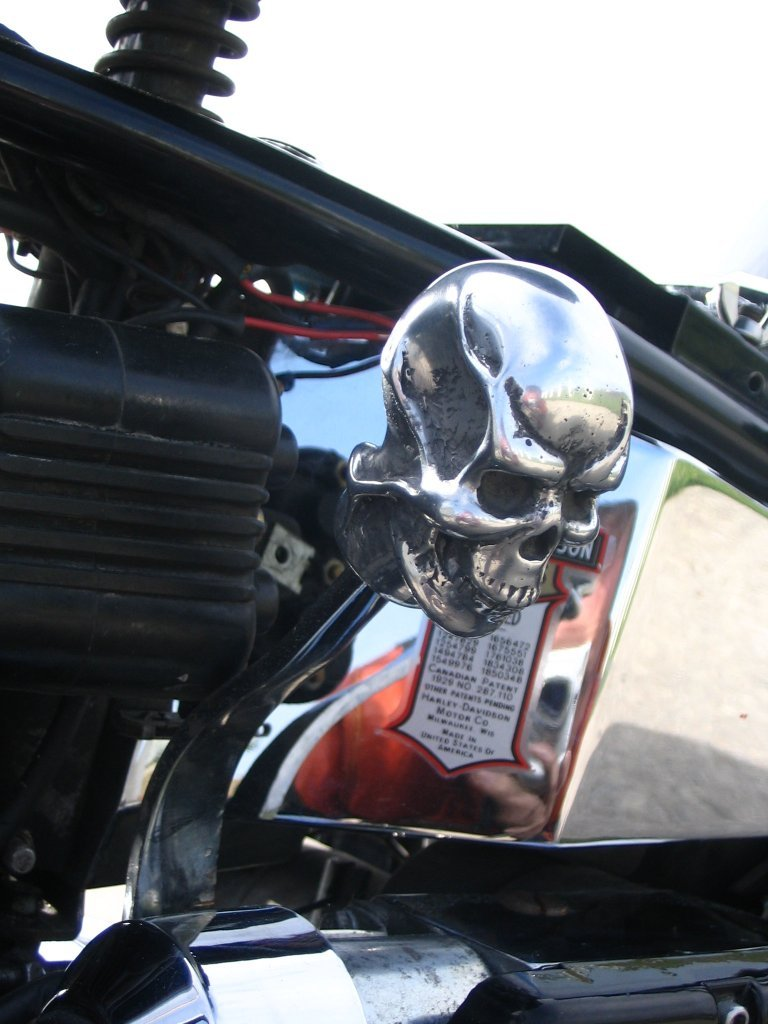
Stylized shift knobs can be found on many types of vehicles. This aluminum, hand made, skull shift knob is mounted on a vintage Harley Davidson Knucklehead's "jockey shifter".

== See also ==
- List of auto parts
