= Porsche Super =

Porsche farm tractor model

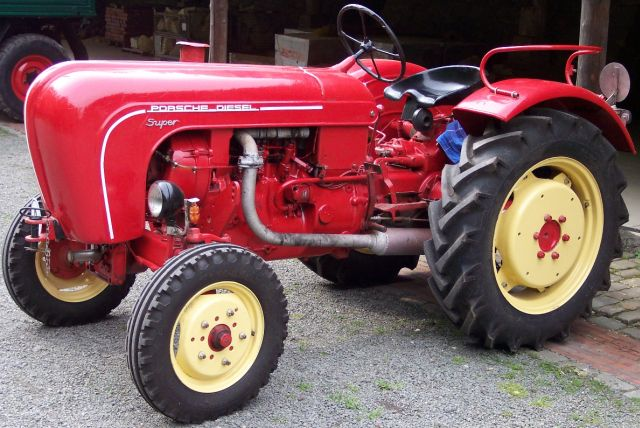
Porsche-Diesel Super

Porsche-Diesel Super is a tractor that was manufactured by Porsche between 1956 and 1963.

It is powered by an air-cooled, four-stroke, 2466 cc, three-cylinder diesel.
