= Porsche Junior =

Porsche farm tractor

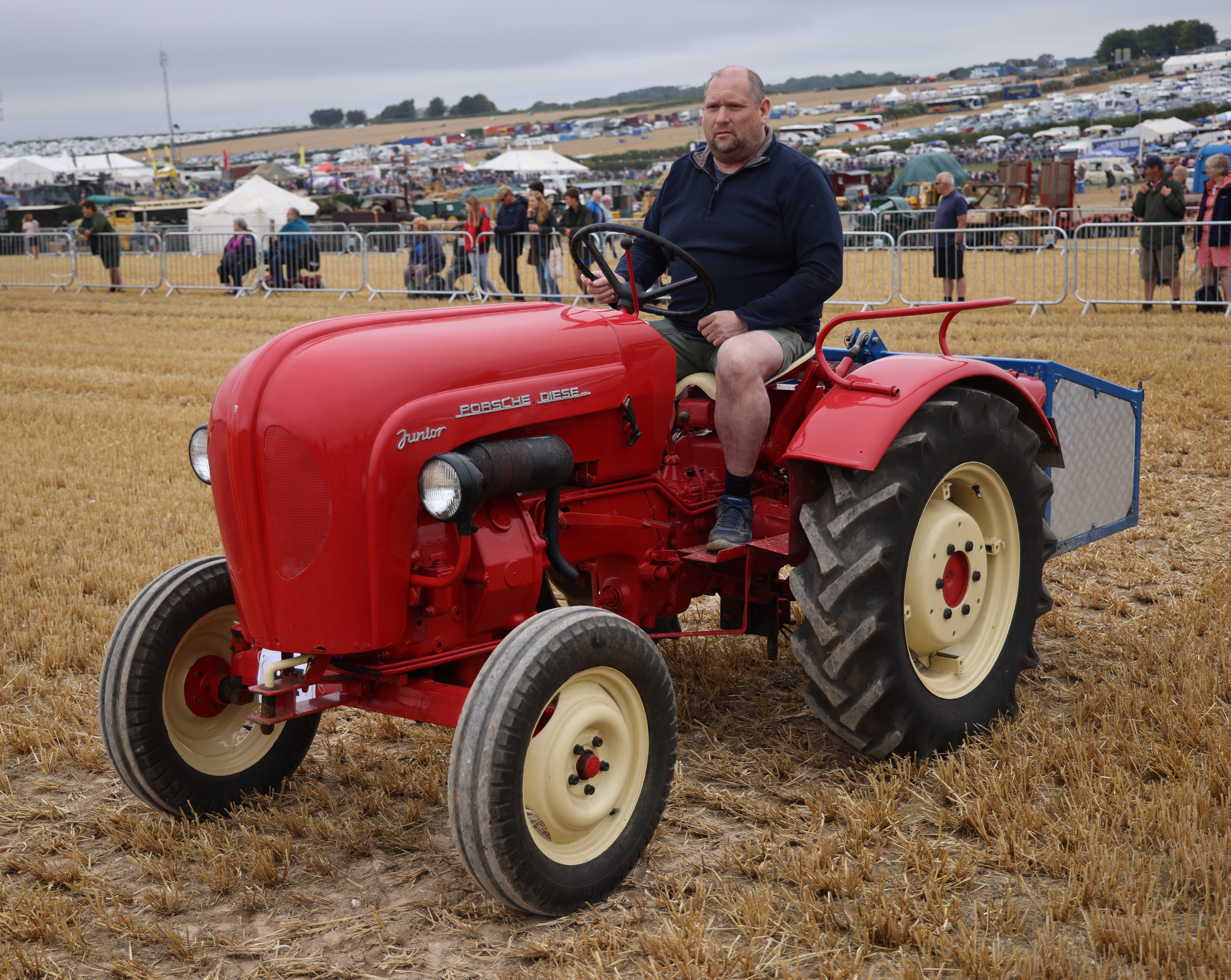
A 1960 Porsche-Diesel Junior

Porsche Junior is a tractor that was manufactured by Porsche-Diesel from 1952 to 1963. It is powered by an air-cooled 14 hp 822 cc, single-cylinder diesel engine.
