= Porsche-Diesel 218 =

Porsche-Diesel Standard 218
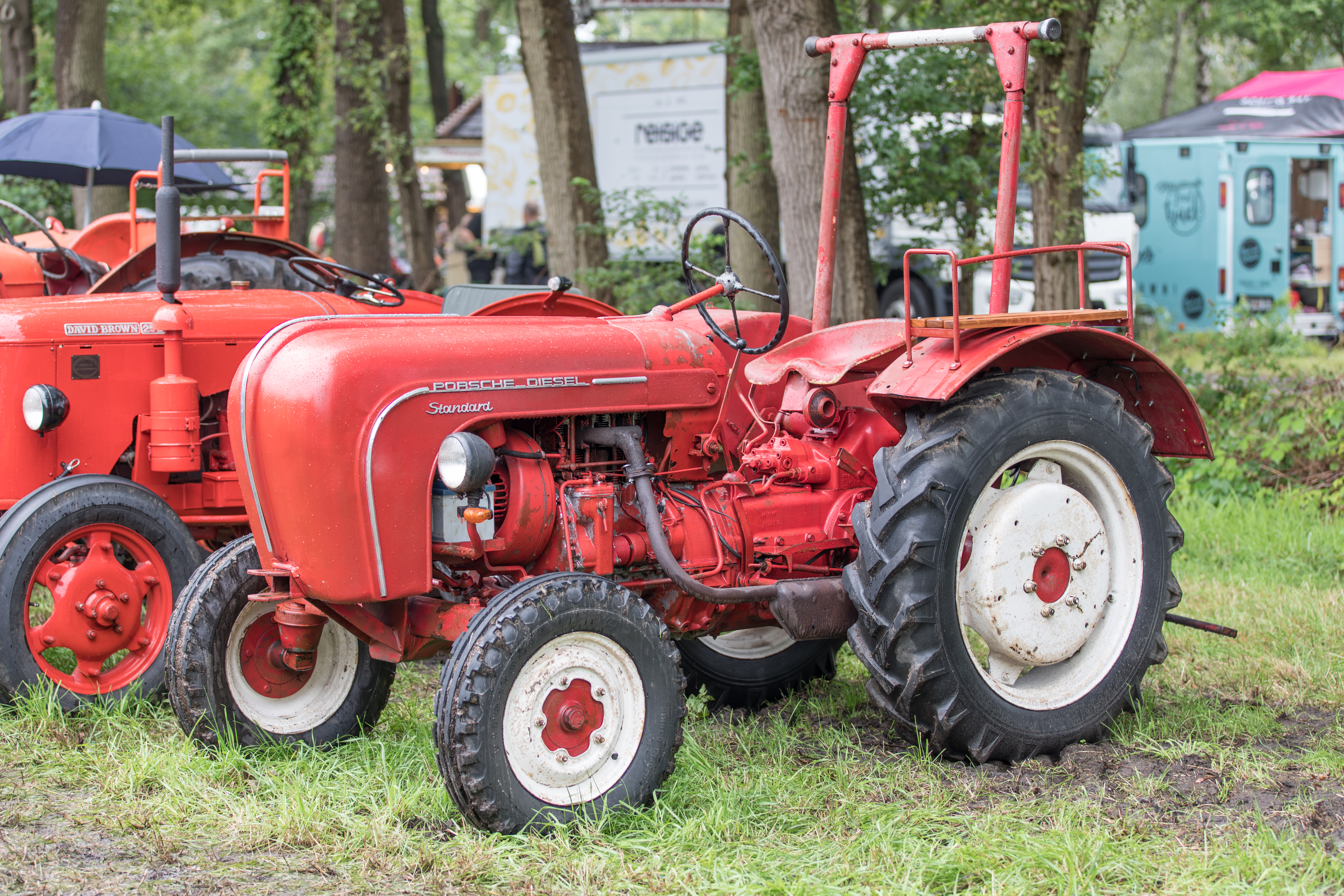
- Porsche-Diesel Standard 218
- Type: Agricultural tractor
- Manufacturer: Porsche-Diesel Motorenbau GmbH
- Production: 1957–1963
- Length: 2835 mm
- Width: 1570 mm
- Height: 1600 mm
- Weight: 1625 kg (including extra weights)
- Propulsion: Air-filled tyres
- Engine model: Porsche F 218 (Diesel, 1644 cm³)
- Flywheel power: 25 PS (18.4 kW)
- Drawbar pull: 1,500 kp (14.7 kN)
- Speed: 20 / 25 km/h
- Preceded by: Porsche-Diesel 208
- Succeeded by: —

The Porsche-Diesel Standard 218, also known as N 218, is the third generation of the two-cylinder Standard tractor series, manufactured by Porsche-Diesel Motorenbau GmbH in Friedrichshafen am Bodensee. The Standard 218 was produced in four different variations. It succeeded its predecessor, the Porsche-Diesel 208 in 1957. In total, the Porsche plant produced more than 12,000 Standard 218 tractors from 1957 to 1963.

== Description ==
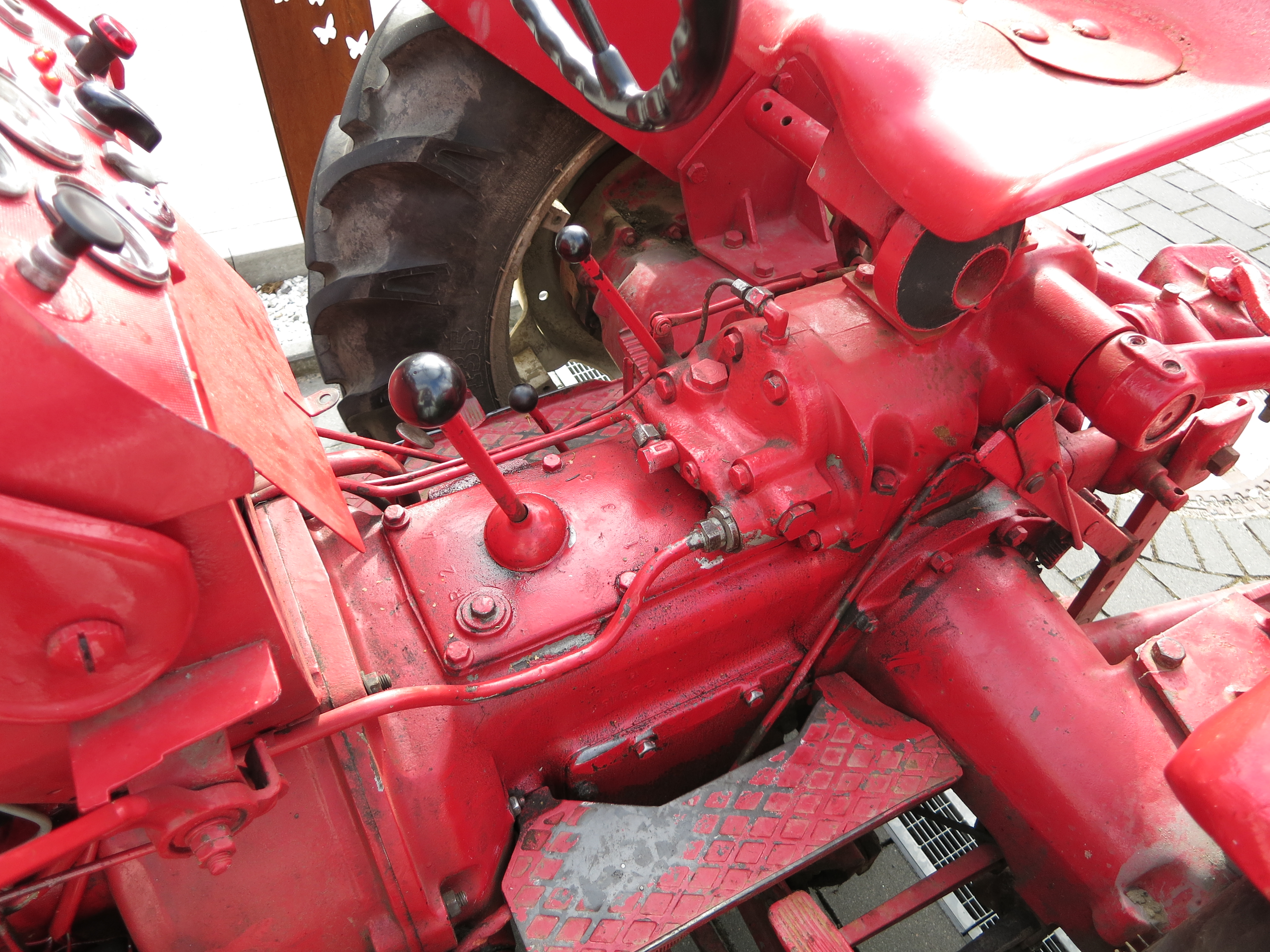
Clutch-housing, gearbox and rear axle (V-Model with 5-speed gearbox)

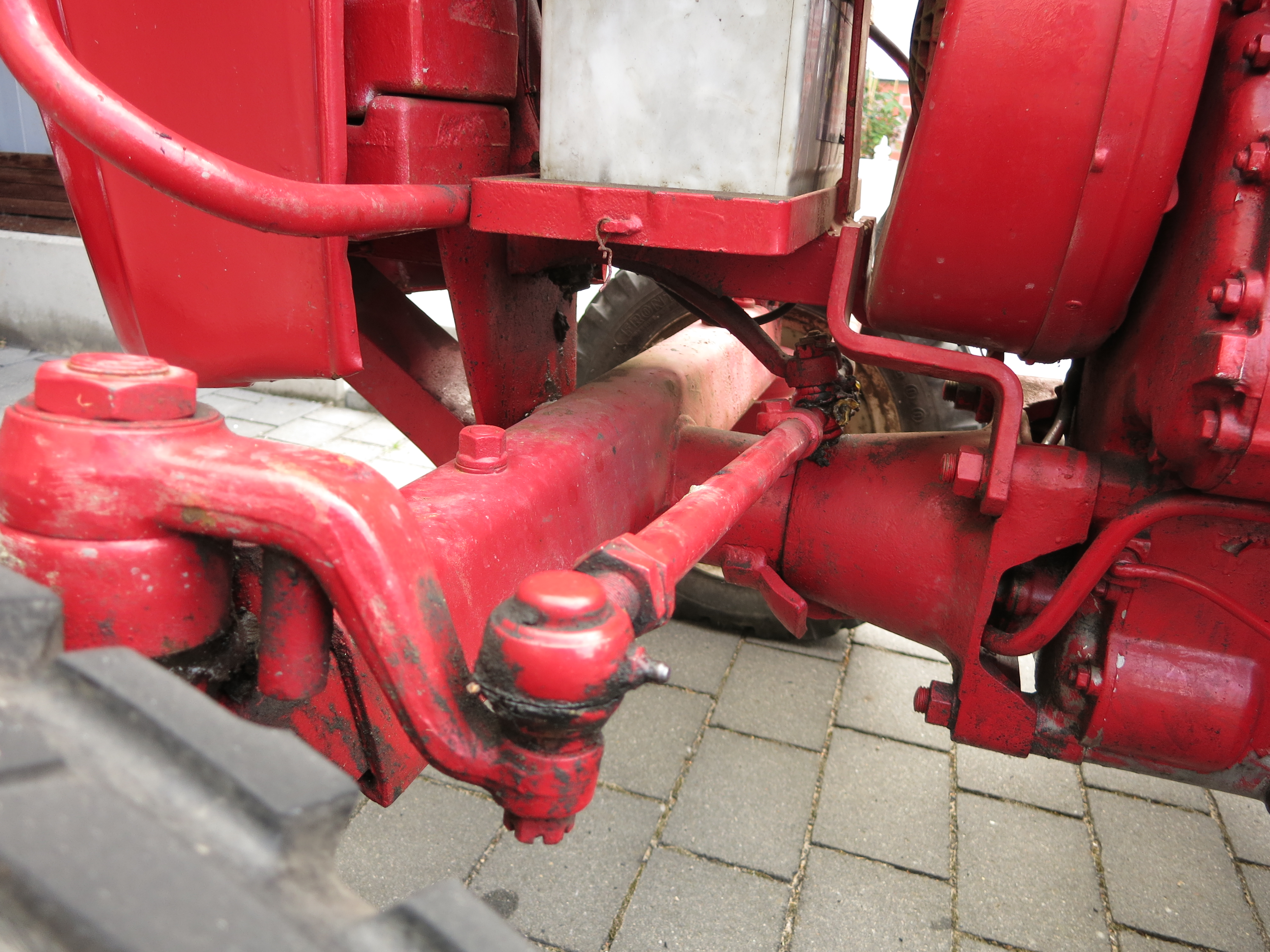
dead front axle

The Porsche 218 utilises a frameless block construction. The rear axle is a live portal axle, the front axle is a dead beam axle with a central pivot point. The wheelbase measures 1668 mm. The track width of the front wheels can be adjusted by turning the rims on the vertical axis. On its rear wheels, the tractor has drum brakes. Either brake can act as a steering brake. Both the steering gear and the gearbox were produced by ZF Friedrichshafen. The H, S, and U Porsche-Diesel 218 models have a six-speed gearbox with a crawler gear. The clutch is a single-disc dry clutch of the type K 200 Z, made by Fichtel & Sachs. It works in conjunction with an oil-hydraulic clutch made by Voith. The Standard V 218 is a stripped-down model: it has a five-speed gearbox, and it lacks the oil-hydraulic clutch.

Porsche-Diesel offered a Three-point linkage as a factory option. It can lift a mass of up to 550 kg. Another factory option was a mower bar, which cost DM 500. The tractor's mass is 1625 kg including the three-point-linkage, the mower bar, and the extra weights. The maximum permissible mass is 2300 kg. The paint colour is RAL 3002 Karminrot for the body, and RAL 1014 or 1015 Elfenbein for the rims. The Standard 218 does not have a fuel tap due to tightness problems.

=== Models ===
Four different models of the Porsche 218 were produced:

- H 218

Base model: six-speed gearbox, oil-hydraulic clutch, chrome decoration trim. H for hydraulic clutch.

- V 218

Simplified model: five-speed gearbox, no hydraulic clutch, no trim. V for vereinfacht (simplified).

- S 218

Narrow gauge model. Like the H 218, but with a track width of 840 / 1240 mm and a wheelbase of 1620 mm. S for Schmalspur (narrow gauge).

- U 218

Shaft switching model. In addition to the standard H-equipment, it has a switchable gear shaft and a switchable power take-off shaft. It was offered with a cab and extended front wheel mudguards. U for umschaltbar (switchable).

=== Engine ===
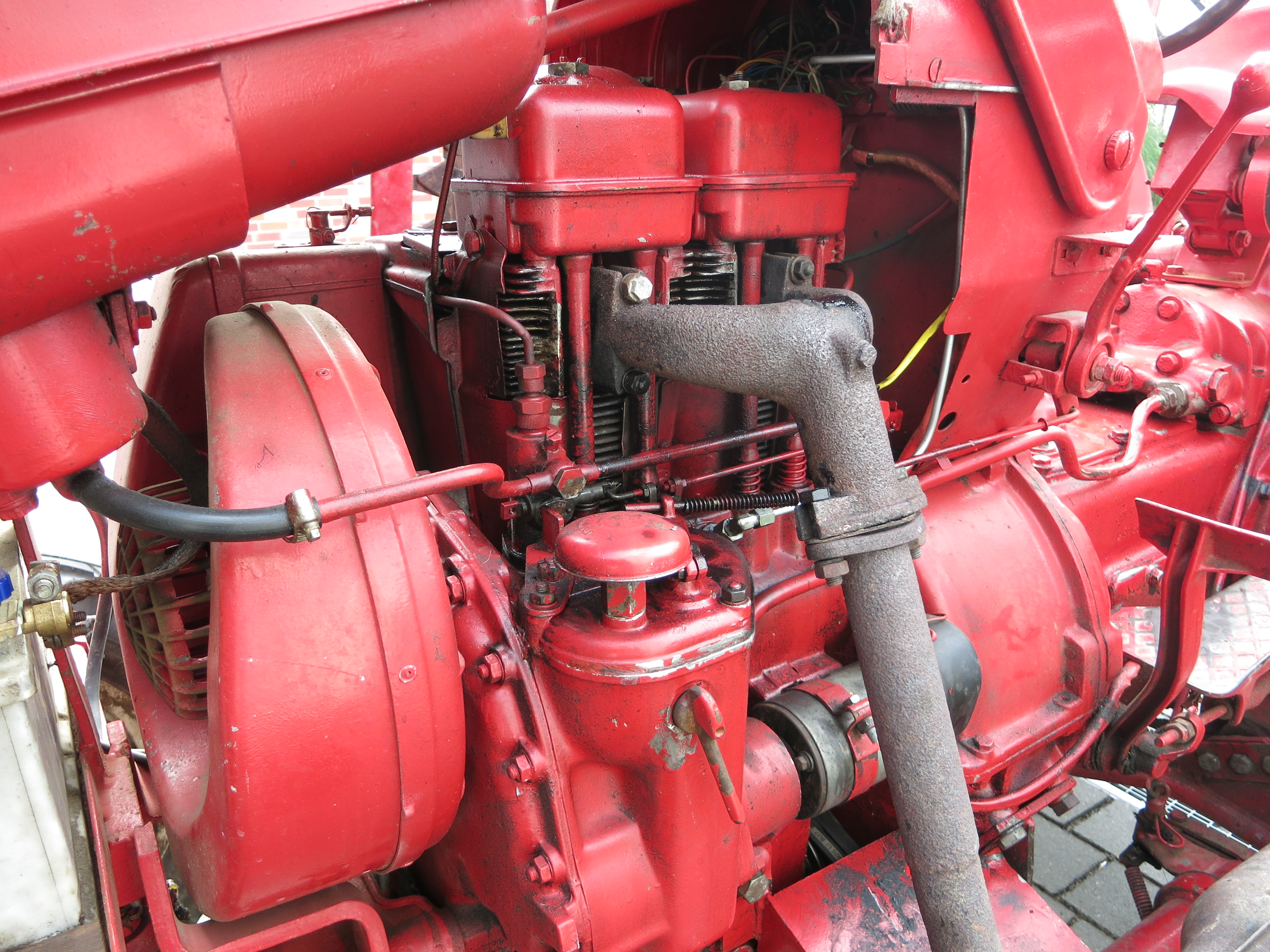
Porsche F 218 diesel engine

Engine sound

The Porsche-Diesel Standard 218 has the Porsche F 218 engine, an air-cooled, two-cylinder, four-stroke diesel engine with swirl chamber injection, and OHV valve train. It has an aluminum crankcase, a radial cooling fan, a wet sump lubrication system, and an oilbath air filter. The crankshaft has three bearings. Each piston has five piston rings. The inline injection pump was manufactured by Bosch.

Porsche F 218 technical specifications

- Bore × Stroke: 95 × 116 mm
- Displacement: 1644 cm³
- Flywheel radius: 400 mm
- Rated power: 25 PS (18.4 kW) at 2000 min^{−1}
- Maximum torque: 9.3 kp⋅m (91.2 N⋅m) at 1800 min^{−1}
- Lowest permissible compression: 19 atü (1.9 MPa)
- Highest permissible compression: 27 atü (2.75 MPa)
- Compression ratio: 19:1
- Injection pressure: 150 atü (14,710 kPa)
- Fuel quality: Diesel engine fuel with 44 CN

== Gallery ==
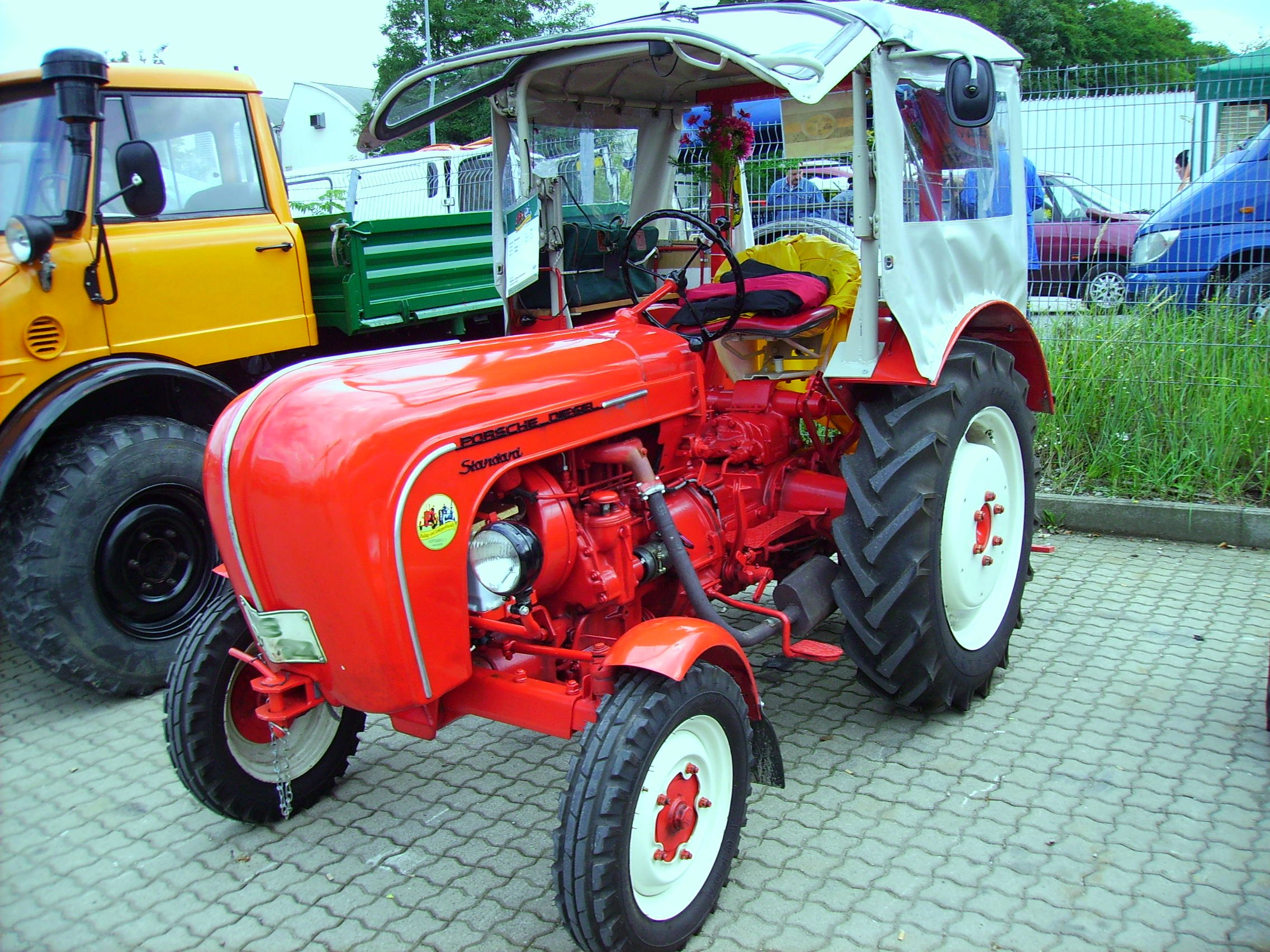
Porsche-Diesel Standard U 218, 1958

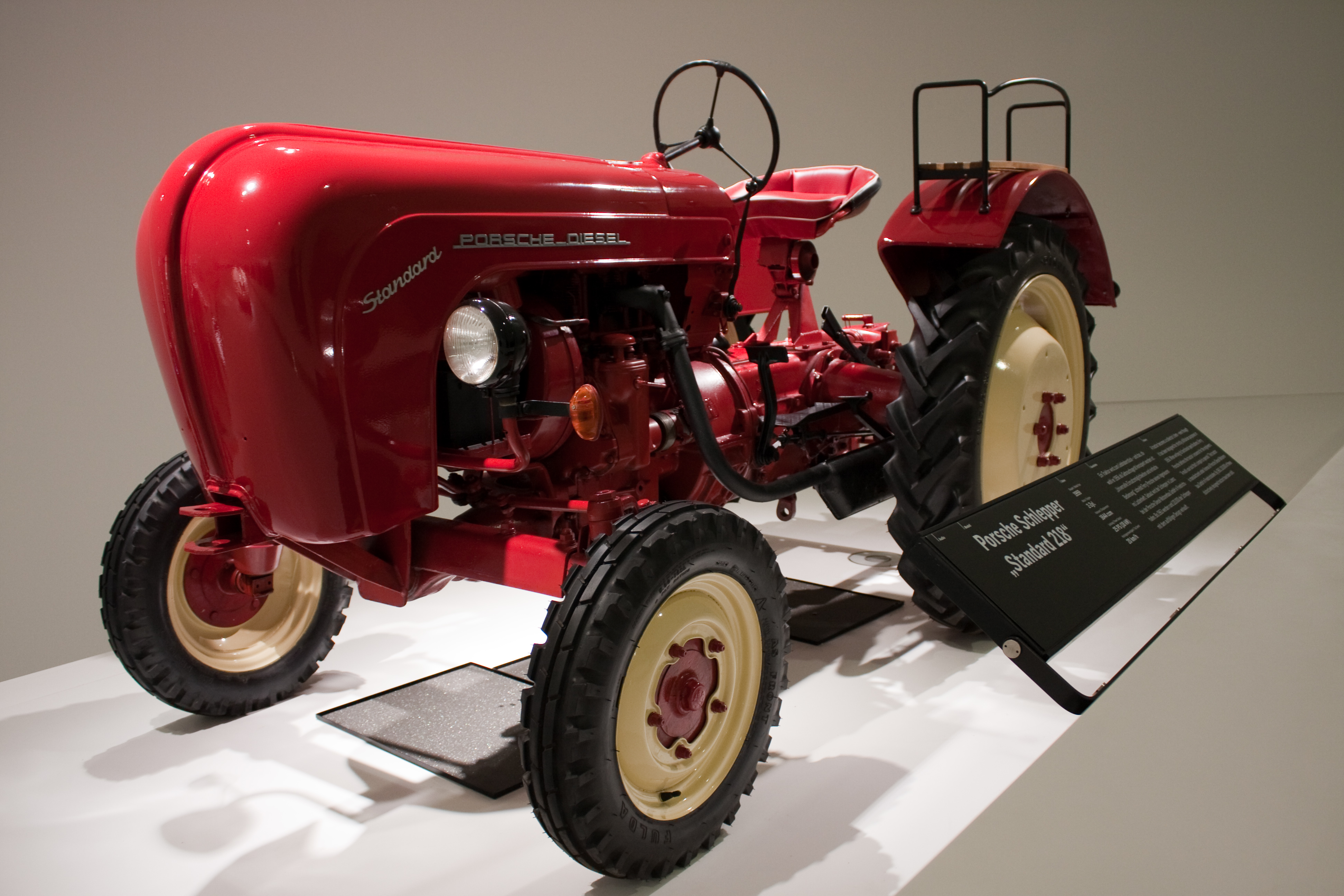
Porsche-Diesel Standard 218 in the Porsche-Museum

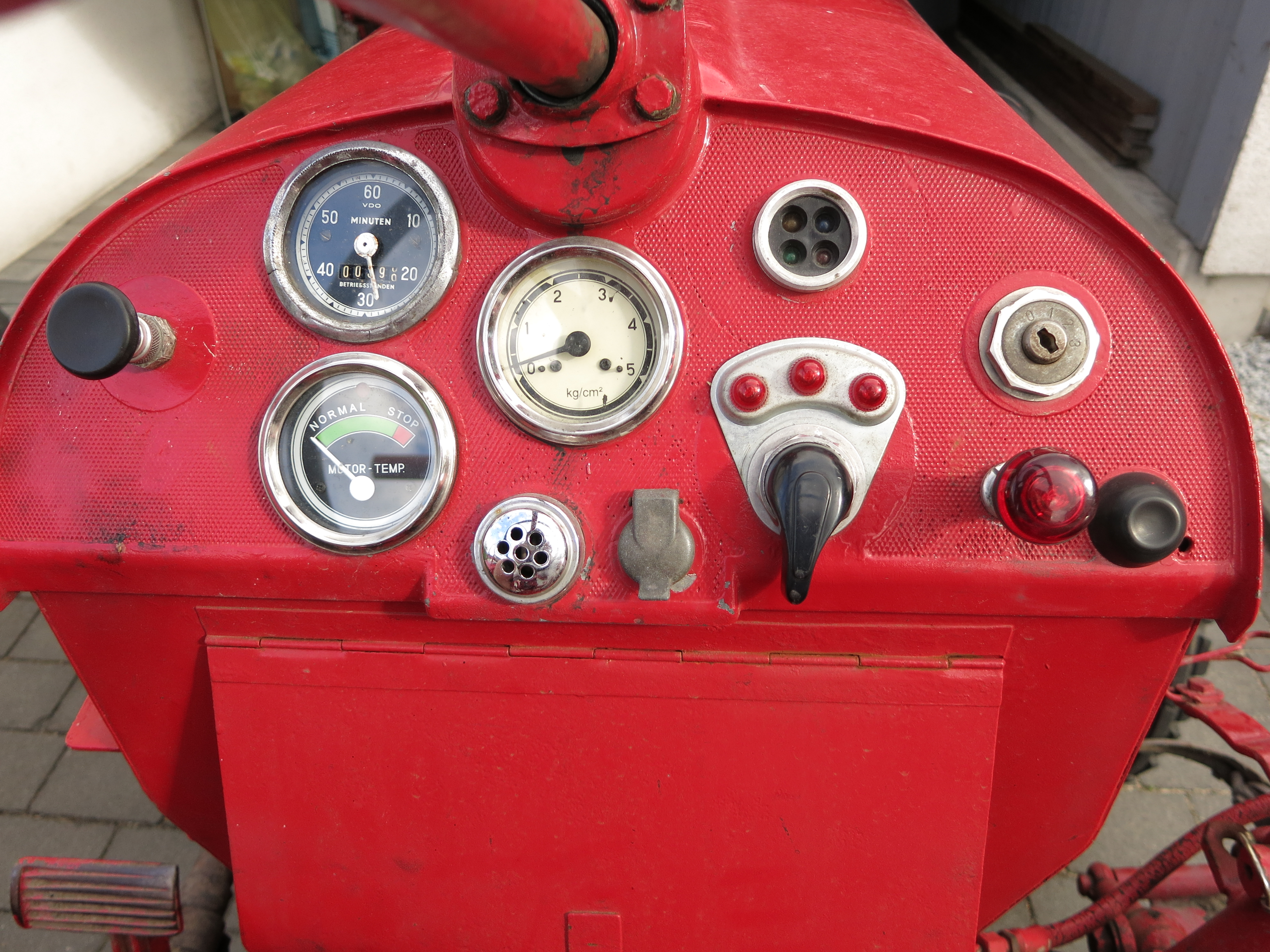
Dashboard

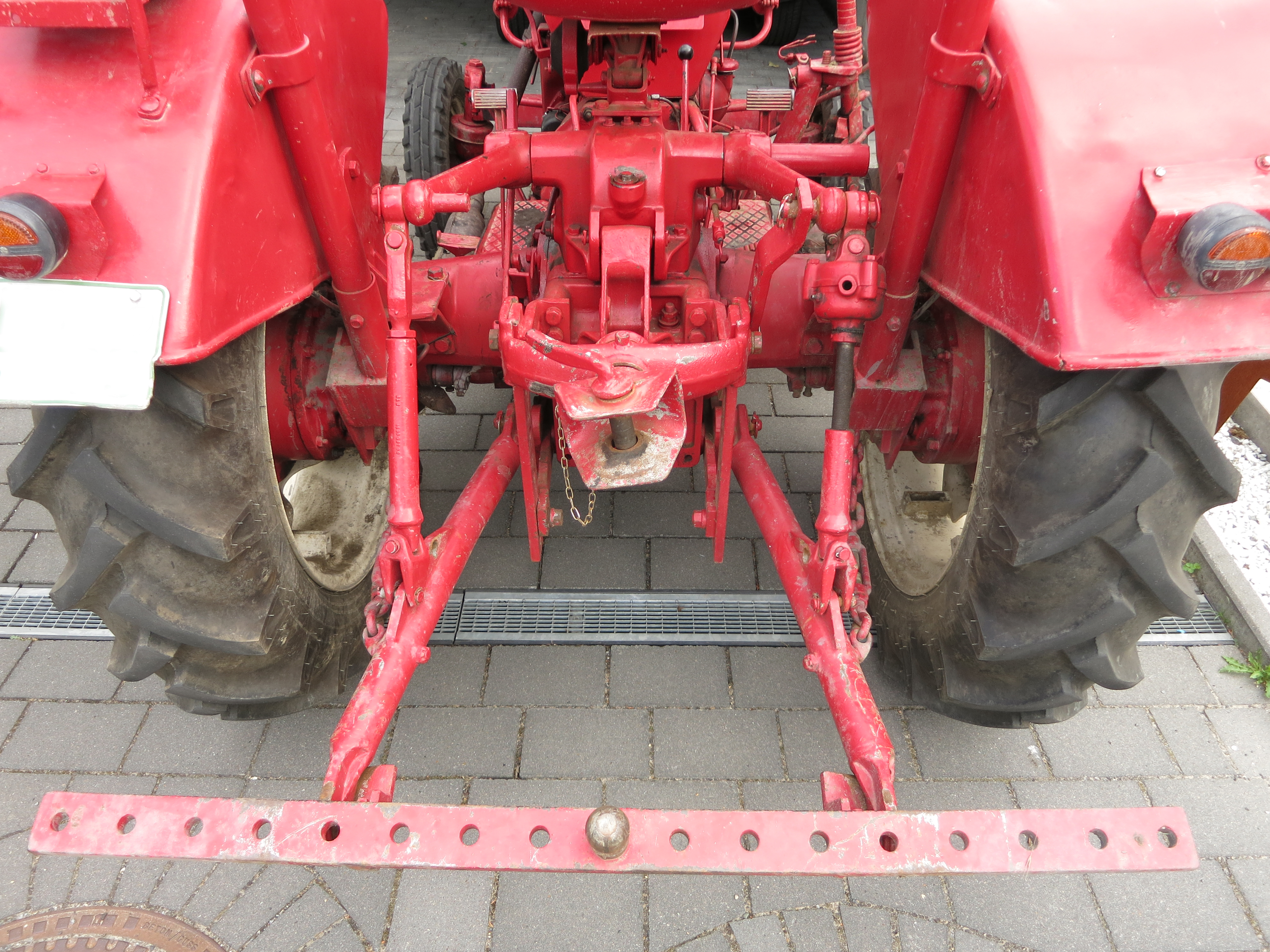
Back of the tractor: Towing hook and linkage. Before a plough can be used, a third arm must be attached to the linkage to gain a three-point linkage.

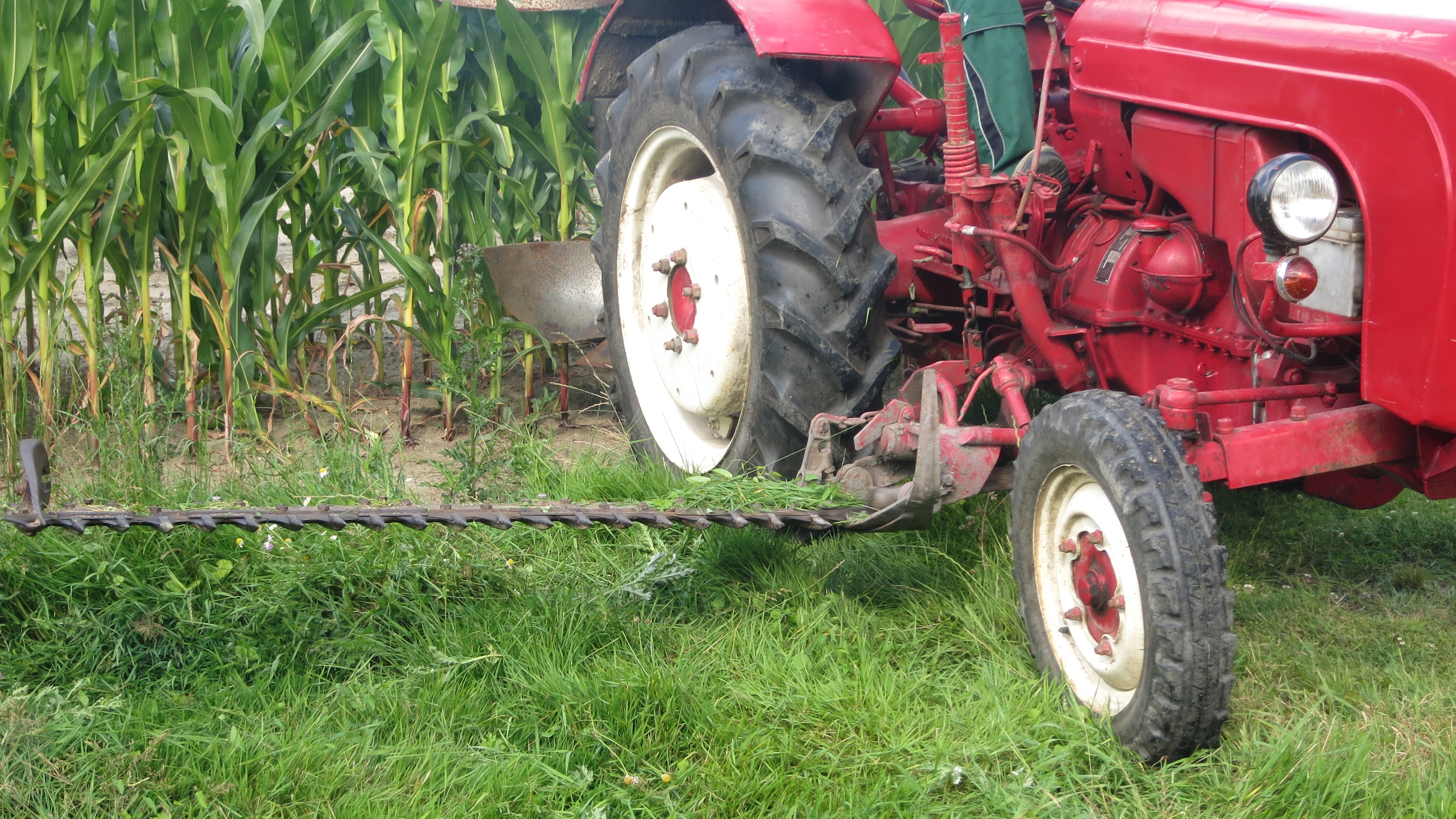
Optional mower bar
