= List of Porsche concept vehicles =

The following is a list of concept vehicles by German carmaker Porsche, a subsidiary of Volkswagen Group. As of September 2021, a total of 49 Porsche concepts have been revealed. 15 concepts remained unrevealed until November 11, 2020, the publish date of the Porsche Unseen, a book about the unrevealed Porsche concept vehicles from the years 2005 to 2019.

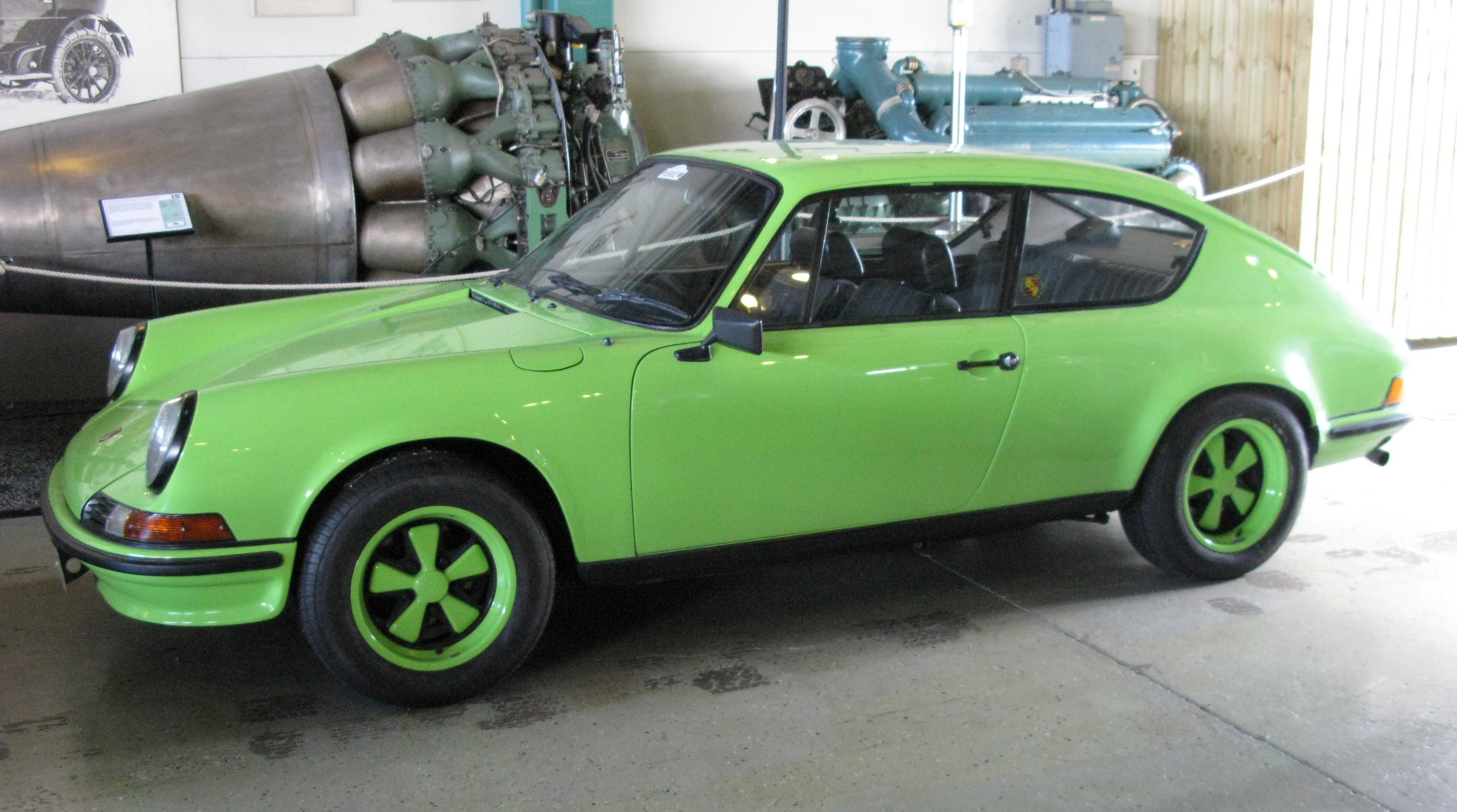
1967 Porsche 911 B17

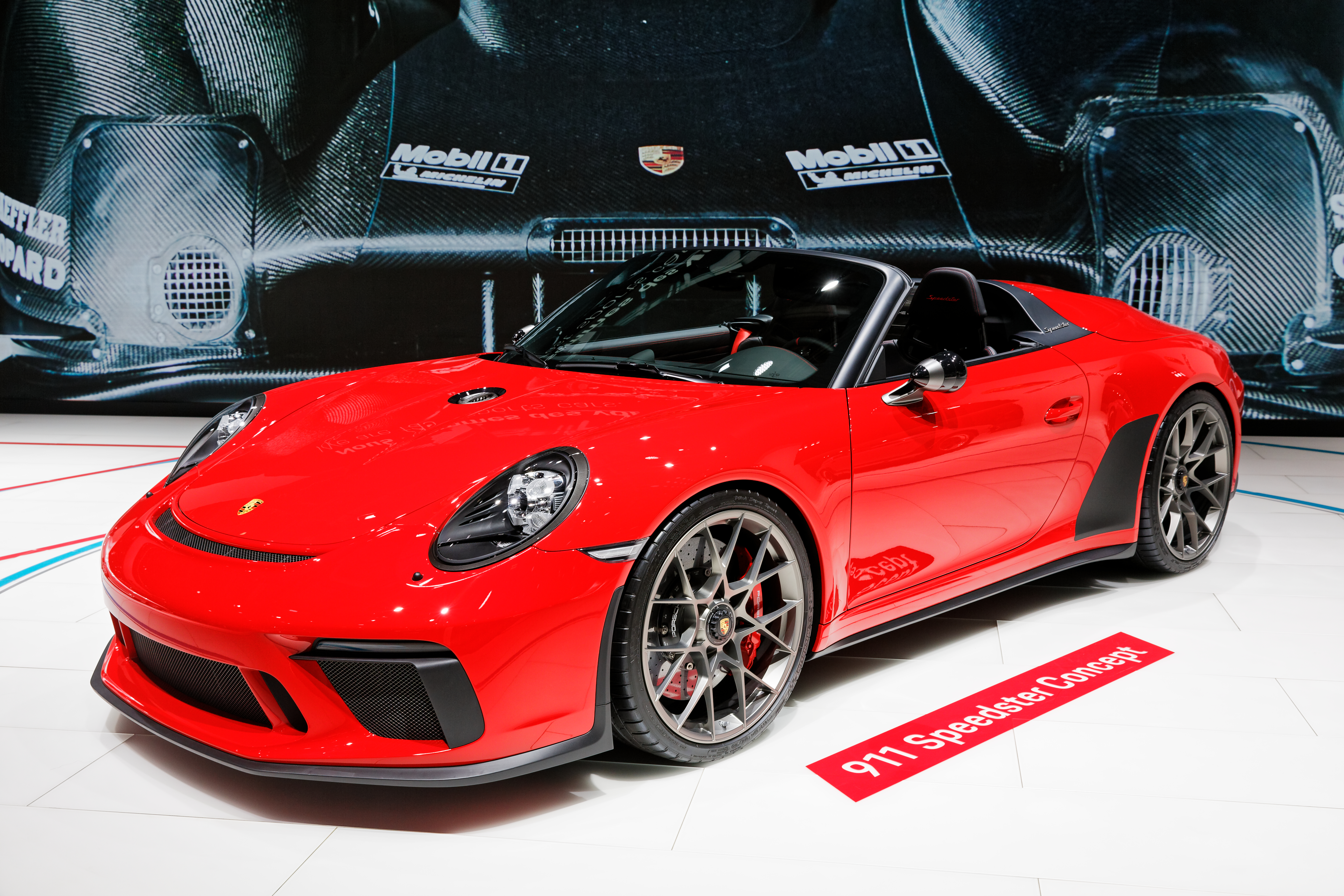
2018 Porsche 911 Speedster concept

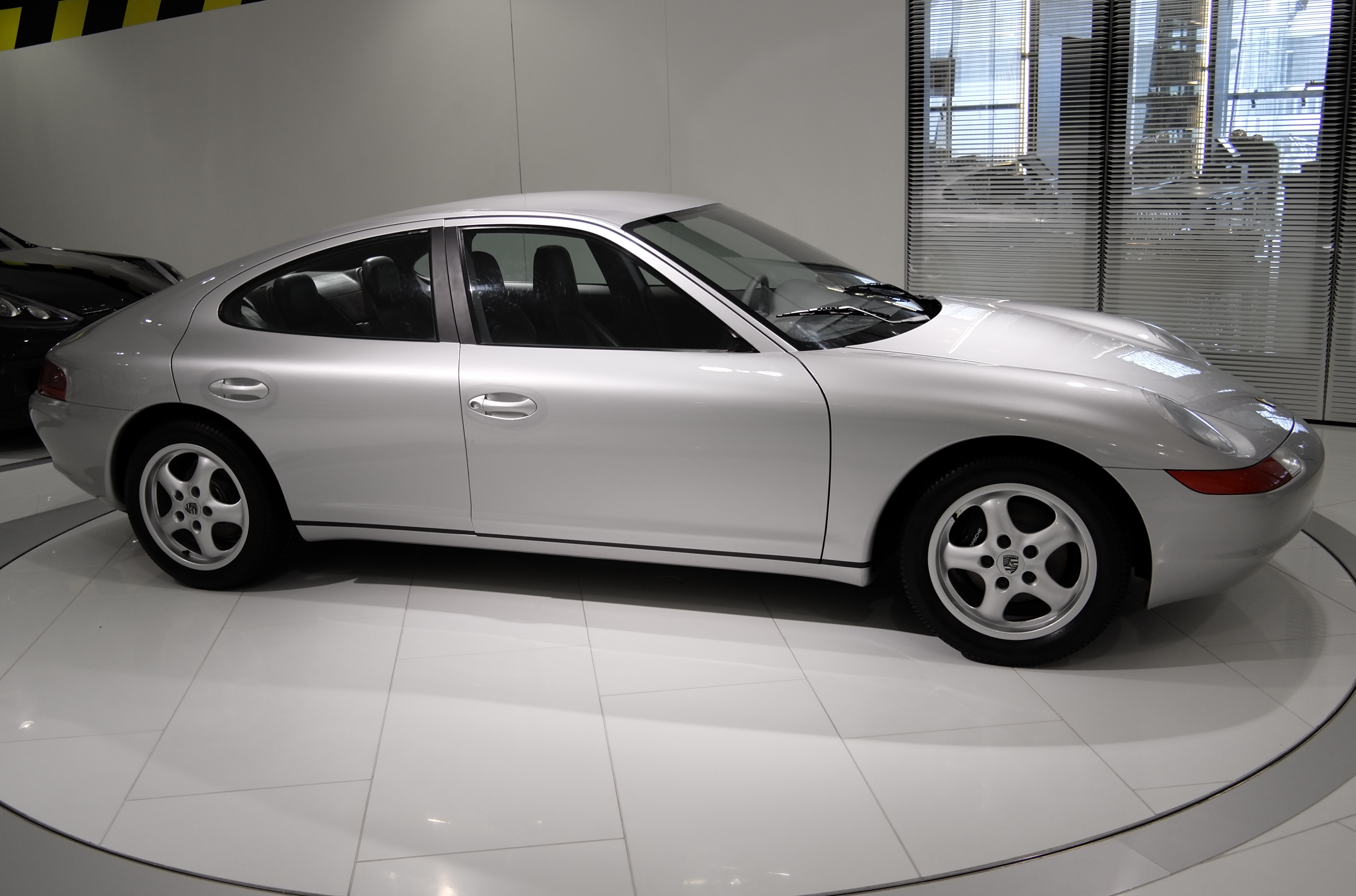
1989 Porsche 989

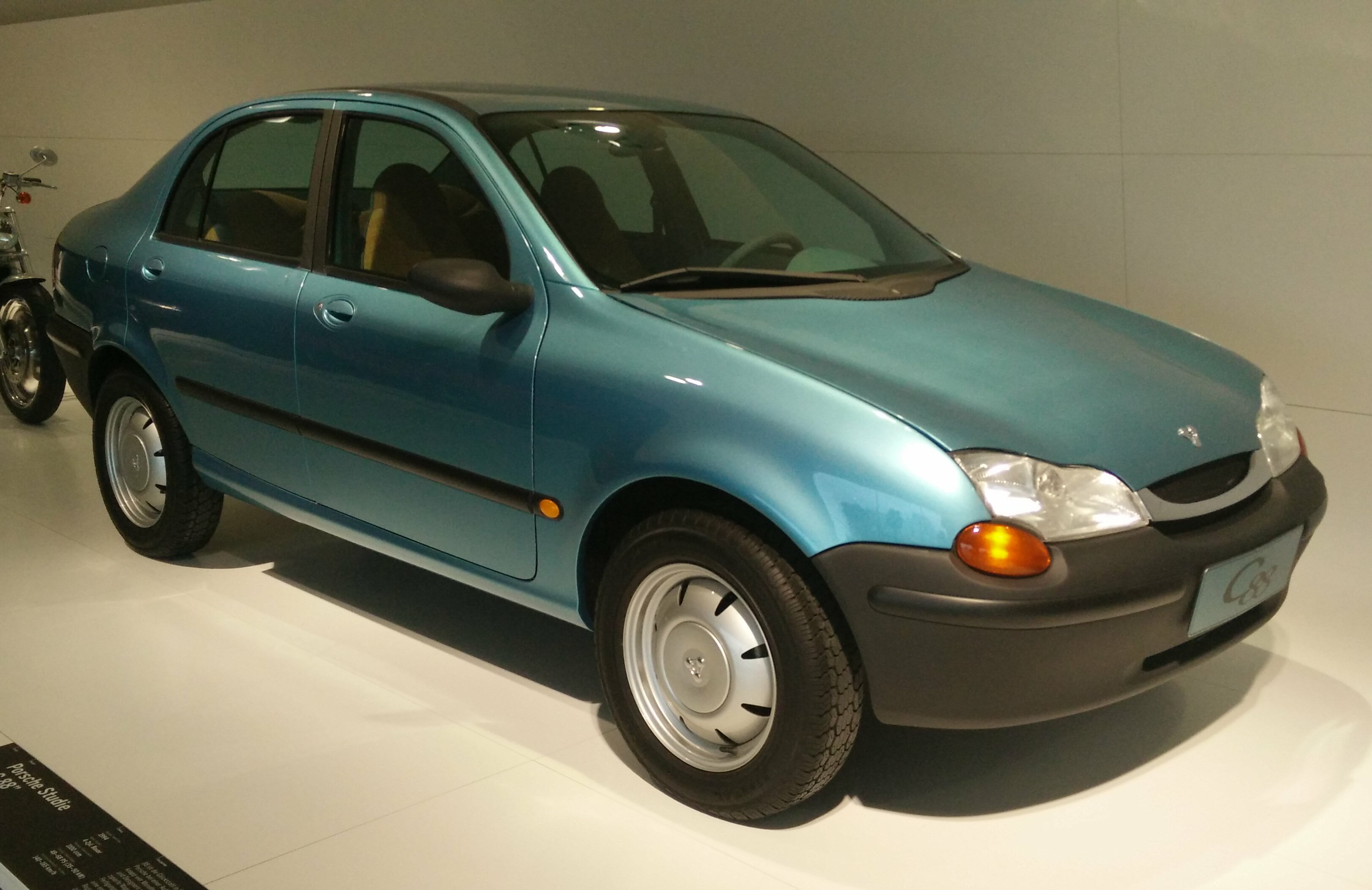
1994 Porsche C88

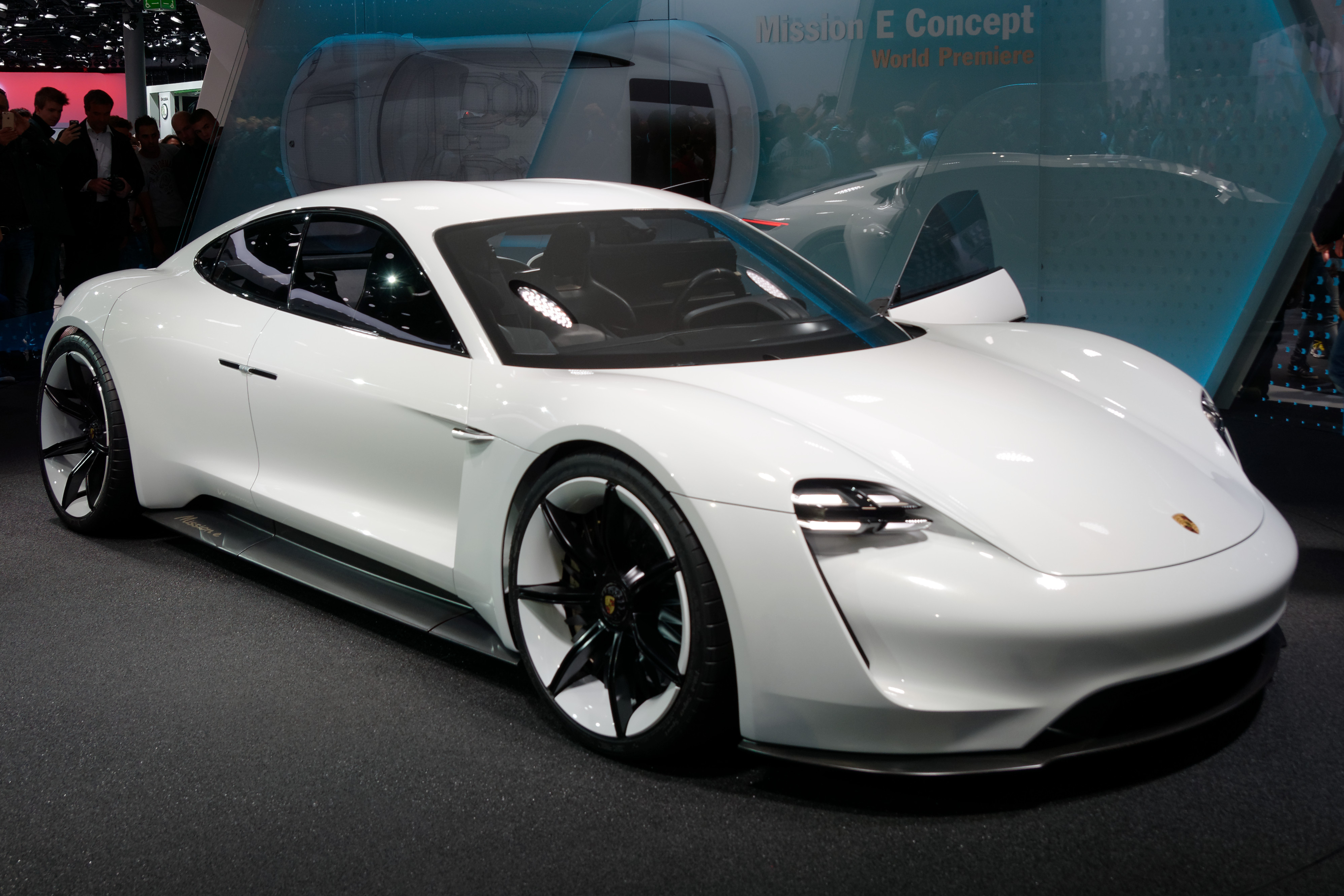
2015 Porsche Mission E

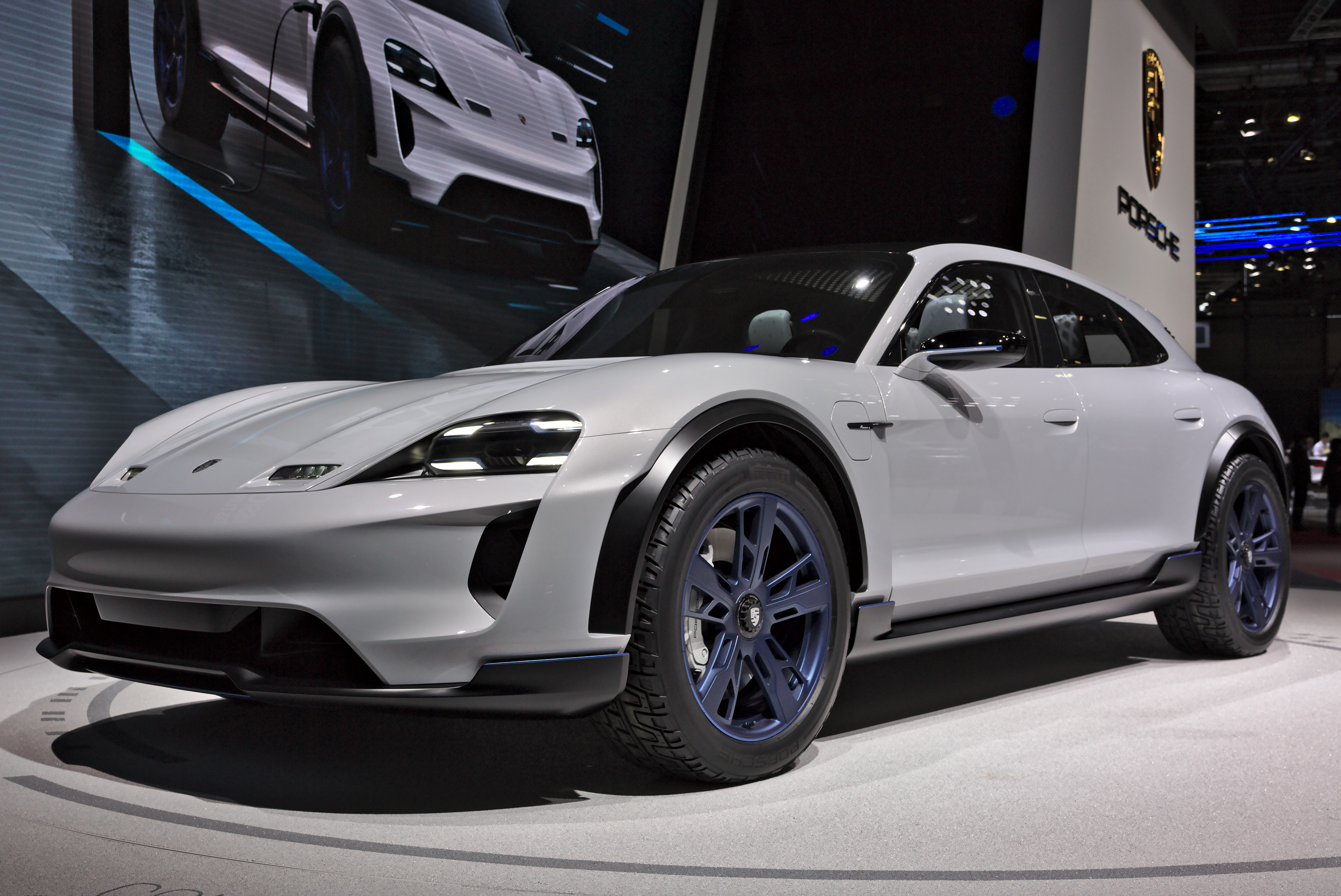
2018 Porsche Mission E Cross Turismo

- 530 (1953), a four-seat sedan for Studebaker
- 542 (1953), a four-seat sedan for Studebaker
- 55One (2008, unrevealed), a roadster
- 633 (1961), a rear-engine, four seat subcompact sedan for Studebaker
- 904 Living Legend (2013, unrevealed), a sports car
- 906 Living Legend (2005, unrevealed), a racing-inspired supercar
- 908-04 (2017), a race car
- 911 3.2 Speedster ClubSport (1987), a speedster
- 911 four-door prototype (1967), a sports car-based sedan
- 911 B17 (1969), a fastback sports car
- 911 HLS (1966), a sports car
- 911 Roadster (1966, Geneva), a roadster
- 911 Speedster concept (2018, Paris), a speedster
- 911 Vision Safari (2012, unrevealed), a sports car-based rally car
- 917 Living Legend (2019), a racing-inspired supercar
- 918 RSR (2011, Detroit), a racing-inspired supercar
- 918 Spyder concept (2010, Geneva), a spyder
- 919 Street (2017, unrevealed), a supercar
- 928 four-door prototype (1987), a 5-door shooting brake
- 969 (1988), a sports car
- 984 (1984), a roadster
- 984 Junior (1984), a roadster
- 989 (1989), a mid-size sedan
- Boxster concept (1993, Detroit), a roadster
- Boxster Bergspyder (2014, unrevealed), a racing-inspired speedster
- C88 (1994, Beijing), a compact sedan
- Carrera GT concept (2000, Paris), a spyder
- Cayenne Cabriolet (2002), a 3-door mid-size SUV-based cabriolet
- Cayman GT4 Clubsport (2018, ADAC Rallye Deutschland), a sports car-based rally car
- Concept Meteor, a 5-door mid-size fastback
- Concept Mirage, a 5-door mid-size fastback
- Concept Phantom, a 5-door mid-size fastback
- FLA (1973, Frankfurt), an experimental 3-door compact hatchback
- Le Mans Living Legend (2016, unrevealed), a racing-inspired sports car
- Macan Vision Safari (2013, unrevealed), a 3-door compact SUV
- Mission E (2015, Frankfurt), a mid-size sedan
- Mission E Cross Turismo (2018, Geneva), a mid-size crossover station wagon
- Porsche Mission R (2021, Munich), a race car
- Mission X(2023) an electric supercar
- Murene (1970, Paris), a sports car
- Panamera Sport Turismo (2012, Paris), a mid-size station wagon
- Panamericana (1989, Frankfurt), a sports car
- Tapiro (1970, Turin), a sports car
- Typ 754 T7 (1959), a sports car
- Type 580, a 2-door coupe
- Vision 357 (2023), a sports car
- Vision 357 Speedster (2023), a sports car
- Vision 916 (2016, unrevealed), a sports car
- Vision 918 RS (2019, unrevealed), a supercar
- Vision 920 (2019, unrevealed), a race car
- Vision E (2019, unrevealed), a race car
- Vision Renndienst (2018, unrevealed), racing-inspired cargo van
- Vision Spyder (2019, unrevealed), a spyder
- Vision Turismo (2016, unrevealed), a mid-size sedan
