= Porsche Unseen =

Photo-book by Stefan Bogner and Jan Karl Baedeker

- Author: Stefan Bogner; Jan Karl Baedeker
- Language: German, English
- Genre: Photo-book
- Publisher: Delius Klasing
- Publication date: November 11, 2020
- Pages: 328
- ISBN: 978-3-667-11980-3

Porsche Unseen is a photo-book by Stefan Bogner and Jan Karl Baedeker about 15 unrevealed concept vehicles from the years 2012 to 2019 by German carmaker Porsche, a subsidiary of Volkswagen Group. Following the publish date on November 11, 2020, the concepts were shown online.

== Concept vehicles from the book ==
On the publish date of Porsche Unseen, November 11, 2020, the 15 unrevealed concept vehicles from the book were shown online. The following below here is a list of the concepts detailed in the book.

=== Porsche 904 Living Legend ===
The Porsche 904 Living Legend is a sports car concept, designed and built by Porsche in 2013, based on the same platform used by the Volkswagen XL1, designed as a modern interpretation of the Porsche 904. Weighing at just over 900 kg (1,984 lbs), the concept retains the general contours found in the XL1, and Porsche even said that the likely powertrain for the 904 Living Legend would be the Ducati V-twin engine carried over from the Ducati 1199. Some of the design elements such as the back fascia were carried over for the second-generation Porsche 935.

=== Porsche 906 Living Legend ===
The Porsche 906 Living Legend is a racing-inspired supercar concept, designed and built by Porsche in 2015, designed with the intent to pay hommage to the original Porsche 906. The 906 Living Legend essentially was a design study meant to preview future electric cars like the Porsche Taycan, and some of its design elements like the wheels and the style of the headlights did end up into the concept that previewed the Taycan, the Porsche Mission E. The company said that the likely powertrain for the 906 Living Legend would have been 4 electric motors powering each wheel.

=== Porsche 911 Vision Safari ===
The Porsche 911 Vision Safari a sports car-based rally car concept, designed and built by Porsche in 2012, based on the Porsche 911 (991) and harkening back to the original car, the Porsche 911 SC Safari from 1978. The 911 Vision Safari concept features a raised suspension, reinforced wheel housings, large bumpers, a rally-focused cockpit with race seats and a roll cage, quad-exhaust tips, special Martini livery, and a special shelf mounted above a fan behind the seats, meant to cool down the driver's helmet. Being a fully-driveable prototype, the concept showcased its off-roading capabilities by being tested on a gravel track at the Weissach test facility. being first driven by the designer, Michael Mauer, where Porsche tests their SUVs, the Cayenne and Macan. Performance remains the same as the standard Porsche 911 (generation 991).

=== Porsche 917 Living Legend ===
The Porsche 917 Living Legend is a racing-inspired supercar concept, designed and built by Porsche in 2013, designed as a modern interpretation of the winning Porsche 917KH at the 24 Hours of Le Mans. The design elements such as a low riding height and the general aerodynamics created the basis of the design for the concept. Additionally, the livery was taken straight from the winning 917KH, including the number. Some design elements of the 917 Living Legend concept are reminiscent of the Porsche 918 Spyder, such as the wheels and the front fascia. The concept was built to celebrate 50 years since the win at Le Mans. Although the concept was already revealed at the Colors of Speed exhibition at the Porsche Museum in March 2019, the full details about it were not released until November 11, 2020. The car also appears in Gran Turismo 7 as an exclusive playable vehicle, where it has been given a fictitious, modeled interior, and is depicted to be powered by a 5.0-liter twin-turbocharged V8 engine producing 976 hp (718 kW) and a curb weight of 1,220 kg (2,690 lbs).

=== Porsche 919 Street ===
The Porsche 919 Street is a supercar concept, designed and built by Porsche in 2017, based on the highly successful Porsche 919 Hybrid LMP1 race car. The dimensions and basic design elements of the 919 Street are the same as that of the race car. However the 919 Street instead has a less-pronounced wing that connects the two rear haunches and incorporates LED taillights across its width, compared to the race car, additionally featuring a big diffuser and exhaust pipes. The powertrain for the Porsche 919 Street comes straight from the race car, which consists of the 2-liter turbocharged V4 and KERS energy recovery system. However, this iteration makes 900 hp (671 kW) than the 1,000 hp (746 kW) from the race car.

The front cover of Porsche Unseen is the rear view of the 919 Street.

=== Porsche 960 Vision Turismo ===
The Porsche 960 Vision Turismo is a mid-size sedan concept, designed and built by Porsche in 2016 that previewed some of the future design cues that Porsche would incorporate into the Porsche 911 (facelifted 991.2). The creation of the concept happened nearly by accident, as the designer, Michael Mauer, chanced upon a sketch of the Porsche 918 Spyder and thought it had four doors instead of two. The supposed powertrain wavered between mid-engine format and electric format. The latter was chosen, and preceded the plans for Porsche to make an electric car, specifically the Porsche Taycan. The general contour lines and shape of the concept did end up making it on the second generation of the Porsche Panamera.

=== Porsche Boxster Bergspyder ===
The Porsche Boxster Bergspyder is a racing-inspired speedster concept based on the 981-generation Porsche Boxster designed and built by Porsche in 2014 that harkens to Porsche's lightest race car, the Porsche 909 Bergspyder, weighing only 384 kg (846 lbs). The concept is a fully-driveable prototype, and weighs just 1,130 kg (2,491 lbs), featuring a shallow windscreen, a full roll bar, instrument panels from the Porsche 918 Spyder, a single seat and a helmet shelf (in place of the passenger seat). Power comes from a 3.8-liter twin turbocharged flat-6 engine, from the Porsche Cayman GT4, with power at 393 PS (387 HP), making its weight-to-power ratio within the concept at 2.8 kg (6.17 lbs) per PS, resulting in a projected zero to 62 mph (100 km/h) acceleration time of just over 4 seconds. The Porsche Boxster Bergspyder made its initial debut at the Gaisberg Hillclimb in 2019, however full details weren't released until November 11, 2020. The concept is currently on display at the Porsche Museum, next to the 909 Bergspyder.

=== Porsche Le Mans Living Legend ===
The Porsche Le Mans Living Legend is a racing-inspired sports car concept, designed and built by Porsche in 2016, that harkens back to the Porsche 550A Spyder. The concept has front and rear lids that open in opposite directions. The racing numbers positioned at the front and on the driver side door, as with the 550 Spyder. Additionally, the refuelling of the concept is done using a central port at the front. Meanwhile, the eight-cylinder is behind the cockpit, making it a mid-engine sports car and a fully driveable prototype. The engine of the concept is also embedded with a pair of large air intakes. The concept also served as a preview to what would be the next generation of the Porsche 718 Cayman GT4.

=== Porsche Macan Vision Safari ===
The Porsche Macan Vision Safari is a 3-door compact SUV coupe concept, designed and built by Porsche in 2013, essentially showing what would be an off-road version of the Porsche Macan. The concept only had two doors compared to the four in the normal SUV, and came with a host of off-road-oriented accessories, some of them including an increased ride height, larger front and rear tires, a full roll-cage, active four-wheel drive, a dual-clutch gearbox, and an adaptive chassis that can be set up for off-roading. Design elements of the concept had inspiration from the Porsche 911 SC Safari, and the Porsche 959 Paris-Dakar rally car.

=== Porsche Vision 916 ===
The Porsche Vision 916 is an electric sports car concept, designed and built by Porsche in 2016, to preview what would be a small, lightweight electric sports coupe, with design harkening back to the Porsche 914-based 916 prototype from 1971. The concept has an overall minimalist design, and Porsche says that it is powered by four in-hub electric motors, one at each wheel, additionally all tributes to the first all-wheel drive Porsche race car, which Ferdinand Porsche developed back in the 1900s.

=== Porsche Vision 918 RS ===
The Porsche Vision 918 RS is a supercar concept, designed and built by Porsche in 2019, to preview what essentially could be the next generation of a trackday, street-legal Porsche 918 Spyder if it were still in production. Some of the design elements, which bear much resemblance to the original 918, include sharp and soft creases and large air intakes, three fins on the widened rear fenders and roof, a big diffuser at the back, enlarged side skirts, reshaped front hood and new front and rear lights. Porsche said that the concept's supposed powertrain would have been stronger in power than the original 918.

=== Porsche Vision 920 ===
The Porsche Vision 920 is a race car concept, designed and built by Porsche in 2019, to preview what essentially could be a potential successor to their highly successful LMP1 race car, the Porsche 919 Hybrid. Porsche says the company designed the concept as either a super sports car for the road or as a possible racing car that could be used in a customer motorsport series. Design elements include a red, black, and white livery, a pair of slim LED headlights and large air intakes on both sides of the motorsport-inspired splitter, visible in-board front suspension. The concept has a small cabin with a central driving position. The concept also features a reverse shark fin on the roof to help with high-speed stability, along with the decklid and engine cover being long and low. The concept also includes a thin LED light bar and a massive diffuser to help to stick it to the pavement, all design elements harkening back to the 919. The car also featured a Gran Turismo logo on the roof section of the car's bodywork, and was also originally intended for one of the early design ideas of the Porsche Vision Gran Turismo concept vehicle.

=== Porsche Vision E ===
The Porsche Vision E is a race car concept, designed and built by Porsche in 2019, to preview what essentially would be a future customer race car from Porsche. Using technology from their Formula E race car, the 99X, the company says that this concept would preview what would be a race car that private individuals can drive, to get the closest feel to Formula E in terms of performance and driving dynamics. The concept's design is that of a lightweight, single-seater race car, with a central driving position and with a supposed powertrain of 800-volt technology.

=== Porsche Vision Renndienst ===
The Porsche Vision Renndienst is a racing-inspired van concept, designed and built by Porsche in 2018, to show a futuristic van from the company, harkening back to the original Rennsport van. Design elements include minimalist headlights, a sporty front fascia, a long sloping roof, five-spoke alloy wheels and the traditional Porsche rear end with the full striped taillights. Porsche didn't release the interior of the van, but the company has noted that the concept has a central driver's seat and a “modular travel cabin” that accommodates up to five passengers. The company even says that the electric van's powertrain components are located beneath the floor, so that passengers are treated to an spacious cabin with a “Porsche-like flair."

=== Porsche Vision Spyder ===
The Porsche Vision Spyder is a spyder concept, designed and built by Porsche in 2019, to pay tribute to the Porsche 550 RS Spyder. Design elements carried over from the Porsche RS Spyder LMP2 include the silver paint, the bulgy fenders, the two-seat open cockpit, a license plate that reads "Little Rebel," in a nod to Dean's Rebel Without a Cause, as well as the louvering on the engine cover. The concept's design elements served as a design study for the design of future production Porsche cars, such as its roll bar and the vertical headlights.
