= Porsche Vision 357 Speedster =

Overview
- Manufacturer: Porsche
- Production: 2023

Body and chassis
- Class: Concept Car
- Body style: Coupe
- Related: Porsche Vision 357

Powertrain
- Engine: Electric: Permanent magnet synchronous
- Power output: 1075hp

The Porsche Vision 357 Speedster is an electric spider concept car produced by German automobile manufacturer Porsche, presented in July 2023 and intended to celebrate the 75th anniversary of the manufacturer, much like the Porsche Vision 357 presented six months earlier.

== Presentation ==
The Porsche Vision 357 Speedster was presented on 13 July 2023 at the Goodwood Festival of Speed. The Vision 357 Speedster is inspired by the original 357 Speedster, a roadster version of Porsche's first model, launched on June 8, 1948. It celebrates the 75th anniversary of the Stuttgart manufacturer. The Speedster's two-tone Glace grey and Grivola grey metallic paintwork is covered with 75 decals to celebrate this anniversary.

== Technical specifications ==
The Vision 357 Speedster is based on the Porsche 718 GT4 e-Performance prototype shown at the 2022 Goodwood Festival of Speed.

It uses permanent synchronous electric motors for the front and rear wheels, as well as the 80 kWh battery from the 2021 Porsche Mission R concept, and the chassis from the Porsche 718 GT4 Clubsport.
