= Porsche 984 =

Porsche concept vehicle

Overview
- Manufacturer: Porsche
- Model years: 1984-1987
- Assembly: Weissach

Body and chassis
- Class: Concept car
- Body style: Two-door roadster
- Layout: RR layout

Powertrain
- Engine: 2.0 L (1,984 cc) turbocharged Type 4 F4
- Transmission: 5-speed manual

Dimensions
- Curb weight: 880 kg. (1,940 lbs.)

The Porsche 984 Junior (Also known as the 984) was a 2-door roadster concept from the German automobile manufacturer Porsche, that was in development between 1984 and 1987. It was designed to be a small, affordable and fuel-efficient sports car similar to the Porsche 924, albeit with a lower sales price. It was conceptualized in cooperation with Spanish automaker SEAT, although Porsche eventually pressed forward with development on their own. The entire project was discontinued in early 1988.

== History ==
The Porsche 984 concept was inspired by a joint project done with SEAT, and together the two companies birthed the "Porsche PS", which was never prototyped. A 1.5 L inline-four watercooled engine, officially codenamed "System Porsche", was developed shortly after to go along with the PS, although SEAT later kept it and used it in the first generation SEAT Ibiza. A 2.0 L flat-four engine developed entirely by Porsche was prepared for use in the 984 instead.

SEAT eventually left the project, and Porsche chose to proceed with the development of the concept alone. According to Porsche, the car was designed to appeal to a younger audience, with a planned price that was somewhere in the area of 40,000 DM (Approx. US$66,000 adjusted for inflation) Had it gone into production, it would have likely replaced the Porsche 924 as the entry-level vehicle in their lineup.

In spite of whatever promise the prototype may have shown, plummeting sales worldwide (both at Porsche and across the automotive industry) following Black Monday in October of 1987 rendered the continuation of development economically infeasible. This brought the project to a halt by March of 1988.

== Design ==
The 984 concept was very similar to the aforementioned Porsche-SEAT (PS) project, and were very similar in terms of what they were intended to be. Both were to be a lightweight, fun to drive, and affordable vehicle, and the rear-engine configuration, among other features, seemed to reflect these aspirations. During development, large portions of the manufactured prototypes contained parts throughout both the interior and exterior that were pulled from other Porsche models of the era. (Including the Porsche 944 and 924, as well as the Porsche 911)

Much unlike the 924, the designers at Porsche ostensibly planned for the car to incorporate an optional all-wheel drive system, as well as a hard-top. These features, especially all-wheel drive and its rear engine layout, would help to separate it from other roadsters of the era, such as the Mazda MX-5. (which would be put into production by Mazda just two years after the development of the 984 was cancelled) Porsche would, despite the end of the 984 project, later go on to produce the Boxster during the 1990s, which was designed to serve a very similar purpose to the 984 concept.

== Engine ==
The only engine used in the 984 concept was the 2.0 L Volkswagen Type 4 engine found in the Porsche 914, which was, in stark contrast to the 1.5 L "System Porsche" engine found in the SEAT Ibiza, an aircooled unit. Despite this flat-four being used in the prototype models, an all new flat-four engine was supposedly also in development for use in aircraft, as well as a final, production model of the 984. It made 99 kW (135 bhp; 135 PS), and according to track tests that were done by Porsche during development, the vehicle itself had a top speed of approximately 220 km/h (137 mph). The engine within allowed the 984 a 0-60 time of roughly 8 seconds. The planned cabriolet and all-wheel drive models may have impacted those results, had they ever been developed.
