= Porsche Vision 357 =

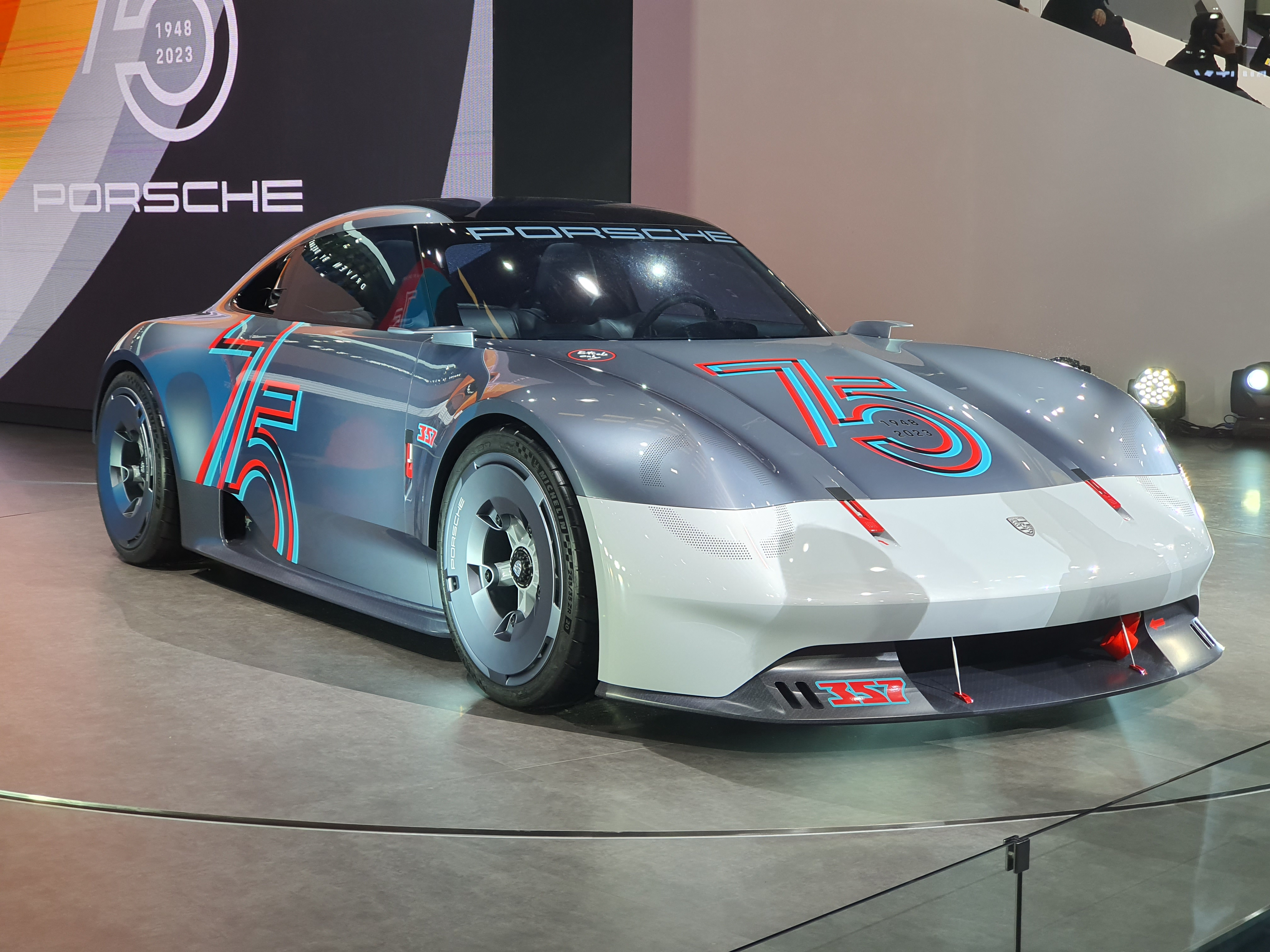

Overview
- Manufacturer: Porsche
- Production: 2023

Body and chassis
- Class: Concept Car
- Body style: Coupe
- Platform: Porsche 718 Cayman
- Related: Porsche Vision 357 Speedster

Powertrain
- Engine: Petrol: 6-cyl. flat 4.0
- Power output: 500hp DIN(368kW)
- Transmission: 7-speed PDK

The Porsche Vision 357 is a coupe concept car produced by German automobile manufacturer Porsche, presented in January 2023 and intended to celebrate the 75th anniversary of the company.

== Presentation ==
The Porsche Vision 357 was unveiled on January 26, 2023. It pays homage to the Porsche 356, the brands first model, launched on June 8, 1948, alongside celebrating the 75th anniversary of the Stuttgart manufacturer at the "75 Years of Porsche Sports Cars" exhibition at the Porsche Museum in Zuffenhausen. Its two-tone Glace grey and Grivola grey metallic paintwork is covered with 75 decals to celebrate this anniversary.

In July 2023, Porsche unveiled the Vision 357 Speedster concept, an all-electric tribute to the 356 Speedster.

== Technical specification ==
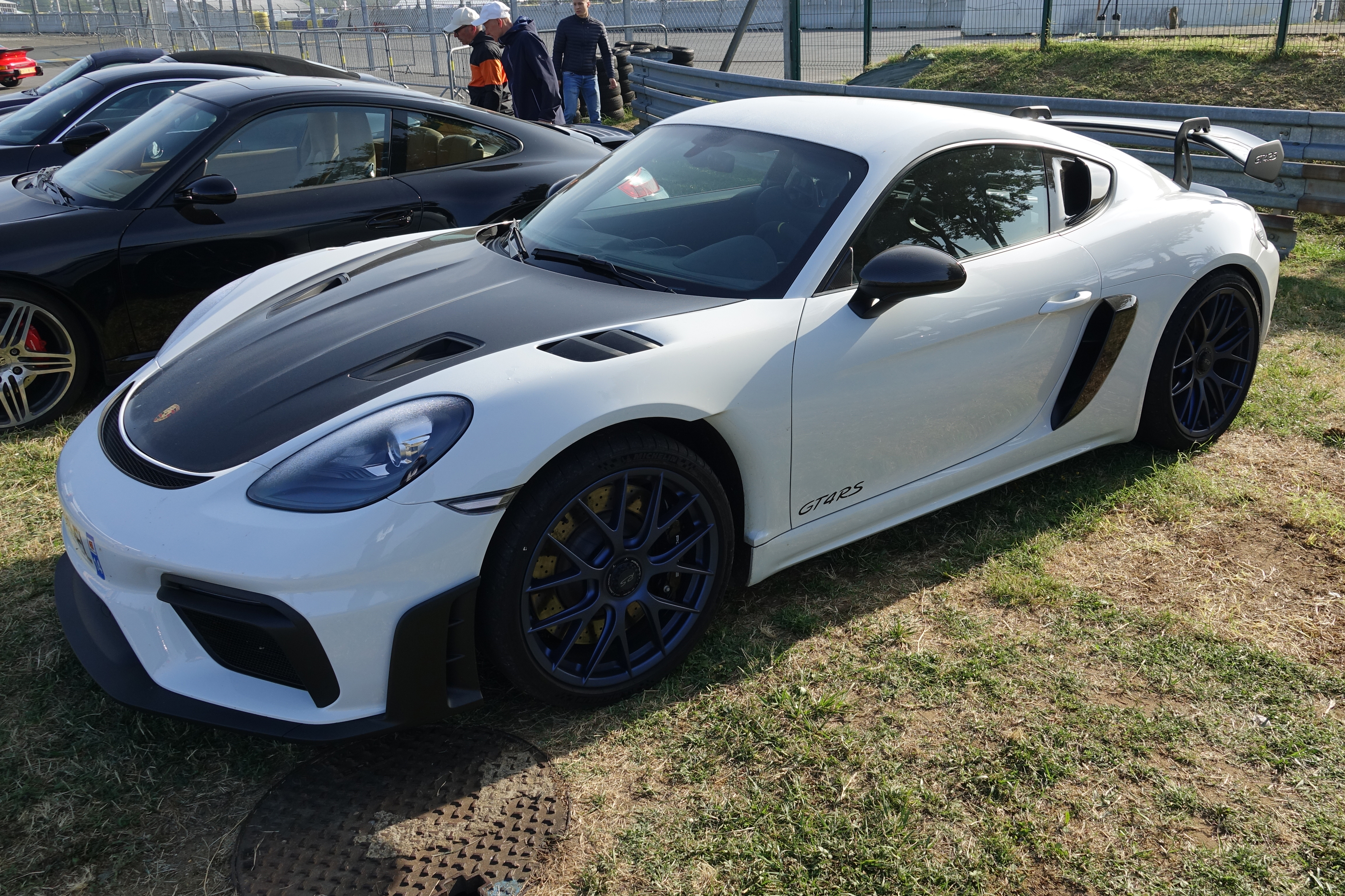
Porsche 718 Cayman GT4 RS

The Vision 357 is based on the Porsche 718 Cayman GT4 RS, featuring the 4-litre, flat 6 petrol engine from the Cayman, producing 500 hp.

== Gallery ==
Porsche Vision 357 at Seoul Mobility Show 2023

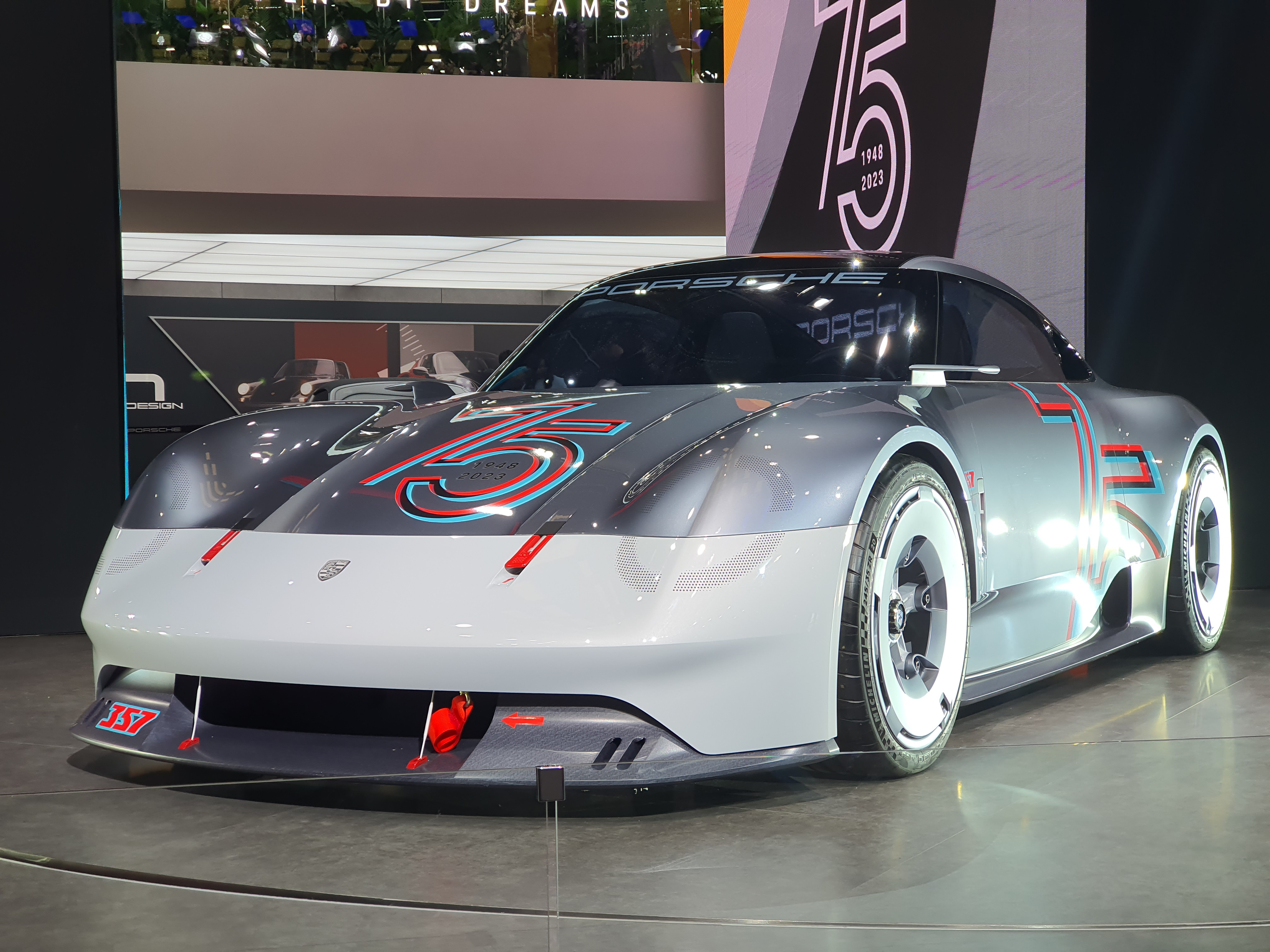

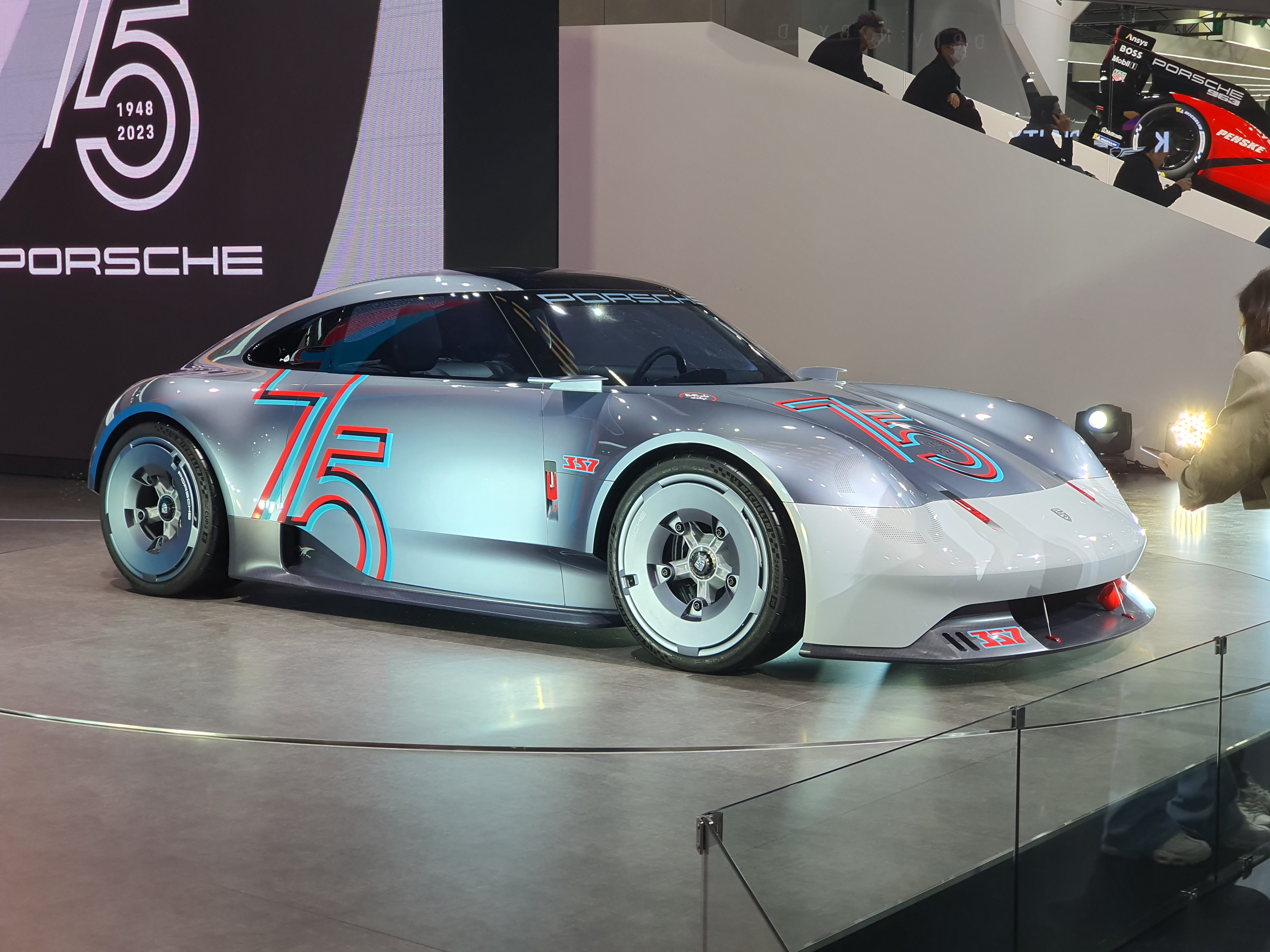

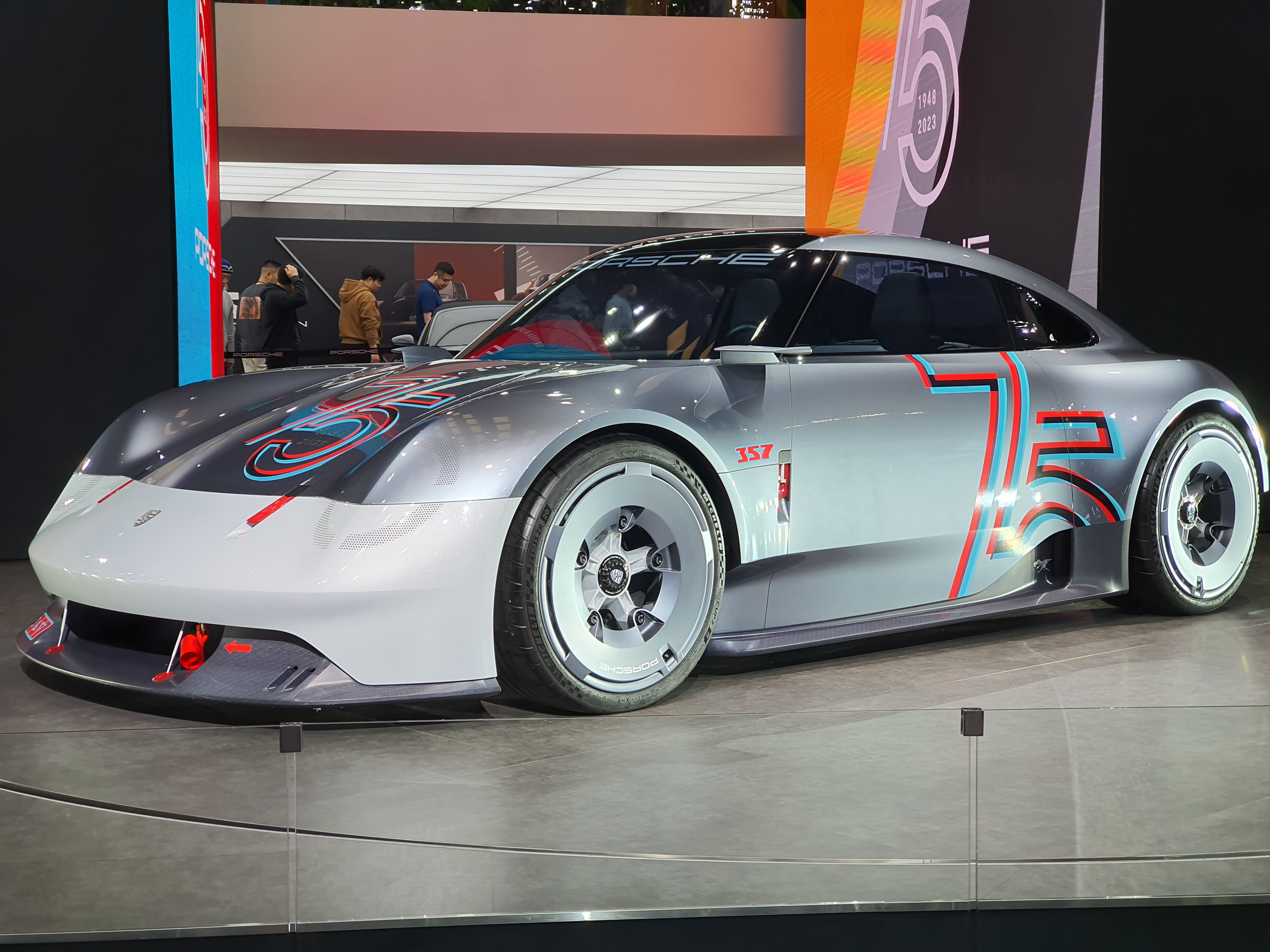

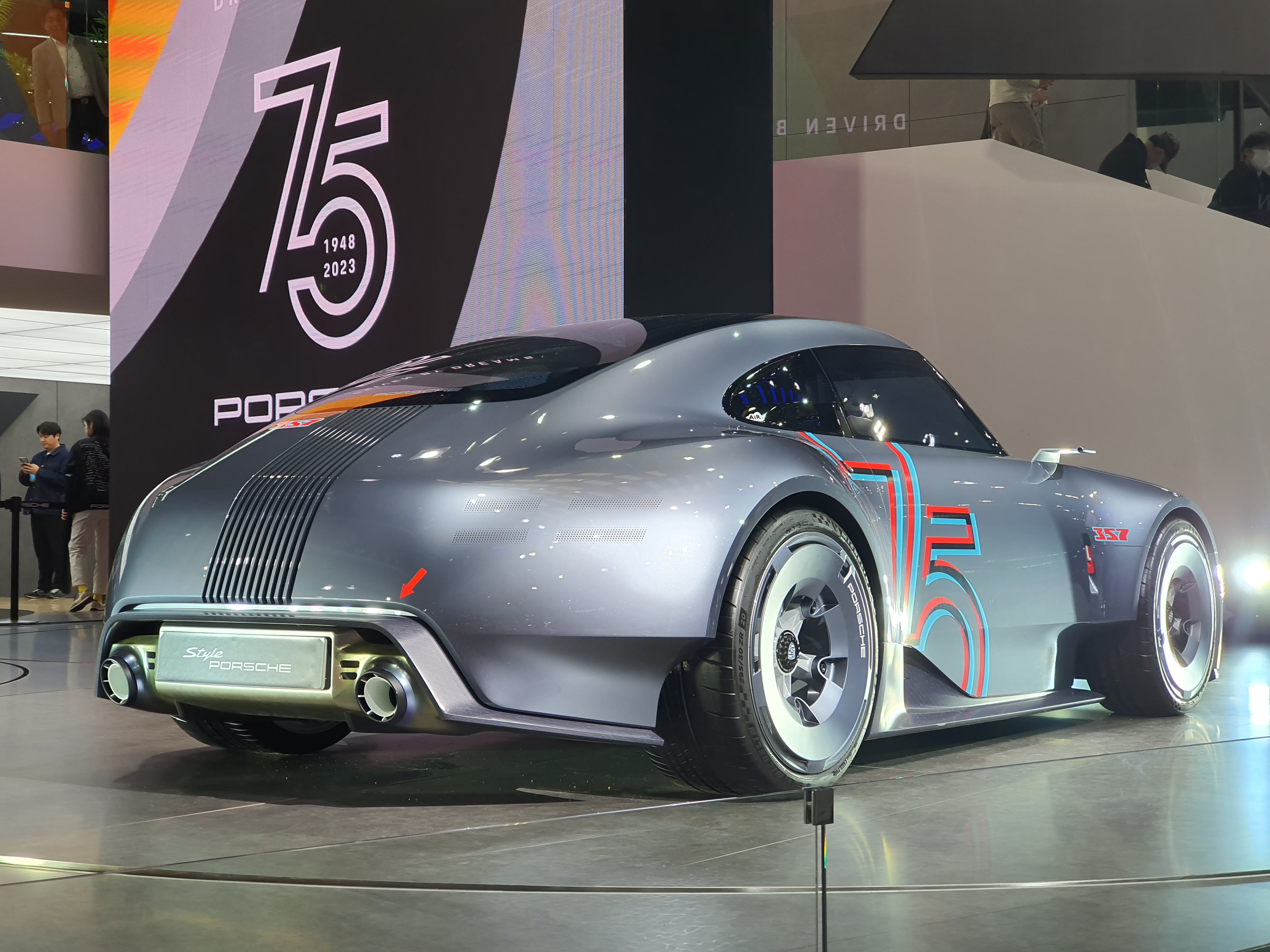

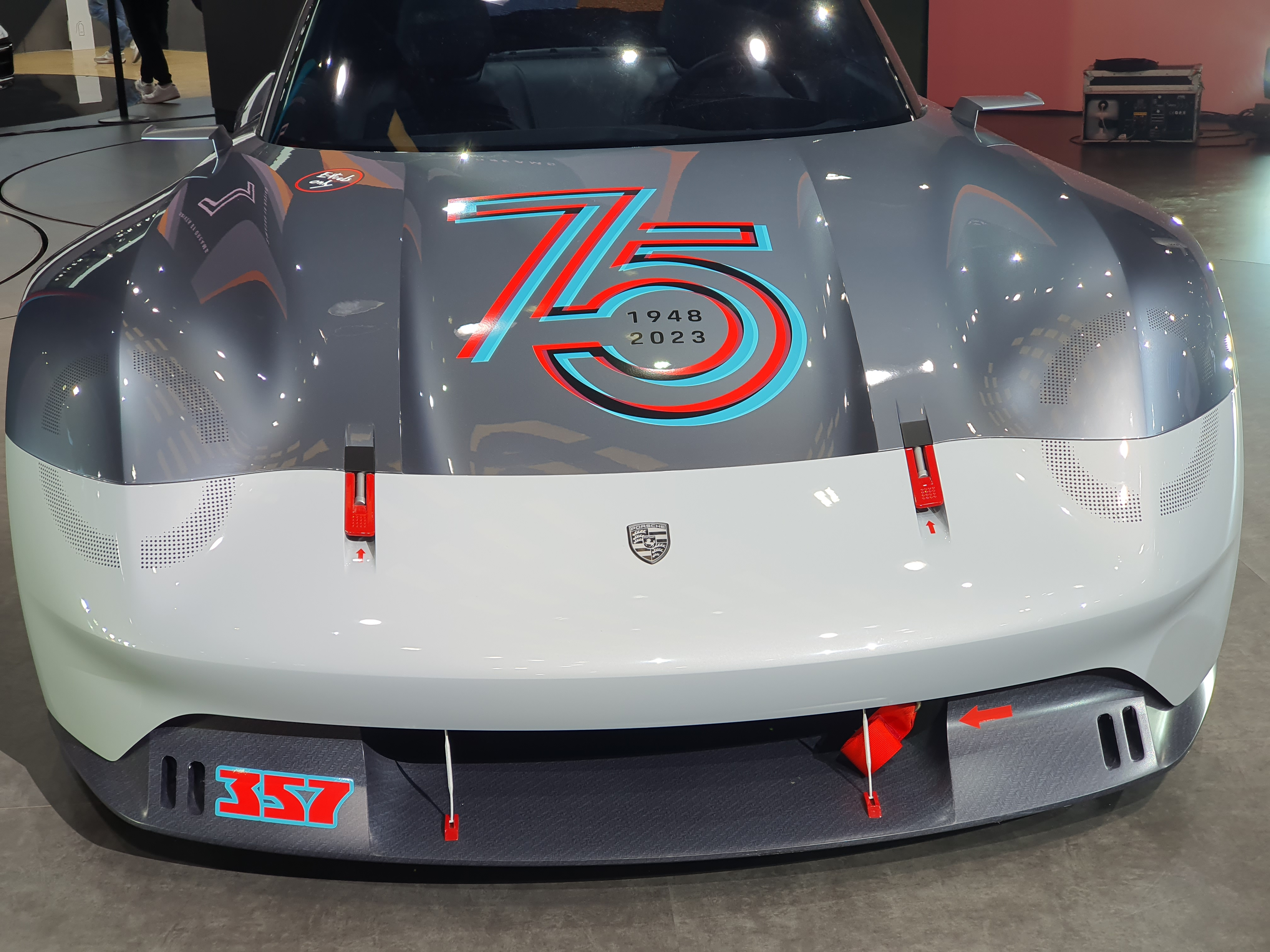

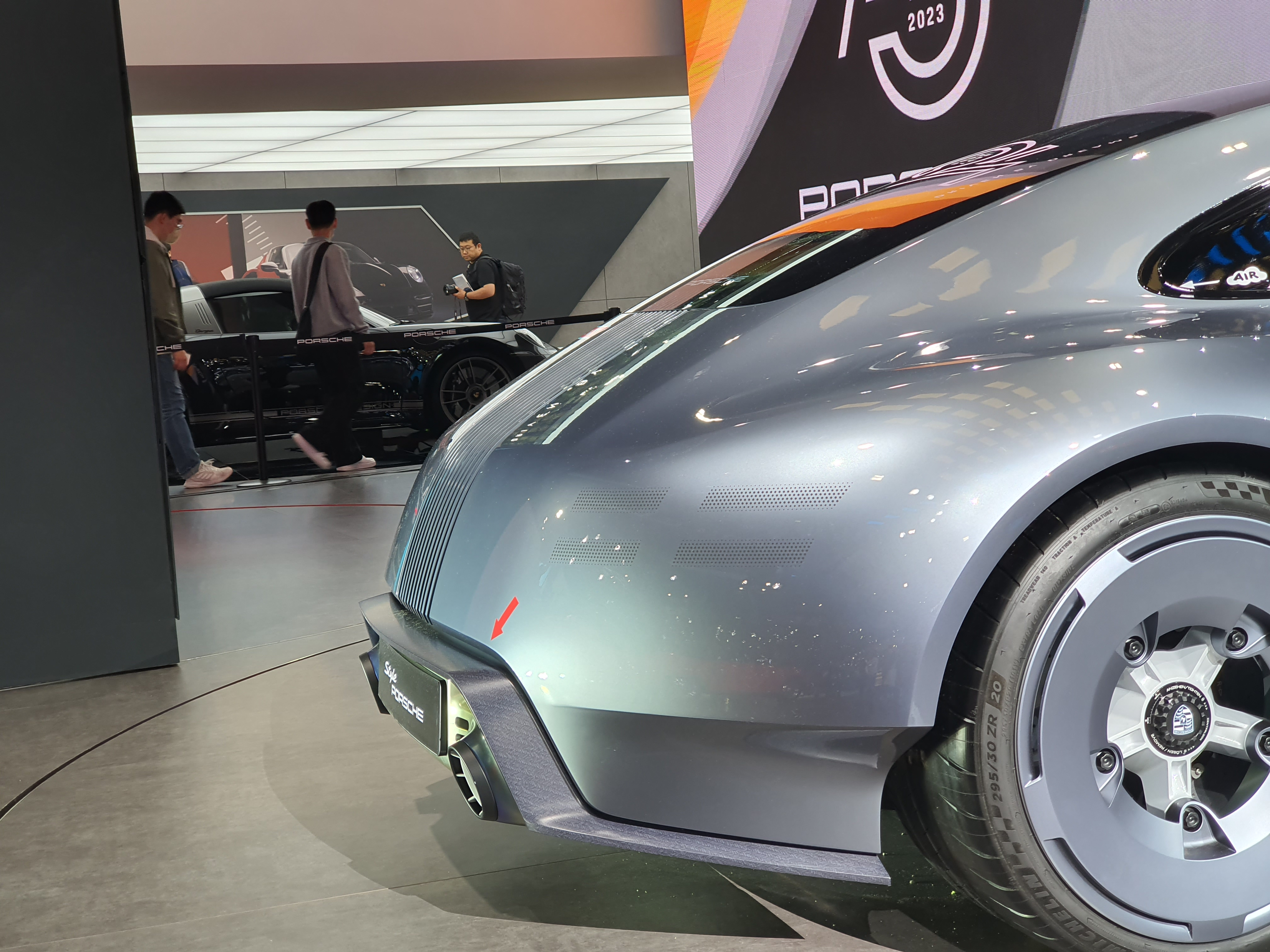

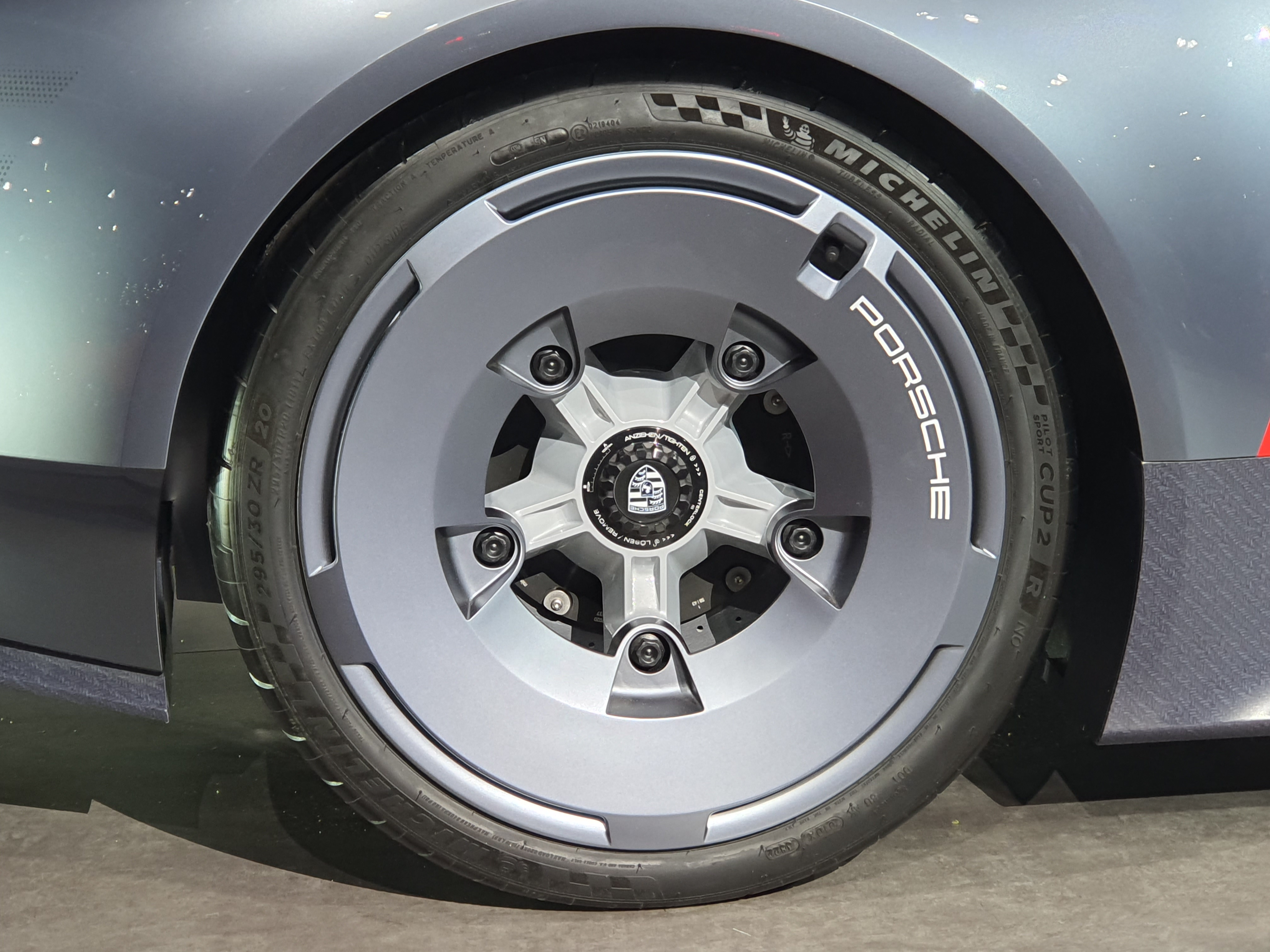

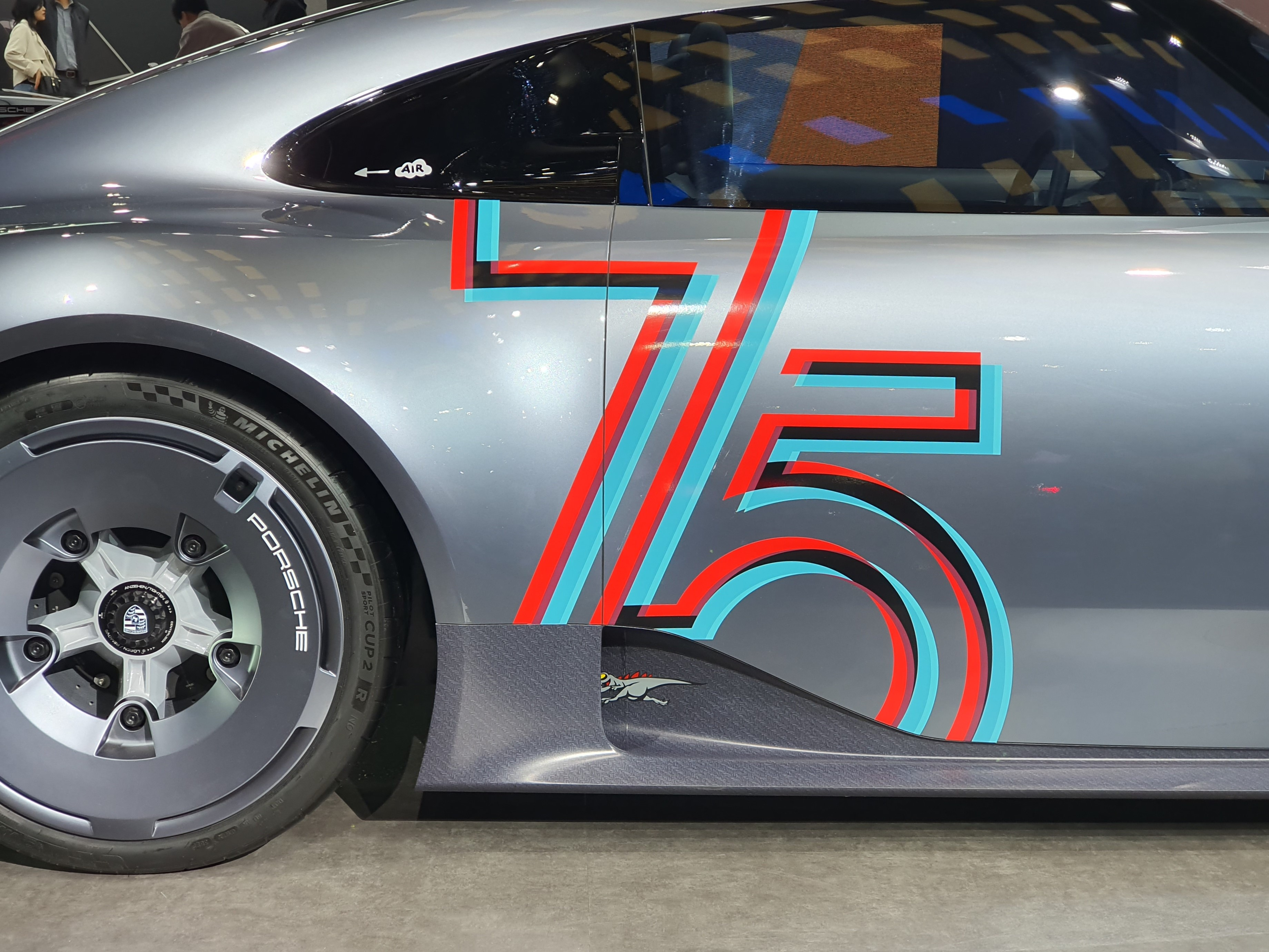
